= British Independent Film Award for Best Debut Screenwriter =

Film award

- Awarded for: Best Debut Screenwriter
- Country: United Kingdom
- Presented by: BIFA
- First award: 2016
- Currently held by: Rich Peppiatt for Kneecap (2024)
- Website: www.bifa.org.uk

The British Independent Film Award for Best Debut Screenwriter is an annual award given by the British Independent Film Awards (BIFA) to recognize the best British debut screenwriter. The award was first presented in the 2016 ceremony.

According to BIFA, the award is for a "British screenwriter for their debut fiction feature film". The award usually goes to one screenwriter with co-writers being eligible when there is no lead screenwriter credited for the film.

== Winners and nominees ==
=== 2010s ===
Year	Recipient(s)	Film
2016 (19th)	Rachel Tunnard	Adult Life Skills
2016 (19th)	Julian Barratt and Simon Farnaby	Mindhorn
2016 (19th)	John Cairns and Michael McCartney	A Patch of Fog
2016 (19th)	Hope Dickson Leach	The Levelling
2016 (19th)	Ed Talfan	The Passing (Yr Ymadawiad)
2017 (20th)	Francis Lee	God's Own Country
2017 (20th)	Alice Birch	Lady Macbeth
2017 (20th)	Gaby Chiappe	Their Finest
2017 (20th)	Johnny Harris	Jawbone
2017 (20th)	Rungano Nyoni	I Am Not a Witch
2018 (21st)	Bart Layton	American Animals
2018 (21st)	Karen Gillan	The Party's Just Beginning
2018 (21st)	Daniel Kokotajlo (director)	Apostasy
2018 (21st)	Matt Palmer	Calibre
2018 (21st)	Michael Pearce	Beast
2019 (22nd)	Emma Jane Unsworth	Animals
2019 (22nd)	Kieran Hurley	Beats
2019 (22nd)	Lisa Owens	Days of the Bagnold Summer
2019 (22nd)	Nicole Taylor	Wild Rose
2019 (22nd)	Harry Wootliff	Only You

=== 2020s ===
Year	Recipient(s)	Film
2020 (23rd)	Riz Ahmed	Mogul Mowgli
2020 (23rd)	Rose Glass	Saint Maud
2020 (23rd)	Theresa Ikoko and Claire Wilson	Rocks
2020 (23rd)	Joe Murtagh	Calm with Horses
2020 (23rd)	Remi Weekes and Bassam Tariq	His House
2021 (24th)	Cathy Brady	Wildfire
2021 (24th)	Prano Bailey-Bond	Censor
2021 (24th)	Aleem Khan	After Love
2021 (24th)	Marley Morrison	Sweetheart
2021 (24th)	Reggie Yates	Pirates
2022 (25th)	Georgia Oakley	Blue Jean
2022 (25th)	Shane Crowley	God's Creatures
2022 (25th)	Davi Earl and Chris Hayward	Brian and Charles
2022 (25th)	Ruth Greenberg	The Origin
2022 (25th)	Charlotte Wells	Aftersun
2023 (26th)	Nida Manzoor	Polite Society
2023 (26th)	Nathan Bryon and Tom Melia	Rye Lane
2023 (26th)	Sam H. Freeman and Ng Choon Ping	Femme
2023 (26th)	Molly Manning Walker	How to Have Sex
2023 (26th)	Charlotte Regan	Scrapper
2024 (27th)	Rich Peppiatt	Kneecap
2024 (27th)	James Krishna Floyd	Unicorns
2024 (27th)	Karan Kandhari	Sister Midnight
2024 (27th)	Sandhya Suri	Santosh
2024 (27th)	Mrs & Mr Dave Thomas	The Assessment (Note: Also written by John Donnelly.)

== See also ==
- BAFTA Award for Outstanding Debut by a British Writer, Director or Producer
