= National Board of Review: Top Ten Independent Films =

National Board of Review's Top 10 Independent Films (since 2006)

The following is a list of the Top 10 Independent Films chosen annually by the National Board of Review of Motion Pictures, beginning in 2006.

== Lists ==
=== 2000s ===
- 2006:
  - 10 Items or Less
  - Akeelah and the Bee
  - Bobby
  - Catch a Fire
  - Copying Beethoven
  - A Guide to Recognizing Your Saints
  - Half Nelson
  - The Illusionist
  - Lonesome Jim
  - Sherrybaby
  - Thank You for Smoking
- 2007:
  - Away from Her
  - Great World of Sound
  - Honeydripper
  - In the Valley of Elah
  - A Mighty Heart
  - The Namesake
  - Once
  - The Savages
  - Starting Out in the Evening
  - Waitress

- 2008:
  - Frozen River
  - In Bruges
  - In Search of a Midnight Kiss
  - Mister Foe
  - Rachel Getting Married
  - Snow Angels
  - Son of Rambow
  - Wendy and Lucy
  - Vicky Cristina Barcelona
  - The Visitor
- 2009:
  - Amreeka
  - District 9
  - Goodbye Solo
  - Humpday
  - In the Loop
  - Julia
  - Me and Orson Welles
  - Moon
  - Sugar
  - Two Lovers

=== 2010s ===
- 2010:
  - Animal Kingdom
  - Buried
  - Fish Tank
  - The Ghost Writer
  - Greenberg
  - Let Me In
  - Monsters
  - Please Give
  - Somewhere
  - Youth in Revolt
- 2011:
  - 50/50
  - Another Earth
  - Beginners
  - A Better Life
  - Cedar Rapids
  - Margin Call
  - Shame
  - Take Shelter
  - We Need To Talk About Kevin
  - Win Win

- 2012:
  - Arbitrage
  - Bernie
  - Compliance
  - End of Watch
  - Hello I Must Be Going
  - Little Birds
  - Moonrise Kingdom
  - On the Road
  - Quartet
  - Sleepwalk with Me
- 2013:
  - Ain't Them Bodies Saints
  - Dallas Buyers Club
  - In a World...
  - Mother of George
  - Much Ado About Nothing
  - Mud
  - The Place Beyond the Pines
  - Short Term 12
  - Sightseers
  - The Spectacular Now

- 2014:
  - Blue Ruin
  - Locke
  - A Most Wanted Man
  - Mr. Turner
  - Obvious Child
  - The Skeleton Twins
  - Snowpiercer
  - Stand Clear of the Closing Doors
  - Starred Up
  - Still Alice
- 2015:
  - '71
  - 45 Years
  - Cop Car
  - Ex Machina
  - Grandma
  - It Follows
  - James White
  - Mississippi Grind
  - Welcome to Me
  - While We’re Young

- 2016:
  - 20th Century Women
  - Captain Fantastic
  - Creative Control
  - Eye in the Sky
  - The Fits
  - Green Room
  - Hello, My Name Is Doris
  - Krisha
  - Morris from America
  - Sing Street
- 2017:
  - Beatriz at Dinner
  - Brigsby Bear
  - A Ghost Story
  - Lady Macbeth
  - Logan Lucky
  - Loving Vincent
  - Menashe
  - Norman
  - Patti Cake$
  - Wind River

- 2018:
  - The Death of Stalin
  - Lean on Pete
  - Leave No Trace
  - Mid90s
  - The Old Man & the Gun
  - The Rider
  - Searching
  - Sorry to Bother You
  - We the Animals
  - You Were Never Really Here
- 2019:
  - The Farewell
  - Give Me Liberty
  - A Hidden Life
  - Judy
  - The Last Black Man in San Francisco
  - Midsommar
  - The Nightingale
  - The Peanut Butter Falcon
  - The Souvenir
  - Wild Rose

=== 2020s ===
- 2020:
  - The Climb
  - Driveways
  - Farewell Amor
  - Miss Juneteenth
  - The Nest
  - Never Rarely Sometimes Always
  - The Outpost
  - Relic
  - Saint Frances
  - Wolfwalkers
- 2021:
  - The Card Counter
  - C'mon C'mon
  - CODA
  - The Green Knight
  - Holler
  - Jockey
  - Old Henry
  - Pig
  - Shiva Baby
  - The Souvenir Part II

- 2022:
  - Armageddon Time
  - Emily the Criminal
  - The Eternal Daughter
  - Funny Pages
  - The Inspection
  - Living
  - A Love Song
  - Nanny
  - To Leslie
  - The Wonder
- 2023:
  - All Dirt Roads Taste of Salt
  - All of Us Strangers
  - BlackBerry
  - Earth Mama
  - Flora and Son
  - The Persian Version
  - Scrapper
  - Showing Up
  - Theater Camp
  - A Thousand and One

- 2024:
  - Bird
  - A Different Man
  - Dìdi
  - Ghostlight
  - Good One
  - Hard Truths
  - His Three Daughters
  - Love Lies Bleeding
  - My Old Ass
  - Thelma
- 2025:
  - The Baltimorons
  - Bring Her Back
  - Father Mother Sister Brother
  - Friendship
  - Good Boy
  - If I Had Legs I’d Kick You
  - The Mastermind
  - Rebuilding
  - Sorry, Baby
  - Urchin
