= British Independent Film Awards 2023 =

Awards ceremony

26th British Independent Film Awards
- Awarded for: Best in British independent film
- Date: 3 December 2023
- Site: Old Billingsgate, London
- Hosted by: Lolly Adefope; Kiell Smith-Bynoe
- Official website: www.bifa.film

Highlights
- Best Film: All of Us Strangers
- Most awards: All of Us Strangers (7)
- Most nominations: Rye Lane (16)

The British Independent Film Awards 2023 were held on 3 December 2023 to recognise the best in British independent cinema and filmmaking talent from United Kingdom. The ceremony took place at Old Billingsgate in London, and was hosted by English comedian Lolly Adefope and British actor Kiell Smith-Bynoe.

The nominations were announced on 2 November 2023 by actors Susan Wokoma and Morfydd Clark at the One Hundred Shoreditch, London. Romantic comedy film Rye Lane led the nominations with sixteen, followed by Scrapper and All of Us Strangers with fourteen each.

The longlists for the Douglas Hickox Award (Best Debut Director), Best Debut Screenwriter, Best Debut Director – Feature Documentary, and Breakthrough Producer were announced on 18 October 2023. Meanwhile, the longlists for Best Documentary and Best International Independent Film were announced the day after. The Best British Short Film longlist was announced on 23 October 2023 and Breakthrough Performance longlist on 24 October 2023.

All of Us Strangers received the most awards with seven wins overall, including Best British Independent Film and Best Director. English actor Stephen Graham was honored with the Richard Harris Award.

== Winners and nominees ==
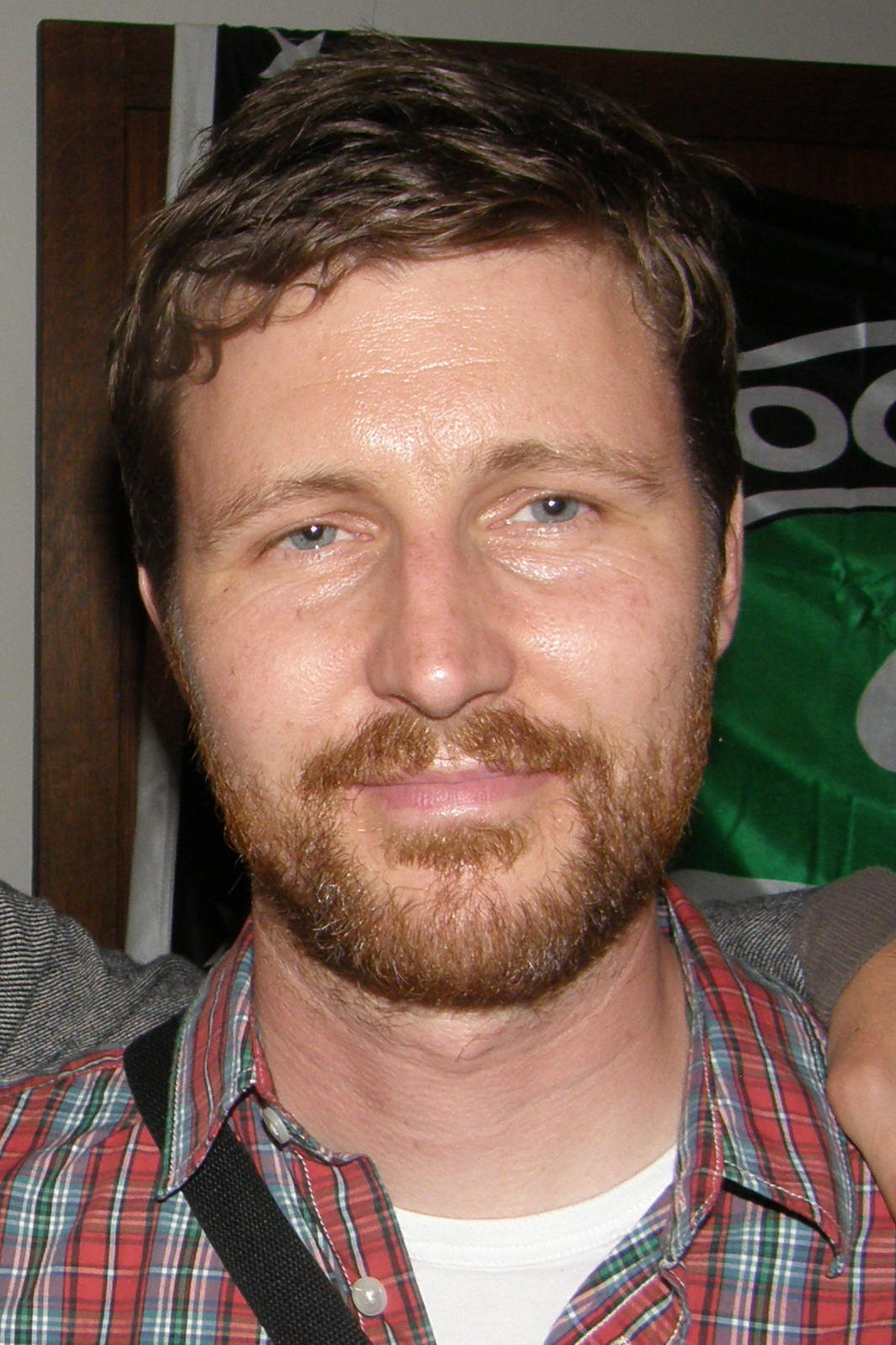
Andrew Haigh, Best Director winner

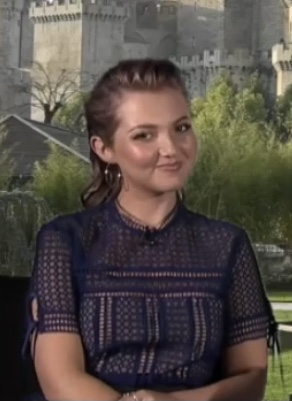
Mia McKenna-Bruce, Best Lead Performance winner

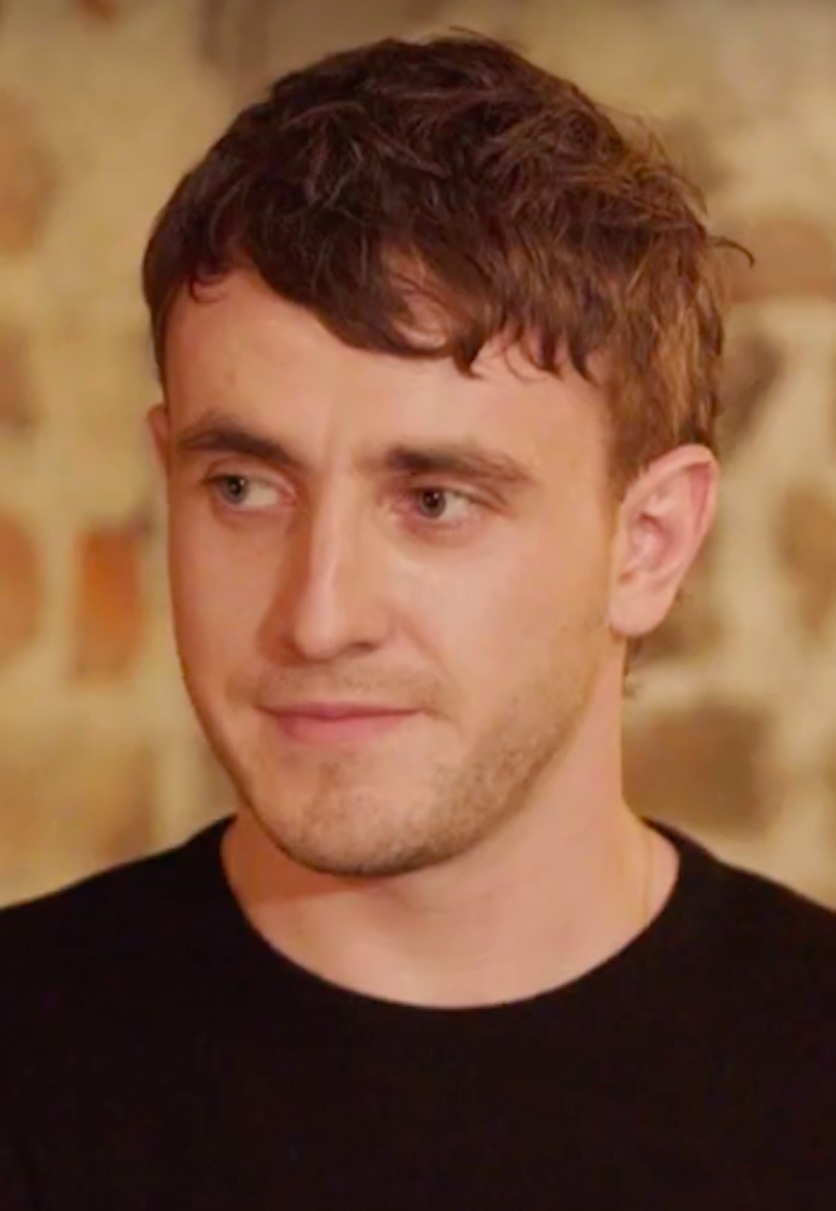
Paul Mescal, Best Supporting Performance co-winner

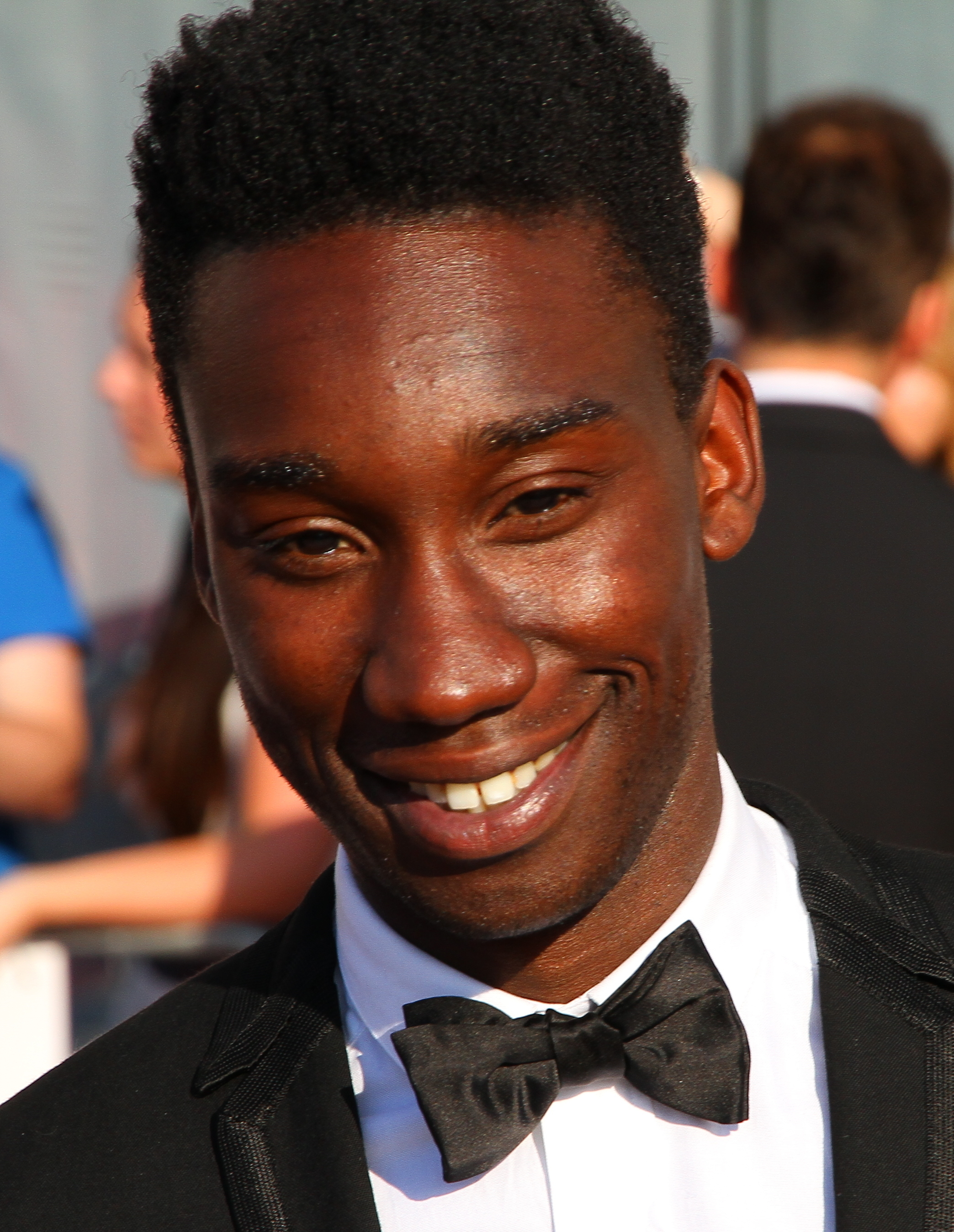
Nathan Stewart-Jarrett, Best Joint Lead Performance co-winner

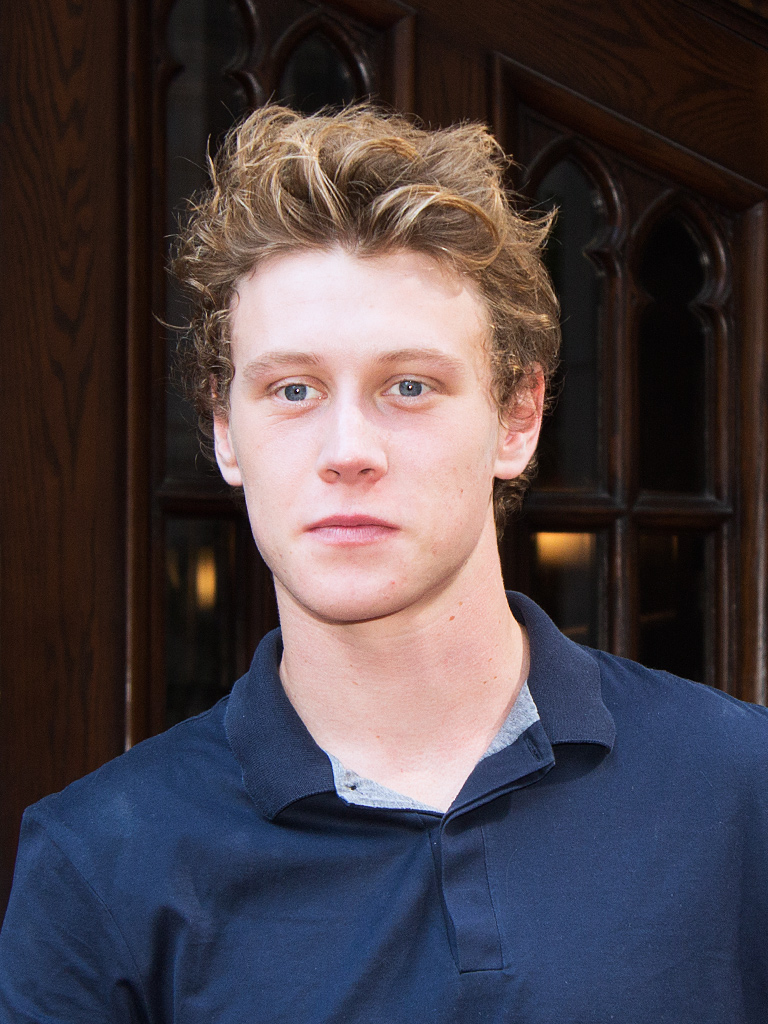
George MacKay, Best Joint Lead Performance co-winner

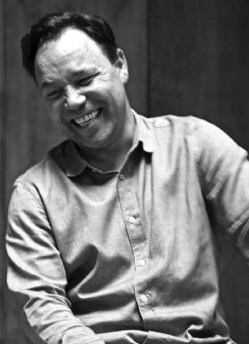
Stephen Graham, Richard Harris Award recipient

The winner of craft categories were announced on 20 November 2023. The winners for the remaining categories were announced on 3 December 2023.

Best British Independent Film	Best Director
All of Us Strangers – Andrew Haigh, Graham Broadbent, Peter Czernin, and Sarah Harvey; Femme – Sam H. Freeman, Ng Choon Ping, Myles Payne, and Sam Ritzenberg; How to Have Sex – Molly Manning Walker, Ivana MacKinnon, Emily Leo, and Konstantinos Kontovrakis; Rye Lane – Raine Allen-Miller, Nathan Bryon, Tom Melia, Yvonne Isimeme Ibazebo, and Damian Jones; Scrapper – Charlotte Regan and Theo Barrowclough	Andrew Haigh – All of Us Strangers; Raine Allen-Miller – Rye Lane; Sam H. Freeman and Ng Choon Ping – Femme; Charlotte Regan – Scrapper; Molly Manning Walker – How to Have Sex
Best Lead Performance	Best Supporting Performance
Mia McKenna-Bruce – How to Have Sex as Tara; Jodie Comer – The End We Start From as Mother; Tia Nomore – Earth Mama as Gia; Nabhaan Rizwan – In Camera as Aden; Andrew Scott – All of Us Strangers as Adam; Tilda Swinton – The Eternal Daughter as Julie and Rosalind Hart	Paul Mescal – All of Us Strangers as Harry; Shaun Thomas – How to Have Sex as Badger; Ritu Arya – Polite Society as Lena Khan; Jamie Bell – All of Us Strangers as Adam's father; Samuel Bottomley – How to Have Sex as Paddy; Alexandra Burke – Pretty Red Dress as Candice; Amir El-Masry – In Camera as Conrad; Claire Foy – All of Us Strangers as Adam's mother; Alia Shawkat – Drift as Callie; Katherine Waterston – The End We Start From as O
Best Joint Lead Performance	Breakthrough Performance
Nathan Stewart-Jarrett and George MacKay – Femme as Jules and Preston; Lola Campbell and Harris Dickinson – Scrapper as Georgie and Jason; David Jonsson and Vivian Oparah – Rye Lane as Dom and Yas	Vivian Oparah – Rye Lane as Yas; Le'Shantey Bonsu – Girl as Ama; Lola Campbell – Scrapper as Georgie; Priya Kansara – Polite Society as Ria Khan; Mia McKenna-Bruce – How to Have Sex as Tara
Best Screenplay	Best Documentary
All of Us Strangers – Andrew Haigh; Femme – Sam H. Freeman and Ng Choon Ping; How to Have Sex – Molly Manning Walker; Rye Lane – Nathan Bryon and Tom Melia; Scrapper – Charlotte Regan	If the Streets Were on Fire – Alice Russell and Gannesh Rajah; Another Body – Sophie Compton, Reubyn Hamlyn, Isabel Freeman, and Elizabeth Woodward; Bobi Wine: The People's President – Christopher Sharp, Moses Bwayo, and John Battsek; Lyra – Alison Millar and Jackie Doyle; Occupied City – Steve McQueen, Bianca Stigter, Anna Smith-Tenser, and Floor Onrust
Best International Independent Film	Best Short Film
Anatomy of a Fall – Justine Triet, Arthur Harari, Marie-Ange Luciani, and David Thion; Fallen Leaves – Aki Kaurismäki, Misha Jaari, Mark Lwoff, and Reinhard Brundig; Fremont – Babak Jalali, Carolina Cavalli, Marjaneh Moghimi, Sudnya Shroff, and Rachael Fung; Monster – Hirokazu Kore-eda, Yuji Sakamoto, Genki Kawamura, Kenji Yamada, Megumi Banse, Taichi Ito, and Hijiri Taguchi; Past Lives – Celine Song, David Hinojosa, Christine Vachon, and Pamela Koffler	Festival of Slaps – Abdou Cissé, Cheri Darbon, and George Telfer; Christopher at Sea – Tom CJ Brown, Amanda Miller, Hanna Stolarski, Emily-Jane Brown, Nick Read, Pierre Boivin, Constance Le Scouarnec, and Laure Desmazières; Lions – Beru Tessema and Ama Ampadu; Muna – Warda Mohamed, Angela Moneke, and Simon Hatton; The Talent – Thomas May Bailey, Emma D'Arcy, and Ellen Spence
Best Casting	Best Cinematography
How to Have Sex – Isabella Odoffin; All of Us Strangers – Kahleen Crawford; Earth Mama – Salome Oggenfuss, Geraldine Barón, and Abby Harri; Rye Lane – Kharmel Cochrane; Scrapper – Shaheen Baig	All of Us Strangers – Jamie D. Ramsay; The End We Start From – Suzie Lavelle; Femme – James Rhodes; Rye Lane – Olan Collardy; Scrapper – Molly Manning Walker
Best Costume Design	Best Editing
Femme – Buki Ebiesuwa; The End We Start From – PC Williams; How to Have Sex – George Buxton; Rye Lane – Cynthia Lawrence-John; Scrapper – Oliver Cronk	All of Us Strangers – Jonathan Alberts; Bobi Wine: The People's President – Paul Carlin; The End We Start From – Arttu Salmi; High & Low – John Galliamo – Avdhesh Mohla; Rye Lane – Victoria Boydell
Best Effects	Best Make-Up & Hair Design
The Kitchen – Jonathan Gales and Richard Baker; The End We Start From – Theodor Flo-Groeneboom; Polite Society – Paddy Eason	Femme – Marie Deehan; All of Us Strangers – Zoe Clare Brown; How to Have Sex – Natasha Lawes; Polite Society – Claire Carter; Rye Lane – Bianca Simone Scott
Best Original Music	Best Music Supervision
Rye Lane – Kwes; The End We Start From – Anna Meredith; Femme – Adam Janota Bzowski; Girl – Ré Olunuga; Scrapper – Patrick Jonsson	All of Us Strangers – Connie Farr; Femme – Ciara Elwis; Rye Lane – David Fish
Best Production Design	Best Sound
The Kitchen – Nathan Parker; All of Us Strangers – Sarah Finlay; The End We Start From – Laura Ellis Cricks; Rye Lane – Anna Rhodes; Scrapper – Elena Muntoni	Enys Men – Mark Jenkin; All of Us Strangers – Joakim Sundström, Per Bostrom, and Stevie Haywood; The End We Start From – Jens Rosenlund-Petersen, Amy Felton, Joe Jackson, Tim Cavagin, and Lori Dovi; How to Have Sex – Steve Fanagan; Scrapper – Ben Baird, Jack Wensley, Adam Fletcher, and Alexej Mungersdorff
Douglas Hickox Award (Best Debut Director)	Best Debut Screenwriter
Savanah Leaf – Earth Mama; Raine Allen-Miller – Rye Lane; Sam H. Freeman and Ng Choon Ping – Femme; Charlotte Regan – Scrapper; Molly Manning Walker – How to Have Sex	Nida Manzoor – Polite Society; Nathan Bryon and Tom Melia – Rye Lane; Sam H. Freeman and Ng Choon Ping – Femme; Charlotte Regan – Scrapper; Molly Manning Walker – How to Have Sex
Breakthrough Producer	The Raindance Maverick Award
Theo Barrowclough – Scrapper; Georgia Goggin – Pretty Red Dress; Yvonne Isimeme Ibazebo – Rye Lane; Gannesh Rajah – If the Streets Were on Fire; Chi Thai – Raging Grace	If the Streets Were on Fire – Alice Russell and Gannesh Rajah; Is There Anybody Out There? – Ella Glendining and Janine Marmot; Name Me Lawand – Edward Lovelace; Raging Grace – Paris Zarcilla and Chi Thai; Red Herring – Kit Vincent and Ed Owles
Best Debut Director – Feature Documentary
Chloe Abrahams – The Taste of Mango; Sophie Compton and Reuben Hamlyn – Another Body; Ella Glendining – Is There Anybody Out There?; Alice Russell – If the Streets Were on Fire; Christopher Sharp – Bobi Wine: The People's President
Richard Harris Award
Stephen Graham

=== Films with multiple nominations and awards ===
Films that received multiple nominations
Nominations	Film
16	Rye Lane
14	All of Us Strangers
14	Scrapper
13	How to Have Sex
11	Femme
9	The End We Start From
5	Polite Society
4	If the Streets Were on Fire
3	Bobi Wine: The People's President
3	Earth Mama
2	Another Body
2	Girl
2	In Camera
2	The Kitchen
2	Pretty Red Dress
2	Raging Grace

Films that received multiple awards
Awards	Film
7	All Of Us Strangers
3	Femme
2	How to Have Sex
2	If The Streets Were On Fire
2	The Kitchen
2	Rye Lane
