= British Independent Film Award for Best Costume Design =

British film award

- Awarded for: Best Costume Design
- Country: United Kingdom
- Presented by: BIFA
- First award: 2017
- Currently held by: Firebrand – Michael O'Connor (2024)
- Website: www.bifa.org.uk

The British Independent Film Award for Best Costume Design is an annual award given by the British Independent Film Awards (BIFA) to recognize the best costume design in a British independent film. The award was first presented in the 2017 ceremony.

Prior to 2017, costume design was included in the category Best Technical Achievement alongside different areas of crafts in film, this category was presented from 2001 to 2016.

== Winners and nominees ==
=== 2010s ===
Year	Film	Recipient(s)
2017 (20th)	Lady Macbeth	Holly Waddington
2017 (20th)	The Death of Stalin	Suzie Harman
2017 (20th)	How to Talk to Girls at Parties	Sandy Powell
2017 (20th)	I Am Not a Witch	Holly Rebecca
2017 (20th)	My Cousin Rachel	Dinah Collin
2018 (21st)	The Favourite	Sandy Powell
2018 (21st)	Colette	Andrea Flesch
2018 (21st)	An Evening with Beverly Luff Linn	Alyssa Tull
2018 (21st)	Peterloo	Jacqueline Durran
2018 (21st)	Stan & Ollie	Guy Sperenza
2019 (22nd)	The Personal History of David Copperfield	Suzie Harman and Robert Worley
2019 (22nd)	In Fabric	Jo Thompson
2019 (22nd)	Judy	Jany Temime
2019 (22nd)	The Souvenir	Grace Snell
2019 (22nd)	Wild Rose	Anna Robbins

=== 2020s ===
Year	Film	Recipient(s)
2020 (23rd)	Misbehaviour	Charlotte Walter
2020 (23rd)	Ammonite	Michael O'Connor
2020 (23rd)	Rocks	Ruka Johnson
2020 (23rd)	Saint Maud	Tina Kalivas
2020 (23rd)	The Secret Garden	Michele Clapton
2021 (24th)	The Souvenir Part II	Grace Snell
2021 (24th)	Benediction	Annie Symons
2021 (24th)	Belfast	Charlotte Walter
2021 (24th)	The Electrical Life of Louis Wain	Michael O'Connor
2021 (24th)	Everybody's Talking About Jamie	Guy Speranza
2022 (25th)	Mrs. Harris Goes to Paris	Jenny Beavan
2022 (25th)	Aftersun	Frank Gallacher
2022 (25th)	Flux Gourmet	Saffron Cullane
2022 (25th)	Living	Sandy Powell
2022 (25th)	The Wonder	Odile Dicks-Mireaux
2023 (26th)	Femme	Buki Ebiesuwa
2023 (26th)	The End We Start From	PC Williams
2023 (26th)	How to Have Sex	George Buxton
2023 (26th)	Rye Lane	Cynthia Lawrence-John
2023 (26th)	Scrapper	Oliver Cronk
2024 (27th)	Firebrand	Michael O'Connor
2024 (27th)	Civil War	Meghan Kasperlik
2024 (27th)	Kneecap	Zjena Glamocanin
2024 (27th)	Love Lies Bleeding	Olga Mill
2024 (27th)	Unicorns	Nirage Mirage
2025 (28th)	Pillion	Grace Snell
2025 (28th)	100 Nights of Hero	Susie Coulthard
2025 (28th)	My Father's Shadow	PC Williams
2025 (28th)	A Pale View of Hills	Sayaka Takahashi and Matthew Price
2025 (28th)	Tornado	Kirsty Halliday
