= British Independent Film Award for Best Sound =

- Awarded for: Best Sound
- Country: United Kingdom
- Presented by: BIFA
- First award: 2017
- Currently held by: Civil War – Glen Freemantle (2024)
- Website: www.bifa.org.uk

The British Independent Film Award for Best Sound is an annual award given by the British Independent Film Awards (BIFA) to recognize the best sound in a British independent film. The award was first presented in the 2017 ceremony.

Prior to 2017, sound was included in the category Best Technical Achievement alongside different areas of crafts in film, this category was presented from 2001 to 2016.

== Winners and nominees ==
=== 2010s ===
Year	Film	Recipient(s)
2017 (20th)	God's Own Country	Anna Bertmark
2017 (20th)	Breathe	Becki Ponting and Ian Wilson
2017 (20th)	I Am Not a Witch	Maiken Hansen
2017 (20th)	Jawbone	Andy Shelley and Steve Griffiths
2017 (20th)	Three Billboards Outside Ebbing, Missouri	Joakim Sundström
2018 (21st)	You Were Never Really Here	Paul Davies
2018 (21st)	American Animals	Andrew Stirk
2018 (21st)	The Favourite	Johnnie Burn
2018 (21st)	A Prayer Before Dawn	Séverin Favriau
2018 (21st)	Time Trial	CJ Mirra
2019 (22nd)	Beats	David Bowtle-McMillan, Joakim Sundström and Robert Farr
2019 (22nd)	Diego Maradona	Stephen Griffiths, Tim Cavagin, Max Walsh and Andy Shelley
2019 (22nd)	Gwen	Anna My Bertmark, Jonathan Seale and Jules Woods
2019 (22nd)	In Fabric	Martin Pavey and Rob Entwistle
2019 (22nd)	Wild Rose	Colin Nicolson, Lee Walpole and Stuart Hilliker

=== 2020s ===
Year	Film	Recipient(s)
2020 (23rd)	The Reason I Jump	Nick Ryan, Ben Baird and Sara de Oliveira Lima
2020 (23rd)	His House	Adrian Bell, Glenn Freemantle, Frank Kruse, Brendan Nicholson and Richard Pryke
2020 (23rd)	Host	Calum Sample
2020 (23rd)	Mogul Mowgli	Paul Davies, Robert Farr, Nigel Albermaniche and Ian Morgan
2020 (23rd)	Saint Maud	Paul Davies, Simon Farmer and Andrew Stirk
2021 (24th)	Boiling Point	James Drake, Rob Entwistle and Kiff McManus
2021 (24th)	Censor	Tim Harrison, Jamie Roden and Adele Fletcher
2021 (24th)	Cow	Nicolas Becker, Cyril Holtz and Linda Forsen
2021 (24th)	Encounter	Andrew Stirk, Paul Davies, Morgan Muse, Bernard O'Reilley and Julian Howarth
2021 (24th)	IN THE EⱯRTH	Martin Pavey
2022 (25th)	Flux Gourmet	Tim Harrison, Raoul Brand and Cassandra Rutledge
2022 (25th)	Aftersun	Jovan Adjer
2022 (25th)	The Feast	Dom Corbisiero and Dai Shell
2022 (25th)	Men	Glenn Freemantle, Ben Barker, Gillian Dodders, Howard Bargoff and Mitch Low
2022 (25th)	The Wonder	Hugh Fox and Ben Baird
2023 (26th)	Enys Men	Mark Jenkin
2023 (26th)	All of Us Strangers	Joakim Sundström, Per Bostrom and Stevie Haywood
2023 (26th)	The End We Start From	Jens Rosenlund-Petersen, Amy Felton, Joe Jackson, Tim Cavagin and Lori Dovi
2023 (26th)	How to Have Sex	Steve Fanagan
2023 (26th)	Scrapper	Ben Baird, Jack Wensley, Adam Fletcher and Alexej Mungersdorff
2024 (27th)	Civil War	Glenn Freemantle
2024 (27th)	Kneecap	Louise Burton, Brendan Rehill, Aza Hand and Simon Kerr
2024 (27th)	Lee	Mike Prestwood Smith, Csaba Major and Jimmy Boyle
2024 (27th)	Love Lies Bleeding	Paul Davies, Andrew Stirk, Linda Forsén, Rose Bladh and Tim Burns
2024 (27th)	The Outrun	Dominik Leube, Oscar Stiebitz, Jonathan Schorr and Gregor Bonse
