= British Independent Film Award for Best Cinematography =

British award

- Awarded for: Best Cinematography
- Country: United Kingdom
- Presented by: BIFA
- Currently held by: Love Lies Bleeding – Ben Fordesman (2024)
- Website: www.bifa.org.uk

The British Independent Film Award for Best Cinematography is an annual award given to the cinematographer's work that has been deemed "best" in a particular year for their work in independent British cinema. The award was introduced in 2017. Before its inception, cinematography was included in the category named Best Technical Achievement.

== Winners and nominees ==
=== 2010s ===
Year	Film	Recipient(s)
2017 (20th)	Lady Macbeth	Ari Wegner
2017 (20th)	I Am Not a Witch	David Gallego
2017 (20th)	Jawbone	Tat Radcliffe
2017 (20th)	Leaning Into the Wind	Thomas Riedelsheimer
2017 (20th)	Three Billboards Outside Ebbing, Missouri	Ben Davis
2018 (21st)	The Favourite	Robbie Ryan
2018 (21st)	American Animals	Ole Bratt Birkeland
2018 (21st)	Lean on Pete	Magnus Joenck
2018 (21st)	A Prayer Before Dawn	David Ungaro
2018 (21st)	You Were Never Really Here	Thomas Townend
2019 (22nd)	Beats	Benjamin Kračun
2019 (22nd)	In Fabric	Ari Wegner
2019 (22nd)	Judy	Ole Bratt Birkeland
2019 (22nd)	Moffie	Jamie D. Ramsay
2019 (22nd)	The Personal History of David Copperfield	Zac Nicholson

=== 2020s ===
Year	Film	Recipient(s)
2020 (23rd)	Saint Maud	Ben Fordesman
2020 (23rd)	His House	Jo Willems
2020 (23rd)	Limbo	Nick Cooke
2020 (23rd)	Mogul Mowgli	Anika Summerson
2020 (23rd)	Rocks	Hélène Louvart
2021 (24th)	Boiling Point	Matthew Lewis
2021 (24th)	Belfast	Haris Zambarloukos
2021 (24th)	Censor	Annika Summerson
2021 (24th)	Cow	Magda Kowalczyk
2021 (24th)	The Nest	Mátyás Erdély
2022 (25th)	Aftersun	Gregory Oke
2022 (25th)	Kanaval	Joel Honeywell
2022 (25th)	Men	Rob Hardy
2022 (25th)	Nascondino	Alfredo de Juan
2022 (25th)	The Wonder	Ari Wegner
2023 (26th)	All of Us Strangers	Jamie D. Ramsay
2023 (26th)	The End We Start From	Suzie Lavelle
2023 (26th)	Femme	James Rhodes
2023 (26th)	Rye Lane	Olan Collardy
2023 (26th)	Scrapper	Molly Manning Walker
2024 (27th)	Love Lies Bleeding	Ben Fordesman
2024 (27th)	Civil War	Rob Hardy
2024 (27th)	Kneecap	Ryan Kernaghan
2024 (27th)	Lee	Pawel Edelman
2024 (27th)	The Outrun	Yunus Roy Imer
