= British Independent Film Award for Best Music =

- Awarded for: Best Music
- Country: United Kingdom
- Presented by: BIFA
- First award: 2001
- Currently held by: Kneecap – Michael "Mikey J" Asante (2024)
- Website: www.bifa.org.uk

The British Independent Film Award for Best Music is an annual award given by the British Independent Film Awards (BIFA) to recognize the best music in a British independent film. The award was first presented in the 2001 ceremony though it did not become a regular category until 2017.

Prior to 2017, music was awarded as a stand-alone category in 2001 but it was included in the category Best Technical Achievement the next year alongside different areas of crafts in film, This category was presented from 2001 to 2016.

In July 2022, it was announced that the music category would be split into two categories depending on the percentage of original music in the film, Best Original Music for "films in which original score makes up at least 40% of the film’s music soundtrack" and Best Music Supervision for those "in which sourced music makes up at least 40% of the film’s music soundtrack".

== Winners and nominees ==
=== 2000s ===
Best Music

Year	Film	Recipient(s)
2001 (4th)	South West 9	Dave Pearce
2001 (4th)	Christie Malry's Own Double-Entry	Luke Haines
2001 (4th)	Jump Tomorrow	John Kimbrough
2001 (4th)	The Warrior	Dario Marianelli

=== 2010s ===
Year	Film	Recipient(s)
2017 (20th)	Three Billboards Outside Ebbing, Missouri	Carter Burwell
2017 (20th)	The Death of Stalin	Christopher Willis
2017 (20th)	I Am Not a Witch	Matthew James Kelly
2017 (20th)	Jawbone	Paul Weller
2017 (20th)	Leaning Into the Wind	Fred Frith
2018 (21st)	You Were Never Really Here	Jonny Greenwood
2018 (21st)	American Animals	Anne Nikitin
2018 (21st)	Beast	Jim Williams
2018 (21st)	Funny Cow	Richard Hawley
2018 (21st)	Island of the Hungry Ghosts	Aaron Cupples
2019 (22nd)	Wild Rose	Jack Arnold
2019 (22nd)	Beats	JD Twitch, Penelope Trappes and Stephen Hindman
2019 (22nd)	Diego Maradona	Antônio Pinto
2019 (22nd)	For Sama	Nainita Desai
2019 (22nd)	In Fabric	Cavern of Anti-Matter

=== 2020s ===
Year	Film	Recipient(s)
2020 (23rd)	Mogul Mowgli	Paul Corley
2020 (23rd)	His House	Roque Baños
2020 (23rd)	The Reason I Jump	Nainita Desai
2020 (23rd)	Rocks	Connie Farr and Emilie Levienaise-Farrouch
2020 (23rd)	Saint Maud	Adam Janota Bzowski
2021 (24th)	Ali & Ava	Connie Farr and Harry Escott
2021 (24th)	Belfast	Van Morrison
2021 (24th)	Encounter	Jed Kurzel
2021 (24th)	IN THE EⱯRTH	Clint Mansell
2021 (24th)	Pirates	Iain Cooke

Best Original Music

Year	Film	Recipient(s)
2022 (25th)	The Wonder	Matthew Herbert
2022 (25th)	Aftersun	Oliver Coates
2022 (25th)	God's Creatures	Danny Bensi and Saunder Jurriaans
2022 (25th)	Men	Ben Salisbury and Geoff Barrow
2022 (25th)	The Origin	Adam Janota Bzowski
2023 (26th)	Rye Lane	Kwes
2023 (26th)	The End We Start From	Anna Meredith
2023 (26th)	Femme	Adam Janota Bzowski
2023 (26th)	Girl	Ré Olunuga
2023 (26th)	Scrapper	Patrick Jonsson
2024 (27th)	Kneecap	Michael "Mikey J" Asante
2024 (27th)	Bird	Burial
2024 (27th)	Love Lies Bleeding	Clint Mansell
2024 (27th)	The Outrun	John Gürtler and Jan Miserre
2024 (27th)	Unicorns	Stuart Earl
