= Love Lies Bleeding (2024 film) =

2024 romantic thriller film by Rose Glass

- Theatrical release poster
- Directed by: Rose Glass
- Written by: Rose Glass; Weronika Tofilska
- Produced by: Andrea Cornwell; Oliver Kassman
- Starring: Kristen Stewart; Katy O'Brian; Jena Malone; Anna Baryshnikov; Dave Franco; Ed Harris
- Cinematography: Ben Fordesman
- Edited by: Mark Towns
- Music by: Clint Mansell
- Production companies: A24; Film4; Escape Plan; Lobo Films
- Distributed by: A24 (United States); Lionsgate (United Kingdom)
- Release dates: January 20, 2024 (Sundance); March 8, 2024 (United States); May 3, 2024 (United Kingdom)
- Running time: 104 minutes
- Countries: United Kingdom; United States
- Language: English
- Box office: $12.8 million

Love Lies Bleeding is a 2024 romantic thriller film directed by Rose Glass from a screenplay she co-wrote with Weronika Tofilska, and starring Kristen Stewart, Katy O'Brian, Jena Malone, Anna Baryshnikov, Dave Franco, and Ed Harris. It is an international co-production between the United Kingdom and the United States. Set in 1989, the film's plot follows the lesbian relationship between a reclusive gym manager—who is estranged from her powerful father, a sinister businessman with a criminal history—and an ambitious bodybuilder who gets wrapped up in the father's web of violence and coverups.

Love Lies Bleeding premiered at the Sundance Film Festival on January 20, 2024. It was released theatrically in the United States by A24 on March 8, 2024, and in the United Kingdom by Lionsgate UK on May 3, 2024. The film received positive reviews from critics and was named one of the Top Ten Independent Films of 2024 by the National Board of Review.

== Plot ==
In a rural New Mexican town in 1989, reclusive gym manager Lou navigates relationships with her sister Beth, Beth's husband JJ, and flirtatious friend Daisy. One night while at the gym, Lou is approached by FBI agents in search of information about Lou's estranged father, Lou Sr., and his criminal ties. Shortly after, Lou meets Jackie, a bisexual bodybuilder staying in town while preparing for a competition in Las Vegas. Lou offers Jackie steroids to enhance her training and though she initially refuses, Jackie agrees. After a night of sex, Jackie and Lou move in together. They fall in love over the following weeks as Jackie uses increasingly high doses of steroids during her training.

Jackie and Lou attend an awkward dinner with JJ and Beth, during which Lou threatens JJ over his abusive behavior towards Beth. In retaliation, JJ reveals he and Jackie had sex on her first night in town in exchange for a waitressing position at Lou Sr.'s gun range. Disgusted and angry, Lou tells Jackie that she wants to kill JJ because of his abuse of Beth, who is the only reason Lou hasn't left town.

The next day, Beth is hospitalized due to severe abuse inflicted by JJ. At her bedside, Lou Sr. promises to protect Beth and deal with JJ. Unable to contain her rage due to steroid use, Jackie secretly breaks into Beth and JJ's home and brutally beats the latter to death. Lou discovers JJ's body, and fearing Jackie will be arrested, plots to frame her father for the murder. With Jackie's help, Lou loads JJ's body into his car and drives it over a cliff into a ravine revealed to be a disposal site for the bodies of Lou Sr.'s various criminal enemies. Lou lights the car on fire, creating a massive smoke plume that she knows will attract the authorities to the site the following morning.

The next day, Lou returns to JJ and Beth's home to clean up evidence of the murder while Jackie continues her steroid use, growing more agitated. After an argument, Jackie leaves Lou and hitchhikes to Las Vegas for the bodybuilding competition. During her individual routine, Jackie hallucinates vomiting up a fully grown Lou before assaulting another contestant, leading to her arrest.

Meanwhile, armed with knowledge of Lou and Jackie's involvement with JJ's murder after spotting the duo out driving the night before, Daisy blackmails Lou into a relationship. After Daisy intercepts Jackie's phone call from jail to Lou, Jackie contacts Lou Sr. to bail her out of jail. After doing so, Lou Sr. coerces Jackie to kill Daisy, the sole person connecting the women to the murder. After shooting Daisy at Lou's apartment, Jackie returns to Lou Sr., only to be knocked unconscious. Lou Sr. calls Lou and tells her that he has arranged for Jackie to take the rap for the deaths of JJ and Daisy, but Lou, who has helped her father kill in the past, announces her intention to cooperate with the FBI investigation if he sets Jackie up.

Lou Sr. sends a police officer on his payroll to kill Lou, but she returns fire and kills him before driving to her father's home to rescue Jackie. At Lou Sr.'s manor, Beth, who has learned about her involvement with JJ's death, denounces Lou to her face. Lou finds and frees Jackie, but as they try to escape, Lou Sr. shoots Lou in the leg. Jackie, having grown to a gigantic size, pins down Lou Sr., and Lou considers killing him before deciding to leave him for the police.

Lou and Jackie, back to her normal size, drive off together. The next morning, Lou realizes that Daisy is still alive in the truck bed despite her near-fatal wound. She strangles Daisy and dumps her body in a nearby field while Jackie sleeps.

== Cast ==
- Kristen Stewart as Lou, a reclusive gym manager
- Katy O'Brian as Jackie, a rising bodybuilder
- Anna Baryshnikov as Daisy, a woman who is obsessed with Lou
- Dave Franco as JJ, Beth's husband
- Jena Malone as Beth, Lou's sister
- Ed Harris as Lou Sr., Lou's estranged father

== Production ==
Love Lies Bleeding is a co-production between A24 and Film4. It is the second film to be directed by English filmmaker Rose Glass. Kristen Stewart first mentioned her involvement in the film in March 2022, as she was a fan of Glass' previous work, Saint Maud (2019); her casting was confirmed in April. Anna Baryshnikov, Katy O'Brian, Dave Franco, Ed Harris, and Jena Malone joined the cast in June. O'Brian said in an interview that she had to audition for the part, her first leading role, six times.

Principal photography began in Albuquerque, New Mexico, in June 2022. Production concluded by August 2022.

== Release ==
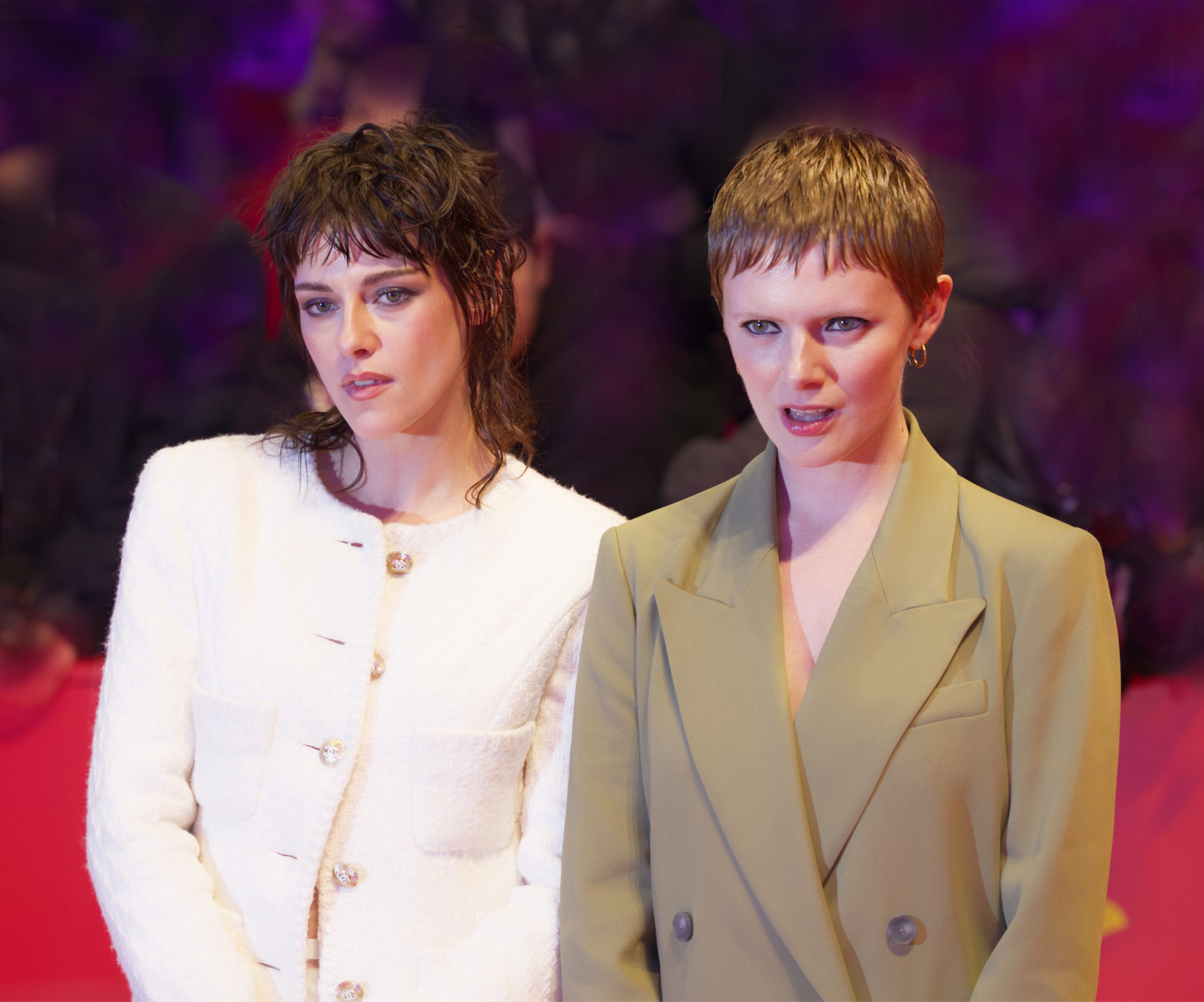
Kristen Stewart and director Rose Glass at the 74th Berlin International Film Festival

Love Lies Bleeding had its world premiere in the Midnight section at the 2024 Sundance Film Festival on January 20, 2024, followed by its European premiere on February 18 at the 74th Berlin International Film Festival in the Berlinale Special Gala section. The UK premiere was held at the Glasgow Film Festival on February 28.

The film was released on five screens in New York City and Los Angeles by A24 on March 8, 2024, before expanding wide on March 15. Lionsgate UK acquired the British distribution rights to the film in November 2023 and it was released theatrically in the United Kingdom on May 3, 2024.

== Reception ==
=== Box office ===
Love Lies Bleeding grossed $8.3 million in the United States and Canada and $4.2 million in other territories for a total of $12.5 million.

In its opening weekend, the film made $276,618 from five theaters, a per-venue average of $55,324. Expanding to 1,362 theaters the following weekend, the film made $2.5 million, finishing sixth at the box office.

=== Critical response ===
On the review aggregator website Rotten Tomatoes, 94% of 263 critics' reviews are positive, with an average rating of 7.8/10. The website's consensus reads: "Lust and violence collide to powerfully pulpy effect in Love Lies Bleeding, a well-acted addition to writer-director Rose Glass' growing body of exceptional work." Metacritic, which uses a weighted average, assigned the film a score of 77 out of 100, based on 53 critics, indicating "generally favorable" reviews. Audiences polled by PostTrak gave the film a 78% overall positive score with an average 3.5 out of 5 stars.

Manohla Dargis of The New York Times wrote that the film, likely influenced by the works of James M. Cain, Jim Thompson, David Lynch, and the Coen brothers, "For the most part ... manages to transcend its influences enough to remain engaging; sometimes it does something even more interesting with its reference points ... Glass borrows liberally but not mindlessly." Saffron Maeve, for the Toronto Star, gave the film 3.5 stars out of 4, writing that "Love Lies Bleeding becomes increasingly convoluted ... But this narrative estrangement is grounded in intention".

Director John Waters ranked Love Lies Bleeding first in a list of his favorite movies of 2024, saying the "hilarious, bloody film noir is the best movie of the year, one that Russ Meyer might have made if he had been a lesbian intellectual addicted to steroids."

=== Accolades ===
Award	Date of ceremony	Category	Recipient(s)	Result	Ref.
Astra Midseason Movie Awards	July 3, 2024	Best Picture	Love Lies Bleeding	Nominated	
Astra Midseason Movie Awards	July 3, 2024	Best Actress	Kristen Stewart	Nominated	
Astra Midseason Movie Awards	July 3, 2024	Best Supporting Actress	Katy O'Brian	Won	
Astra Midseason Movie Awards	July 3, 2024	Best Indie	Love Lies Bleeding	Won	
Belgian Film Critics Association	January 4, 2025	Grand Prix	Love Lies Bleeding	Nominated	
British Independent Film Awards	December 8, 2024	Best British Independent Film	Rose Glass, Weronika Tofilska, Andrea Cornwell, and Oliver Kassman	Nominated	
British Independent Film Awards	December 8, 2024	Best Director	Rose Glass	Nominated	
British Independent Film Awards	December 8, 2024	Best Joint Lead Performance	Katy O'Brian and Kristen Stewart	Nominated	
British Independent Film Awards	December 8, 2024	Best Screenplay	Rose Glass and Weronika Tofilska	Nominated	
British Independent Film Awards	December 8, 2024	Best Casting	Mary Vernieu and Lindsay Graham Ahanonu	Nominated	
British Independent Film Awards	December 8, 2024	Best Cinematography	Ben Fordesman	Won	
British Independent Film Awards	December 8, 2024	Best Costume Design	Olga Mill	Nominated	
British Independent Film Awards	December 8, 2024	Best Effects	James Allen	Nominated	
British Independent Film Awards	December 8, 2024	Best Make-Up & Hair Design	Megan Daum and Frieda Valenzuela	Nominated	
British Independent Film Awards	December 8, 2024	Best Original Music	Clint Mansell	Nominated	
British Independent Film Awards	December 8, 2024	Best Production Design	Katie Hickman	Nominated	
British Independent Film Awards	December 8, 2024	Best Sound	Paul Davies, Andrew Stirk, Linda Forsén, Rose Bladh, and Tim Burns	Nominated	
Golden Trailer Awards	May 30, 2024	Best Thriller	"Threat" (AV Squad)	Nominated	
Gotham Awards	December 2, 2024	Outstanding Supporting Performance	Katy O'Brian	Nominated	
Independent Spirit Awards	February 22, 2025	Best Breakthrough Performance	Katy O'Brian	Nominated	
National Board of Review	December 4, 2024	Top Ten Independent Films	Love Lies Bleeding	Honored	
San Diego Film Critics Society	December 9, 2024	Best Original Screenplay	Rose Glass and Weronika Tofilska	Nominated	
