= British Independent Film Awards 2024 =

Awards ceremony

27th British Independent Film Awards
- Awarded for: Best in British independent film
- Date: 8 December 2024
- Site: Roundhouse, London
- Official website: www.bifa.film

Highlights
- Best Film: Kneecap
- Most awards: Kneecap (7)
- Most nominations: Kneecap (14)

The British Independent Film Awards 2024 was held on 8 December 2024 to recognise the best in British independent cinema and filmmaking talent from United Kingdom. The ceremony took place at the Roundhouse in London after being held previously for fourteen years at Old Billingsgate.

The nominations were announced on 5 November 2024 by actors Mia McKenna-Bruce and Vivian Oparah at One Hundred Shoreditch, London. Irish musical film Kneecap led the nominations with 14, followed by Love Lies Bleeding and The Outrun with 12 and 9 respectively.

== Winners and nominees ==
The winner of craft categories were announced on 26 November 2024. The winners for the remaining categories were announced on 8 December 2024.

Best British Independent Film	Best Director
Kneecap – Rich Peppiatt, Trevor Birney and Jack Tarling; Love Lies Bleeding – Rose Glass, Weronika Tofilska, Andrea Cornwell and Oliver Kassman; On Becoming a Guinea Fowl – Rungano Nyoni, Tim Cole, Ed Guiney and Andrew Lowe; The Outrun – Nora Fingscheidt, Amy Liptrot, Sarah Brocklehurst, Dominic Norris, Jack Lowden and Saoirse Ronan; Santosh – Sandhya Suri, Mike Goodridge, James Bowsher, Balthazar de Ganay and Alan McAlex	Rungano Nyoni – On Becoming a Guinea Fowl; Andrea Arnold – Bird; Nora Fingscheidt – The Outrun; Rose Glass – Love Lies Bleeding; Rich Peppiatt – Kneecap
Best Lead Performance	Best Supporting Performance
Marianne Jean-Baptiste – Hard Truths as Pansy Deacon; Radhika Apte – Sister Midnight as Uma; Susan Chardy – On Becoming a Guinea Fowl as Shula; Elliot Page – Close to You as Sam; Saoirse Ronan – The Outrun as Rona; Alicia Vikander – The Assessment as Virginia	Franz Rogowski – Bird as Bird; Michele Austin – Hard Truths as Chantelle; Elizabeth Chisela – On Becoming a Guinea Fowl as Nsansa; Barry Keoghan – Bird as Bug; Jack O'Connell – Back to Black as Blake Fielder-Civil; Hayley Squires – Hoard as Cynthia
Best Joint Lead Performance	Breakthrough Performance
Liam Óg Ó Hannaidh, Naoise Ó Cairealláin and JJ Ó Dochartaigh – Kneecap as themselves (Mo Chara, Móglaí Bap and DJ Próvaí); Joseph Quinn and Saura Lightfoot-Leon – Hoard as Michael and Maria; Katy O'Brian and Kristen Stewart – Love Lies Bleeding as Jackie Cleaver and Louise "Lou" Langston; Jason Patel and Ben Hardy – Unicorns as Aysha and Luke	Susan Chardy – On Becoming a Guinea Fowl as Shula; Nykiya Adams – Bird as Bailey; Saura Lightfoot-Leon – Hoard as Maria; Ruaridh Mollica – Sebastian as Max Williamson; Jason Patel – Unicorns as Aysha
Best Screenplay	Best Documentary
Santosh – Sandhya Suri; The Outrun – Nora Fingscheidt and Amy Liptrot; Love Lies Bleeding – Rose Glass and Weronika Tofilska; On Becoming a Guinea Fowl – Rungano Nyoni; Kneecap – Rich Peppiatt	Witches – Elizabeth Sankey, Jeremy Warmsley, Chiara Ventura and Manon Ardisson; The Contestant – Clair Titley, Megumi Inman, Andee Ryder, Amit Dey and Ian Bonhôte; Grand Theft Hamlet – Pinny Grylls, Sam Crane, Julia Ton and Rebecca Wolff; Super/Man: The Christopher Reeve Story – Ian Bonhôte, Peter Ettedgui, Lizzie Gillett and Robert Ford; Two Strangers Trying Not to Kill Each Other – Jacob Perlmutter, Manon Ouimet and Signe Byrge Sørensen
Best International Independent Film	Best Short Film
Anora – Sean Baker, Alex Coco and Samantha Quan; All We Imagine as Light – Payal Kapadia, Thomas Hakim and Julien Graff; La Chimera – Alice Rohrwacher, Carlo Cresto-Dina and Paolo Del Brocco; No Other Land – Basel Adra, Rachel Szor, Hamdan Ballal, Yuval Abraham, Fabrien Greenberg and Bård Kjøge Rønning; The Seed of the Sacred Fig – Mohammad Rasoulof, Rozita Hendijanian, Amin Sadraei, Jean-Christophe Simon and Mani Tilgner	Wander to Wonder – Nina Gantz, Stienette Bosklopper, Simon Cartwright, Daan Bakker and Maarten Swart; Delivery – Ben Lankester, Bophanie Lun and Joe Binks; Housewarming – Liam White and Guy Lindley; Meat Puppet – Eros V, Masha Thorpe and Leah Draws; A Move – Elahe Esmaili and Hossein Behboudi Rad
Best Casting	Best Cinematography
Kneecap – Carla Stronge; Hoard – Heather Basten; On Becoming a Guinea Fowl – Isabella Odoffin; Bird – Lucy Pardee; Love Lies Bleeding – Mary Vernieu and Lindsay Graham Ahanonu	Love Lies Bleeding – Ben Fordesman; Lee – Pawel Edelman; Civil War – Rob Hardy; The Outrun – Yunus Roy Imer; Kneecap – Ryan Kernaghan
Best Costume Design	Best Editing
Firebrand – Michael O'Connor; Kneecap – Zjena Glamocanin; Civil War – Meghan Kasperlik; Love Lies Bleeding – Olga Mill; Unicorns – Nirage Mirage	Kneecap – Julian Ulrichs and Chris Gill; The Outrun – Stephen Bechinger; Bird – Joe Bini; Made in England: The Films of Powell and Pressburger – Margarida Cartaxo and Stuart Davidson; Civil War – Jake Roberts
Best Effects	Best Make-Up & Hair Design
Civil War – David Simpson; Love Lies Bleeding – James Allen; Lee – Glen McGuigan and Ingo Putze	Unicorns – Lisa Mustafa; Love Lies Bleeding – Megan Daum and Frieda Valenzuela; Back to Black – Peta Dunstall; The Outrun – Kat Morgan; Firebrand – Jenny Shircore
Best Original Music	Best Music Supervision
Kneecap – Michael “Mikey J” Asante; Bird – Burial; Unicorns – Stuart Earl; The Outrun – John Gürtler and Jan Miserre; Love Lies Bleeding – Clint Mansell	Kneecap – Gary Welch and Jeanette Rehnstrom; Back to Black – Iain Cooke and Giles Martin; Sister Midnight – Kle Savidge
Best Production Design	Best Sound
The Assessment – Jan Houllevigue; Hoard – Bobbie Cousins; Love Lies Bleeding – Katie Hickman; Civil War – Caty Maxey; Kneecap – Nicola Moroney	Civil War – Glen Freemantle; Kneecap – Louise Burton, Brendan Rehill, Aza Hand and Simon Kerr; Love Lies Bleeding – Paul Davies, Andrew Stirk, Linda Forsén, Rose Bladh and Tim Burns; The Outrun – Dominik Leube, Oscar Stiebitz, Jonathan Schorr and Gregor Bonse; Lee – Mike Prestwood Smith, Csaba Major and Jimmy Boyle
Douglas Hickox Award (Best Debut Director)	Best Debut Screenwriter
Christopher Andrews – Bring Them Down; Luna Carmoon – Hoard; James Krishna Floyd – Unicorns [also directed by Sally El Hosaini]; Karan Kandhari – Sister Midnight; Rich Peppiatt – Kneecap	Rich Peppiatt – Kneecap; James Krishna Floyd – Unicorns; Karan Kandhari – Sister Midnight; Sandhya Suri – Santosh; Mrs & Mr Dave Thomas – The Assessment [also written by John Donnelly]
Breakthrough Producer	The Raindance Maverick Award
Balthazar De Ganay and James Bowsher – Santosh [also produced by Mike Goodridge and Alan McAlex]; Hollie Bryan and Lucy Meer – The Ceremony; Jacob Swan Hyam – Bring Them Down [also produced by Julianne Ford, Ivana Mackinnon, Jean-Yves Roubin, Ruth Treacey and Cassandre Warnauts]; Ben Toye – Treading Water; Rebecca Wolff – Grand Theft Hamlet [also produced by Julia Ton]	Grand Theft Hamlet – Pinny Grylls, Sam Crane, Julia Ton and Rebecca Wolff; The Ceremony – Jack King, Hollie Bryan and Lucy Meer; Restless – Jed Hart and Benedict Turnbull; Satu: Year of the Rabbit – Joshua Trigg; Witches – Elizabeth Sankey, Jeremy Warmsley, Chiara Ventura and Manon Ardisson
Best Debut Director – Feature Documentary
Pinny Grylls and Sam Crane – Grand Theft Hamlet; Manon Ouimet and Jacob Perlmutter – Two Strangers Trying Not to Kill Each Other; Rachel Ramsay – Copa 71 [also directed by James Erskine]; Clair Titley – The Contestant
Richard Harris Award
Sophie Okonedo

=== Films with multiple nominations and awards ===
Films that received multiple nominations
Nominations	Film
14	Kneecap
12	Love Lies Bleeding
9	The Outrun
7	Bird
7	On Becoming a Guinea Fowl
7	Unicorns
6	Civil War
6	Hoard
4	Grand Theft Hamlet
4	Santosh
4	Sister Midnight
3	The Assessment
3	Back To Black
3	Lee
2	Bring Them Down
2	The Ceremony
2	The Contestant
2	Firebrand
2	Hard Truths
2	Two Strangers Trying Not To Kill Each Other
2	Witches

Films that received multiple awards
Awards	Film
7	Kneecap
2	Civil War
2	Grand Theft Hamlet
2	On Becoming a Guinea Fowl
2	Santosh
