= Lily Frazer =

English actress

- Born: Lily Francesca Plummer-Frazer; 23 November 1988 (age 37); Nuneaton, Warwickshire, England
- Occupation: Actress
- Years active: 2011–present
- Spouse: Adam Pritchard (m. 2022)
- Children: 2

Lily Francesca Plummer-Frazer (born 23 November 1988) is an English actress. She was nominated for a WhatsOnStage Award for her performance in the West End production of In the Heights. On television, she is known for her roles in the iPlayer series Ladhood (2019–2022) and the period drama Hotel Portofino (2022–).

== Early life ==
Frazer is from the Nuneaton and Bedworth area of Warwickshire. She took classes at the Wendy Morton Academy of Dance in Atherstone. She went on to pursue a Bachelor of Arts in Musical Theatre at Arts Educational School in London.

== Career ==
After leaving ArtsEd, Frazer was cast in her first West End production, joining the ensemble of the long-running musical Les Misérables at the Queen's Theatre. She was also the second cover for Éponine and took part in the Les Mis Gives… at Christmas cabaret. She workshopped Viva Forever!, the Spice Girls musical. She then joined the ensemble of Jesus Christ Superstar for its arena tour. She went on to star as Demeter in the Bristol Hippodrome production of Cats.

Frazer starred as Nina Rosario in the 2015 West End production of Lin-Manuel Miranda's In the Heights. For her performance, she was nominated for Best Actress in a Musical at the 2016 WhatsOnStage Awards. The following year, she played Michelle Morris in the Dreamgirls revival at the Savoy Theatre.

Frazer appeared in Rose Glass' 2019 horror film Saint Maud. That same year, she joined the main cast of the sitcom Cuckoo for its fifth and final series. She began starring as Jess, the lead character's (Liam Williams) girlfriend, in the BBC iPlayer series Ladhood. She played American guest Claudine Pascal in the 2022 period drama Hotel Portofino.

== Personal life ==
Frazer has taught at Vision Theatre Arts, a children's performing arts programme in Biggleswade. She married Adam Pritchard at Royle Forest on 1 October 2022, having been in a relationship for over ten years. The couple have a daughter (b. 2019 and a son (b.2024)

== Filmography ==
=== Film ===
Year	Title	Role	Notes
2016	The Wastes	Woman	Short film
2017	Guardians	Helen Markus	Short film
2017	Beauty and the Beast	Debutante	
2018	Tomorrow	Jessica	
2019	Rupert, Rupert & Rupert	Assistant	
2019	Saint Maud	Carol	
2019	The Gentlemen	Lisa	
2019	Bad Day	Ruby	Short film
2021	The Unfathomable Mr. Jones	Deanne	
2024	Touchdown	Chloe	

=== Television ===
Year	Title	Role	Notes
2014	Drifters	Suzy	Episode: "Meg's New Job"
2015	Vicious	Cake Shop Assistant	Episode: "Wedding"
2018	The Windsors	Presenter	Episode: "The Windsors Royal Wedding Special"
2018	Urban Myths	Makeup Artist	Episode: "The Sex Pistols Vs. Bill Grundy"
2018	Sally4Ever	Roquette	1 episode
2018	Holby City	Debra Furnish	Episode: "Love Is"
2019	Cuckoo	Tash	Main role (series 5)
2019	Sex Education	Tiana	1 episode
2019	Motherland	Rose	2 episodes
2019–2022	Ladhood	Jess	Main role
2022–present	Hotel Portofino	Claudine Pascal	Main role

=== Web ===
Year	Title	Role	Notes
2016	Resting	Tina	Episode: "Fucked"

=== Music videos ===
Year	Song	Artist	Notes
2016	"Liability"	Kloe	

== Stage ==
Year	Title	Role	Notes
2011	Les Misérables	Ensemble / Éponine (understudy)	Queen's Theatre, London
2011	Viva Forever!	Diamond	Workshop
2012	Jesus Christ Superstar	Ensemble	UK & Ireland tour
2013	Cats	Demeter	Bristol Hippodrome
2015	In the Heights	Nina	King's Cross Theatre, London
2016	Dreamgirls	Michelle Morris	Savoy Theatre, London

== Awards and nominations ==
Year	Award	Category	Work	Result	Ref.
2016	WhatsOnStage Awards	Best Actress in a Musical	In the Heights	Nominated	
