= Rye Lane =

2023 film by Raine Allen-Miller

- Theatrical release poster
- Directed by: Raine Allen-Miller
- Written by: Nathan Bryon; Tom Melia
- Produced by: Yvonne Isimeme Ibazebo; Damian Jones
- Starring: David Jonsson; Vivian Oparah
- Cinematography: Olan Collardy
- Edited by: Victoria Boydell
- Music by: Kwes
- Production companies: DJ Films; Turnover Films; BBC Film; BFI
- Distributed by: Searchlight Pictures (through Buena Vista International)
- Release dates: 23 January 2023 (Sundance); 17 March 2023 (United Kingdom)
- Running time: 82 minutes
- Country: United Kingdom
- Language: English
- Box office: $1.5 million

Rye Lane is a 2023 British romantic comedy film directed by Raine Allen-Miller in her feature directorial debut, from a screenplay by Nathan Bryon and Tom Melia. Set in the South London areas of Peckham and Brixton, the film is titled after the real-life Rye Lane Market. It stars David Jonsson and Vivian Oparah as two strangers who have a chance encounter, after having both been through recent breakups, and spend the day getting to know each other.

Rye Lane had its world premiere at the Sundance Film Festival on 23 January 2023, and was released in cinemas in the United Kingdom on 17 March 2023 by Walt Disney Studios Motion Pictures. The film received critical acclaim, with praise for Jonsson's and Oparah's performances, the film's direction, style, and originality.

== Plot ==
In South London, Yas encounters Dom crying in a gender-neutral toilet at an art exhibition about mouths organised by their mutual friend Nathan. They meet again in the exhibition, and walk through the Rye Lane Market together, bonding over Dom's experience with a failed relationship: Dom was recently cheated on by Gia, his girlfriend of six years, with his best friend Eric and has moved back in with his parents. Dom meets with Gia and Eric at a restaurant for the first time since the breakup; Yas impulsively joins them, posing as Dom's new lover. They pretend to have met while singing karaoke, and leave Gia bewildered.

Dom and Yas have lunch at a tortilla shop. Yas reveals she has recently broken up with her boyfriend Jules, citing his propensity to not wave at tourists on boats as a red flag. When Yas recounts that she has forgotten her copy of A Tribe Called Quest's The Low End Theory at Jules's flat, Dom proposes that they steal her record back. They visit Jules's mothers' house in order to retrieve a key to his flat, but when Dom is caught looking for the key in a knickers drawer by Jules's mothers, he is kicked out. Outside, Yas admits she started hanging out with Dom at first because she felt sorry for him, but came to enjoy their time together and even turned down a job interview that afternoon.

After one of Jules's mothers lends her moped to Yas, she and Dom go to Mona's karaoke bar for Jules's key. In exchange for the key, they must sing karaoke. They sing "Shoop" and Yas kisses Dom afterwards. Breaking into Jules's flat, Yas is furious that Jules's new girlfriend can leave her menstrual cup out when he would not allow her to do so. Dom and Yas get caught by Jules and his girlfriend, and accidentally break Jules's art on their way out. Jules reveals that he was actually the one who broke up with Yas, and Dom is upset that she lied to him. The two fight and Yas throws away her record.

Months pass, with the two going on dates with other people and struggling to forget each other. Yas finally lands a job as a costume designer on a film set while Dom moves out of his parents' house. While attending Nathan's next art exhibition about anuses, Dom receives a phone call from Yas, who makes a grand romantic gesture by waving to Dom from a boat on the River Thames. He waves back at her through the window and runs to meet her. After waiting for the boat to land, the two embrace and passionately kiss.

== Cast ==
- David Jonsson as Dom
- Vivian Oparah as Yas
- Simon Manyonda as Nathan
- Karene Peter as Gia
- Benjamin Sarpong-Broni as Eric
- Malcolm Atobrah as Jules
- Alice Hewkin as Tabby
- Poppy Allen-Quarmby as Cass
- Marva Alexander as Janet
- Llewella Gideon as Tanice
- Gary Beadle as Peter
- Andrew Francis as Dom's dad
- Sandra Daley as Dom's mum
- Omari Douglas as Mona
- Munya Chawawa as restaurant crooner
- Blue Lab Beats as themselves

Colin Firth makes an uncredited cameo appearance in the film as a tortilla chef in a restaurant called Love Guac'tually, a reference to Love Actually.

== Production ==
Principal photography was underway in London in April 2021, when it was revealed that Nathan Bryon had written his first feature film script with Tom Melia, under the working title Vibes & Stuff. Yvonne Isimeme Ibazebo of Turnover Films and Damian Jones of DJ Films produced the film, with assistance and funding from BBC Film, the British Film Institute (BFI), and Searchlight Pictures. It was also revealed in April 2021 that Vivian Oparah and David Jonsson would star in the film.

Jones sent Raine Allen-Miller an invitation to direct the film as suggested by Eva Yates, a BBC Films executive producer who knew Allen-Miller through her 2018 short film Jerk. After boarding the project, Allen-Miller helped to develop the script with Bryon, Melia, and script editor and executive producer Sophie Meyer. Other executive producers include Rose Garnett, Kristin Irving, Paul Grindey, and Charles Moore.

The film was originally going to be set in Camden, North London, before Allen-Miller changed the locations to Brixton and Peckham. Filming locations included the restaurant Coal Rooms, Rye Lane Market, the grocery store Nour Cash & Carry in Brixton Village, the chicken shop Morley's, the Italian restaurant Il Giardino, Brockwell Park, and Peckhamplex.

== Release ==
Rye Lane had its world premiere at the Sundance Film Festival on 23 January 2023. Following its UK premiere at Peckhamplex in London on 8 March 2023, the film was released in cinemas in the United Kingdom and Ireland on 17 March by Searchlight Pictures via Buena Vista International. On 31 March 2023, the film was released on Hulu in the United States, on Star+ in Latin America and on Disney+ in countries including Canada and Australia. It began streaming on Disney+ in the United Kingdom and Ireland on 3 May 2023.

== Reception ==
On the review aggregator website Rotten Tomatoes, 98% of 138 critics' reviews are positive, with an average rating of 8.2/10. The website's consensus reads: "Good news, rom-com fans: Anyone looking for a smart, funny, and heartwarming new addition to the canon can find it waiting on Rye Lane." Metacritic, which uses a weighted average, assigned the film a score of 82 out of 100, based on 31 critics, indicating "universal acclaim".

Robert Daniels of The Playlist wrote, "Not since Spike Lee introduced the world to Bed–Stuy, has a Black director so seamlessly embedded viewers into the verve and flavor of their neighborhood." The Observer critic Mark Kermode described the film as a "hugely enjoyable romp that effortlessly combines the 'limited time' romcom format of Richard Linklater's Before trilogy with the in-your-face visual cheekiness of Peep Show". Gemma West, in the Leicestershire Press, called it "charming, groovy and all too human."

=== Accolades ===
Award	Date of ceremony	Category	Nominee(s)	Result	Ref.
Hollywood Critics Association Midseason Film Awards	30 June 2023	Best Indie	Rye Lane	Nominated	
British Independent Film Awards	3 December 2023	Best British Independent Film	Raine Allen-Miller, Nathan Bryon, Tom Melia, Yvonne Isimeme Ibazebo, and Damian Jones	Nominated	
British Independent Film Awards	3 December 2023	Best Director	Raine Allen-Miller	Nominated	
British Independent Film Awards	3 December 2023	Best Joint Lead Performance	David Jonsson and Vivian Oparah	Nominated	
British Independent Film Awards	3 December 2023	Breakthrough Performance	Vivian Oparah	Won	
British Independent Film Awards	3 December 2023	Best Screenplay	Nathan Bryon and Tom Melia	Nominated	
British Independent Film Awards	3 December 2023	Best Casting	Kharmel Cochrane	Nominated	
British Independent Film Awards	3 December 2023	Best Cinematography	Olan Collardy	Nominated	
British Independent Film Awards	3 December 2023	Best Costume Design	Cynthia Lawrence-John	Nominated	
British Independent Film Awards	3 December 2023	Best Editing	Victoria Boydell	Nominated	
British Independent Film Awards	3 December 2023	Best Make-Up & Hair Design	Bianca Simone Scott	Nominated	
British Independent Film Awards	3 December 2023	Best Original Music	Kwes	Won	
British Independent Film Awards	3 December 2023	Best Music Supervision	David Fish	Nominated	
British Independent Film Awards	3 December 2023	Best Production Design	Anna Rhodes	Nominated	
British Independent Film Awards	3 December 2023	Douglas Hickox Award (Best Debut Director)	Raine Allen-Miller	Nominated	
British Independent Film Awards	3 December 2023	Best Debut Screenwriter	Nathan Bryon and Tom Melia	Nominated	
British Independent Film Awards	3 December 2023	Breakthrough Producer	Yvonne Isimeme Ibazebo	Nominated	
Toronto Film Critics Association	17 December 2023	Best First Feature	Rye Lane	Won	
Black Reel Awards	16 January 2024	Outstanding Breakthrough Performance	Vivian Oparah	Nominated	
Black Reel Awards	16 January 2024	Outstanding International Film	Rye Lane	Won	
Black Reel Awards	16 January 2024	Outstanding Independent Film	Rye Lane	Nominated	
Black Reel Awards	16 January 2024	Outstanding Cinematography	Olan Collardy	Nominated	
British Academy Film Awards	18 February 2024	Best Actress	Vivian Oparah	Nominated	
British Academy Film Awards	18 February 2024	Outstanding British Film	Raine Allen-Miller, Yvonne Isimeme Ibazebo, Damian Jones, Nathan Bryon, and Tom Melia	Nominated	
NAACP Image Awards	16 March 2024	Outstanding International Motion Picture	Rye Lane	Nominated	

== See also ==
- London in film
