= Marcus Hutton =

- Occupation: Actor

Marcus Hutton is an actor and voice over artist who trained at the Guildhall School of Music and Drama. Hutton played Nathan Cuddington in Channel 4's soap opera Brookside from 1998 to 2000. He has also voiced hundreds of radio and TV commercials in the UK and around the world. He has guest starred in the Doctor Who audio dramas The Church and the Crown (2002) and The Kingmaker (2006).

From 2008 to 2009, Hutton toured with Leslie Grantham in Murder with Love.

== Filmography ==
Year	Title	Role	Notes
1989	Doctor Who	Sgt. Leigh	Episode: The Curse of Fenric
1998–2000	Brookside	Nathan Cuddington	Series regular
2007	Hollyoaks	Martin Spencer	1 episode
2010	Made in Dagenham	Grant	
2011	Holby City	Simon Whittle	Episode: Anger Management
2019	Saint Maud	Richard	
2023	Doctors	Dr Nicholas Stevenson	Episode: "Absolutely Cuckoo""
