= How to Have Sex =

2023 film by Molly Manning Walker

- Release poster
- Directed by: Molly Manning Walker
- Written by: Molly Manning Walker
- Produced by: Emily Leo; Ivana MacKinnon; Konstantinos Kontovrakis
- Starring: Mia McKenna-Bruce; Lara Peake; Samuel Bottomley; Shaun Thomas; Enva Lewis; Laura Ambler
- Cinematography: Nicolas Canniccioni
- Edited by: Fin Oates
- Music by: James Jacob
- Production companies: Film4; BFI; mk2 Films; Head Gear Films; Metrol Technology; Umedia; Wild Swim Films; Heretic
- Distributed by: Mubi
- Release dates: 19 May 2023 (Cannes); 3 November 2023 (United Kingdom)
- Running time: 91 minutes
- Countries: United Kingdom; Greece; Belgium
- Language: English
- Box office: $1.2 million

How to Have Sex is a 2023 coming-of-age drama film written and directed by Molly Manning Walker, in her directorial debut. The film stars Mia McKenna-Bruce, Lara Peake and Enva Lewis as three sixteen-year-old best friends who encounter new friendships, sexual pressures and self-discovery during a holiday. The cast also includes Samuel Bottomley, Shaun Thomas and Laura Ambler.

How to Have Sex had its world premiere at the Cannes Film Festival in the Un Certain Regard section on 19 May 2023, ultimately winning that section's top prize. The film was released theatrically by Mubi in the United Kingdom on 3 November 2023, and in the United States on 2 February 2024.

== Plot ==
Tara, Em, and Skye are sixteen-year-old best friends on a rites-of-passage holiday at the party resort of Malia on Crete. Em is registered for college in the autumn, while Tara and Skye are less certain of their futures. The girls look forward to drinking, clubbing, and hooking up in what they think will be the best summer of their lives. Tara, the only virgin of the three, feels pressure to lose her virginity.

Tara talks to Badger, one of the neighbouring guests at their hotel. Badger and his roommate Paddy invite the girls to spend the night partying. Skye is secretly attracted to Badger, openly teases Tara about her lack of experience, and encourages her to lose her virginity to Paddy, while Em intends to hook up with Badger's lesbian friend, Paige. Tara's attraction to Badger disappears when she overhears Badger at an outdoor club, admitting to participating in a game involving multiple strangers performing oral sex on him. She runs into Paddy as she leaves, and he pressures her into having sex on the beach.

Em tells Tara the next day that she spent the night disillusioned and groggy after sex with Paddy, and hooked up with strangers in their villa. Tara, embarrassed, doesn't reveal her sexual experience to Skye, and becomes even more upset by learning she will have to retake her faile school exams. Paddy has turned cold toward Tara poorly when around the others. Badger, made aware of Tara's virginity by Skye's mean-spirited teasing, takes her back to the hotel when she refuses to join in on skinny-dipping at the beach. She falls asleep as they talk, and he puts her to bed and departs.

On the final morning of the trip, Paddy wakes Tara early and tries to initiate sex with her. She rebuffs him and falls asleep, then awakens to find Paddy on top of her. Skye and Badger enter the room, inadvertently ending an intended sexual assault. Skye teases Tara again and she leaves in tears. The girls and boys say their goodbyes in the afternoon. Tara hugs Badger and ignores Paddy. At the airport, Tara ignores Skye's questions about her encounters with Paddy, and confides to Em that Paddy had sex with her while she was asleep. Em reassures Tara that what happened was not "fine" and promises that they will overcome their troubles together.

== Cast ==
- Mia McKenna-Bruce as Tara
- Lara Peake as Skye
- Samuel Bottomley as Paddy
- Shaun Thomas as Badger
- Enva Lewis as Em
- Laura Ambler as Paige
- Eilidh Loan as Fi
- Daisy Jelley as Gemma

== Production ==
Mia McKenna-Bruce, Lara Peake, Shaun Thomas, Samuel Bottomley, Enva Lewis and Laura Ambler joined the cast of the film, with Molly Manning Walker directing from a screenplay she wrote, and shooting in Greece in October 2022, according to Deadline Hollywood, while according to The Guardian, the film was shot on location in Malia, Crete, over two months from September 2021.

== Release and reception ==
How to Have Sex had its world premiere in the Un Certain Regard section of the Cannes Film Festival on 19 May 2023. The film ultimately won that section's top prize.

Prior to its debut, Mubi acquired distribution rights to the film for North America, United Kingdom, Ireland, Italy, Latin America, Turkey and Benelux. It was also invited screened in the Flash Forward section of the 28th Busan International Film Festival on 7 October 2023.

The film was released theatrically in the United Kingdom on 3 November 2023, and in the United States on 2 February 2024.

=== Critical response ===
On the review aggregator website Rotten Tomatoes, 97% of 143 critics' reviews are positive, with an average rating of 8/10. The website's consensus reads: "A powerful debut for Molly Manning Walker, How to Have Sex authentically captures female adolescence and friendship with sobering effervescence." Metacritic, which uses a weighted average, assigned the film a score of 79 out of 100, based on 37 critics, indicating "generally favorable" reviews.

Manning Walker's direction and McKenna-Bruce's performance received praise. The Observer's Wendy Ide wrote, "Walker's handling of the film's tonal range is remarkably assured: the picture is skittish, spirited and very funny, and at the same time troubling and bruisingly sad."

Guy Lodge of Variety described McKenna-Bruce's performance as "star-making", adding the film "lays out the minefield of sexual education and consent for a post-#MeToo generation, with a precision to its ambiguities that will draw gasps from its characters' contemporaries and elders alike".

Clarisse Loughrey of The Independent commented, "Described by its director as loosely autobiographical, How to Have Sex is built around a subtle but devastating rug-pull that exposes the culture of sex and consent in the same way F Scott Fitzgerald put the Jazz Age on blast in The Great Gatsby."

=== Accolades ===
Award / Film Festival	Date of ceremony	Category	Recipient(s)	Result	Ref.
Cannes Film Festival	27 May 2023	Un Certain Regard	Molly Manning Walker	Won	
Cannes Film Festival	27 May 2023	Queer Palm	Molly Manning Walker	Nominated	
Cannes Film Festival	27 May 2023	Caméra d'Or	Molly Manning Walker	Nominated	
Jerusalem Film Festival	23 July 2023	The Nechama Rivilin Award for Best International Film	How to Have Sex	Nominated	
Melbourne International Film Festival	19 August 2023	Bright Horizons Award	How to Have Sex	Nominated	
Zurich Film Festival	8 October 2023	Best International Feature Film	How to Have Sex	Nominated	
Athens International Film Festival	9 October 2023	Best Picture	How to Have Sex	Won	
Valladolid International Film Festival	28 October 2023	Golden Spike	How to Have Sex	Nominated	
Valladolid International Film Festival	28 October 2023	Young Jury Prize Official Section	How to Have Sex	Won	
Valladolid International Film Festival	28 October 2023	Best New Director	Molly Manning Walker	Won	
British Independent Film Awards	3 December 2023	Best Casting	Isabella Odoffin	Won	
British Independent Film Awards	3 December 2023	Best Costume Design	George Buxton	Nominated	
British Independent Film Awards	3 December 2023	Best Make-Up & Hair Design	Natasha Lawes	Nominated	
British Independent Film Awards	3 December 2023	Best Sound	Steve Fanagan	Nominated	
British Independent Film Awards	3 December 2023	Best British Independent Film	Molly Manning Walker, Ivana MacKinnon, Emily Leo, and Konstantinos Kontovrakis	Nominated	
British Independent Film Awards	3 December 2023	Best Director	Molly Manning Walker	Nominated	
British Independent Film Awards	3 December 2023	Best Lead Performance	Mia McKenna-Bruce	Won	
British Independent Film Awards	3 December 2023	Breakthrough Performance	Mia McKenna-Bruce	Nominated	
British Independent Film Awards	3 December 2023	Best Supporting Performance	Samuel Bottomley	Nominated	
British Independent Film Awards	3 December 2023	Best Supporting Performance	Shaun Thomas	Won	
British Independent Film Awards	3 December 2023	Douglas Hickox Award (Best Debut Director)	Molly Manning Walker	Nominated	
British Independent Film Awards	3 December 2023	Best Debut Screenwriter	Molly Manning Walker	Nominated	
British Independent Film Awards	3 December 2023	Best Screenplay	Molly Manning Walker	Nominated	
European Film Awards	9 December 2023	Best Actress	Mia McKenna-Bruce	Nominated	
European Film Awards	9 December 2023	European Discovery	Molly Manning Walker	Won	
European Film Awards	9 December 2023	University Film Award	How to Have Sex	Nominated	
London Film Critics' Circle	4 February 2024	Breakthrough Performer of the Year	Mia McKenna-Bruce	Won	
British Academy Film Awards	18 February 2024	Outstanding British Film	Molly Manning Walker, Emily Leo, Ivana MacKinnon and Konstantinos Kontovrakis	Nominated	
British Academy Film Awards	18 February 2024	Outstanding Debut by a British Writer, Director or Producer	Molly Manning Walker	Nominated	
British Academy Film Awards	18 February 2024	Best Casting	Isabella Odoffin	Nominated	
