= The Wonder (film) =

2022 film by Sebastián Lelio

- Official release poster
- Directed by: Sebastián Lelio
- Screenplay by: Emma Donoghue; Sebastián Lelio; Alice Birch
- Based on: The Wonder by Emma Donoghue
- Produced by: Ed Guiney; Tessa Ross; Andrew Lowe; Juliette Howell
- Starring: Florence Pugh; Tom Burke; Niamh Algar; Elaine Cassidy; Dermot Crowley; Brían F. O'Byrne; David Wilmot; Ruth Bradley; Caolán Byrne; Josie Walker; Ciarán Hinds; Toby Jones; Kíla Lord Cassidy
- Narrated by: Niamh Algar
- Cinematography: Ari Wegner
- Edited by: Kristina Hetherington
- Music by: Matthew Herbert
- Production companies: House Productions; Element Pictures; Screen Ireland
- Distributed by: Netflix
- Release dates: 2 September 2022 (Telluride); 2 November 2022 (United Kingdom and United States); 16 November 2022 (Netflix)
- Running time: 103 minutes
- Countries: Ireland; United Kingdom; United States
- Language: English

The Wonder is a 2022 period psychological drama film directed by Sebastián Lelio. Emma Donoghue, Lelio, and Alice Birch wrote the screenplay based on the 2016 novel of the same name by Donoghue. Set shortly after the Great Famine, it follows an English nurse sent to a rural Irish village to observe a young 'fasting girl', who is seemingly able to miraculously survive without eating. Florence Pugh leads an ensemble cast that includes Tom Burke, Niamh Algar, Elaine Cassidy, Dermot Crowley, Brían F. O'Byrne, David Wilmot, Ruth Bradley, Caolán Byrne, Josie Walker, Ciarán Hinds, Toby Jones, and Kíla Lord Cassidy.

The Wonder premiered at the Telluride Film Festival on 2 September 2022. It had a limited theatrical release on 2 November 2022 and streamed on Netflix on 16 November 2022. It received positive reviews from critics who praised the production design and cast performances, particularly Pugh's.

== Plot ==
In 1862, Elizabeth "Lib" Wright, an English nurse who served in the Crimean War, is sent to a rural village in Ireland where she is tasked with closely watching Anna O'Donnell, a fasting girl who, according to her family, has not eaten for four months. She is to be assisted by a nun, Sister Michael, and the two are to report their findings independently to a council of local dignitaries.

The trauma of the Great Famine still looms over the community, and many locals are wary of the English nurse. Lib meets Anna's deeply religious family: her mother Rosaleen, her father Malachy, and Kitty. At dinner, Lib learns that Anna's elder brother died of an unknown illness. Anna herself appears in good health and says she has been kept alive by consuming "manna from Heaven". At her lodgings, Lib encounters William Byrne, a man who grew up locally and whose family perished in the Great Famine while he was away at boarding school. Now a journalist for the Daily Telegraph, William is reporting on the story, which he believes to be a hoax. Lib and William begin a relationship.

Lib's observations initially reveal no evidence of deception. Anna prays many times a day and speaks of the fate of the damned in Hell. Lib, who is grieving the death of her only child, takes laudanum to help her sleep. Noticing that her mother kisses Anna goodnight on her mouth while cupping her face, Lib deduces that chewed food is being covertly passed to Anna. She forbids the family from touching her. Anna does not deny that this is her "manna", and she discloses to Lib the reasons for her fast: her elder brother had repeatedly raped her, and she attributes his death to God's wrath. Anna believes that by her fasting and prayers, she will free her brother's soul.

Separated from her family's touch, Anna's condition worsens. William files a report to his paper in which he lays the blame for Anna's expected death on her family and the community. Lib informs the council of her findings, but they refuse to believe her. Sister Michael states that she has found no evidence of Rosaleen feeding Anna. Members of the council question Anna, but she repeats that she is sustained solely by "manna from Heaven". Knowing that Anna will inevitably die unless she eats soon, Lib pleads with the family to take action, or at least for her mother to resume the kisses. Rosaleen refuses, saying that after Anna's sacred death, both her children will be in heaven. Lib persuades William to assist with a rescue plan.

While the family are at Mass, Lib brings Anna, now near death, to a nearby holy clootie well. She tells her that although "Anna" will die, she will be reborn as a new girl named "Nan". Anna closes her eyes and appears to die. When she revives, Lib is finally able to feed her. Lib returns to the house alone and sets it ablaze, at the same time deliberately destroying her laudanum bottle. Lib tells the council that Anna died of natural causes and that the fire was an accident. Concerned for their own possible culpability for Anna's death, and the absence of a body within the charred remains of the house, they terminate her employment without pay. Sister Michael tells Lib that, after leaving Mass early, she saw a vision of Anna and an angel leaving the area on horseback. She asks Lib to promise that Anna has gone to a better place, which Lib does.

In Dublin, Lib reunites with William and Nan, who has recovered her health. The three pose as a family named Cheshire and set sail for Sydney. On board, Lib and William watch as Nan eats a full meal.

== Cast ==
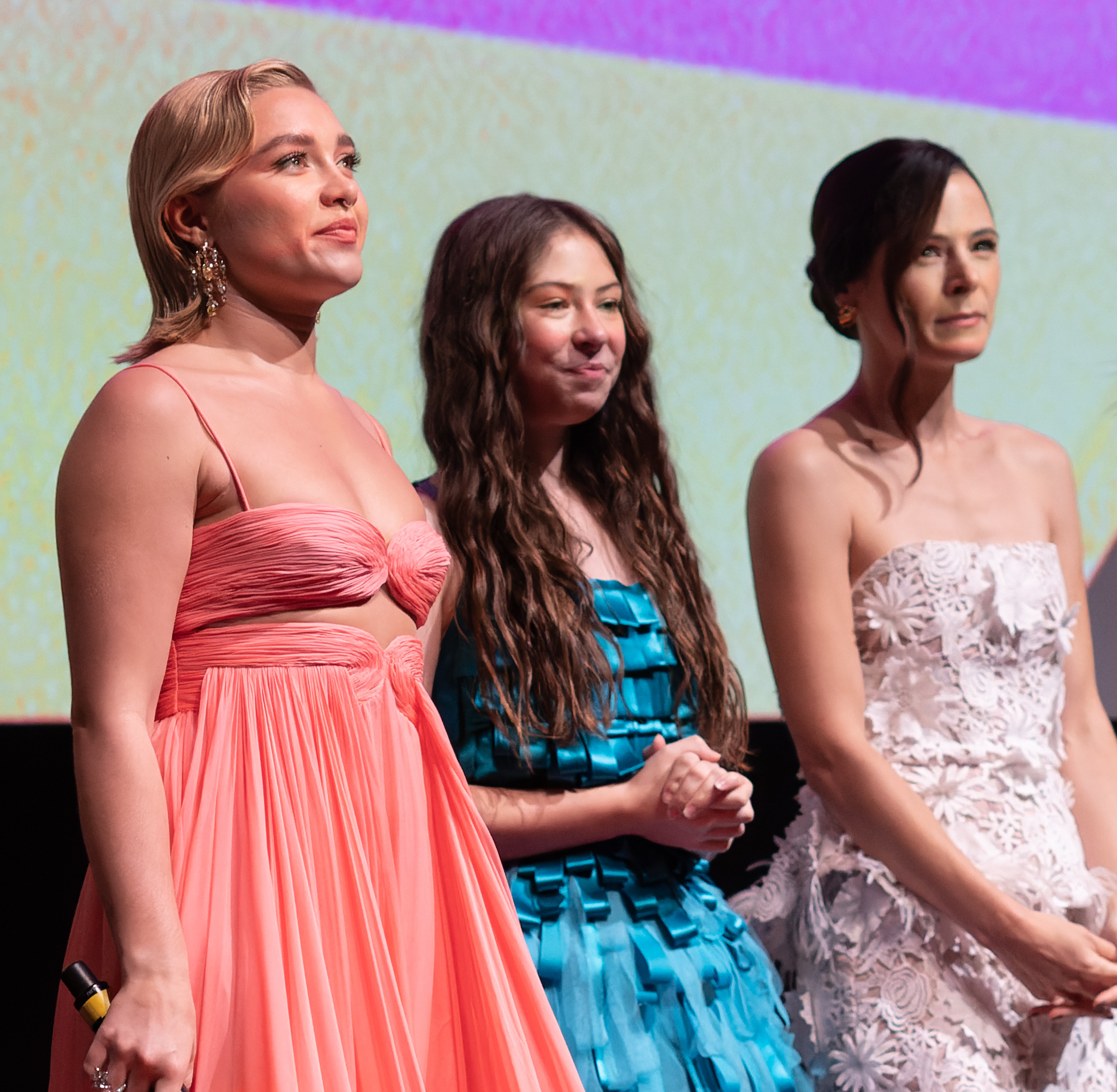
Florence Pugh, Kila Lord Cassidy, and Elaine Cassidy at the BFI London Film Festival Gala, Royal Festival Hall on Friday 7 October 2022

- Florence Pugh as Elizabeth "Lib" Wright
- Kíla Lord Cassidy as Anna O'Donnell / Nan
- Tom Burke as William Byrne
- Niamh Algar as Kitty O'Donnell / The Narrator
- Elaine Cassidy as Rosaleen O'Donnell
- Caolán Byrne as Malachy O'Donnell
- Toby Jones as Dr McBrearty
- Ciarán Hinds as Father Thaddeus
- Dermot Crowley as Sir Otway
- Brían F. O'Byrne as John Flynn
- David Wilmot as Seán Ryan
- Ruth Bradley as Maggie Ryan
- Josie Walker as Sister Michael

== Production ==
On 28 April 2021, it was announced that Florence Pugh was set to star in Sebastián Lelio's adaptation of The Wonder. Principal photography began in Ireland on 12 August 2021. Accompanying the announcement of the start of production, it was reported that Tom Burke, Niamh Algar, Elaine Cassidy, Kíla Lord Cassidy, Toby Jones, Ciarán Hinds, Dermot Crowley, Brían F. O'Byrne and David Wilmot had joined the cast.

== Release ==
The Wonder premiered at the Telluride Film Festival on 2 September 2022, followed by a screening at the 2022 Toronto International Film Festival on 13 September 2022. Its European premiere was at the 70th San Sebastián International Film Festival on 21 September 2022. It was released on Netflix on 16 November 2022, following a limited theatrical release on 2 November.

== Reception ==
On the review aggregator website Rotten Tomatoes, 85% of 171 critics' reviews are positive, with an average rating of 7.2/10. The website's consensus reads: "The atmosphere's absorbing and the story is fascinating, but The Wonder of this period drama really lies in Florence Pugh's remarkable performance." Metacritic, which uses a weighted average, assigned the film a score of 71 out of 100, based on 37 critics, indicating "generally favorable" reviews.

Reviewing the film following its premiere at Telluride, David Ehrlich of IndieWire called it a "sumptuous but slightly undercooked tale", praising Lelio's direction, the performances, the cinematography, and the score. Peter Bruge praised the cast performances in his review for Variety but criticized the screenplay, summarizing it as an "evenhanded but ultimately preposterous adaptation". The Hollywood Reporter’s Stephen Farber found it an "illuminating study of dark prejudices" and commended Pugh's performance, as well as Lelio's direction which he said represents perhaps his "finest achievement to date".

The film has been likened to folk horror, with Meara Isenberg of CNET noting its "rural setting, religious foreboding and general sense of dread". Ed Power of the Irish Examiner described it as "Famine trauma meets folk horror", calling it a "gripping film ... full of buried secrets and festering evil".

== Accolades ==
Award	Date of ceremony	Category	Recipient(s)	Result	Ref.
British Independent Film Awards	4 December 2022	Best British Independent Film	Sebastián Lelio, Emma Donoghue, Alice Birch, Juliette Howell, Andrew Lowe, Tessa Ross, Ed Guiney	Nominated	
British Independent Film Awards	4 December 2022	Best Director	Sebastián Lelio	Nominated	
British Independent Film Awards	4 December 2022	Best Lead Performance	Florence Pugh	Nominated	
British Independent Film Awards	4 December 2022	Breakthrough Performance	Kíla Lord Cassidy	Nominated	
British Independent Film Awards	4 December 2022	Best Screenplay	Sebastián Lelio, Alice Birch and Emma Donoghue	Nominated	
British Independent Film Awards	4 December 2022	Cinematography	Ari Wegner	Nominated	
British Independent Film Awards	4 December 2022	Best Costume Design	Odile Dicks-Mireaux	Nominated	
British Independent Film Awards	4 December 2022	Best Make-Up & Hair Design	Morna Ferguson, Lorry Ann King	Nominated	
British Independent Film Awards	4 December 2022	Best Original Music	Matthew Herbert	Won	
British Independent Film Awards	4 December 2022	Best Production Design	Grant Montgomery	Nominated	
British Independent Film Awards	4 December 2022	Best Sound	Hugh Fox, Ben Baird	Nominated	
British Independent Film Awards	4 December 2022	Best Ensemble Performance	Kíla Lord Cassidy, Florence Pugh, Tom Burke, Toby Jones, Niamh Algar, Elaine Cassidy, Ciarán Hinds, Brían F. O'Byrne, Josie Walker	Nominated	
National Board of Review	8 December 2022	Top 10 Independent Films	The Wonder	Won	
Alliance of Women Film Journalists	5 January 2023	Best Screenplay, Adapted	Alice Birch, Emma Donoghue, Sebastian Lelio	Nominated	
Alliance of Women Film Journalists	5 January 2023	Best Woman Screenwriter	Alice Birch	Nominated	
London Film Critics' Circle	5 February 2023	British/Irish Film of the Year	The Wonder	Nominated	
London Film Critics' Circle	5 February 2023	Actress of the Year	Florence Pugh	Nominated	
London Film Critics' Circle	5 February 2023	British/Irish Actress of the Year (for body of work)	Florence Pugh	Won	
London Film Critics' Circle	5 February 2023	Supporting Actor of the Year	Tom Burke	Nominated	
London Film Critics' Circle	5 February 2023	Young British/Irish Performer of the Year	Kila Lord Cassidy	Nominated	
London Film Critics' Circle	5 February 2023	Technical Achievement Award	Nina Gold	Nominated	
British Academy Film Awards	19 February 2023	Outstanding British Film	Sebastián Lelio, Ed Guiney, Juliette Howell, Andrew Lowe, Tessa Ross, Alice Birch, Emma Donoghue	Nominated	
Irish Film & Television Awards	7 May 2023	Best Film	The Wonder	Nominated	
Irish Film & Television Awards	7 May 2023	International Actress	Florence Pugh	Nominated	
Irish Film & Television Awards	7 May 2023	Supporting Actress – Film	Elaine Cassidy	Nominated	
Irish Film & Television Awards	7 May 2023	Supporting Actress – Film	Kíla Lord Cassidy	Nominated	
Irish Film & Television Awards	7 May 2023	Hair & Makeup	Lorri Ann King, Morna Ferguson	Nominated	
Irish Film & Television Awards	7 May 2023	Sound	The Wonder	Nominated	
