= Femme (film) =

2023 film by Sam H. Freeman and Ng Choon Ping

- Theatrical release poster
- Directed by: Sam H. Freeman; Ng Choon Ping
- Screenplay by: Sam H. Freeman; Ng Choon Ping
- Based on: Femme by: Sam H. Freeman; Ng Choon Ping
- Produced by: Myles Payne; Sam Ritzenberg
- Starring: Nathan Stewart-Jarrett; George MacKay; Aaron Heffernan; John McCrea; Asha Reid
- Cinematography: James Rhodes
- Edited by: Selina Macarthur
- Music by: Adam Janota Bzowski
- Production companies: Agile Films; Anton; BBC Film
- Distributed by: Signature Entertainment
- Release dates: 19 February 2023 (Berlinale); 1 December 2023 (United Kingdom)
- Running time: 99 minutes
- Country: United Kingdom
- Language: English
- Box office: $385,589

Femme is a 2023 British thriller film written and directed by Sam H. Freeman and Ng Choon Ping in their feature debut. It is a feature-length adaptation of their BAFTA-nominated 2021 short film of the same name. The film stars Nathan Stewart-Jarrett, George MacKay, Aaron Heffernan, John McCrea and Asha Reid. The plot follows Jules, a London drag performer who is traumatised after being brutally attacked by a closeted man named Preston. Months later, Jules recognises Preston in a gay sauna and sets out to exact revenge on his assailant.

The film premiered in the Panorama section of the 73rd Berlin International Film Festival on 19 February 2023. It was released in cinemas in the United Kingdom on 1 December 2023 by Signature Entertainment.

== Plot ==
Drag performer Jules has just finished one of his shows at an East London nightclub when he goes outside to smoke before realising he is out of cigarettes. He spots a heavily tattooed young man, Preston, watching him from afar. Preston then abruptly leaves. Later, Jules goes into a convenience shop to buy cigarettes in full drag. He again encounters Preston, now accompanied by several friends. They begin to hurl homophobic slurs at Jules, who retorts that he saw Preston checking him out. Enraged, Preston follows Jules out of the shop and brutally assaults him.

Three months later, Jules has stopped performing drag and become reclusive. One night, he goes to a gay sauna, where he is surprised to see Preston, who does not appear to recognise him out of drag. Jules follows him to the changing room, where Preston invites him back to his flat; Jules accepts. When the two arrive, they begin to have sex before Preston's friends arrive, interrupting them. Jules borrows Preston's fake designer hoodie—the one Preston was wearing during the assault—and pretends he is there to buy drugs and leaves, but not before he gives Preston his phone number. Jules decides to exact revenge on Preston for the assault by filming them having sex and posting it online.

Jules begins dating Preston, and they have sex several more times, with Preston enjoying dominating Jules. On one occasion, Preston spots Jules filming their encounter on his mobile phone. Angry, he takes Jules's phone and deletes the footage. However, he soon calms down, and the two have sex again, though less aggressive than before.

One night, Jules is on his way to Preston's flat when Preston's friends arrive and disrupt their plans. Jules is invited by Preston's friends to spend time with them and eventually go to a bar with them, which he does. Throughout the night, Jules stealthily flirts with and teases Preston, eventually leading the two to return to Jules's house, where Jules begins to dominate Preston. With Preston's consent, Jules films the two of them having sex.

The following day, Preston enjoys breakfast with Jules's two roommates, one of whom secretly invites him to Jules's birthday celebration, where Jules will perform in drag for the first time since the assault. As Preston goes to leave, he kisses Jules. Jules then prepares to post the footage online but ultimately decides against it. On the night of the party, Preston arrives with a present for Jules and gives it to Jules's roommate to look after. Not realising Preston is in the audience, Jules arrives on stage in drag, where he begins to tell a story about a "gay basher" he has seduced. Preston finally realises that Jules is the drag queen he assaulted months earlier, and becomes overwhelmed and starts to panic.

Preston ambushes Jules backstage, revealing that he knows who Jules is. He threatens Jules and demands to know who has seen the footage. Jules explains that he has not shown anyone and changed his mind after getting to know Preston. Ultimately, the two engage in a violent fight that ends with Preston almost strangling Jules to death. However, Preston collapses in tears and lets Jules go. Battered and bloodied from the fight, Jules leaves Preston sobbing and returns home to find Preston's gift-wrapped present on his bed. He opens it; it is an authentic designer hoodie to replace the fake one that Jules took from Preston earlier.

== Cast ==
- Nathan Stewart-Jarrett as Jules
- George MacKay as Preston
- Aaron Heffernan as Oz
- John McCrea as Toby
- Asha Reid as Alicia
- Peter Clements as Anton
- Charley Palmer Rothwell as Jack
- Moe Bar-El as Donovan
- Nima Taleghani as Bijan
- Jackson Milner as Lee
- Anita-Joy Uwajeh as Lydia
- Antonia Clarke as Molly
- John Leader as Calvin

== Production ==
Harris Dickinson and Paapa Essiedu led the 2021 short. In May 2022, it was announced that George Mackay and Nathan Stewart-Jarrett would lead the feature-length adaptation. Directors Sam H. Freeman and Ng Choon Ping credit producer Sam Ritzenberg and Agile Films founder Myles Payne helping them get the idea off the ground when they originally boarded the short.

Principal photography began in London in June 2022.

== Release ==
Femme had its world premiere in the Panorama section of the 73rd Berlin International Film Festival on 19 February 2023. In May 2023, Utopia acquired North American distribution rights to the film, while Signature Entertainment acquired UK and Ireland distribution rights in August. It was released in cinemas in the United Kingdom on 1 December 2023. In the United States, Femme was released in select cinemas on 22 March 2024.

== Reception ==
=== Critical response ===
On the review aggregator website Rotten Tomatoes, the film holds an approval rating of 93% based on 86 reviews, with an average rating of 8/10. The website's critics consensus reads, "Sexually charged and riddled with tension, Femme redresses the noir genre and may leave audiences biting their nails to the nub." Metacritic, which uses a weighted average, assigned the film a score of 69 out of 100, based on 14 critics, indicating "generally favourable" reviews.

=== Accolades ===
Award	Year	Category	Recipient(s)	Result	Ref.
Berlin International Film Festival	2023	GWFF Best First Feature Award	Sam H. Freeman, Ng Choon Ping, Myles Payne and Sam Ritzenberg	Nominated	
Berlin International Film Festival	2023	Teddy Award for Best Feature Film	Sam H. Freeman and Ng Choon Ping	Nominated	
British Independent Film Awards	2023	Best Costume Design	Buki Ebiesuwa	Won	
British Independent Film Awards	2023	Best Make-Up & Hair Design	Marie Deehan	Won	
British Independent Film Awards	2023	Best Cinematography	James Rhodes	Nominated	
British Independent Film Awards	2023	Best Music	Adam Janota Bzowski	Nominated	
British Independent Film Awards	2023	Best Music Supervision	Ciara Elwis	Nominated	
British Independent Film Awards	2023	Best British Independent Film	Sam H. Freeman, Ng Choon Ping, Myles Payne and Sam Ritzenberg	Nominated	
British Independent Film Awards	2023	Best Director	Sam H. Freeman and Ng Choon Ping	Nominated	
British Independent Film Awards	2023	Best Joint Lead Performance	Nathan Stewart-Jarrett and George MacKay	Won	
British Independent Film Awards	2023	Best Screenplay	Sam H. Freeman and Ng Choon Ping	Nominated	
British Independent Film Awards	2023	The Douglas Hickox Award for Best Debut Director	Sam H. Freeman and Ng Choon Ping	Nominated	
British Independent Film Awards	2023	Best Debut Screenwriter	Sam H. Freeman and Ng Choon Ping	Nominated	
Jerusalem Film Festival	2023	Best International Debut	Sam H. Freeman and Ng Choon Ping	Nominated	
Valladolid International Film Festival	2023	Recoletas Award for Best Feature Film	Sam H. Freeman and Ng Choon Ping	Won	
Zurich Film Festival	2023	Best International Feature Film	Sam H. Freeman and Ng Choon Ping	Nominated	
