= Saint Maud =

2019 British psychological horror film by Rose Glass

- Theatrical release poster
- Directed by: Rose Glass
- Written by: Rose Glass
- Produced by: Andrea Cornwell; Oliver Kassman
- Starring: Morfydd Clark; Jennifer Ehle; Lily Frazer; Lily Knight; Marcus Hutton; Turlough Convery; Rosie Sansom
- Cinematography: Ben Fordesman
- Edited by: Mark Towns
- Music by: Adam Janota Bzowski
- Production companies: Film4; BFI; Escape Plan Productions
- Distributed by: StudioCanal
- Release dates: 8 September 2019 (TIFF); 9 October 2020 (United Kingdom)
- Running time: 84 minutes
- Country: United Kingdom
- Language: English
- Budget: $2.5 million
- Box office: $1.6 million

Saint Maud is a 2019 British psychological horror film written and directed by Rose Glass in her feature directorial debut. The film stars Morfydd Clark as a newly-converted religious private carer who becomes dangerously fixated with saving the soul of her patient. Jennifer Ehle, Lily Frazer, Lily Knight, Marcus Hutton, Turlough Convery and Rosie Sansom appear in supporting roles.

Saint Maud premiered at the Toronto International Film Festival on 8 September 2019, and was released theatrically in the United Kingdom on 9 October 2020 by StudioCanal. It received critical acclaim, with particular praise for Glass' direction and screenplay, the performances of Clark and Ehle, and Fordesman's cinematography. At the 74th British Academy Film Awards, Glass was nominated for Outstanding British Film and Outstanding Debut by a British Writer, Director or Producer. The film earned a record seventeen nominations at the British Independent Film Awards 2020 and won two, Best Cinematography for Fordesman and the Douglas Hickox Award for Glass.

== Plot ==
Katie, a nurse, is unable to save the life of a patient in her care, despite attempting CPR.

Some time later, Katie, referring to herself as Maud, has become a devout Roman Catholic and is working as a private palliative care nurse in an English seaside town. She is assigned to care for Amanda, a hedonistic former dancer and choreographer from the US who is terminally ill with stage four lymphoma. Amanda is embittered by her fate and confesses to Maud that she fears the oblivion of death. Maud comes to believe that God has tasked her with saving the atheist Amanda's soul. Maud reveals to Amanda that she sometimes feels God's presence, and she and Amanda appear to be overcome with ecstasy as they pray together.

Maud becomes suspicious of Amanda's companion Carol, who visits regularly and with whom Amanda has sex. She implores Carol to stop visiting because she believes Amanda's soul is in jeopardy due to distractions of the flesh. Carol is incensed by this, accusing Maud of homophobia, but Maud rebukes this stating that she would not care whether Carol were a man or a woman. When Carol attends Amanda's birthday party, and in front of Maud, Amanda informs the partygoers that Maud has tried to drive Carol away. The party guests laugh at Maud, call her "Saint Maud", and wrap a cover on her head. Amanda mocks Maud for trying to save her soul and suggests that she is a homophobic prude, jealous of her relationship with Carol. Maud strikes Amanda and is dismissed from her job.

Believing that God has rejected her, Maud visits a pub to find companionship but is rejected by most of the people she encounters. She goes home with a man, and during sex she suffers flashbacks of the death of her patient and her attempts at CPR, which causes her to stop. The man initially appears sympathetic but then rapes Maud who initially resists and then appears to dissociate. As she is leaving, he taunts her by revealing that he remembers she'd hooked up with a friend of his during her hedonistic past.

While out walking, Maud encounters Amanda's new nurse and storms off when she realizes that her replacement enjoys a good relationship with Amanda. In her decrepit apartment, Maud begs for a sign from God, who appears to tell her to be ready for an act that will demonstrate her faith. Repentant of her actions, Maud assembles a spugna for her right foot to practice the mortification of the flesh.

That night, Maud, dressed in a makeshift robe and wearing rosary beads, enters Amanda's house after the care nurse leaves. She finds Amanda in bed, weakened. Amanda asks forgiveness for mocking her faith, and Maud joyously reminds her of the time they experienced God's presence. Amanda reveals that she feigned the experience and that she believes God is not real. Maud recoils in horror as a now-demonic Amanda hurls her across the room and mocks her for needing to prove her faith. In a delirious frenzy, Maud stabs Amanda with a pair of scissors, killing her.

In the morning, Maud wanders onto a beach and douses herself with acetone peroxide before horrified onlookers. She utters her last words in Welsh—"Glory to God"—as she self-immolates. In her last moments, angel wings appear upon her, and the onlookers kneel in awe as Maud looks up to the sky, glowing with grace. A smash cut for a split second reveals the reality of Maud being burned alive and screaming in agony.

== Cast ==
- Morfydd Clark as Katie/Maud
- Jennifer Ehle as Amanda Köhl
- Lily Frazer as Carol
- Lily Knight as Joy
- Marcus Hutton as Richard
- Turlough Convery as Christian
- Rosie Sansom as Ester
- Carl Prekopp as Homeless Pat
- Noa Bodner as Hilary
- Takatsuna Mukai as Hiro
- Brian Jackson as a drummer

== Production ==
The film was developed by Escape Plan Productions with funding from Film4 Productions and the British Film Institute. In November 2018, it was announced Clark and Ehle had joined the cast of the film, with Rose Glass directing from her own screenplay. Principal photography began that same month in North London and Scarborough, and lasted for five weeks.

== Release ==
Saint Maud had its world premiere at the Toronto International Film Festival on 8 September 2019. Shortly afterwards, A24 and StudioCanal acquired North American and UK distribution rights to the film, with Diaphana Distribution acquiring French distribution rights and Sony Pictures Worldwide Acquisitions acquiring rights for all remaining territories. It also screened at Fantastic Fest on 19 September 2019, and the BFI London Film Festival on 5 October 2019. The film went on to receive a Special Commendation in the Official Competition section of the London Film Festival, with the jury president, Wash Westmoreland, saying, "This dazzling directorial debut marks the emergence of a powerful new voice in British cinema."

It was originally scheduled to be released in the United States on 10 April 2020, and in the United Kingdom on 1 May 2020. However, due to the COVID-19 pandemic, the release was postponed in the United States until 17 July 2020, and was later pulled entirely from the schedule. It was released theatrically in the United Kingdom on 9 October 2020, and on DVD and Blu-ray on 1 February 2021. It was given a limited theatrical release in the United States on 29 January 2021, followed by video on demand and Epix on 12 February 2021.

== Reception ==
=== Critical response ===
On the review aggregator website Rotten Tomatoes, 92% of 193 critics' reviews are positive, with an average rating of 8/10. The website's consensus reads: "A brilliantly unsettling blend of body horror and psychological thriller, Saint Maud marks an impressive debut for writer-director Rose Glass." Metacritic, which uses a weighted average, assigned the film a score of 83 out of 100, based on 35 critics, indicating "universal acclaim".

Director Danny Boyle described Saint Maud as "a genuinely unsettling and intriguing film. Striking, affecting and mordantly funny at times, its confidence evokes the ecstasy of films like Carrie, The Exorcist, and Jonathan Glazer's Under the Skin." Katie Rife of The A.V. Club gave the film a grade of "B+", saying that the finale was "shocking". In a review for Common Sense Media, Danny Brogan wrote, "A deeply unsettling, yet superb first feature film from director and writer Rose Glass, this psychological horror is far more than just jump-scares – though there are plenty of those too. At the heart of Saint Maud is loneliness and how it can manifest. Maud is a deeply lonely character, whose need for redemption and a desire to belong, all contribute to form a dangerous cocktail with devastating consequences."

Film critic Mark Kermode listed it as his favourite film of 2020, calling it an "electrifying debut".

In July 2025, The Hollywood Reporter ranked it number 15 on its list of the "25 Best Horror Movies of the 21st Century."

=== Accolades ===
Year	Award	Category	Recipient(s)	Result
2021	41st London Film Critics' Circle Awards	Film of the Year	Saint Maud	Nominated
2021	41st London Film Critics' Circle Awards	Director of the Year	Rose Glass	Nominated
2021	41st London Film Critics' Circle Awards	Actress of the Year	Morfydd Clark	Nominated
2021	41st London Film Critics' Circle Awards	Supporting Actress of the Year	Jennifer Ehle	Nominated
2021	41st London Film Critics' Circle Awards	Screenwriter of the Year	Rose Glass	Nominated
2021	41st London Film Critics' Circle Awards	British/Irish Film of the Year	Saint Maud	Won
2021	41st London Film Critics' Circle Awards	British/Irish Actress of the Year	Morfydd Clark	Won
2021	41st London Film Critics' Circle Awards	Breakthrough British/Irish Filmmaker of the Year	Rose Glass	Won
2021	23rd British Independent Film Awards	Best British Independent Film	Rose Glass, Andrea Cornwell, Oliver Kassman	Nominated
2021	23rd British Independent Film Awards	Best Director	Rose Glass	Nominated
2021	23rd British Independent Film Awards	Best Actress	Morfydd Clark	Nominated
2021	23rd British Independent Film Awards	Best Supporting Actress	Jennifer Ehle	Nominated
2021	23rd British Independent Film Awards	Best Screenplay	Rose Glass	Nominated
2021	23rd British Independent Film Awards	The Douglas Hickox Award (Best Debut Director)	Rose Glass	Won
2021	23rd British Independent Film Awards	Best Debut Screenwriter	Rose Glass	Nominated
2021	23rd British Independent Film Awards	Breakthrough Producer	Oliver Kassman	Nominated
2021	23rd British Independent Film Awards	Best Casting	Kharmel Cochrane	Nominated
2021	23rd British Independent Film Awards	Best Cinematography	Ben Fordesman	Won
2021	23rd British Independent Film Awards	Best Costume Design	Tina Kalivas	Nominated
2021	23rd British Independent Film Awards	Best Editing	Mark Towns	Nominated
2021	23rd British Independent Film Awards	Best Effects	Scott MacIntyre, Baris Kareli, Kristyan Mallett	Nominated
2021	23rd British Independent Film Awards	Best Make-Up & Hair Design	Jacquetta Levon	Nominated
2021	23rd British Independent Film Awards	Best Music	Adam Janota Bzowski	Nominated
2021	23rd British Independent Film Awards	Best Production Design	Paulina Rzeszowska	Nominated
2021	23rd British Independent Film Awards	Best Sound	Paul Davies, Simon Farmer, Andrew Stirk	Nominated
2021	74th British Academy Film Awards	Outstanding British Film	Rose Glass, Andrea Cornwell, Oliver Kassman	Nominated
2021	74th British Academy Film Awards	Outstanding Debut by a British Writer, Director or Producer	Rose Glass, Oliver Kassman	Nominated
2021	30th British Academy Cymru Awards	Best Actress	Morfydd Clark	Won
2022	24th Fangoria Chainsaw Awards	Best First Feature	Saint Maud	Won
2022	24th Fangoria Chainsaw Awards	Best Director	Rose Glass	Nominated
2022	24th Fangoria Chainsaw Awards	Best Lead Performance	Morfydd Clark	Nominated
2022	24th Fangoria Chainsaw Awards	Best Supporting Performance	Jennifer Ehle	Nominated
2022	24th Fangoria Chainsaw Awards	Best Screenplay	Rose Glass	Nominated

== Stage adaptation ==
In 2024, Jessica Andrews adapted Saint Maud with director Jack McNamara for the Live Theatre Company.
