= Scrapper (2023 film) =

Film by Charlotte Regan

- Film poster
- Directed by: Charlotte Regan
- Written by: Charlotte Regan
- Produced by: Theo Barrowclough
- Starring: Lola Campbell; Harris Dickinson; Alin Uzun
- Cinematography: Molly Manning Walker
- Edited by: Billy Sneddon; Matteo Bini
- Music by: Patrick Jonsson
- Production companies: BFI; BBC Film; DMC Film
- Distributed by: Picturehouse Entertainment
- Release dates: 23 January 2023 (Sundance); 25 August 2023 (United Kingdom)
- Running time: 84 minutes
- Country: United Kingdom
- Language: English
- Box office: $1.2 million

Scrapper is a 2023 British comedy drama film written and directed by Charlotte Regan in her feature debut. It stars Lola Campbell, Alin Uzun and Harris Dickinson and was produced by BBC Film, BFI and DMC Film.

The film premiered at the 2023 Sundance Film Festival, where it won the Grand Jury Prize for the World Cinema Dramatic Competition, and was released in cinemas in the United Kingdom on 25 August 2023. It received positive reviews and got 14 nominations at the 2023 British Independent Film Awards. It was also named one of the top 10 independent films of 2023 by the National Board of Review.

== Plot ==
In London, twelve-year-old Georgie has been living alone since her mother Vicky died, pretending to social services that she is being cared for by her uncle. Only her friend Ali knows the truth, and helps her steal bikes to support herself. Georgie believes that she is working through the five stages of grief, but insists on keeping her home exactly as Vicky left it, and comforts herself with a video on her phone of her and her mother.

Georgie's summer holiday is thrown into disarray by the arrival of her estranged father Jason, whom she has never met. Determined to stay, he threatens to reveal Georgie's secret to social services when she tells him to get out. Jason, who has been living in Ibiza selling nightclub tickets, wins over Ali, but Georgie is not swayed, especially after finding a bullet in his pocket.

Jason attempts to reach out to Georgie by helping her scrape the serial number off a stolen bike, but any trust between them is lost when he angrily catches her snooping through his phone. Georgie has a falling out with Ali after he defends Jason, and one of her baby teeth falls out during dinner. She wakes up as Jason is trying to slip money under her pillow; he is surprised she is unfamiliar with the tooth fairy, but she refuses the money.

Jason joins Georgie as she attempts to steal a bike, and they narrowly escape the police, only to realise that evening that she has lost her phone. Storming off to search for it, Georgie crosses paths with her schoolmate Layla and, in a moment of rage, beats her up. That night, Georgie sleeps in a room in her flat that she keeps padlocked, where she imagines climbing a tower of scrap metal into the sky.

Georgie bonds with Jason as he takes her metal detecting in a field, where he plants a bracelet for her. He explains that it was his favourite childhood hobby, having found the bullet as a boy and kept it ever since. He buys Georgie a cake, which she leaves on Layla's doorstep. At home, she explains what happened, and he upsets Layla's mother by offering money as an apology.

That night, Jason cuts the padlock and enters Georgie's private room, where she has begun building a tower out of scrap metal with plans to reach her mother in Heaven. Georgie wakes up to find Jason has gone, leaving behind his mobile phone and instructions to listen to a voicemail from Vicky, begging Jason to come home and be a father to Georgie.

Georgie searches fruitlessly for Jason until she finds him at a playground, playing football with some boys. He explains that he wanted to tell her about the voicemail but was too cowardly, and Georgie admits that she wants him in her life. Agreeing that they will both make mistakes, Jason and Georgie embrace life together as father and daughter.

Social services are no wiser to the fact that Georgie's uncle never existed; Layla is happy with the cake and to have got two weeks off school; and Georgie and Jason continue to steal bikes and get on well with one another. As she repaints her living room with her father, Georgie reconciles with Ali.

== Cast ==
- Lola Campbell as Georgie
- Alin Uzun as Ali
- Cary Crankson as Mr. Barrowclough
- Carys Bowkett as Emily
- Ambreen Razia as Zeph
- Ayokunle Oyesanwo as Kunle
- Ayobami Oyesanwo as Bami
- Ayooluwa Oyesanwo as Luwa
- Freya Bell as Layla
- Jessica Fostekew as Sian
- Asheq Akhtar as Youseff
- Joshua Frater-Loughlin as Josh
- Aylin Tezel as Nina
- Olivia Brady as Vicky
- Harris Dickinson as Jason
- Laura Aikman as Kaye

== Production ==
Regan says that she and producer Theo Barrowclough wanted to make an "imperfect film that took risks". They wanted to give "the kids control of the film and for it to feel as messy as Georgie's mind." They were inspired by Taika Waititi's films like Boy, in which the character occasionally talks to the camera.

Principal photography took place in East London in mid-2021. Regan said that the Limes Farm housing estate in Chigwell was chosen for because of the "sense of community, where all the balconies look out on to where the kids play." Because, she says, "you don't get [those estates] in London much any more" the filmmakers had to "go a little bit further out to look for it."

Actor Harris Dickinson had previously worked with writer and director Regan and producer Barrowclough on the 2019 short film Oats & Barley. Dickinson told Deadline that he "really wanted to work with those guys again. I read the script and liked the story and saw Lola's tape and thought it would be an interesting thing to do." Funding came from DMC Film, BFI, BBC Films, Great Point Media, and Creative England.

In May 2022, France-based company Charades picked up the film to handle worldwide distributing rights. In February 2023, Charades revealed the rights had been sold to Picturehouse (UK) and Madman Entertainment (Australia), among others.

== Release ==
Scrapper premiered at the 2023 Sundance Film Festival, where it won the Grand Jury Prize for the World Cinema Dramatic Competition. Scrapper was released in theatres on 25 August 2023.

Scrapper was released on DVD by Kino Lorber on 7 November 2023.

== Reception ==
=== Critical response ===
On the review aggregator website Rotten Tomatoes, 94% of 112 critics' reviews are positive, with an average rating of 7.4/10. The website's consensus reads: "Like a cold treat on a hot day, Scrapper delivers two scoops of a sweet father-daughter dramedy best consumed when in need of a hug." Metacritic, which uses a weighted average, assigned the film a score of 74 out of 100, based on 25 critics, indicating "generally favorable" reviews.

Leslie Felperin in The Hollywood Reporter praised the performance of the leads, saying Dickinson "brings soulfulness to his rapscallion hitherto-absentee dad Jason, and total newcomer Lola Campbell, who brings natural comic timing to her turn as 12-year-old protagonist Georgie". Damon Wise in Deadline Hollywood also mentioned the two leads, saying: "Scrapper is essentially a two-hander, since the fat-free plot is essentially the two getting to know each other and finding out whether they might even like each other… Campbell [is] something of a find, in a spiky role that brings a refreshing, unsentimental edge to this after-Aftersun story". Adding: "It's also good to see a kitchen-sink drama that doesn't take itself overly seriously, but the downside of that is that Scrapper sometimes seems a little flippant, given that, smart as she is, our plucky heroine is still a vulnerable child, all alone in the world. Still, it's early days in Regan's career, and it will be interesting to see what other kinds of stories and genres she has in her offbeat sights".

Variety writer Guy Lodge highlighted the pastel coloured palette of the film, which "offers a sunnier take on familiar kitchen-sink territory, but is occasionally a touch too cute". He described the work of director of photography Molly Manning Walker as "vibrant, stock-shifting lensing" which "deftly negotiates the film's toggling impulses between social and magic realism". Production designer Elena Muntoni is said to strike "a clever balance between mundanely escapist decorative flourishes — like the cotton-candy clouds painted on a bedroom wall — and Georgie's actual flights of fantasy, like the scrap-metal tower she builds to the sky in a locked spare room. Reality eventually makes cruel but necessary intrusions in her life, and in Regan's film too: Both are stronger for the disruption."

In The Guardian, Peter Bradshaw mentioned Regan as one of the best debuts in film of 2023.

=== Awards and nominations ===
Awards and nominations for Scrapper
Award	Date of ceremony	Category	Recipient(s)	Result	Ref.
British Independent Film Awards	3 December 2023	Best British Independent Film	Scrapper	Nominated	
British Independent Film Awards	3 December 2023	Best Director	Charlotte Regan	Nominated	
British Independent Film Awards	3 December 2023	Best Joint Lead Performance	Lola Campbell and Harris Dickinson	Nominated	
British Independent Film Awards	3 December 2023	Breakthrough Performance	Lola Campbell	Nominated	
British Independent Film Awards	3 December 2023	Best Screenplay	Charlotte Regan	Nominated	
British Independent Film Awards	3 December 2023	Best Casting	Shaheen Baig	Nominated	
British Independent Film Awards	3 December 2023	Best Cinematography	Molly Manning Walker	Nominated	
British Independent Film Awards	3 December 2023	Best Costume Design	Oliver Cronk	Nominated	
British Independent Film Awards	3 December 2023	Best Music	Patrick Jonsson	Nominated	
British Independent Film Awards	3 December 2023	Best Production Design	Elena Muntoni	Nominated	
British Independent Film Awards	3 December 2023	Best Sound	Ben Baird, Jack Wensley, Adam Fletcher, and Alexej Mungersdorff	Nominated	
British Independent Film Awards	3 December 2023	Douglas Hickox Award (Best Debut Director)	Charlotte Regan	Nominated	
British Independent Film Awards	3 December 2023	Best Debut Screenwriter	Charlotte Regan	Nominated	
British Independent Film Awards	3 December 2023	Breakthrough Producer	Theo Barrowclough	Won	
Sydney Film Festival	18 June 2023	Best Film	Scrapper	Nominated	
European Film Awards	9 December 2023	Young Audience Award	Scrapper	Won	
