= Molly Manning Walker =

British cinematographer, screenwriter, and director

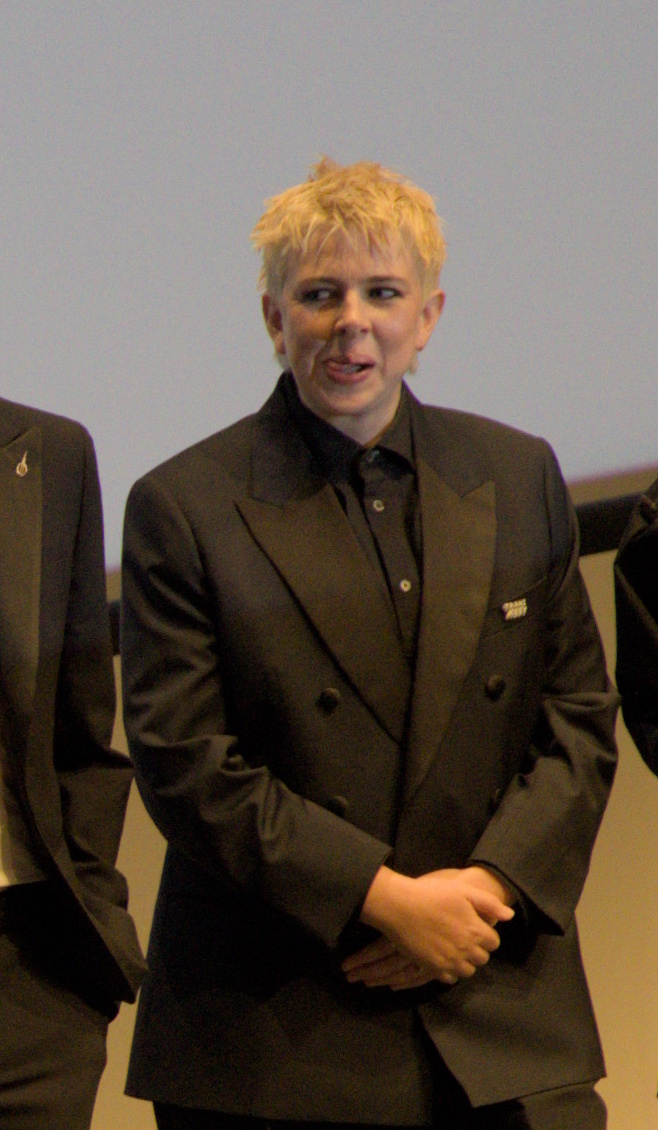
- Born: Molly Andi Amy Manning-Walker; 14 September 1993 (age 33)
- Education: Arts University Bournemouth (BA); National Film and Television School (MA)
- Years active: 2012–present
- Family: Charlie Manning-Walker (brother)

Molly Manning Walker (born 14 September 1993) is a British film director, writer, and cinematographer. Her debut feature film How to Have Sex (2023) won the Un Certain Regard Award at the 2023 Cannes Film Festival and the European Discovery – Prix FIPRESCI at the 36th European Film Awards. In 2024, she earned two nominations at the 77th British Academy Film Awards for How to Have Sex, including Outstanding British Film and Outstanding Debut by a British Writer, Director or Producer.

== Early life and education ==
Manning Walker was born in the West London Borough of Ealing, the daughter of theatre and film creatives Andy Walker and Lesley Manning. Her older brother Charlie Manning-Walker is a member of the band Chubby and the Gang.

Manning Walker attended Elthorne Park High School and then the private school St Augustine's Priory. She was interested in photography in school and invited to photograph an Occupy London event, which Manning Walker turned into a documentary. She went on to study Cinematography at Arts University Bournemouth, graduating with a Bachelor of Arts (BA) degree in 2015, and the National Film and Television School, graduating with a Master of Arts (MA) degree in 2018.

== Career ==
Manning rose to prominence as a cinematographer before attracting acclaim for her directing, shooting dozens of short films and music videos from the early 2010s until the early 2020s.

In 2023, Manning served as the cinematographer on Charlotte Regan's debut feature Scrapper.

Her debut feature, How to Have Sex, was developed with Film4. How to Have Sex won the Un Certain Regard Award at the 2023 Cannes Film Festival and the European Discovery – Prix FIPRESCI at the 36th European Film Awards. In 2024, she earned two nominations at the 77th British Academy Film Awards for How to Have Sex, including Outstanding British Film and Outstanding Debut by a British Writer, Director or Producer.

In 2025, Manning was selected as the head of the jury for the Un Certain Regard section of the 78th Cannes Film Festival.

Manning began developing her first television series with A24 and Channel 4 in 2025, titled Major Players. The series will "follows two girls on the brink of adulthood and their mission to start a women’s football team." Production on the series began in September of that year.

In April 2026, it was announced that A24 and Plan B would produce Walker's next movie, Not Another F**king Wedding. The two companies previously worked together for the films Moonlight (2016) and Minari (2020).

== Personal life ==
Manning Walker co-founded the Sunday league football team Babes City FC.

Walker chose Andrea Arnold's Fish Tank (2009) as her top film of all time when asked by Criterion.

== Filmography ==
Short films

Year	Title	Director	Writer	Cinematographer	Notes
2012	Out of Tune	No	No	Yes	
2015	More Hate Than Fear	No	Yes	Yes	
2015	Khadejah	No	No	Yes	
2016	The Worlds My Oyster	Yes	No	Yes	Documentary short
2016	Softly Softly Catchy Monkey	No	No	Yes	
2017	Lead	No	No	Yes	
2017	Cabin Pressure	No	No	Yes	
2017	Shrink	No	No	Yes	
2018	Reach	No	No	Yes	
2018	Uneatable	No	No	Yes	
2019	My Mother	No	No	Yes	
2019	La Entrevista	No	No	Yes	
2019	Seven	No	No	Yes	
2019	Deep Clean	No	No	Yes	
2019	City of Children	No	No	Yes	Documentary short
2019	One Liner	No	No	Yes	
2019	November 1st	No	No	Yes	
2019	Pompeii	No	No	Yes	
2019	Our Sister	No	No	Yes	
2019	Absent	No	No	Yes	
2020	The Forgotten C	Yes	Yes	Yes	
2020	Acrimonious	No	No	Yes	
2020	Good Thanks, You?	Yes	Yes	No	

Feature films

Year	Title	Director	Writer	Cinematographer
2023	Scrapper	No	No	Yes
2023	How to Have Sex	Yes	Yes	No

Music videos

Year	Title	Director	Writer	Cinematographer
2017	Kwaye, "Little Ones"	No	No	Yes
2018	Tom Walker, "My Way"	No	No	Yes
2018	A$AP Rocky, "Sundress"	No	No	Yes
2019	James Blake, "Can't Believe the Way We Flow"	No	No	Yes
2020	645AR ft. FKA Twigs, "Sum Bout U"	No	No	Yes

TV

Year	Title	Director	Writer	Cinematographer
TBA	Major Players	Yes	Yes	Yes

== Awards ==
Her 2020 short film Good Thanks, You? was selected at the Critics' Week in Cannes. Her grad film November 1st took Bronze at the Student Academy Awards, and Manning-Walker was nominated at Camerimage in 2019. Her debut feature film How to Have Sex (2023) won the Un Certain Regard Award at the 2023 Cannes Film Festival and the European Discovery – Prix FIPRESCI at the 36th European Film Awards.

In 2024, she received two nominations at the 77th British Academy Film Awards for How to Have Sex, including Outstanding British Film and Outstanding Debut by a British Writer, Director or Producer.
