= British Independent Film Awards 2020 =

- Date: 18 February 2021
- Website: www.bifa.film

The British Independent Film Awards 2020 were held in early February 2021 to recognise the best in British independent cinema and filmmaking talent from United Kingdom. The nominations were announced on 9 December 2020 with Saint Maud leading with 17 nominations, followed by Rocks and His House with 16 each.

== Winners and nominees ==
Best British Independent Film	Best Director
Rocks - Sarah Gavron, Ameenah Ayub Allen, Faye Ward, Theresa Ikoko and Claire Wilson; Calm with Horses - Nick Rowland, Joe Murtagh and Daniel Emmerson; The Father - Florian Zeller, Christopher Hampton, David Parfitt, Jean-Louis Livi and Philippe Carcassonne; His House - Remi Weekes, Aidan Elliott, Martin Gentles, Arnon Milchan, Edward King and Roy Lee; Saint Maud - Rose Glass, Andrea Cornwell and Oliver Kassman	Remi Weekes - His House; Nick Rowland - Calm with Horses; Florian Zeller - The Father; Sarah Gavron - Rocks; Rose Glass - Saint Maud
Best Actor	Best Actress
Anthony Hopkins - The Father as Anthony; Cosmo Jarvis - Calm with Horses as Arm; Sope Dirisu - His House as Bol; Amir El-Masry - Limbo as Omar; Riz Ahmed - Mogul Mowgli as Zed	Wunmi Mosaku - His House as Rial; Clare Dunne - Herself as Sandra; Andrea Riseborough - Luxor as Hana; Bukky Bakray - Rocks as Olushola "Rocks" Omotoso; Morfydd Clark - Saint Maud as Maud
Best Supporting Actor	Best Supporting Actress
D’angelou Osei Kissiedu - Rocks as Emmanuel Omotoso; Barry Keoghan - Calm with Horses as Dymphna; Harris Dickinson - County Lines as Simon; Merab Ninidze - The Courier as Oleg Penkovsky; Alyy Khan - Mogul Mowgli as Bashir	Kosar Ali - Rocks as Sumaya; Niamh Algar - Calm with Horses as Ursula; Ashley Madekwe - County Lines as Tony; Fiona Shaw - Kindred as Margaret; Jennifer Ehle - Saint Maud as Amanda
Best Screenplay	Most Promising Newcomer
Florian Zeller and Christopher Hampton - The Father; Remi Weekes - His House; Bassam Tariq and Riz Ahmed - Mogul Mowgli; Theresa Ikoko and Claire Wilson - Rocks; Rose Glass - Saint Maud	Kosar Ali - Rocks; Niamh Algar - Calm with Horses; Conrad Khan - County Lines; Frankie Box - Perfect 10; Bukky Bakray - Rocks
Best Documentary	Best British Short Film
The Reason I Jump - Jerry Rothwell, Jeremy Dear, Stevie Lee and Al Morrow; The Australian Dream - Daniel Gordon, Stan Grant, Sarah Thomson; Being a Human Person - Fred Scott, Mike Brett, Seve Jamisonand, Jo Jo Ellison; Rising Phoenix - Ian Bonhôte, Peter Ettedgui, John Battsek, Greg Nugent and Tatyana McFadden; White Riot - Rubika Shah and Ed Gibbs	The Long Goodbye - Aneil Karia, Riz Ahmed and Tom Gardner; Filipiñana - Rafael Manuel and Naomi Pacifique; The Forgotten C - Molly Manning Walker and Jessi Gutch; Mandem - John Ogunmuyiwa and Emily Everdee; Sudden Light - Sophie Littman and Tom Wood
The Douglas Hickox Award (Best Debut Director)	Best Debut Screenwriter
Rose Glass - Saint Maud; Nick Rowland - Calm with Horses; Henry Blake - County Lines; Remi Weekes - His House; Eva Riley - Perfect 10	Riz Ahmed - Mogul Mowgli; Joe Murtagh - Calm with Horses; Remi Weekes - His House; Theresa Ikoko and Claire Wilson - Rocks; Rose Glass - Saint Maud
Breakthrough Producer	The Raindance Discovery Award
Irene Gurtubai - Limbo; Daniel Emmerson - Calm with Horses; Edward King and Martin Gentles - His House; Douglas Cox - Host; Oliver Kassman - Saint Maud	Perfect 10 - Eva Riley, Jacob Thomas, Bertrand Faivre and Valentina Brazzini; Justine - Jamie Patterson, Jeff Murphy, Jason Rush, Sarah Drew and Julius Beltrame; Looted - Rene Van Pannevis, Kefi Chadwick, Jennifer Eriksson and Jessie Magnum; One Man and His Shoes - Yemi Bamiro and Will Thorne; Rose: A Love Story - Jennifer Sheridan, April Kelley, Sara Huxley, Matt Stokoe, Rob Taylor and Sophie Rundle
Best International Independent Film	Best Casting
Nomadland - Chloé Zhao, Frances McDormand, Peter Spears, Mollye Asher and Dan Janvey; Babyteeth - Shannon Murphy, Alex White and Rita Kalnejais; Les Misérables - Toufik Ayadi, Christophe Barral, Ladj Ly, Giordano Gederlini and Alexis Manenti; Never Rarely Sometimes Always - Eliza Hittman, Adele Romanski and Sara Murphy; Notturno - Gianfranco Rosi, Donatella Palermo, Paolo Del Brocco, Serge Lalou, Camille Laemlé, Orwa Nyrabia and Eva-Maria Weerts	Lucy Pardee - Rocks; Shaheen Baig - Calm with Horses; Carmen Cuba - His House; Dan Jackson - Limbo; Kharmel Cochrane - Saint Maud
Best Cinematography	Best Costume Design
Ben Fordesman - Saint Maud; Jo Willems - His House; Nick Cooke - Limbo; Annika Summerson - Mogul Mowgli; Hélène Louvart - Rocks	Charlotte Walter - Misbehaviour; Michael O'Connor - Ammonite; Ruka Johnson - Rocks; Tina Kalivas - Saint Maud; Michele Clapton - The Secret Garden
Best Editing	Best Effects
Yorgos Lamprimos - The Father; Julia Bloch - His House; Brenna Rangott - Host; Maya Maffioli - Rocks; Mark Towns - Saint Maud	His House - Pedro Sabrosa and Stefano Pepin; Saint Maud - Scott Macintyre, Baris Kareli and Kristyan Mallett; Undergods - Agnes Asplunt and Martin Malmqvist
Best Make Up & Hair Design	Best Music
Jill Sweeney - Misbehaviour; Ivana Primorac - Ammonite; Sharon A. Martin - His House; Nora Robertson - Rocks; Jacquetta Levon - Saint Maud	Paul Corley - Mogul Mowgli; Roque Baños - His House; Nainita Desai - The Reason I Jump; Connie Farr and Emilie Levienaise-Farrouch - Rocks; Adam Janota Bzowski - Saint Maud
Best Production Design	Best Sound
Jacqueline Abrahams - His House; Peter Francis - The Father; Cristina Casali - Misbehaviour; Paulina Rzeszowska - Saint Maud; Marketa Kkorinkova and Elo Soode - Undergods	The Reason I Jump - Nick Ryan, Ben Baird and Sara de Oliveira Lima; His House - Adrian Bell, Glenn Freemantle, Frank Kruse, Brendan Nicholson and Richard Pryke; Host - Calum Sample; Mogul Mowgli - Paul Davies, Robert Faar, Nigel Albermaniche and Ian Morgan; Saint Maud - Paul Davies

=== Films with multiple nominations and awards ===
Films that received multiple nominations
Nominations	Film
17	Saint Maud
16	Rocks
16	His House
10	Calm with Horses
7	Mogul Mowgli
6	The Father
4	Limbo
4	County Lines
4	Host
3	The Reason I Jump
3	Perfect 10
3	Misbehaviour
2	Undergods
2	Ammonite

=== Films with multiple awards ===
Films that received wins
Awards	Film
5	Rocks
4	His House
3	The Father
2	Misbehaviour
2	Mogul Mowgli
2	Saint Maud
2	The Reason I Jump
