= London Film Critics Circle Awards 2020 =

Edition of British film award

41st London Film Critics' Circle Awards

7 February 2021

Film of the Year:
Nomadland

British/Irish Film of the Year:
Saint Maud

The 41st London Film Critics' Circle Awards honoured the best in film of 2020, as chosen by the London Film Critics' Circle. The event was held virtually on the Critics' Circle's YouTube channel for the first time on 7 February 2021, with awards presented by member critics who serve on the event's organising committee and acceptance videos from almost all of the winners. An in-person celebration with nominees and winners occurred later in the year along with long-time sponsors The May Fair Hotel and Audi. The nominations were announced on 12 January 2021; due to the then-rising COVID-19 pandemic, more films released directly to streaming services were made eligible, and the qualifying release dates were extended into March 2021, as long as films had been screened in 2020 to critics or at festivals.

== Winners and nominees ==
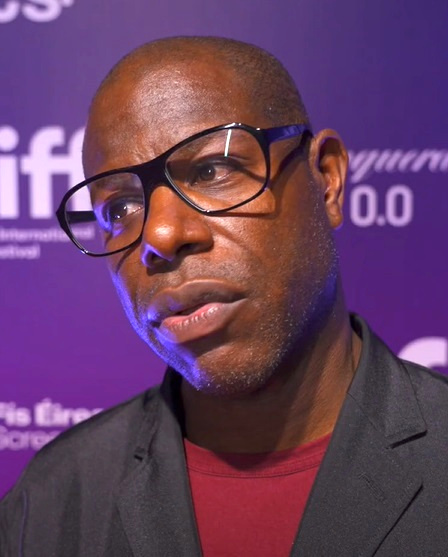
Steve McQueen, Director of the Year winner

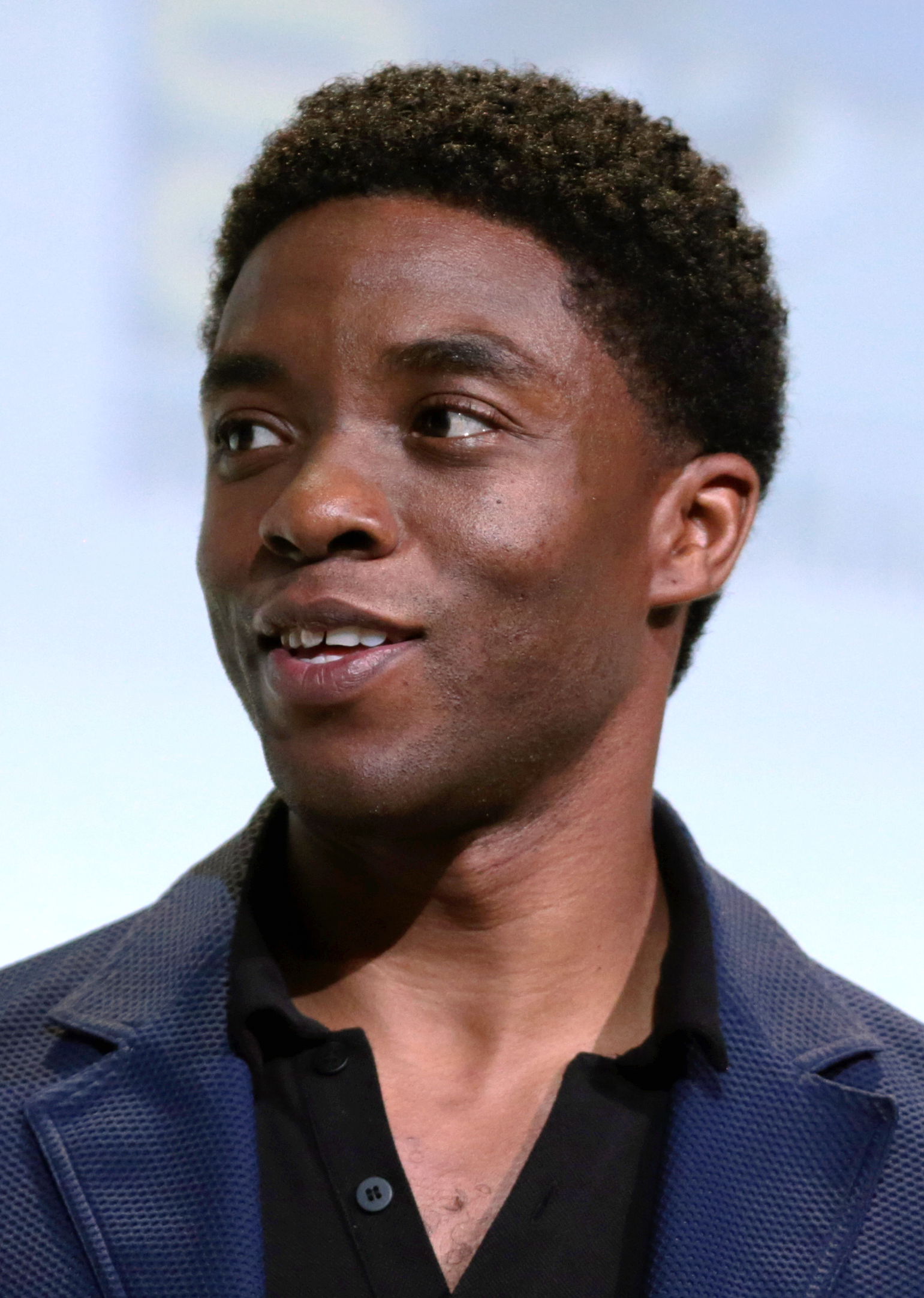
Chadwick Boseman, Actor of the Year winner

Frances McDormand, Actress of the Year winner

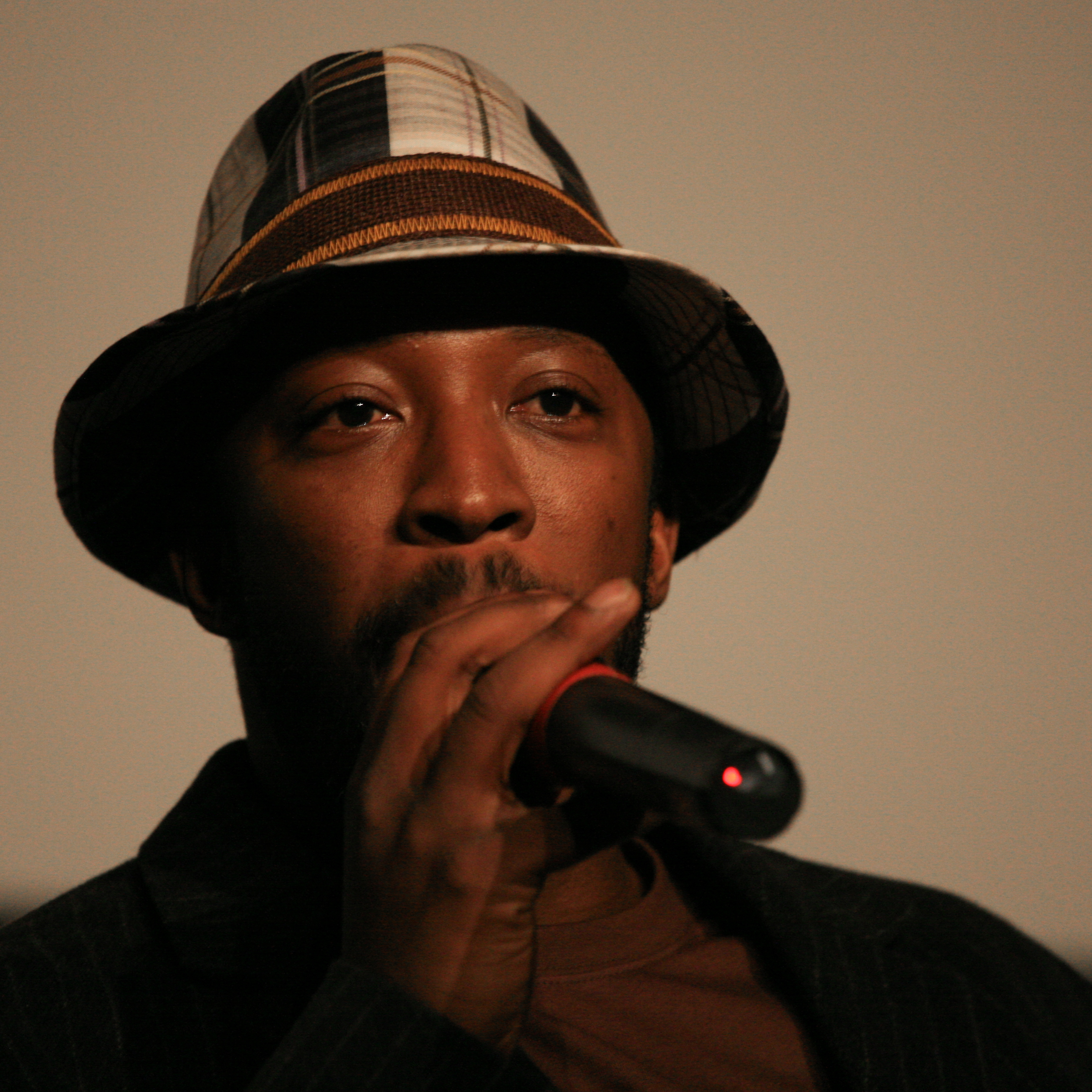
Shaun Parkes, Supporting Actor of the Year winner

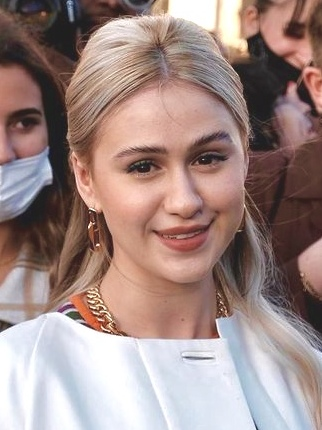
Maria Bakalova, Supporting Actress of the Year winner

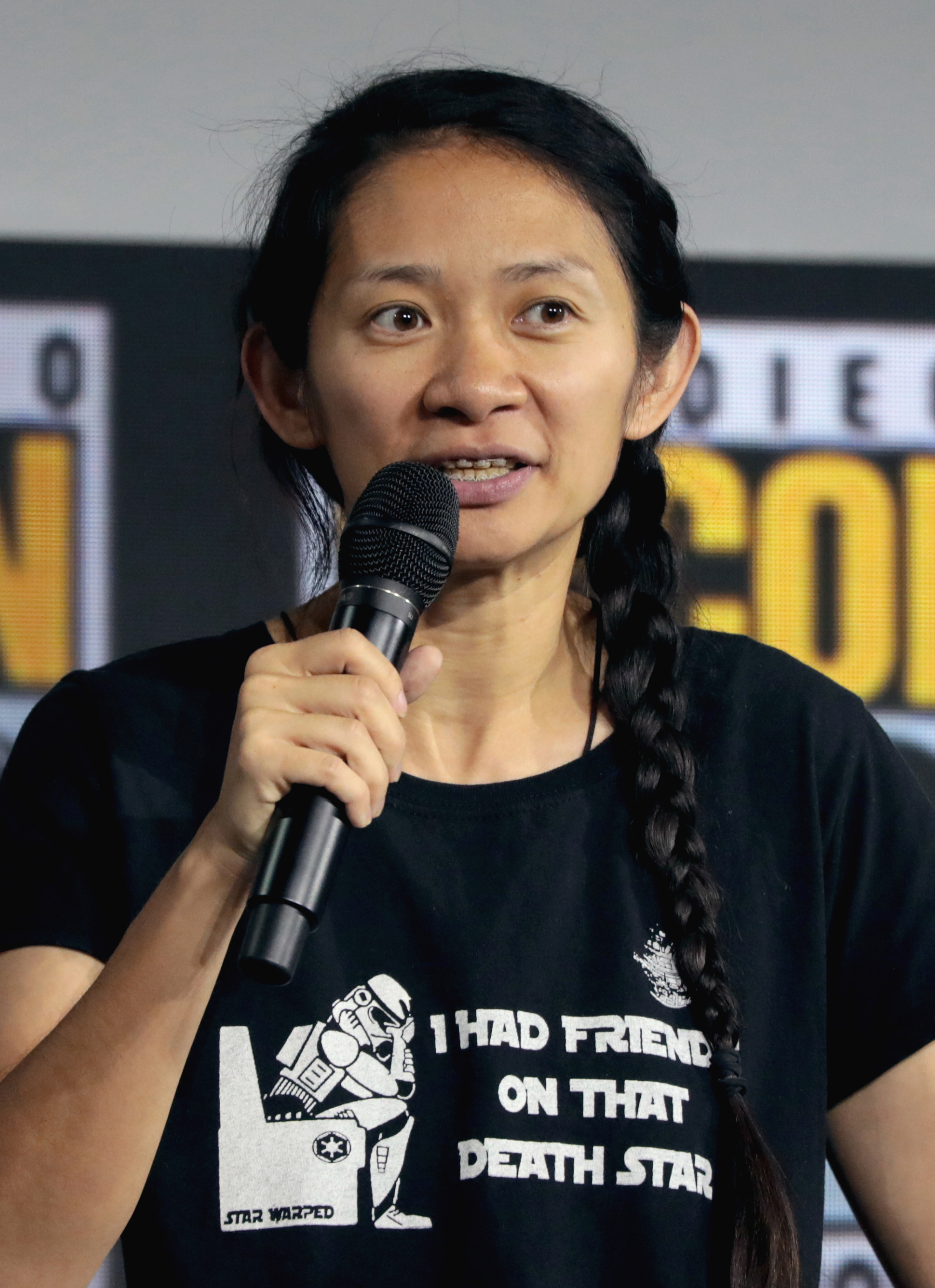
Chloé Zhao, Screenwriter of the Year winner

Winners are listed first and highlighted with boldface.

Film of the Year	Director of the Year
**Nomadland**; About Endlessness; Collective; I'm Thinking of Ending Things; Lovers Rock; The Mauritanian; Minari; Promising Young Woman; Rocks; Saint Maud	**Steve McQueen – Small Axe**; David Fincher – Mank; Rose Glass – Saint Maud; Kevin Macdonald – The Mauritanian; Chloé Zhao – Nomadland
Actor of the Year	Actress of the Year
**Chadwick Boseman – Ma Rainey's Black Bottom**; Riz Ahmed – Sound of Metal; Anthony Hopkins – The Father; Delroy Lindo – Da 5 Bloods; Tahar Rahim – The Mauritanian	**Frances McDormand – Nomadland**; Morfydd Clark – Saint Maud; Viola Davis – Ma Rainey's Black Bottom; Vanessa Kirby – Pieces of a Woman; Carey Mulligan – Promising Young Woman
Supporting Actor of the Year	Supporting Actress of the Year
**Shaun Parkes – Mangrove**; Sacha Baron Cohen – The Trial of the Chicago 7; Chadwick Boseman – Da 5 Bloods; Aldis Hodge – Clemency; Ben Mendelsohn – Babyteeth	**Maria Bakalova – Borat Subsequent Moviefilm**; Ellen Burstyn – Pieces of a Woman; Essie Davis – Babyteeth; Jennifer Ehle – Saint Maud; Amanda Seyfried – Mank
Screenwriter of the Year	Foreign Language Film of the Year
**Chloé Zhao – Nomadland**; Jack Fincher – Mank; Rose Glass – Saint Maud; Charlie Kaufman – I'm Thinking of Ending Things; Aaron Sorkin – The Trial of the Chicago 7	**Another Round**; About Endlessness; Collective; Les Misérables; Minari
Documentary of the Year	The Attenborough Award for British/Irish Film of the Year
**Collective**; Bloody Nose, Empty Pockets; Dick Johnson Is Dead; Time; The Truffle Hunters	**Saint Maud**; The Father; Lovers Rock; Mangrove; Rocks
British/Irish Actor of the Year	British/Irish Actress of the Year
**Riz Ahmed – Mogul Mowgli and Sound of Metal**; Sacha Baron Cohen – Borat Subsequent Moviefilm and The Trial of the Chicago 7; John Boyega – Red, White and Blue; Anthony Hopkins – The Father; Cosmo Jarvis – Calm with Horses and Nocturnal	**Morfydd Clark – Eternal Beauty and Saint Maud**; Bukky Bakray – Rocks; Jessie Buckley – I'm Thinking of Ending Things and Misbehaviour; Vanessa Kirby – Pieces of a Woman and The World to Come; Carey Mulligan – The Dig and Promising Young Woman
Young British/Irish Performer of the Year	The Philip French Award for Breakthrough British/Irish Filmmaker of the Year
**Bukky Bakray – Rocks**; Kosar Ali – Rocks; Millie Bobby Brown – Enola Holmes; Conrad Khan – County Lines; Molly Windsor – Make Up	**Rose Glass – Saint Maud**; Henry Blake – County Lines; Fyzal Boulifa – Lynn + Lucy; Emerald Fennell – Promising Young Woman; Remi Weekes – His House
British/Irish Short Film of the Year	Technical Achievement Award
**The Long Goodbye**; Filipiñana; Hungry Joe; Lizard; The Shift	**Lucy Pardee – Rocks, casting**; Nicolas Becker – Sound of Metal, sound design; Donald Graham Burt – Mank, production design; Deborah La Mia Denaver and Adruitha Lee – Birds of Prey, makeup & hair; Pete Docter – Soul, animation; Stéphane Fontaine – Ammonite, cinematography; Jennifer Lame – Tenet, film editing; Mica Levi – Lovers Rock, music; Tomm Moore and Ross Stewart – Wolfwalkers, animation; Joshua James Richards – Nomadland, cinematography
