= Tom Edge =

British screenwriter

- Occupation: Screenwriter
- Known for: Vigil; Lovesick

Tom Edge is a British screenwriter, best known for creating the submarine thriller Vigil.

== Career ==
Edge created and served as the lead writer on the sitcom Lovesick. The series focused on a group of English friends sharing a house in the West End of Glasgow and their romances. Lovesick began as a programme for Channel 4, before being acquired by Netflix. He also wrote on the second series of The Crown, as well as the second, third and fourth series of Strike. He wrote the 2019 biopic Judy, about the later life of Hollywood actress Judy Garland and her declining health. It starred, and later won an Academy Award for, Renée Zellweger.

According to a 2021 interview, Edge was approached by producer George Aza-Selinger to develop a submarine project. It became Vigil and, produced by World Productions, it began broadcasting on BBC One on 29 August 2021. Vigil became the BBC’s most watched new drama of the year, with its first episode attracting 10.2 million viewers across its first seven days. In 2022, BBC One aired Edge's crime miniseries, You Don't Know Me. It is based on the 2017 crime novel of the same name by Imran Mahmood.

== Filmography ==
=== Film ===
| Year | Title | Director |
|---|---|---|
| 2019 | Judy | Rupert Goold |

=== Television ===
| Year | Title | Notes |
|---|---|---|
| 2012 | Threesome | Two episodes |
| 2012–2014 | The Midnight Beast | Nine episodes |
| 2013 | Pramface | One episode |
| 2014–2018 | Lovesick | Also creator 22 episodes |
| 2016 | The Last Dragonslayer | TV movie Adapted from novel of the same name |
| 2016–2017 | The Crown | Five episodes |
| 2017–2026 | Strike | 12 episodes |
| 2021 | You Don't Know Me | Four episodes |
| 2021–2023 | Vigil | Also creator Nine episodes |
