= You Don't Know Me (TV series) =

2017 British television series

- Genre: Crime drama
- Based on: You Don't Know Me by Imran Mahmood
- Written by: Tom Edge
- Directed by: Sarmad Masud
- Starring: Samuel Adewunmi; Sophie Wilde
- Composer: Stephen Rennicks
- Country of origin: United Kingdom
- Original language: English
- No. of seasons: 1
- No. of episodes: 4

Production
- Executive producers: Ruth Kenley-Letts; Neil Blair; Jenny Van Der Lande; Kate Crowe; Lucy Richer
- Producers: Jules Hussey; Rienkje Attoh
- Production location: England
- Production company: Snowed-In Productions

Original release
- Network: BBC One
- Release: 5 December – 13 December 2021

You Don't Know Me is a British four-part crime drama television series. It is based on the 2017 crime novel of the same name by Imran Mahmood. The first episode premiered on BBC One on 5 December 2021, with the series available to stream on BBC iPlayer following broadcast. It had an international release on Netflix on 17 June 2022.

== Premise ==
On trial for killing a drug dealer, Hero (Adewunmi) tries to convince the court of his innocence. To do so, he provides context which ties into his tumultuous relationship with Kyra (Wilde) and how it led to the murder.

== Cast ==
- Samuel Adewunmi as Hero
- Sophie Wilde as Kyra
- Bukky Bakray as Bless
- Roger Nsengiyumva as Jamil
- Tuwaine Barrett as Curt
- Yetunde Oduwole as Adebi
- Nicholas Khan as Sam
- Michael Balogun as Face
- Duayne Boachie as Binks

== Episodes ==
No.	Title	Directed by	Written by	Original release date	U.K. viewers (millions)
1	"Episode 1"	Sarmad Masud	Tom Edge	5 December 2021	4.23
2	"Episode 2"	Sarmad Masud	Tom Edge	6 December 2021	3.46
3	"Episode 3"	Sarmad Masud	Tom Edge	12 December 2021	3.97
4	"Episode 4"	Sarmad Masud	Tom Edge	13 December 2021	3.62

== Production ==
=== Development ===
It was announced in February 2020 that Snowed-In Productions would adapt Mahmood's novel for the BBC with Tom Edge as writer and Sarmad Masud as director. Jules Hussey is series producer and Rienkje Attoh is producer. Set to executive produce are Kate Crowe and Lucy Richer of the BBC as well as Ruth Kenley-Letts, Neil Blair, and Jenny Van Der Lande.

=== Casting ===
Bukky Bakray joined the cast in March 2021.

=== Filming ===
Principal photography began in February 2021 in Birmingham.

== Release ==
First look images were revealed in May 2021. The BBC released a trailer on 16 November 2021.

== Reception ==
Ed Cumming from The Independent gave the first episode four out of five stars, commending the clever storytelling. Rebecca Nicholson of The Guardian awarded the first episode three stars out of five, praising the performances but criticizing the pacing and format.
