= Vigil (TV series) =

British police procedural television serial

- Genre: Police procedural
- Created by: Tom Edge
- Starring: Suranne Jones; Rose Leslie; Shaun Evans; Martin Compston; Paterson Joseph; Adam James; Gary Lewis; Lauren Lyle; Lolita Chakrabarti; Anjli Mohindra; Connor Swindells; Cal MacAninch; Lorne MacFadyen; Daniel Portman; Stephen Dillane; Stephen McCole; Dougray Scott; Romola Garai
- Music by: Glenn Gregory; Berenice Scott
- Opening theme: Fuel to Fire by Agnes Obel
- Country of origin: United Kingdom
- Original language: English
- No. of series: 3
- No. of episodes: 18

Production
- Executive producers: Gaynor Holmes; Tom Edge; Jake Lushington; James Strong; Simon Heath
- Producer: Angie Daniell
- Production company: World Productions

Original release
- Network: BBC One
- Release: 29 August 2021 – present

Vigil is a British police procedural drama television series created by Tom Edge and produced by World Productions. The series premiered on BBC One on 29 August 2021. The first series comprises 6 episodes and stars Suranne Jones, Rose Leslie, Shaun Evans, Paterson Joseph, Gary Lewis and Martin Compston, and is set in Scotland and in the ocean adjacent to Scotland, primarily onboard HMS Vigil, a ballistic missile submarine of the Royal Navy.

The second series, again with 6 episodes, premiered on 10 December 2023. It replaces the nautical setting of the first series with a land-based drama that focuses on prototype drone technology. Jones, Leslie and Lewis reprise their roles, with Dougray Scott and Romola Garai joining the main cast.

In February 2025, it was renewed for a third series, also of 6 episodes, to be set in an Arctic research station on Svalbard. Filming began in September 2025, and the series premiered on 30 August 2026.

== Plot ==
=== Series 1 ===
Detective Chief Inspector Amy Silva of Police Scotland is sent to HMS Vigil, a nuclear-powered Vanguard-class ballistic missile submarine, to investigate a death on board, which takes place shortly after the mysterious disappearance of a Scottish fishing trawler. Her investigations, and those of her colleagues ashore, bring the police into conflict with the Royal Navy and MI5, the British Security Service.

The loss of the trawler Mhairi Finnea in the series bears similarities to the sinking of the FV Antares by Royal Navy nuclear-powered submarine HMS Trenchant in the Firth of Clyde in 1990. Families of the Antares's crew expressed upset at scenes of the Mhairi Finnea foundering; however, the BBC denied that the drama was inspired by or based on a specific real-life event.

=== Series 2 ===
When a Royal Air Force prototype combat drone is compromised and kills several soldiers during a joint demonstration in Scotland, Silva's team are tasked with finding the perpetrator. She travels to joint Al-Shawka Air Base in the Kingdom of Wudyan, a controversial ally in the Persian Gulf, and discovers a wider conspiracy intertwined with the current regime's collaboration with the British government and private enterprise on drone development.

=== Series 3 ===
The third series is set at an Arctic research station in Svalbard where Silva and Longacre investigate the death of a British special forces officer involved in a covert mission. As well as fight for control of Arctic resources as the ice melts, against the backdrop of strained relations between Russia and the West following its Russo-Ukrainian war and break up the NATO alliance.

== Cast and characters ==
=== Main ===
- Suranne Jones as Detective Chief Inspector Amy Silva
- Rose Leslie as Detective Sergeant/Inspector Kirsten Longacre
- Gary Lewis as Detective Superintendent/Chief Superintendent Colin Robertson
- Orla Russell as Poppy Torrens, Silva's adopted daughter from a previous relationship

=== Recurring ===
==== Series 1 ====
- Shaun Evans as Warrant Officer Class One Elliot Glover, the coxswain of HMS Vigil
- Martin Compston as Chief Petty Officer Craig Burke, a sonar mapping expert on HMS Vigil
- Paterson Joseph as Commander Neil Newsome, the Captain of HMS Vigil
- Adam James as Lieutenant Commander Mark Prentice, the Executive Officer of HMS Vigil
- Lauren Lyle as Jade Antoniak, a peace activist
- Therese Bradley as Laura Michaels, an MI5 officer
- Parth Thakerar as Jay Kohli, an MI5 officer
- Stephen Dillane as Rear Admiral Shaw, Head of the Royal Navy Submarine Service
- Lolita Chakrabarti as Lieutenant Commander Erin Branning, Shaw's aide
- Dan Li as Lieutenant Commander Hennessy, the Weapons Engineer Officer on HMS Vigil
- Lorne MacFadyen as Chief Petty Officer Matthew Doward, a sonar mapping expert transferred from HMS Virtue
- Connor Swindells as Lieutenant Simon Hadlow, an engineering officer on HMS Vigil
- Lois Chimimba as Chief Petty Officer Tara Kierly, a sonar mapping expert of HMS Vigil
- Daniel Portman as Chief Petty Officer Gary Walsh, an engineer on HMS Vigil
- Anjli Mohindra as Surgeon Lieutenant Tiffany Docherty, the medical officer on HMS Vigil
- Anita Vettesse as Petty Officer Jackie Hamilton, chef on HMS Vigil
- Reuben Joseph as Detective Sergeant Porter
- Cal MacAninch as Ben Oakley, peace activist
- Tom Gill as Petty Officer Adams

==== Series 2 ====
- Dougray Scott as Air Vice Marshal Marcus Grainger, a senior officer in charge of the R-PAS drone project
- Romola Garai as Acting Squadron Leader Eliza Russell, interim leader of British forces stationed at Al-Shawka Air Base
- Chris Jenks as Flight Lieutenant Callum Barker, a drone pilot stationed in Wudyan
- Anders Hayward as Flying Officer Colin Dixon, a drone pilot stationed in Dundair
- Shannon Hayes as Flight Lieutenant Nicole Lawson, a drone pilot stationed in Wudyan
- David Elliot as Ross Sutherland, a disturbed ex-soldier
- Oscar Salem as Captain Sattam Abdul "Sam" Kader, a Royal Wudyani Air Force drone pilot
- Nebras Jamali as Colonel Ali Bilali, commander of Al-Shawka Air Base in Wudyan
- Amir El-Masry as Daniel Ramsey, an MI5 officer
- Noof Ousellam as Paul Townsend, Silva and Longacre's junior police colleague
- Steven Elder as Derek McCabe, Senior Vice President of Alban-X, the Scottish manufacturer of R-PAS drones
- Jonathan Ajayi as Wes Harper, an American citizen employed as chief software engineer at Al-Shawka Air Base
- Alastair MacKenzie as Wing Commander Anthony Chapman, former leader of British forces stationed at Al-Shawka Air Base
- Hiba Medina as Sabiha Chapman, Anthony's daughter
- Dominic Mafham as Sir Ian Downing, Ramsay's superior in MI5
- Tommy Sim'aan as Firas Zaman, a Wudyani journalist and dissident living in Scotland
- Khalid Laith Nicole as Abdullah Ghazali, leader of Jabhat Al-huriyya
- Kamal Mustaffai as Mutaz, one of Ghazali's henchmen

==== Series 3 ====
- Jeppe Beck Laursen as Henrik Becken, the Governor of Svalbard and local Chief of Police
- Naomi Yang as Shen Jia, a Chinese microbiologist working on Svalbard
- Tornike Gogrichiani as Colonel Fyodor Zamorin, a Russian Police official sent to Svalbard
- Steven Miller as Sergeant Mark Cunningham, a Royal Navy Special Boat Service soldier
- Benjamin Wainwright as Captain Oli Pickford, leader of the Royal Navy Special Boat Service team on Svalbard
- Jordan Duvigneau as Simon Anderson, the sniper in the Royal Navy Special Boat Service team on Svalbard
- Conor Berry as Daniel Hodge, a Royal Navy Special Boat Service soldier
- Danusia Samal as Jasmin Kelly, an MI5 official working with Downing
- Eric Godon as Yakov Korotayev, the mayor of Baltegrad, a Russian town and enclave in Svalbard
- Amy Manson as Lorna McCallister, a geologist on Svalbard
- Steven Cree as Gordon Laity, the Minister of State for Energy and Green Transition
- Derek Riddell as Professor Vincent Mair, an environmental scientist and adviser to the Department of Energy
- Killian Coyle as Jason Collyer, an environmental activist
- Jason Tobin as Huang Chen, Shen's colleague and fellow Chinese microbiologist
- Artur Zai Barrera as James Garcia, an American lab technician working on Svalbard
- Shereen Cutkelvin as Holly Mitchell, a DS working with Amy and the team at their Scottish base
- Dawn Sievewright as Chloe Ackroyd, Collyer's girlfriend
- Alma Prelec as Polina Kurkova, a Russian citizen living in Baltegrad
- James Sobol Kelly as Teddy Ward, the US representative at the climate change conference in Glasgow
- Tom Wu as Xi Jing, the Chinese representative at the climate change conference in Glasgow

== Episodes ==
Series	Episodes	Originally released		Average UK viewers (millions)
Series	Episodes	First released	Last released	Average UK viewers (millions)
1	6	29 August 2021	26 September 2021	9.64
2	6	10 December 2023	19 December 2023	5.50
3	6	30 August 2026	14 September 2026	TBA

=== Series 1 (2021) ===
No.	Title	Directed by	Written by	Original release date	UK viewers (millions) 7 day	UK viewers (millions) 28 day
1	"Episode 1"	James Strong	Tom Edge	29 August 2021	9.96	12.75 (Note: In an October 2021 press release, the BBC claimed 13.8 million viewers for Series 1 Episode 1, citing BARB 28 day consolidated data as the source. BARB 28 day consolidated data is not directly available to the public.)
Chief Petty Officer Craig Burke, a member of the crew of a ballistic missile nuclear submarine HMS Vigil, reports his concerns over unusual sonar readings while on patrol. Confined to quarters following insubordination, he is later found dead in an apparent drug overdose. Police Scotland are asked to investigate and DCI Amy Silva and a man called Doward, Burke's replacement on the crew, are airlifted to Vigil's classified location. Unable to contact her colleagues by radio due to the sensitive nature of the patrol mission, she suspects the sailor was murdered, but the captain and other officers disagree. On land, Silva's DS and former lover, Kirsten Longacre, has begun a parallel investigation into Burke's movements and his acquaintances. She finds a clue during a search of Burke's room which she keeps hidden from the Navy. Vigil loses power suddenly when the reactor SCRAMs and the boat lurches in an uncontrollable dive.
2	"Episode 2"	James Strong	Tom Edge	30 August 2021	8.80	11.81
The crew rush to restart the reactor and restore power. DCI Silva finds evidence to support her murder theory, but encounters resentment from most of the crew, apart from the coxswain Elliot Glover, in whom she confides the reason for her claustrophobia and fear of being underwater. Silva is also haunted by memories about the death of her fiancé during a car accident and having to make the difficult choice to save their daughter Poppy. After locking her in her cabin, Lieutenant Commander Mark Prentice, the Executive Officer, admits to striking Burke and concealing this when Burke was found dead in his bunk. Silva doubts the blow was fatal and thinks Burke may have been poisoned. DS Longacre is attacked when she arrives home to find two burglars ransacking her house. She makes contact with a young anti-nuclear weapons activist, Jade, who had been dating Burke and agrees to talk to her. On arriving at the rendezvous, she discovers that Jade has drowned.
3	"Episode 3"	James Strong	Ed Macdonald	5 September 2021	9.43	12.48
The police find that Burke held compromising material on the crew following a mission to Florida where two US contractors died; his findings include a compromising photo of medical officer Docherty with an unknown tattooed man. On land, the news of Burke’s death is leaked to the media. Longacre learns that Jade was the daughter of Scottish MP Patrick Cruden, who also reveals that Burke shared incriminating information through Jade. The missing fishing trawler is revealed to have been dragged down by an American submarine, raising questions as to why it was in British waters. The Navy believe that the Americans were still uneasy following the Florida incident. On board the Vigil, CPO Gary Walsh gets drunk, steals a gun and attempts suicide, but is stopped by Silva and Glover. Longacre is tracked down by MI5 officers and questioned about her investigation. Silva identifies Glover as the tattooed man.
4	"Episode 4"	Isabelle Sieb	Chandni Lakhani	12 September 2021	9.28	11.88
MI5 reveal to the police that the suspected murderer of Jade was a Russian GRU spy with diplomatic immunity. The police, MI5 and the navy present their findings to the Secretary of State for Defence, and speculate that there may be a Russian spy on board the Vigil. Shaw reluctantly makes the decision to recall the submarine, but there is no response because Vigil's communications are down as a result of sabotage. On Vigil, suspicion falls on the chief cook, Jackie Hamilton, whose son was imprisoned in Indonesia on drug charges, which have suddenly been dropped. Hamilton is later found dead by Silva and Silva is attacked by an unknown assailant wearing a mask.
5	"Episode 5"	Isabelle Sieb	Tom Edge	19 September 2021	9.78	12.07
The masked man turns out to be Glover, who is trying to save Silva from a nerve agent which he thinks killed Jackie Hamilton and which continues to be present in a key part of the submarine. Silva and Longacre's past relationship continues to be told in flashbacks. Longacre visits Silva's deceased boyfriend's daughter Poppy and her grandparents. Working with MI5, Longacre and DS Porter continue their investigation into Russian espionage. Ben Oakley from the peace camp is revealed to have been abetting the Russians; posing as a whistleblower on Britain's nuclear activities, he persuades Patrick Cruden, the Scottish MP and Jade Antoniak's natural father, to arrange political asylum for him at a foreign embassy. Longacre identifies Doward, the sonar operator who replaced Burke, as a probable Russian agent. Glover and Silva don protective gear in a dangerous assignment to examine Jackie Hamilton's body and the surrounding sealed-off area to investigate her death and make the area safe from further contamination. When Silva returns, she is overpowered by Doward, who traps her in one of the torpedo tubes and starts to fill it with seawater.
6	"Episode 6"	Isabelle Sieb	Tom Edge	26 September 2021	10.63	12.08
Prentice rescues Silva from the torpedo compartment but is murdered by Doward, who also sabotages the submarine’s valves so that it begins to take in water. Walsh and other maintenance personnel manage to stop the leak and get communications back on, and Captain Newsome receives orders from the Admiralty and the information about Doward. Silva is taken hostage by Doward in an effort to force Newsome to resurface and contact a Russian vessel. Newsome has the submarine tilt rapidly upward, throwing Doward off balance; he is overpowered by other crew members and is arrested by Silva. Longacre and her team arrest Oakley outside the Chinese consulate, and he confesses that he was an accessory to Jade's murder. Silva returns to dry land and rekindles her relationship with Longacre, and they visit Poppy. Doward is interviewed by MI5, and reveals to them that the plan was meant to discredit Britain’s Trident nuclear deterrent, at a time when Parliament was to vote on whether to retain Trident. Shaw persuades Cruden to go along with the official story that the sinking of the fishing trawler was caused by a Russian submarine.

=== Series 2 (2023) ===
No. overall	No. in series	Title	Directed by	Written by	Original release date	UK viewers (millions) 7 day	UK viewers (millions) 28 day
7	1	"Episode 1"	Andy De Emmony	Tom Edge	10 December 2023	5.96	TBA
DCI Silva and DS Longacre continue their relationship, with the latter pregnant. The couple investigate a botched drone demonstration drill at the Dundair Air Weapons Range in Scotland, which ended with the deaths of several British military personnel and delegates from Wudyan, an authoritarian Middle Eastern monarchy. A drone controller is suspected of piloting the rogue drones but the detectives suspect a bigger conspiracy. Air Vice-Marshal Marcus Grainger is involved in a lucrative partnership to export military drones to Wudyan amidst human rights concerns. Longacre detains Firas, a dissident Wudyan journalist who was spying on the test demonstration. While searching for missing Royal Air Force officer Anthony Chapman and his daughter Sabiha, Silva and Longacre discover that an assassin has killed Chapman but find Sabiha.
8	2	"Episode 2"	Andy De Emmony	Tom Edge	11 December 2023	5.83	TBA
With the help of armed police, Silva and Longacre save Sabiha from the assassin but are unable to stop him from fleeing. The detectives' investigation leads Silva to travel to Wudyan where British military personnel led by Squadron Leader Eliza Russell conduct joint military and training operations with Wudyan military forces. Silva travels with Sabiha, who is of mixed Wudyan-British origins. Longacre remains in Scotland to continue the investigation there. She encounters the assassin Ross Sutherland in an abandoned apartment complex but allows him to escape. In Wudyan, Silva learns that a reserve RPAS console was stolen and CCTV footage removed to cover the theft. Her investigation is further complicated when Sabiha stabs Callum Barker, a lieutenant who was one of Chapman's colleagues.
9	3	"Episode 3"	Joss Agnew	James Smythe	12 December 2023	5.43	TBA
In Wudyan, Silva manages to convince Sabiha not to kill Barker and to surrender. In custody, Sabiha admits to stealing a drone console from the base as part of a Wudyan dissident movement. Sabiha reveals that she and her father Chapman had been concerned about Wudyan's human rights abuses. Silva manages to convince the Wudyan and British authorities to allow Sabiha to return to the United Kingdom to face trial. After questioning Barker, Silva searches for a traitor within the base, who organised the theft of the drone console. As part of her investigation, Silva questions a wealthy Wudyan man, who proves uncooperative. While driving with Russell, the two women are held at gunpoint by a Wudyan man. Back in Scotland, Longacre learns from Daniel Ramsay that Barker had run a social media account documenting human rights abuses in Wudyan. Following an argument with Silva, Longacre encounters Sutherland, who reveals details of the drone plot. Later, she leads a successful manhunt that captures Sutherland.
10	4	"Episode 4"	Andy De Emmony	Maryam Hamidi	17 December 2023	5.12	TBA
Silva and Russell are kidnapped by a group of Wudyan political dissidents, who are opposed to the ruling regime's military partnership with the United Kingdom. Back in Scotland, Longacre and Ramsay question the Wudyan dissident for information about Silva and Russell's whereabouts. The dissident's brother is revealed to be the leader of the group holding Silva and Russell hostage. Captain Kader, a secret Wudyan dissident, infiltrates the base using Russell's access codes but is captured before he can complete his mission to obtain classified information. Lieutenant Barker obtains the flashdrive containing the information. Silva and Russell escape their captors and managed to contact British and Wudyan forces before their recapture. The two are liberated by British and Wudyan forces, who kill most of the dissidents.
11	5	"Episode 5"	Andy De Emmony	Ryan O'Sullivan & Matilda Wnek	18 December 2023	5.36	TBA
Following their rescue, Silva clashes with Air Vice-Marshal Grainger and Squadron Leader Russell about the heavy-handed killing of the dissidents. Captain Kader is arrested by Wudyan authorities, who regard him as a terrorist. Despite Grainger's orders that she return to Scotland, Silva continues her investigation in Wudyan. Barker provides Silva with the flashdrive, which contains footage of the failed drone demonstration. Silva also discovers evidence that the stolen drone console was planted in the Wudyan dissident hideout with the intention of framing them for the drone rampage. Silva also pursues technician Wes Harper, who has access to information about the drone programme. After escaping assassins, Silva and Harper depart Wudyan with Russell on an Air Force transport plane. During the flight, Harper is killed by Russell seemingly in self defence. Elsewhere, Sutherland escapes the hospital.
12	6	"Episode 6"	Joss Agnew	Tom Edge	19 December 2023	5.35	TBA
Returning to Scotland, Silva and police investigators discover evidence that Russell murdered Harper. Before they can question Russell, she is whisked into hiding by MI5. Meanwhile, Longacre tracks down Sutherland, who is meeting with the arms dealer McCabe. McCabe kills Sutherland and shoots Longacre, wounding her. After tending to Longacre, Silva locates Russell, who confesses to manipulating Sabiha into stealing the drone console, hiring Sutherland to kill Chapman for looking for the missing console, and murdering Harper for blackmailing her. Russell also reveals that she and Grainger staged the Dundair drone attack as a false flag operation for the UK to enter Wudyan's war against the Jabat Al-Huria insurgents. With Ramsay's help, Silva uncovers evidence incriminating Grainger. Grainger and Russell are subsequently convicted of the Dundair murders and conspiracy and sentenced to life imprisonment. Firas delivers a victim impact statement criticising the British support for Wudyan's repressive government. Captain Kader has his sentence commuted to two years. Silva, Longacre and Poppy celebrate the impending birth of Longacre's son.

=== Series 3 (2026) ===
No. overall	No. in series	Title	Directed by	Written by	Original release date	UK viewers (millions) 7 day	UK viewers (millions) 28 day
13	1	"Episode 1"	Gareth Bryn	Tom Edge	30 August 2026	N/A	TBA
In Svalbard, the attempted extraction of Chinese microbiologist Shen Jia by a British SBS team results in a gunfight with Russian soldiers. Jia runs away in the chaos. The body of operator Daniel Hodge is later found in Baltegrad, the Russian enclave. MI5 approach Police Scotland, explaining that soldiers are present (in violation of the Svalbard Treaty) as protection for a Department of Energy sea bed mining project. Jia had been offered asylum for data she obtained relating to national security. As Hodge was using civilian cover, Longacre is enlisted to ostensibly assist the civilian police investigation, passing intel back to MI5. Henrick Becken, the Governor and police chief, explains the tense diplomatic circumstances. Vincent Mair, a government scientist who left Svalbard a day early, is killed in a lab explosion when Silva tries to question him. The Russians, joined by police Colonel Fyodor Zamorin, claim Hodge was shot after he shot two people, but refuse to release his body. Becken, Longacre and Zamorin find evidence that Hodge was murdered in Jia’s room, believing someone is trying to push Russia into conflict with NATO. After being questioned by Silva about Mair’s death, Energy Minister Gordon Laity is kidnapped by eco-activist Jason Collyer.
14	2	"Episode 2"	Gareth Bryn	Tom Edge & Polly Buckle	31 August 2026	N/A	TBA
Becken, Longacre and Zamorin suspect Jia and an accomplice killed Hodge, and search for her. Baltegrad mayor Korotayev offers to release Hodge’s body, allowing the UK to cover up its treaty violations, in exchange for Jia when she is found. With help from Zamorin, Longacre discovers Hodges’s SBS colleague Mark Cunningham, still undercover with his superior Oli Pickford as prospectors, was in a relationship with Jia and had urged her to hide. Cunningham denies killing Hodge, and defends his actions claiming he couldn’t trust anyone after realising the extraction had been compromised. Silva discovers that Mair withdrew support for the project after reviewing the EIA on Svalbard. She follows Collyer’s girlfriend Chloe Ackroyd to where Laity is being held, but is also taken hostage. Threatened at gunpoint by Collyer, Laity confesses that the government is proceeding with the mining project regardless of the EIA, forced the previous geologist into a NDA, and hired a new one to fake the data. Chloe is revealed to have manufactured the bomb that killed Mair, but is shot by AFO’s when she aims a gun at Collyer. Polina Kurkova, a Russian from Baltegrad who approaches Longacre offering to defect in exchange for evidence, is stabbed to death in the Science Institute.
15	3	"Episode 3"	Gareth Bryn	Tom Edge & Tom Mair	6 September 2026	N/A	TBA
The Russians suspect Longacre of killing Polina. Arriving in Svalbard, Silva is warned by Becken that if they don’t find the killer, Oslo is willing to scapegoat Longacre to keep the peace. It is agreed a joint investigation led by Zamorin will be conducted. Longacre speaks with Lorna McCallister, the geologist hired to alter the EIA, and discovers Jia’s work on cyanobacteria was funded by the PLA. They find evidence Hodge may have been spying for the FSB, and that Polina was not defecting, but trying to get to the lab. During a power cut, Korotayev’s men break into the lab to try and steal one of Jia’s samples. The SBS team intercepts them, but Silva diffuses the standoff by showing that Jia already removed the sample before disappearing. The power cut was a ruse by McCallister, allowing her to destroy Jia’s remaining research. She says she killed Polina in self defence in a struggle over accessing the lab, but later tells Longacre that Jia didn’t want anyone recreating the potential bioweapon she had discovered. Longacre convinces Lorna to reveal Jia's location and departs with Becken to retrieve her. However, Zamorin informs Silva he has traced the FSB phone used by Hodge to Becken’s office, suggesting Becken killed him after discovering he was a spy.
16	4	"Episode 4"	Faye Gilbert	Tom Edge & Eve Hedderwick Turner	7 September 2026	N/A	TBA
Silva tries to have technicians at the Science Institute access Hodge’s FSB phone, but it is wiped by malware. Believing Zamorin has sabotaged evidence, Silva evades him and follows Longacre and Becken after getting Jia’s location from Lorna. Becken and Longacre find Jia with her sample intact, but he knocks Longacre down and escapes with Jia as prisoner just as Silva arrives, also sabotaging their ATV’s. The two take shelter in a Satellite Station, and reconcile issues with their romantic and professional relationship. Pickford orders Cunningham to not follow Silva and lead the Russians to Jia, and instead wait until she calls it in officially before intercepting. However, Zamorin blackmails Cunningham with footage of the ambush to help find Jia, offering her freedom in exchange for the sample. Silva finds a flare gun in the station, which draws Cunningham and Zamorin to them. Zamorin theorises Becken is helping China regain control of Jia and the sample after her attempted defection to the UK. He, Cunningham, Silva and Longacre intercept Becken at Svalbard Airport, but Becken is injured by a sniper and the sample breaks during the scuffle. As Cunningham returns fire, a distraught Jia tells Silva her research was never a weapon, but instead the “answer to everything”.
17	5	"Episode 5"	Faye Gilbert	Tom Edge & Tom Mair	13 September 2026	N/A	TBA
The group flees the airfield, taking refuge in an empty cabin. Jia says her discovery was a viable carbon neutral replacement for gasoline, and believes she is being targeted by China to keep it secret. She also gave a sample to Mair, and blames herself for his death. They are helped by Garcia, the Science Institute administrator and a deep cover CIA agent. He identifies the sniper as Pickford, believed to be working with Jia’s colleague Chen. Jia insists on retrieving digital copies of her work, which Lorna failed to delete, from the lab. Chen admits paying Becken to kidnap Jia on behalf of the CCP, but realising they now want to kill instead of repatriate her, helps her retrieve the data. After a confrontation with Pickford, Longacre deduces Garcia lied and is the sniper, intercepting him just as he attacks Silva and Jia. Garcia is arrested, but justifies his actions against Jia, arguing the biofuel would collapse economies of oil rich countries and cause global chaos, to the USA’s detriment. Zamorin finds evidence that Korotayev was working with Garcia and informs Longacre, with both deducing he is in fact a Russian spy and framed Hodge before killing him. Jia, Silva and Cunningham are extracted by helicopter to Scotland, but are attacked en route to debrief with Downing.
18	6	"Episode 6"	Gareth Bryn	Tom Edge	14 September 2026	N/A	TBA
Cunningham holds off the attackers, working for the Americans, allowing Silva and Jia to escape. At the COP 31 in Glasgow, China threatens to stop sale of rare earth metals to the UK, knowing the sea bed mining project won’t be operational for another decade, unless Jia is returned. Downing is forced to acquiesce by the Home Secretary, but Silva refuses to hand Jia over. They discover the sample given to Mair survived the explosion and has been stolen by Laity. Longacre speaks with a recovered Chloe, who reveals she is an MI5 asset. Longacre foils an assassination attempt by her handler, and discovers MI5 allowed the Chinese to plant the bomb that killed Mair. With help from Cunningham, Silva and Jia break into a government laboratory to retrieve the sample. They narrowly escape the Americans, now working with MI5 following an agreement for the USA to invest in the sea bed mining project. However, Jia is intercepted by Downing. Silva and Longacre save her and arrest him with the help of his deputy, Jasmin Kelly, disgusted by his illegal actions ostensibly done to help the UK reach energy autonomy. Laity is also arrested, allowing Jia to release her work into the public domain at COP 31. Robertson allows Silva to resign to avoid being charged for her actions.

== Production ==
In a 2021 interview, writer Tom Edge was approached by development producer George Aza-Selinger to develop a submarine project for television. It was inspired by the UK's Continuous At-Sea Deterrent (CASD) and the life of its submarine crews. The show was filmed and primarily set in Scotland. Production designer Tom Sayer created elaborate studio sets to represent the interior of the submarine.

In March 2022, Vigil was renewed for a second series, which premiered on 10 December 2023. Filming for series 2 took place during spring 2023, across Scotland, in locations including Glasgow, Coatbridge, Motherwell, Cumbernauld, Luss, Lanark, Blantyre and North Ayrshire. Scenes were filmed in Casablanca and Rabat in Morocco to portray the country of Wudyan.

In February 2025, Vigil was renewed for a third series. Filming of Series 3 began in Svalbard in September 2025, featuring a majority new cast.

=== Music ===
The programme's theme music is the song "Fuel to Fire" from the 2013 album Aventine by Danish singer, songwriter and musician Agnes Obel. Other music included in the series is composed by Afterhere (Berenice Scott and Glenn Gregory). Episode 4 of Series 1 includes the song "Anchor" by Welsh singer, songwriter and multi-instrumentalist Novo Amor, released as a single in 2015 and included on his 2017 EP Bathing Beach.

== Broadcast ==
Series 1 premiered on BBC One on 29 August 2021.

== Reception ==
=== Ratings ===
Series 1 Episode 1 attracted an audience of 10.2 million viewers across its first seven days, making Vigil the BBC's most watched new drama of the year.

=== Series 1 ===
The first series received generally positive reviews from critics, with praise for the writing, pace, acting, visual style, set design, tone, and atmosphere, but was criticised for the dialogue, plot, and inaccuracies. The review aggregator Rotten Tomatoes gave the first series an 85% approval rating, with an average rating of 6.6/10, based on 20 reviews. The critical consensus reads, "Vigil is ludicrous just as often as it is suspenseful, but a committed cast and pulpy pace make it worth diving in". On Metacritic, the series has a weighted average score of 83 out of 100 based on five reviews.

Lucy Mangan of The Guardian found the first episode intriguing, awarding it five out of five and describing it as "solid, old-fashioned entertainment". The Independent gave the first episode four out of five, praising the cast and Edge's writing. In a four-starred review for London's Evening Standard, Katie Rosseinsky said: "Even scenes set in the depths of the sub are visually striking, lit up in reds and blues. Add in some jump scares, a handful of near-catastrophes and a couple of cliffhangers and you have all the makings of a taut mystery with intriguingly murky depths. Sunday nights are stressful again – I wouldn’t have it any other way." In a five-starred review, Empire magazine described Vigil as "[a] relentless conspiracy drama bursting with performers who know how to keep their cards close to their chests. British TV doesn’t get more thrilling than this." Hugo Rifkind in The Times described "[s]etting a whodunnit on a submarine" as "a masterstroke". Giving the programme four stars, Suzy Feay of the Financial Times said that "The submarine setting has the welcome effect of pressure-cooking some fairly standard ingredients into a tasty concoction".

Other reviewers were less complimentary, citing the unrealistic sets and other technical inaccuracies, the implausibility of elements of the plot, and its political bias. James Delingpole in The Spectator described it as "amateurish and implausible", noting that "the uniforms are wrong; the ceilings are too high and the sub generally far too spacious" and criticised "the hackneyed dialogue, the implausible plotting and the box-ticking". Anita Singh in The Telegraph described the series as "so bad it could be Russian propaganda", and her colleague Ed Power noted that "the story was nonsense" and that "the premise was wasted". The Telegraph also reported that the naval advisor working on the series was an SNP councillor and anti-nuclear campaigner, leading to accusations of bias. Carol Midgley in The Times said that "this subpar ocean drama made my heart sink", and described it as "stultifying".

Swedish newspaper Aftonbladet said the series was "effective" in the beginning but more and more became like an "unnecessary under-water version of Line of Duty".

=== Series 2 ===
The review aggregator Rotten Tomatoes gave the second series a 58% approval rating, based on 12 reviews. The critic consensus read, "Taking Vigil out of its original submarine relieves the cabin pressure but also much of the suspense, although Suranne Jones and Rose Leslie's rapport still provides intrigue." Jack Seale of The Guardian awarded it four out of five, describing a "pacy, extremely good crime drama tackling murder on a military base" that was full of "political truth bombs". He also praised Jones's performance. Rebecca Cook of Digital Spy regarded the series as inferior to the first, because it lacked the same intrigue and settled "for something which feels far more ripped from the headlines". Cook, however, praised the second series for exploring the romantic human drama between Jones and Leslie.

Paul Stacey of the Irish Independent gave the series a critical review, describing it as a "daft and implausible cop thriller" with an "unlikeable lead". Stacey criticised Jones's performance as Silva as "drab... with little colour or depth". GQ pointed out serious flaws in the realism of the drones, but praised the imaginative way that the programme represented multiple drone technologies in one rather fantastical concept for dramatic effect.

=== Accolades ===
Year	Award	Category	Nominee(s)	Result	Ref.
2022	GLAAD Media Awards	Outstanding Limited or Anthology Series	Vigil	Nominated	
2022	British Academy Television Awards	Drama Series	Vigil	Nominated	
2022	International Emmy Awards	Best Drama Series	Vigil	Won	

== International distribution ==
Peacock acquired the show, and the first series was released in the United States on 19 December 2021. The second series was released on Peacock on 15 February 2024.

== See also ==
- Vanguard-class submarine
- Women on submarines
