= Ella Greenwood =

English actress, writer and director

- Born: Ella Mae Greenwood; 30 April 2001 (age 25); Enfield Town, Greater London, England
- Occupations: Filmmaker, actress, writer, mental health activist
- Years active: 2019-present
- Agent: CSP Management

Ella Mae Greenwood (born 30 April 2001) is an English filmmaker, actress, writer, and activist. An ambassador for Stem4, she is the director of the mental health-focused company Broken Flames Productions. She earned critical acclaim for her short film Faulty Roots. She appeared on the 2021 Forbes 30 Under 30 list.

== Early life ==
Greenwood was born and raised in North London, and was homeschooled from the age of 13. She received acting training at the National Youth Theatre.

== Career ==
Greenwood began acting at a young age, signing with an agent as a child. She was the lead character in the films Before Nightfall and In Front of You.

At 18, Greenwood wrote, directed and produced her first short film Faulty Roots about mental health in teens. Faulty Roots screened at film festivals such as BAFTA accredited Bolton International Film Festival, Busan International Kids & Youth Film Festival, and Tallgrass Film Festival, where it won an award. It was given five stars by The Fan Carpet, with UK Film Review calling it 'a rather powerful little story, told with care and genuine affection for its characters'. After it was announced that Faulty Roots was being developed into a feature film, Melanie Walters and Kayleigh-Paige Rees were cast as the leads.

Greenwood's first animation Dreary Days had its premiere at Enimation Film Festival. She has an upcoming film about mental health Self-Charm, co-produced with Tallulah Films and starring Bukky Bakray.

She was awarded Positive Female Role Model of the Year at the Darkus Magazine 2020 Awards.

== Artistry ==
Greenwood stated in an interview that one of her favourite directors is Mike Flanagan as she's a huge fan of horror films. She was featured by Huffington Post in an article about the rise in behind-the-camera exploration for a generation of actors.
