= Muna (2023 film) =

2023 British short film

- Theatrical release poster
- Directed by: Warda Mohamed
- Written by: Warda Mohamed
- Produced by: Angela Moneke; Simon Hatton
- Starring: Kosar Ali
- Cinematography: Olan Collardy
- Edited by: Mdhamiri Á Nkemi
- Music by: Cassie Kinoshi
- Production companies: Monegram; BBC Film; Pink Towel Productions; Rendition Films
- Distributed by: T A P E Collective
- Release dates: 26 October 2023 (Raindance Film Festival); 20 February 2024 (Berlinale)
- Running time: 19 minutes
- Country: United Kingdom
- Languages: English; Somali

Muna is a 2023 British short drama film written and directed by Warda Mohamed. The film starring Kosar Ali in titular role is about teenage dreams, dislocated grief and unexpected connection, following a British-Somali teen navigating a confusing mourning period for a family member she never met.

It was selected in the Generation 14plus section at the 74th Berlin International Film Festival, where it had its International premiere on 20 February and competed for Crystal Bear for the Best Film.

== Synopsis ==
A British-Somali teenager Muna, eagerly wants to join her school trip. She hopes to have fun with her friends, escape the monotony of her home life, and create a greatest playlist. However, her parents are hesitant. Tragedy strikes when her grandfather passes away in Somalia. Muna grapples with mourning for someone she never truly knew, all while still trying to convince her mother about the trip. As she prepares for the wake, Muna reflects on her own life and discovers unexpected connections with her late grandfather.

== Cast ==
- Kosar Ali as Muna
- Raha Isse Farah as Yasmin
- Elmi Rashid Elmi as Abdi
- Ahmed Nur as Ali
- Meena Mohamed as Aunty Mariam
- Osman Omar as Awoowe

== Production ==
The film was produced by Monegram, with BBC Film, Pink Towel Productions, and Rendition Films as co-producers.

== Release ==
Muna was screened at 2023 BFI London Film Festival in 'Network@LFF Shorts' section under 'Programme 1' on 7 October 2023.

The film was screened at the London Short Film Festival under LSFF 2024: 'London Lives' on 25 January 2024.

It had its International premiere on 20 February 2024, as part of the 74th Berlin International Film Festival, in Generation 14plus.

== Accolades ==
| Award | Date | Category | Recipient | Result | Ref. |
|---|---|---|---|---|---|
| Raindance Film Festival | 4 November 2023 | Best Short Film of the Festival | Muna | Nominated | |
| British Short Film Awards | 7 November 2023 | Best Short Film | Muna | Won | |
| British Short Film Awards | 7 November 2023 | Best Actress | Kosar Ali | Won | |
| British Independent Film Awards | 3 December 2023 | Best British Short Film | Warda Mohamed, Angela Moneke and Simon Hatton | Nominated | |
| London Film Critics' Circle | 4 February 2024 | British/Irish Short Film of the Year | Warda Mohamed | Nominated | |
| Berlin International Film Festival | 25 February 2024 | Generation 14plus Crystal Bear for Best Feature Film | Warda Mohamed | Nominated | |
