= Imran Mahmood =

British novelist (born 1969)

- Born: 1969 (age 56–57); Liverpool, England
- Education: Kingston University; Inns of Court
- Occupations: Novelist; barrister

Imran Mahmood (born 1969) is a British novelist and barrister. His first novel You Don't Know Me (2017), which was shortlisted for the Glass Bell Award in 2018, was dramatised by the BBC in 2021.

== Biography ==
Mahmood, whose parents are first-generation immigrants from Pakistan, was born in Liverpool in 1969. Growing up in Liverpool, he attended comprehensive schools. After earning his undergraduate degree in 1990 at Kingston University in London, he studied for the bar at the Inns of Court.

As of 2020 he is a barrister, with chambers in Middle Temple, specialising in criminal law and in common law. He and his wife live in South East London.

== Literary career ==
In Mahmood's first novel, You Don't Know Me, a young man on trial for murder urgently tells his story to a jury. According to Mahmood, the novel was inspired by young men he defended in London courts. The book's 2017 publication was well received. The Guardian listed it as one of the best crime novels of 2017, calling it "an original take on a courtroom drama that puts the reader in the position of the jury ... a gripping, vivid depiction of London’s gang culture with an authentic feel." Simon Mayo selected it as a BBC Radio 2 Book Club Choice in 2017. In 2018, it was shortlisted for the Goldsboro Books Glass Bell Award, which according to Irish Times "is the only award to reward storytelling in all genres, from romance and crime to historical and speculative." It was also longlisted for the 2018 best crime novel of the year, both by the Crime Writers' Association (for the CWA Gold Dagger award) and by the Theakston's Old Peculier Crime Novel of the Year Award (awarded annually at the Harrogate International Festivals).

In 2020, the BBC announced it would be adapting the book into a four-part dramatisation, to be directed by Sarmad Masud. The four-part series began airing in December 2021, with lead roles played by Samuel Adewunmi and Bukky Bakray.

Mahmood's second book, I Know What I Saw, is a thriller about a murder in the affluent London district of Mayfair. It was published by Raven Books, the new crime imprint of Bloomsbury Publishing. Its narrator, formerly a wealthy banker, meets scepticism when police cannot confirm his account of witnessing murder. The Times recommended it as one of their "Best Thrillers for 2021." The Financial Times also praised the book, saying "it affirms his talent."

Mahmood's third book, All I Said Was True, was published in 2022.

== Bibliography ==
- You Don't Know Me 2017 (Penguin) - Shortlisted for the Goldsboro Books Glass Bell Award for storytelling.
- I Know What I Saw 2021 (Raven Books (Bloomsbury))
