= British Independent Film Award for Best Supporting Actress =

- Awarded for: Best Supporting Actress
- Country: United Kingdom
- Presented by: BIFA
- First award: 2008
- Final award: 2021
- Currently held by: Vinette Robinson – Boiling Point (2020)
- Website: www.bifa.org.uk

The British Independent Film Award for Best Supporting Actress is a discontinued annual award given by the British Independent Film Awards (BIFA) to recognize the best supporting performance by an actress in a British independent film.

From 2003 to 2007, only one award was presented for supporting performances named Best Supporting Actor/Actress. Since 2008, two categories named Best Supporting Actor and Best Supporting Actress are presented.

Olivia Colman is the only actress who has won this award more than once since its creations in 2008 with two wins while Kristin Scott Thomas and Julie Walters hold the record of most nominations in this category with three each.

In July 2022, it was announced that the performance categories would be replaced with gender-neutral categories, with both Best Supporting Actor and Best Supporting Actress merging into the Best Lead Performance category. Additionally, a category named Best Joint Lead Performance was created for "two (or exceptionally three) performances that are the joint focus of the film, especially where performances share a large number of scenes and screen time".

== Winners and nominees ==
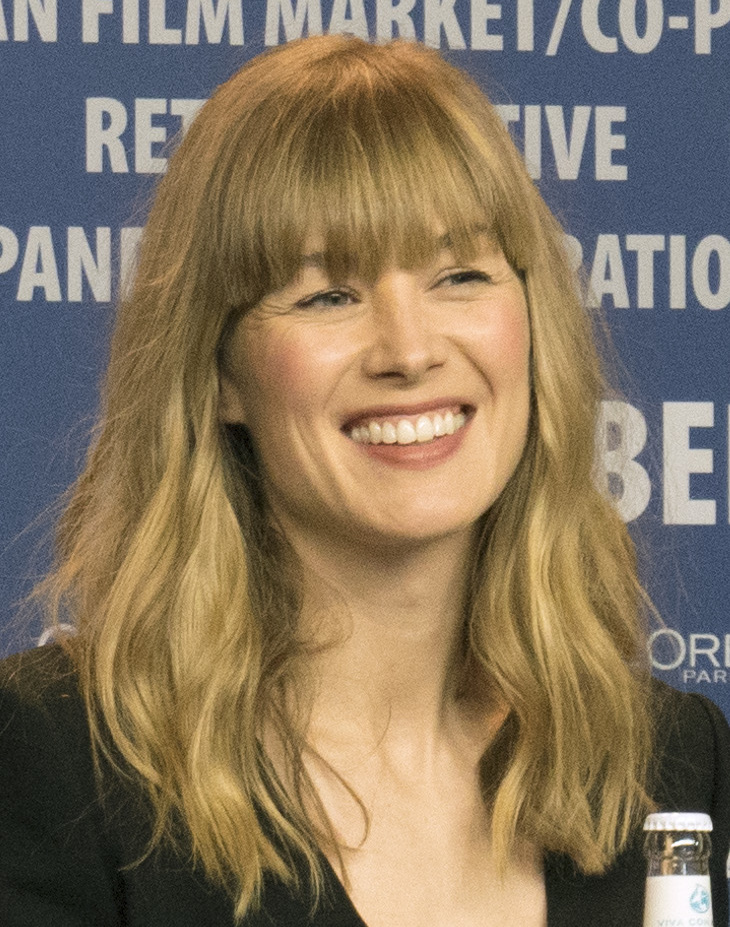
Rosamund Pike won for The Libertine (2005).

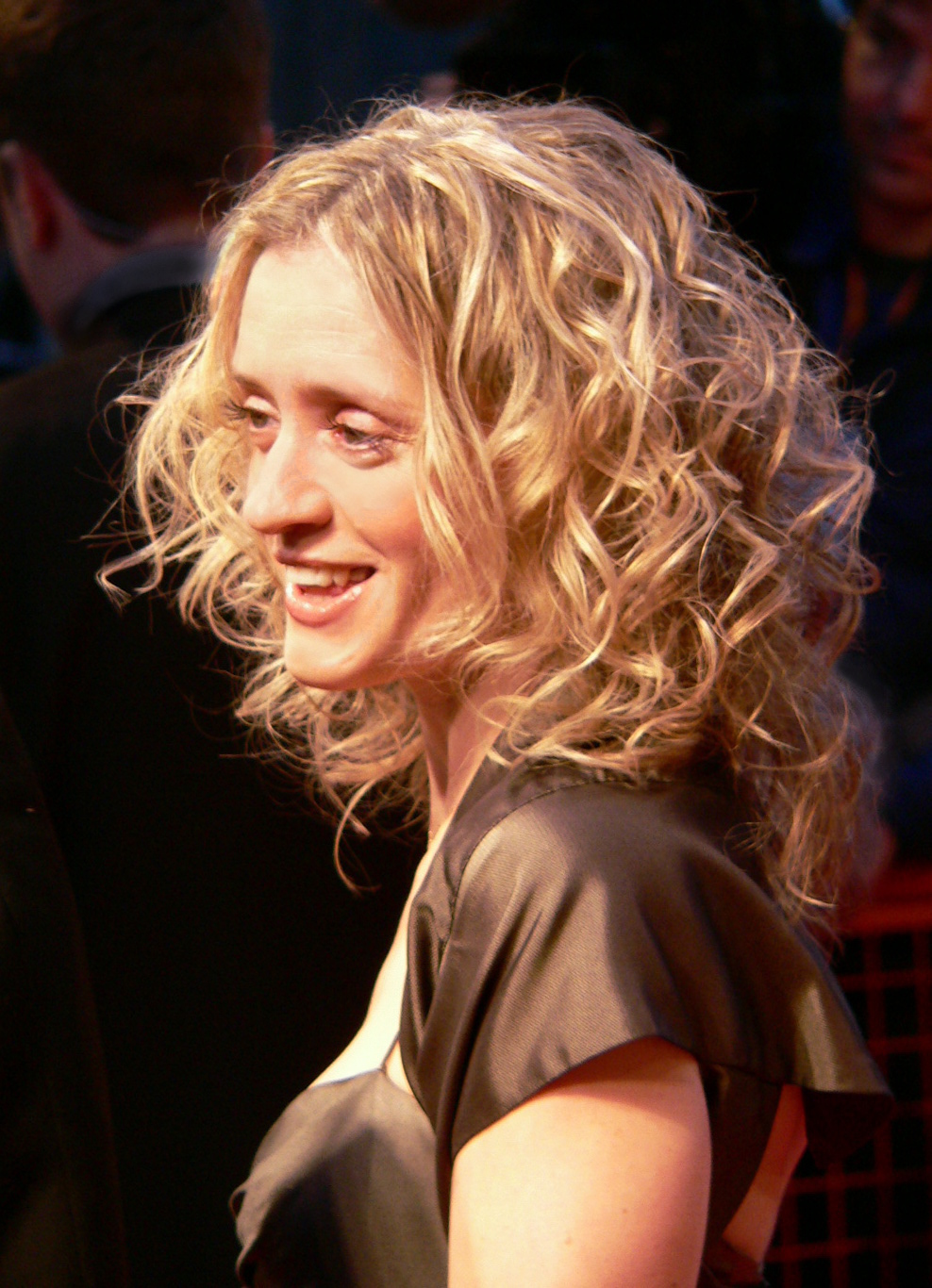
Anne-Marie Duff won for Nowhere Boy (2009).

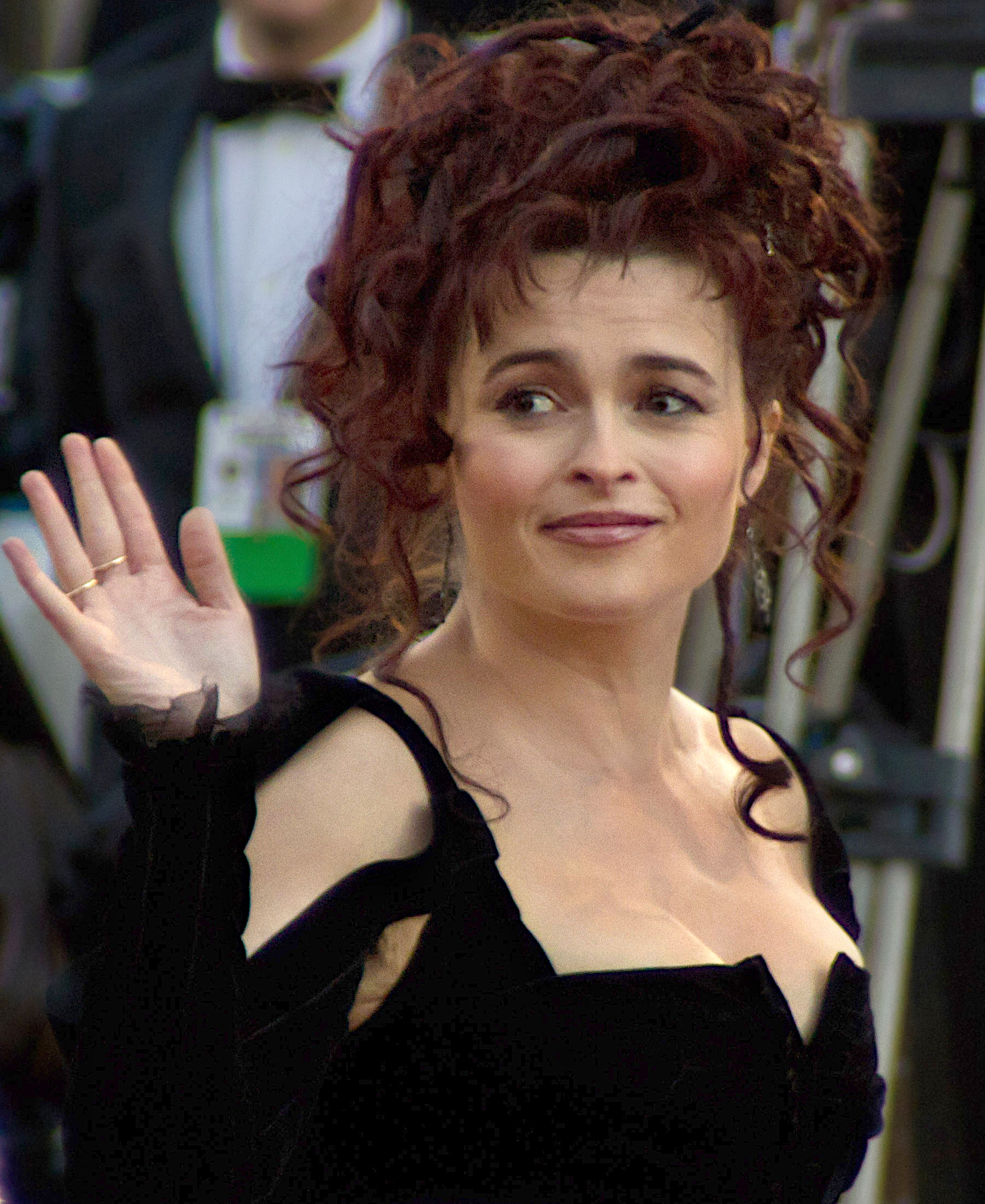
Helena Bonham Carter won for The King's Speech (2010).

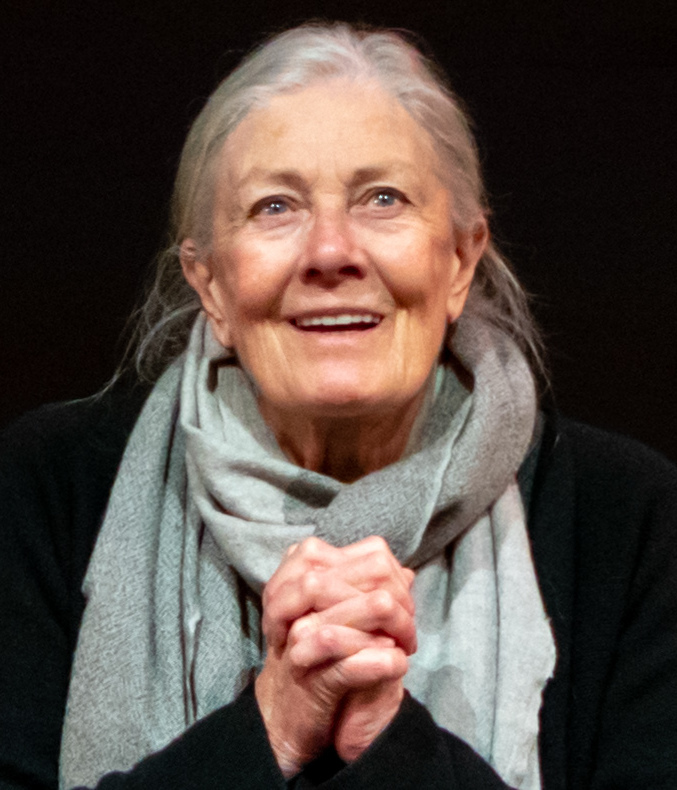
Vanessa Redgrave won for Coriolanus (2011).

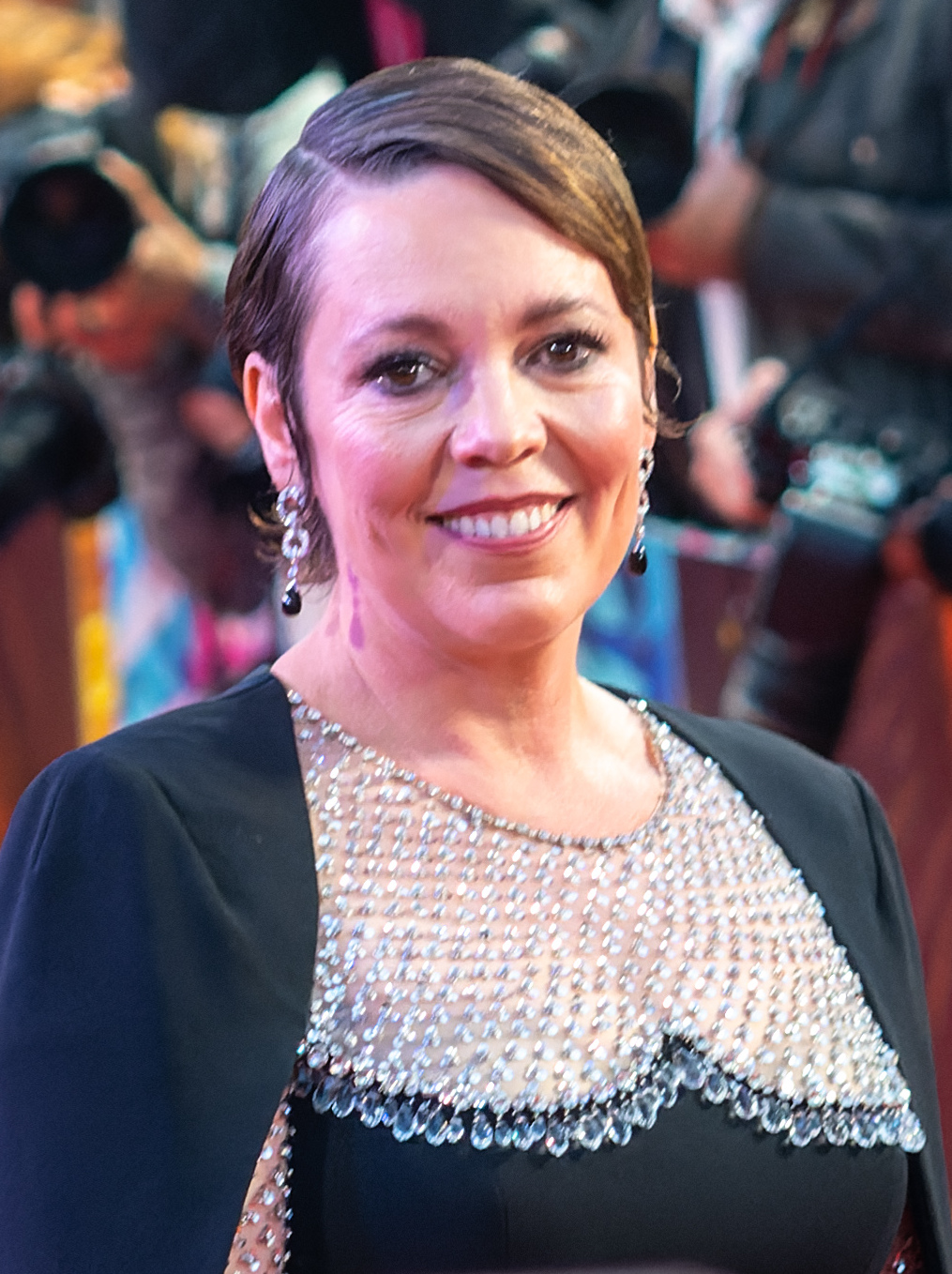
Olivia Colman has won for Hyde Park on Hudson (2012) and The Lobster (2015).

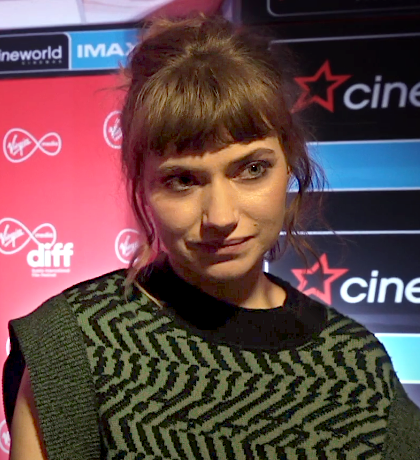
Imogen Poots won for The Look of Love (2013).

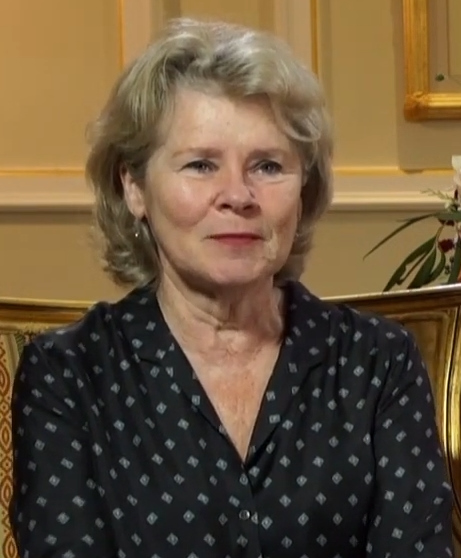
Imelda Staunton won for Pride (2014).

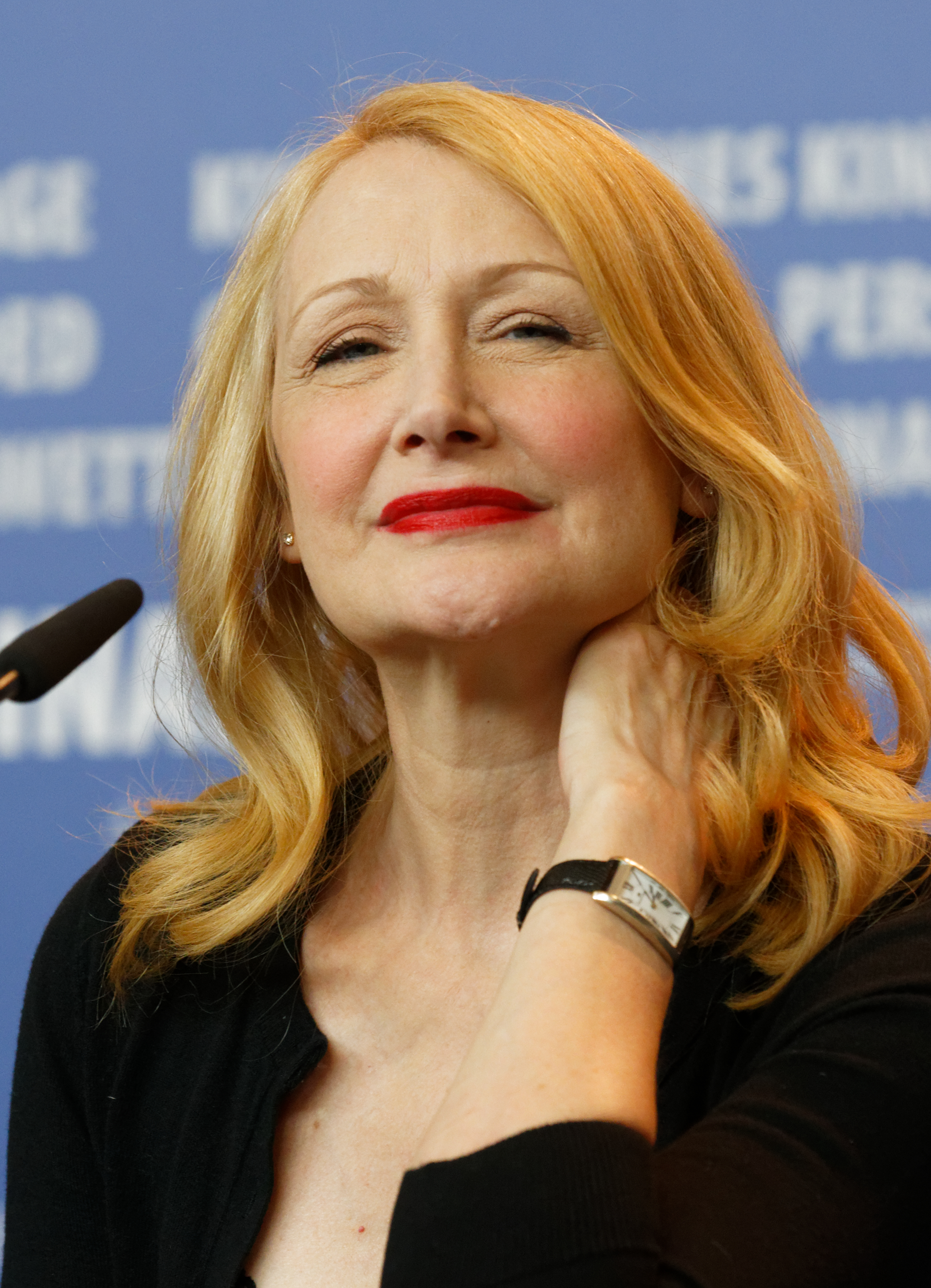
Patricia Clarkson won for The Party (2017).

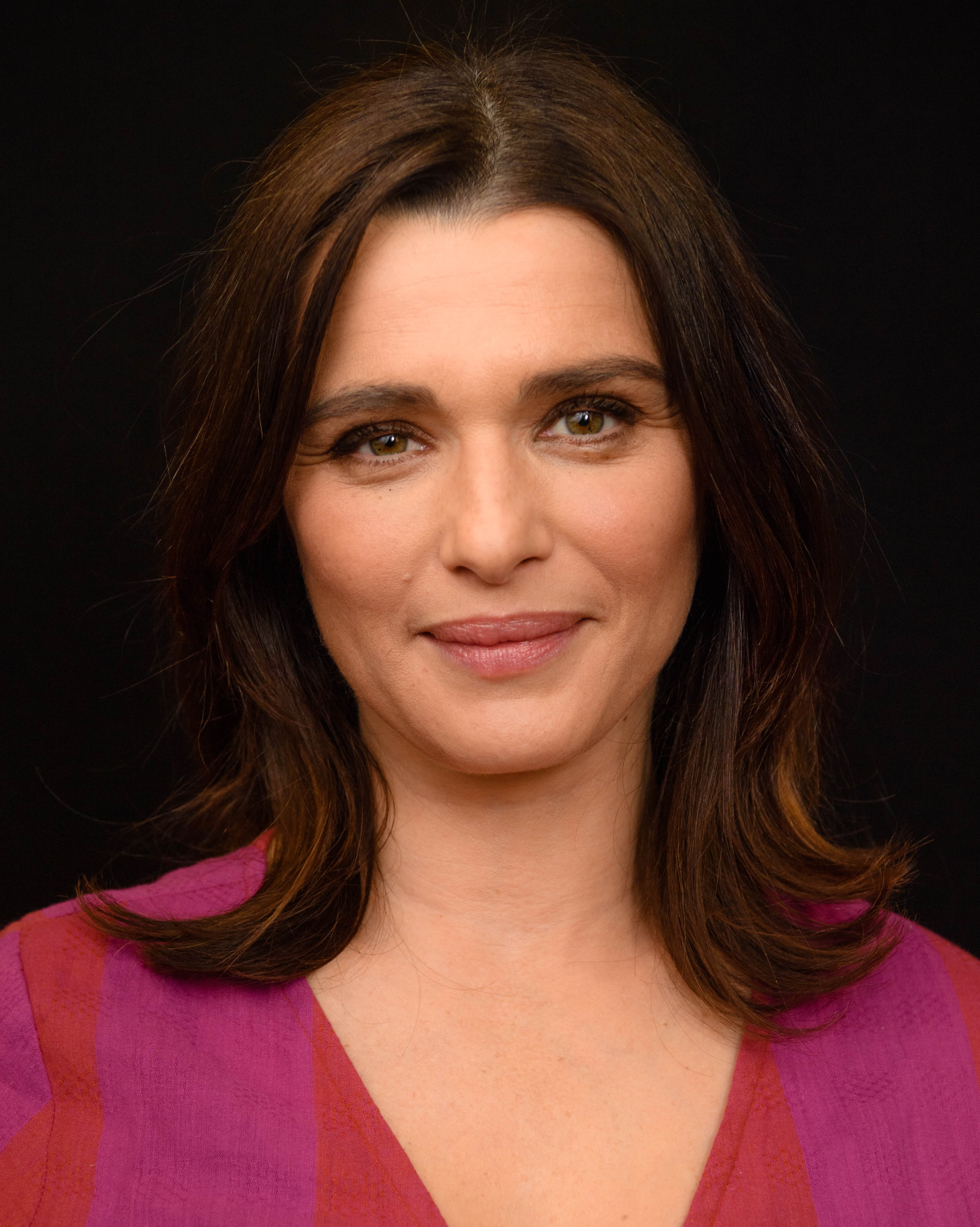
Rachel Weisz won for The Favourite (2018).

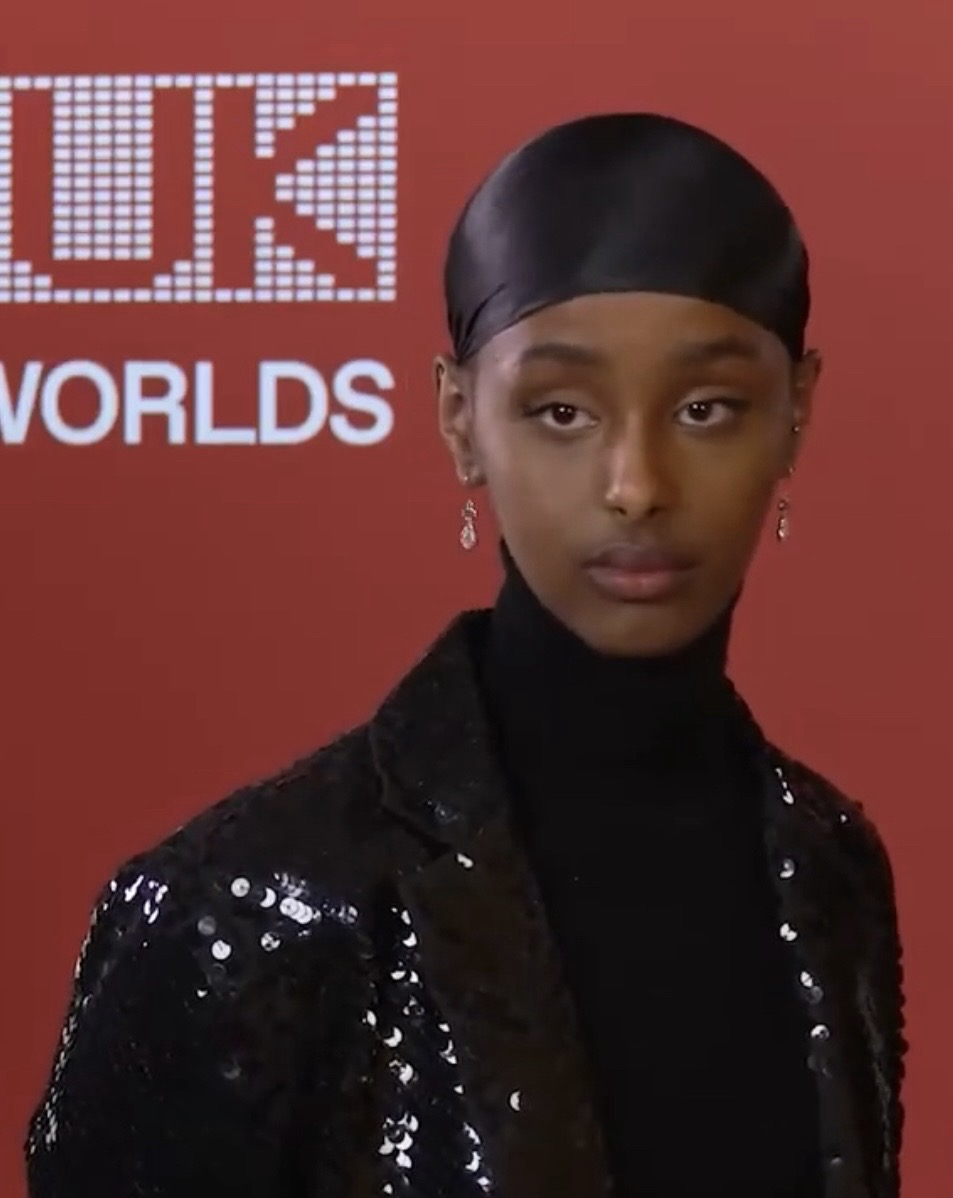
Kosar Ali won for Rocks (2019).

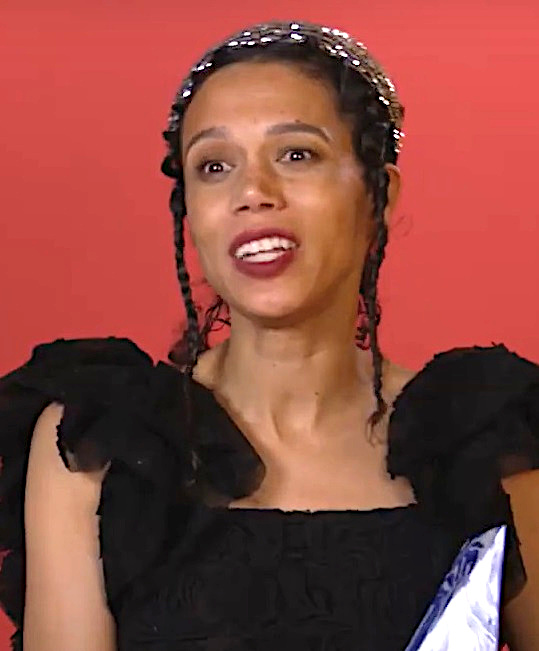
Vinette Robinson won for Boiling Point (2021).

=== 2000s ===
Best Supporting Actor/Actress

Year	Actor/Actress	Film	Character
2003 (6th)	Susan Lynch	16 Years of Alcohol	Mary
2003 (6th)	Shirley Henderson	Wilbur Wants to Kill Himself	Alice
2003 (6th)	Sophie Okonedo	Dirty Pretty Things	Juliette
2003 (6th)	Adrian Rawlins	Wilbur Wants to Kill Himself	Harbour
2003 (6th)	Benedict Wong	Dirty Pretty Things	Guo Yi
2004 (7th)	Eddie Marsan	Vera Drake	Reg
2004 (7th)	Paddy Considine	My Summer of Love	Phil
2004 (7th)	Romola Garai	Rory O'Shea Was Here	Siobhán
2004 (7th)	Samantha Morton	Enduring Love	Claire
2004 (7th)	Gary Stretch	Dead Man's Shoes	Sonny
2005 (8th)	Rosamund Pike	The Libertine	Elizabeth Wilmot, Countess of Rochester
2005 (8th)	Rob Brydon	A Cock and Bull Story	Captain Toby Shandy / Rob Brydon
2005 (8th)	Tom Hollander	The Libertine	George Etherege
2005 (8th)	Bill Nighy	The Constant Gardener	Sir Bernard Pellegrin
2005 (8th)	Kelly Reilly	Mrs Henderson Presents	Maureen Ashford
2006 (9th)	Leslie Phillips	Venus	Ian
2006 (9th)	Martin Compston	Red Road	Stevie
2006 (9th)	Joseph Gilgun	This Is England	Woody
2006 (9th)	Stephen Graham	This Is England	Combo
2006 (9th)	Vanessa Redgrave	Venus	Valerie
2007 (10th)	Toby Kebbell	Control	Rob Gretton
2007 (10th)	Cate Blanchett	Notes on a Scandal	Sheba Hart
2007 (10th)	Colin Firth	And When Did You Last See Your Father?	Blake Morrison
2007 (10th)	Samantha Morton	Control	Deborah Curtis
2007 (10th)	Armin Mueller-Stahl	Eastern Promises	Vor Semyon

Best Supporting Actress

Year	Actress	Film	Character
2008 (11th)	Alexis Zegerman	Happy-Go-Lucky	Zoe
2008 (11th)	Hayley Atwell	The Duchess	Elizabeth "Bess" Foster
2008 (11th)	Sienna Miller	The Edge of Love	Caitlin Thomas
2008 (11th)	Kristin Scott Thomas	Easy Virtue	Veronica Whittaker
2008 (11th)	Emma Thompson	Brideshead Revisited	Lady Marchmain
2009 (12th)	Anne-Marie Duff	Nowhere Boy	Julia Lennon
2009 (12th)	Kerry Fox	Bright Star	Mrs. Brawne
2009 (12th)	Rosamund Pike	An Education	Helen
2009 (12th)	Kristin Scott Thomas	Nowhere Boy	Mimi Smith
2009 (12th)	Kierston Wareing	Fish Tank	Joanne Williams

=== 2010s ===
Year	Actress	Film	Character
2010 (13th)	Helena Bonham Carter	The King's Speech	Queen Elizabeth
2010 (13th)	Tamsin Greig	Tamara Drewe	Beth Hardiment
2010 (13th)	Keira Knightley	Never Let Me Go	Ruth C
2010 (13th)	Lesley Manville	Another Year	Mary Smith
2010 (13th)	Rosamund Pike	Made in Dagenham	Lisa Hopkins
2011 (14th)	Vanessa Redgrave	Coriolanus	Volumnia
2011 (14th)	Kathy Burke	Tinker Tailor Soldier Spy	Connie Sachs
2011 (14th)	Sally Hawkins	Submarine	Jill Tate
2011 (14th)	Felicity Jones	Albatross	Beth Fischer
2011 (14th)	Carey Mulligan	Shame	Sissy Sullivan
2012 (15th)	Olivia Colman	Hyde Park on Hudson	Queen Elizabeth
2012 (15th)	Eileen Davies	Sightseers	Carol
2012 (15th)	Alice Englert	Ginger and Rosa	Rosa
2012 (15th)	Vanessa Redgrave	Song for Marion	Marion
2012 (15th)	Maggie Smith	The Best Exotic Marigold Hotel	Muriel Donnelly
2013 (16th)	Imogen Poots	The Look of Love	Debbie Raymond
2013 (16th)	Siobhan Finneran	The Selfish Giant	Mrs. Swift
2013 (16th)	Shirley Henderson	Filth	Bunty Blades
2013 (16th)	Kristin Scott Thomas	The Invisible Woman	Frances Ternan
2013 (16th)	Mia Wasikowska	The Double	Hannah
2014 (17th)	Imelda Staunton	Pride	Hefina Headon
2014 (17th)	Dorothy Atkinson	Mr. Turner	Hannah Danby
2014 (17th)	Sienna Guillory	The Goob	Janet Taylor
2014 (17th)	Maggie Gyllenhaal	Frank	Clara
2014 (17th)	Sally Hawkins	X+Y	Julie Ellis
2015 (18th)	Olivia Colman	The Lobster	The Hotel Manager
2015 (18th)	Helena Bonham Carter	Suffragette	Edith Ellyn
2015 (18th)	Anne-Marie Duff	Suffragette	Violet Miller
2015 (18th)	Sienna Miller	High-Rise	Charlotte Melville
2015 (18th)	Julie Walters	Brooklyn	Madge Kehoe
2016 (19th)	Avin Manshadi	Under the Shadow	Dorsa
2016 (19th)	Gemma Arterton	The Girl with All the Gifts	Helen Justineau
2016 (19th)	Naomie Harris	Our Kind of Traitor	Gail Perkins
2016 (19th)	Terry Pheto	A United Kingdom	Naledi Khama
2016 (19th)	Shana Swash	My Feral Heart	Eve
2017 (20th)	Patricia Clarkson	The Party	April
2017 (20th)	Naomi Ackie	Lady Macbeth	Anna
2017 (20th)	Kelly Macdonald	Goodbye Christopher Robin	Olive
2017 (20th)	Andrea Riseborough	The Death of Stalin	Svetlana Stalin
2017 (20th)	Julie Walters	Film Stars Don't Die in Liverpool	Bella Turner
2018 (21st)	Rachel Weisz	The Favourite	Lady Sarah
2018 (21st)	Nina Arianda	Stan & Ollie	Ida Kitaeva Laurel
2018 (21st)	Rachel McAdams	Disobedience	Esti Kuperman
2018 (21st)	Emma Stone	The Favourite	Abigail
2018 (21st)	Molly Wright	Apostasy	Alex
2019 (22nd)	Ruthxjiah Bellenea	The Last Tree	Tope
2019 (22nd)	Jessica Barden	Scarborough	Beth
2019 (22nd)	Elizabeth Debicki	Vita and Virginia	Virginia Woolf
2019 (22nd)	Tilda Swinton	The Personal History of David Copperfield	Betsey Trotwood
2019 (22nd)	Julie Walters	Wild Rose	Marion Harlan

=== 2020s ===
Year	Actress	Film	Character
2020 (23rd)	Kosar Ali	Rocks	Sumaya
2020 (23rd)	Niamh Algar	Calm with Horses	Ursula
2020 (23rd)	Jennifer Ehle	Saint Maud	Amanda
2020 (23rd)	Ashley Madekwe	County Lines	Tony
2020 (23rd)	Fiona Shaw	Kindred	Margaret
2021 (24th)	Vinette Robinson	Boiling Point	Carly
2021 (24th)	Judi Dench	Belfast	Buddy's grandmother
2021 (24th)	Jo Hartley	Sweetheart	Tina
2021 (24th)	Nathalie Richard	After Love	Genevieve
2021 (24th)	Tilda Swinton	The Souvenir Part II	Rosalind

== Multiple nominations ==
3 nominations

- Kristin Scott Thomas
- Julie Walters

2 nominations

- Helena Bonham Carter
- Olivia Colman
- Anne-Marie Duff
- Sally Hawkins
- Sienna Miller
- Rosamund Pike
- Vanessa Redgrave

== Multiple wins ==
2 wins

- Olivia Colman

== See also ==
- Academy Award for Best Supporting Actress
- BAFTA Award for Best Actress in a Supporting Role
- Critics' Choice Movie Award for Best Supporting Actress
- Golden Globe Award for Best Supporting Actress – Motion Picture
- Screen Actors Guild Award for Outstanding Performance by a Female Actor in a Supporting Role
