= Lovesick (British TV series) =

2014 British sitcom

- Also known as: Scrotal Recall (series one title)
- Genre: Sitcom
- Created by: Tom Edge
- Written by: Tom Edge; Ed Macdonald; Andy Baker; Mike Grimmer
- Directed by: Elliot Hegarty; Gordon Anderson; Aneil Karia
- Starring: Johnny Flynn; Antonia Thomas; Daniel Ings; Hannah Britland; Joshua McGuire
- Opening theme: "Lovesick Theme"
- Composer: Si Begg
- Country of origin: United Kingdom
- Original language: English
- No. of series: 3
- No. of episodes: 22

Production
- Executive producers: Murray Ferguson; Andy Baker; Ed Macdonald; Tom Edge
- Producer: Charlie Leech
- Production locations: Glasgow, Scotland
- Running time: 21–27 minutes
- Production company: Clerkenwell Films

Original release
- Network: Channel 4
- Release: 2 October – 6 November 2014
- Network: Netflix
- Release: 17 November 2016 – 1 January 2018

Lovesick (formerly known as Scrotal Recall) is a British sitcom created by Tom Edge which was first broadcast on Channel 4 in October 2014 and stars Johnny Flynn, Antonia Thomas, Daniel Ings, Hannah Britland and Joshua McGuire. After the show was originally aired on Channel 4, it was made available by Netflix, who then commissioned a second season globally on 17 November 2016, billed as a Netflix Original. The show concluded with a third season, which was released exclusively on Netflix on 1 January 2018. The show was removed from the platform in January 2025. In February 2026, all three series were made available in the United Kingdom on ITVX.

== Plot ==
The show revolves around a group of university friends sharing a house in Glasgow and their romantic lives. After Dylan Witter (Flynn) is diagnosed with chlamydia, he attempts to contact all of his previous sexual partners to inform them of his diagnosis. Dylan lives with best friends Luke Curran (Ings) and Evie Douglas (Thomas), the latter of whom previously harboured a secret crush on Dylan, but has since moved on, recently becoming engaged. The majority of each episode is told through flashback, showing Dylan's encounters with a number of women, as well as the changes his friends go through.

The third season, released in January 2018, focuses more on Dylan, Evie and Luke's relationships with each other, and Angus's (McGuire) own personal problems.

== Cast ==
=== Main ===
- Johnny Flynn as Dylan Witter, the protagonist of the show. He is a vaguely inept romantic who goes from one casual relationship to another, usually expecting more than there is to offer. He works in landscaping, as a garden designer and previously briefly worked as a barista. Luke refers to him as "Dyl" or "Dyldo". His parents Julian (Tony Gardner) and Janie (Siobhan Redmond) appear in season three.
- Antonia Thomas as Evelyn "Evie" Douglas, Dylan and Luke's best friend. She is barbed, sarcastic and usually single. She appears to have underlying feelings for Dylan, although these are confused by the situation between them. Evie works as an illustrator and photographer. She is engaged to Mal throughout the first and second series.
- Daniel Ings as Luke Curran, best friend and flatmate of Dylan and Evie. He is feckless, irresponsible and shallow, however he has a strong affection for his friends and often goes out of his own way to help them. Luke works as an app developer for a company called Volcano Media. His mother is seen in a photograph in the series one episode "Cressida", particularly because Luke and his mum previously shared the same haircut.
- Hannah Britland as Abigail Saunders, the barmaid at Angus and Helen's wedding, and one of Dylan's former lovers. After he contacts her to inform her of his diagnosis, they resume their casual relationship. Although not her main employment, throughout the series she is a writer who wishes to have a career in storytelling.
- Joshua McGuire as Angus Baker, a friend of Dylan, Luke and Evie's from university. He is slightly childish but appears to be the most academic member of the group with a background in mathematics.
- Richard Thomson as Malcolm "Mal", Evie's fiancé. He is introduced as a friend of Anna's. A former soldier, Mal is a Police Constable and uses this to his advantage to help Evie and her friends. Mal has a nut allergy which is highlighted when Evie accidentally feeds him pine kernels on Valentine's Day. His parents Fiona (Deborah Findlay) and Richard (Karl Johnson) feature in the episode "Jonesy". Despite being set in Glasgow, Thomson is the only Scottish actor in the main cast of the series.
- Klariza Clayton as Holly, a stripper who meets Angus and the group on her first day in the strip club. After a lap dance, she develops a relationship with Angus.
- Yasmine Akram as Maria "Jonesy" Jones, a bubbly and vivacious friend of the group from university. She has a strict no-relationship policy.

=== Recurring ===
- Susannah Fielding as Phoebe Morris, Dylan's date to a quiz-night who he realises is the female equivalent of Luke. Although Phoebe was dating Dylan at the time, Luke has a deep affection for her, which continues in series 3. Phoebe dies almost five years after her relationship with Dylan ended from an unknown cause and this greatly affects Luke.
- Riann Steele as Cleo, a short-term girlfriend of Luke's, who goes on to become his therapist.
- Jamie Demetriou as Samuels, Luke's workmate in app development at Volcano Media. He is gifted with exceptional memory, often recalling Luke's past mistakes. He appears to have a close and supportive friendship with both Luke and McNeish.
- Turlough Convery as McNeish, a colleague of Luke's. He seems friendly but laddish, to the point of offering a principal investor in his company MDMA.
- Laura Aikman as Jo, Luke's ex-girlfriend whose break-up with him deeply affected him.
- Stephen Wight as Jonno, one of Luke's former co-workers as an app developer. He usually introduces himself with "I'm Jonno."
- Jessica Ellerby as Jane Ansell, a short-term, sexually permissive former girlfriend of Dylan's three and a half years before his diagnosis.
- Aimee Parkes as Helen, the domineering wife of Angus. She seems to love Angus despite her personality, and Angus feels her anger is caused by her belief that he does not love her equally.

=== Dylan's list ===
- Hannah Britland as Abigail
- Nikki Amuka-Bird as Anna
- Natalie Burt as Cressida
- Jessica Ellerby as Jane Ansell
- Rosalie Craig as Bethany
- Susannah Fielding as Phoebe Morris
- Antonia Clarke as Frankie
- Katrine De Candole as Agata
- Jade Ogugua as Amy Douglas
- Jenny Bede as Isabel
- Cassie Layton as Emma
- Yasmine Akram as Maria Jones
- Claudia Jessie as Tasha

=== Other appearances ===
- James Martin as Dylan's neighbour
- Cara Theobold as Ilona
- Kevin O'Loughlin as Charlie
- Duncan Pow as Gareth
- David Westhead as Alexander
- Karl Johnson as Richard
- Deborah Findlay as Fiona
- Ian Kelsey as James Hamilton
- Pearce Quigley as Simon
- Tony Gardner as Julian Witter
- Siobhan Redmond as Janie Witter
- Melanie Hudson as Martha Wells
- Paul Ritter as Peter
- Gabriella Swinyard as Various Roles

== Episodes ==
Series	Episodes	Originally released		
Series	Episodes	First released	Last released	Network
1	6	2 October 2014	6 November 2014	Channel 4
2	8	17 November 2016		Netflix
3	8	1 January 2018		Netflix

=== Series 1 (2014) ===
No. overall	No. in series	Title	Directed by	Written by	Original release date
1	1	"Abigail"	Elliot Hegarty	Tom Edge	2 October 2014
Dylan (Johnny Flynn) must contact all the girls he has ever had sex with to inform them that he has chlamydia. He casts his mind back three years ago to Abigail (Hannah Britland), the first girl on his alphabetical list of exes, whom he met at Angus's (Joshua McGuire) wedding. A flashback reveals a defining moment he had previously tried to forget. Dylan attended the wedding with Jane, who breaks up with him.
2	2	"Anna"	Elliot Hegarty	Tom Edge	9 October 2014
In a flashback to 18 months ago, Luke (Daniel Ings) is enjoying the best sex of his life with psychology student Cleo (Riann Steele), but he is keen to avoid deep conversation in case she realises that he is actually quite shallow. When Dylan gets dragged along on their date he takes a shine to mature student Anna (Nikki Amuka-Bird). To Luke's dismay, Dylan invites the girls over for a proper dinner party where he hopes to impress.
3	3	"Cressida"	Elliot Hegarty	Tom Edge	16 October 2014
In a flashback to 10 months earlier, Luke drags Dylan and Evie (Antonia Thomas) to a posh party in the country. Luke is desperate to have sex with childhood crush Ilona McLeod (Cara Theobold), who holds a prominent position on his 'things to do before I die' list. Meanwhile, a bored Dylan and Evie amuse themselves by attempting some of the unchecked items on Luke's bucket list, with disastrous and unexpected results, including a liaison between Dylan and Evie.
4	4	"Jane"	Gordon Anderson	Tom Edge	23 October 2014
In a flashback to three years and one month ago, it is Evie's birthday and she plans to tell Dylan about her feelings for him over a quiet meal, but before she has a chance, all their friends jump out to surprise her, including Dylan's new girlfriend Jane (Jessica Ellerby) and Jonno (Stephen Wight), a horribly incompatible date that Luke has brought along for Evie.
5	5	"Bethany"	Gordon Anderson	Tom Edge	30 October 2014
In a flashback to four years ago, Dylan has been seeing Bethany (Rosalie Craig) for several months, but when she invites her protective big brother over to dinner a terrifying thought occurs to him that he has fallen into a serious relationship with her. Meanwhile, Luke drags Evie away from a photo assignment to a work bowling night in order to find out why his new boss Diana (Clare Wille) has turned all the women in the office against him.
6	6	"Phoebe"	Gordon Anderson	Tom Edge	6 November 2014
Dylan sets about tracking down Phoebe (Susannah Fielding) who has not returned any of his messages. This prompts a flashback to five years ago when the gang are at a pub quiz, when Evie was dating Angus, but is planning to break up with him. Dylan is dating Phoebe, but they break up. In the present, things take an unexpected turn for everyone.

=== Series 2 (2016) ===
No. overall	No. in series	Title	Directed by	Written by	Original release date
7	1	"Frankie"	Elliot Hegarty	Tom Edge	17 November 2016
After confessing his feelings to Evie, Dylan has a flashback to a disastrous weekend camping with Frankie (Antonia Clarke) six months ago.
8	2	"Agata"	Elliot Hegarty	Tom Edge	17 November 2016
In the present, Dylan begins seeing Abigail. In a flashback to six and a half years ago, Dylan first meets Evie at a house party with his German girlfriend Agata (Katrine De Candole) who does not speak a word of English. Meanwhile, Luke's girlfriend Jo (Laura Aikman) breaks up with him shortly before he is about to propose to her.
9	3	"Amy"	Elliot Hegarty	Tom Edge	17 November 2016
In a flashback to six years ago, Dylan sleeps with Amy (Jade Ogugua) and subsequently finds out that she is Evie's sister. In the present, Angus' friends encourage him to start dating, while Luke struggles with his feelings after learning of Phoebe's death.
10	4	"Liv"	Elliott Hegarty	Tom Edge	17 November 2016
In a flashback to three and a half years ago, Angus and Helen are at each other's throats while checking out the potential hotel for the wedding with Dylan, Evie, and Luke. Meanwhile, Dylan struggles to communicate with his girlfriend Liv. In the present, Luke starts to discuss his problems with Cleo, who is now a therapist.
11	5	"Isabel"	Gordon Anderson	Tom Edge	17 November 2016
In a flashback to two and a half years ago, Evie, Dylan and Luke attend a drunken awards ceremony, with Luke determined to beat Jonno to an award in order to impress his boss Alexander (David Westhead) and to keep his friends jobs. Meanwhile, Evie drunkenly kisses Dylan, who engages with workaholic Isabel (Jenny Bede).
12	6	"Emma"	Gordon Anderson	Tom Edge	17 November 2016
In a flashback to fifteen months ago, Dylan finds himself conflicted between his girlfriend Emma (Cassie Layton), and his co-worker Cara (Sara Vickers) on Valentine's Day. Meanwhile, Luke struggles with his feelings when he encounters ex-girlfriend Jo, and Evie makes a mistake when cooking a birthday meal for Mal. In the present, Luke continues to discuss his feelings with Cleo, while Abigail moves into her new apartment, and keeps a drawer for Dylan's clothes
13	7	"Jonesy?"	Gordon Anderson	Tom Edge, Ed Macdonald & Andy Baker	17 November 2016
Dylan meets with Jonesy (Yasmine Akram) in the present, who claims to have not slept with him. In a flashback to three months before, Dylan encounters college friend Jonesy during a night out. After going to a strip club, Angus sleeps with a stripper named Holly (Klariza Clayton). Meanwhile, Evie struggles with her feelings after Mal's parents inform her that the wedding won't be in her preferred location.
14	8	"Abigail (Again)"	Gordon Anderson	Tom Edge	17 November 2016
The episode flashes back and forth between the present and the previous night where Angus is celebrating his divorce. During the celebration, Abigail learns that Dylan has slept with Evie. Holly locates Angus, and tells him she is pregnant with his baby. Angus announces their engagement to everyone. In the present, Dylan finds an upset Abigail, while Evie confesses her feelings for Dylan to Luke.

=== Series 3 (2018) ===
No. overall	No. in series	Title	Directed by	Written by	Original release date
15	1	"Andi and Olivia"	Aneil Karia	Tom Edge	1 January 2018
The gang accompanies Abigail to a literary festival, where Luke tries to woo women with poetry and Angus and Holly discover their differences.
16	2	"Bonnie"	Aneil Karia	Andy Baker	1 January 2018
Evie's cousin arrives for her hen party, which Dylan forgot to cancel. An afternoon of soap making and karaoke devolves into drunken mischief.
17	3	"Abigail (Again, Again)"	Aneil Karia	Tom Edge	1 January 2018
While out for his birthday, Luke pursues a soulful singer -- but he's got competition. Dylan, Evie and Abigail try to sort out their tangled history.
18	4	"Evie"	Gordon Anderson	Tom Edge	1 January 2018
Dylan, Evie and Luke sift through the tricky aftermath of a big night at the club. Meanwhile, Angus invests in a posh new mattress.
19	5	"Martha"	Gordon Anderson	Mark Grimmer	1 January 2018
A surprise party for Dylan's parents takes an awkward turn. Luke and Jonesy try something new. Angus gets questionable advice from a fellow divorcé.
20	6	"Queen of Cups"	Gordon Anderson	Tom Edge	1 January 2018
At a charity carnival, Jonesy plays matchmaker for Luke, Dylan and Evie visit a fortuneteller, and Angus sets his sights on a giant stuffed bear.
21	7	"Tasha"	Aneil Karia	Ed Macdonald	1 January 2018
Dylan spots -- and hides from -- Tasha, the final name on his list of exes. Evie and Dylan's new relationship leaves Luke feeling adrift.
22	8	"Evie (Again)"	Gordon Anderson	Tom Edge	1 January 2018
At a college reunion, Luke finds new ways to avoid dealing with his feelings, Angus considers a business proposition, and Dylan meets Evie's ex.

== Production ==
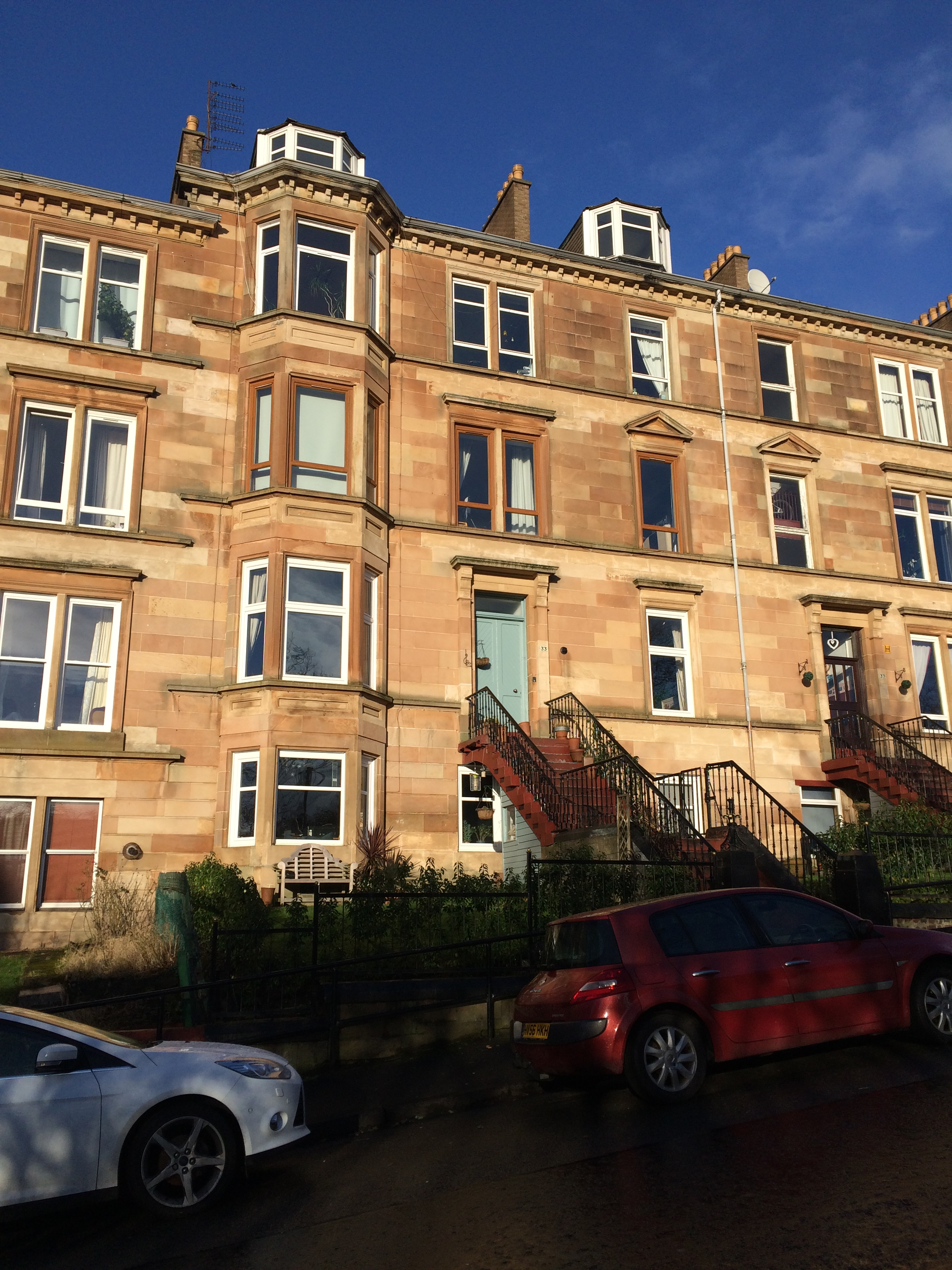
The external scenes of the group's flat were filmed at this building in Mount Florida. 55°49′37.86″N 4°15′27.45″W

The first series was made available on Netflix in the United States in April 2015 and was billed as a "Netflix Original". The show found enough success on the site that Netflix went on to commission a second series of 8 episodes, without Channel 4's involvement. The second series debuted globally on the streaming network in November 2016.

Lovesick was filmed in numerous locations in and around Glasgow, Scotland. Most outdoor scenes were filmed in the West End of the city, and the series has featured Kelvingrove Park, the University of Glasgow and Partick.

=== Name change ===
After its transfer from Channel 4 to Netflix, the show was renamed from Scrotal Recall to Lovesick. Antonia Thomas noted that while the former name technically made sense, it completely mis-sold the tone of the show. Thomas admitted to being pleased with the name change, and noted that the second series would continue to follow the same format as the first, but would go more in-depth.

== Reception ==
Lovesick received critical acclaim for its storyline and acting performances. The review aggregator Rotten Tomatoes gave the series an average score of 98%, based on 41 total reviews among the three seasons. Paste magazine said "This honest approach is refreshing in a world of sitcoms focusing on wealthy lads and ladies moving from their college dorms straight into Manhattan lofts and prosperous careers. Lovesick is all about keeping it real."
