= Kosar Ali =

British actress

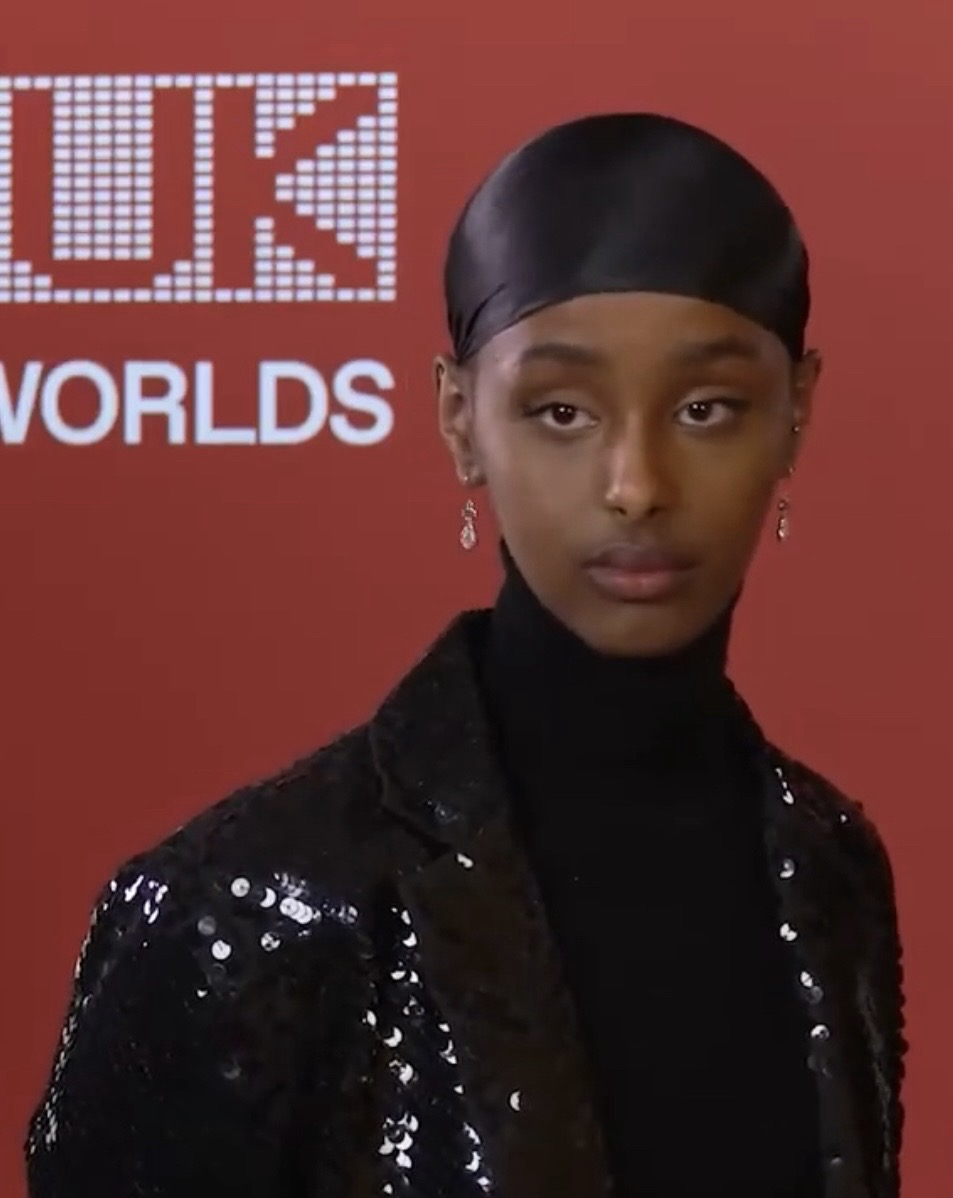
- Ali at the British Independent Film Awards 2021
- Born: 21 December 2003 (age 22); London, England
- Occupation: Actress / Producer
- Years active: 2019–present

Kosar Ali (born 21 December 2003) is a British actress. Her debut role in the 2019 film Rocks leading her with a nomination at only 17 for Best Supporting Actress at the 74th British Academy Film Awards whilst also being the youngest recipient to win two British Independent Film Awards. She plays Victoire in Dangerous Liaisons on Starz.

== Early and personal life ==
Ali lives in Newham, East London. She comes from a large British Somali Muslim family she had no acting experience before being street cast.

== Career ==
Ali was discovered at her school when she was 13 years old by director Sarah Gavron and casting director Lucy Pardee as they were street casting for the film Rocks. The actresses were given a story outline, but no dialogue, and worked chronologically with Gavron and the writers, Theresa Ikoko and Claire Wilson. Occasionally the actresses were not even told the cameras were rolling; they naturally fell into conversations that were filmed without the director calling "action" or "cut". Gavron said that she even reshot a classroom scene which Ali told her was not working authentically.

The film premiered at the Toronto International Film Festival in 2019 and opened in Britain on 18 September 2020. For her work on this film Ali was nominated at the British Academy and Film awards in the Best Supporting Actress category being the first hijabi woman to be nominated for this. Ali also was one of the youngest actors to win two British Independent Film Awards (BIFA), for 'supporting actress' and 'most promising newcomer', in February 2021.

In 2021, Ali starred in a BBC comedy short, PRU, about unruly adolescents in the British system; the title stands for Pupil Referral Unit, an alternative schooling system for badly behaved students.

In 2022, she plays the leading role of Victoire in the Starz television series Dangerous Liaisons.

In 2023 she starred in two short films Muna which she also produced and Luna as well as her debut performance in WorldPlay at the royal court theatre which she has had critical acclaim for.

== Accolades ==
Year	Award	Category	Result	Ref
2021	British Independent Film Awards	BIFA for Best Supporting Actress	Won	
2021	British Independent Film Awards	Most Promising Newcomer	Won	
2021	British Academy Film Awards	Best Actress in a Supporting Role	Nominated	

== Filmography ==
Year	Title	Role	Notes
2019	Rocks	Sumaya	Debut role; Ali was one of the youngest winners of 2 British Independent Film Awards
2021	PRU	Hani	1 episode
2022	Dangerous Liaisons	Victoire	8 episodes
2023	Muna	Muna	International premiere at 74th Berlin International Film Festival, on 20 February 2024.
2023	Luna		
2023	Royal court		
