= Rocks (film) =

2019 British drama film

- Promotional poster
- Directed by: Sarah Gavron
- Written by: Theresa Ikoko; Claire Wilson
- Produced by: Ameenah Ayub Allen; Faye Ward
- Starring: Bukky Bakray; Kosar Ali; D'angelou Osei Kissiedu; Shaneigha-Monik Greyson; Ruby Stokes; Tawheda Begum; Afi Okaidja; Anastasia Dymitrow
- Cinematography: Hélène Louvart
- Edited by: Maya Maffioli
- Music by: Emilie Levienaise-Farrouch
- Production companies: Film4; BFI; Fable Pictures; The Wellcome Trust
- Distributed by: Altitude
- Release dates: 5 September 2019 (TIFF); 18 September 2020 (United Kingdom)
- Running time: 93 minutes
- Country: United Kingdom
- Language: English
- Budget: $3.9 million
- Box office: $598,859

Rocks is a 2019 British coming-of-age drama film directed by Sarah Gavron. The film stars Bukky Bakray as Olushola, nicknamed "Rocks", a Black British teenage girl living in Hackney, London, whose single mother abandons her and her younger brother Emmanuel (D’angelou Osei Kissiedu), forcing them to try to avoid being taken into social services.

Rocks premiered at the 2019 Toronto International Film Festival and was released in the United Kingdom on 18 September 2020. The film received acclaim from critics, and was nominated for seven awards at the 74th British Academy Film Awards, including Outstanding British Film and Best Actress in a Leading Role for Bakray, making her one of the youngest nominees for the award. Nineteen-year-old Bukky Bakray also received BAFTA Rising Star Award, becoming the youngest winner in the category.

== Plot ==
Rocks is a teenage girl who lives in London with her younger brother, Emmanuel, and their single mother. She has a tight-knit group of friends. A troublesome new girl, Roché, arrives at Rocks’ school and takes a liking to her, much to the chagrin of Rocks’ friends.

One day, Rocks’ mother leaves, leaving behind only a letter promising that she will return and an envelope containing an insufficient amount of money. Rocks is reluctant to tell anybody about her situation, only notifying her closest friend, Sumaya.

On the way home from school, Rocks notices a social worker outside of her home and asks that Sumaya’s family let her and Emmanuel stay for the night. At Sumaya’s house, Rocks and Sumaya have an argument after Sumaya suggests that Rocks tell an adult about her situation; Rocks expresses her resentment at Sumaya for having a nice house and a big family, and angrily assures Sumaya that she doesn’t need her.

Rocks becomes distant from her friends and begins to spend more time with Roshé. While skipping school with Roshé one day, Rocks learns that Roshé has been making money by committing fraud via recording the credit card information of the clients at her step-mom’s salon. While Roshé is not looking, Rocks steals from her and uses the money to pay for a hotel room for the night, lying to the owner that she is Emmanuel’s mother.

Roshé eventually realizes that Rocks stole her money and makes a post online wherein she dubs Rocks a thief whose mother left her, thus notifying the student body of Rocks’ situation. Rocks and Emmanuel are kicked out by the staff at the hotel after they realize that she is a minor. Having nowhere else to go, Rocks decides to stay the night at her friend Agnes’ house.

The next morning Rocks wakes to find Emmanuel being taken away by social workers; Agnes had told her mother about the situation, and she subsequently notified authorities. Rocks reluctantly agrees to be taken by them, along with Emmanuel.

Rocks is placed in a foster home in London, while Emmanuel is placed in a home in Hastings. Rocks reconciles with her friends, who all come up with the money needed to take a train ride to Hastings so that Rocks can see Emmanuel for his birthday. However, once there, Rocks sees how happy Emmanuel is, and doesn’t have the heart to call out to him. The film ends with the girls playing on the beach.

== Cast ==
- Bukky Bakray as Olushola "Rocks" Omotoso
- Kosar Ali as Sumaya
- D'angelou Osei Kissiedu as Emmanuel Omotoso
- Shaneigha-Monik Greyson as Roshé
- Ruby Stokes as Agnes
- Tawheda Begum as Khadijah
- Afi Okaidja as Yawa
- Anastasia Dymitrow as Sabina
- Sarah Niles as Ms. Booker
- Layo-Christina Akinlude as Funke Omotoso
- Sharon D. Clarke as Anita
- Joanna Brookes as Geraldine
- Angelica Nicole Cabutotan as Angela
- Kaine Zajaz as Mo
- Brie-Morgan Appleton as Natasha
- Ashley Merino Bastidas as Micaela
- Mohammad Amiri as Mohammed
- Islah Abdur-Rahman as Ismail
- Shola Adewusi as Grandmother Omotoso (voice)

== Production ==
The film was shot around East London in summer 2018. Locations include Ridley Road market.

The crew consisted of 75% women, and director Sarah Gavron cast almost exclusively non-professional actors from the local area.

== Release ==
The film premiered at the 2019 Toronto International Film Festival in the Platform Prize program.

== Reception ==
On review aggregator Rotten Tomatoes, Rocks holds an approval rating of 97% based on 64 reviews, with an average rating of 8.6/10. The website's critical consensus reads: "A fresh, funny coming-of-age story rooted in realistic characters and anchored with a meaningful message, Rocks is as solid as its title suggests." According to Metacritic, which assigned a weighted average score of 96 out of 100 based on 14 critics, the film received "universal acclaim".

Peter Bradshaw of The Guardian gave it five stars, praising the film's poignancy and tragedy, and stating, "society will probably not find a way to tap this resource. When the class is taught about Picasso and cubism and they make spoof Picasso cut-out images of people's faces cut from magazines, it is a funny moment, but serious too, because there is a real sense of potential. This film is such a rush of vitality. It rocks." Writing for The Telegraph, Robbie Collins also gave the film five stars, saying: "Rocks would rather reckon with – and in the end, celebrate – youthful potential itself, and its extraordinary ability to flower in even the most unpromising soil." The Independent gave it four stars, saying, "Rocks is a heartfelt testament to the resilience of teenage girls."

=== Accolades ===
At the 74th British Academy Film Awards, Rocks earned 7 nominations, tied with Nomadland for the most of the ceremony.

Rocks won the Jury Prize in International Competition at the 2020 Brussels International Film Festival (BRIFF), ex aequo with Favolacce (Bad Tales).

Award	Date of ceremony	Category	Recipient(s)	Result	Ref.
British Independent Film Awards	18 February 2021	Best British Independent Film	Sarah Gavron, Ameenah Ayub Allen, Faye Ward, Theresa Ikoko and Claire Wilson	Won	
British Independent Film Awards	18 February 2021	Best Director	Sarah Gavron	Nominated	
British Independent Film Awards	18 February 2021	Best Performance by an Actress	Bukky Bakray	Nominated	
British Independent Film Awards	18 February 2021	Best Supporting Actor	D’angelou Osei Kissiedu	Won	
British Independent Film Awards	18 February 2021	Best Supporting Actress	Kosar Ali	Won	
British Independent Film Awards	18 February 2021	Best Screenplay	Theresa Ikoko and Claire Wilson	Nominated	
British Independent Film Awards	18 February 2021	Most Promising Newcomer	Kosar Ali	Won	
British Independent Film Awards	18 February 2021	Most Promising Newcomer	Bukky Bakray	Nominated	
British Independent Film Awards	18 February 2021	Best Debut Screenwriter	Theresa Ikoko and Claire Wilson	Nominated	
British Independent Film Awards	18 February 2021	Best Casting	Lucy Pardee	Won	
British Independent Film Awards	18 February 2021	Best Costume Design	Ruka Johnson	Nominated	
British Independent Film Awards	18 February 2021	Best Editing	Maya Maffioli	Nominated	
British Independent Film Awards	18 February 2021	Best Makeup & Hair Design	Nora Robertson	Nominated	
British Independent Film Awards	18 February 2021	Best Music	Connie Farr and Emilie Levienaise-Farrouch	Nominated	
British Academy Film Awards	11 April 2021	Best Direction	Sarah Gavron	Nominated	
British Academy Film Awards	11 April 2021	Best Actress in a Leading Role	Bukky Bakray	Nominated	
British Academy Film Awards	11 April 2021	Best Actress in a Supporting Role	Kosar Ali	Nominated	
British Academy Film Awards	11 April 2021	Best Original Screenplay	Theresa Ikoko and Claire Wilson	Nominated	
British Academy Film Awards	11 April 2021	Outstanding Debut by a British Writer, Director or Producer	Theresa Ikoko and Claire Wilson	Nominated	
British Academy Film Awards	11 April 2021	Best Casting	Lucy Pardee	Won	
British Academy Film Awards	11 April 2021	Outstanding British Film	Sarah Gavron, Ameenah Ayub Allen, Faye Ward, Theresa Ikoko, and Claire Wilson	Nominated	
Writers' Guild of Great Britain	14 February 2022	Best First Screenplay	Rocks by Theresa Ikoko and Claire Wilson	Nominated	

== See also ==
- London in film
