= Bukky Bakray =

British actress

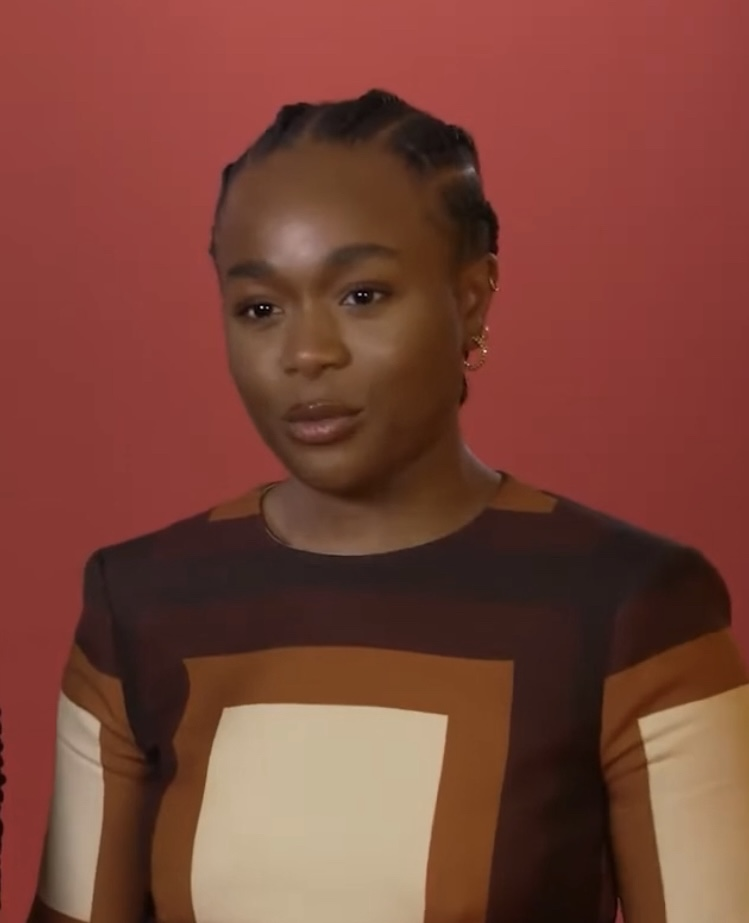
- Bakray at the British Independent Film Awards 2021
- Born: 2002 (age 23–24); Hackney, London, England
- Occupation: Actress
- Years active: 2019–present
- Known for: Rocks (2019), You Don't Know Me (2022)
- Awards: BAFTA Rising Star Award (2021)

Bukky Bakray (born 2002) is a British actress. She is known for her debut role in the film Rocks (2019). At 18, she became the youngest BAFTA Rising Star Award recipient as well as one of the youngest Best Actress in a Leading Role nominees. She appeared on the 2021 Forbes 30 Under 30 list.

== Early life and education ==
Bakray was born around 2002 in Hackney, east London to Christian Nigerian parents. She grew up on an estate in Lower Clapton, near where Rocks was filmed. She has three brothers and a sister who lives in South Africa. She attended Clapton Girls' Academy and Cardinal Pole Catholic School.

Bakray joined the RADA Youth Company and enrolled in the Originate Actor Training programme at Theatre Peckham.

== Career ==
Bakray was discovered at school when she was 15 by director Sarah Gavron, who cast Bakray in the titular role of her film Rocks. Bakray became the youngest EE Rising Star Award winner and one of the youngest nominees for the BAFTA Award for Best Actress in a Leading Role.

In 2021, Bakray made her television debut as Bless in the BBC One series You Don't Know Me. She also wrote an essay for the collection Black Joy. This was followed in 2023 by roles as Kim in the Apple TV+ series Liaison and Dione in the Netflix horror film The Strays with Ashley Madekwe. Also in 2023, Bakray starred in Sleepova at the Bush Theatre.

Bakray has an upcoming role in the film Self-Charm directed by Ella Greenwood.

== Acting credits ==
Key
†	Denotes works that have not yet been released

=== Film ===
Year	Title	Role	Notes
2019	Rocks	Olushola "Rocks" Omotoso	Debut role
2021	The Gospel According to Gail	Mia	Short film
2023	The Strays	Abigial "Abby" / Dione Clark	
2027	Children of Blood and Bone †	Binta	Post-production

=== Television ===
Year	Title	Role	Notes
2021	You Don't Know Me	Blessing/Bless	
2023	Liaison	Kim	

=== Stage ===
Year	Title	Role	Notes
2022	Living Newspaper Edition 4	Ensemble	Royal Court Theatre, London
2023	Sleepova	Funmi	Bush Theatre, London

== Bibliography ==
- Essay in Black Joy, edited by Charlie Brinkhurst-Cuff and Timi Sotire (2021)

== Accolades ==
Year	Award	Category	Work	Result	Ref
2021	London Critics' Circle Film Awards	British/Irish Actress of the Year	Rocks	Nominated	
2021	London Critics' Circle Film Awards	Young British/Irish Performer	Rocks	Won	
2021	British Independent Film Awards	Best Actress	Rocks	Nominated	
2021	British Independent Film Awards	Most Promising Newcomer	Rocks	Nominated	
2021	British Academy Film Awards	Best Actress in a Leading Role	Rocks	Nominated	
2021	British Academy Film Awards	Rising Star Award	Herself	Won	
2023	The Stage Debut Awards	Best Performer in a Play	Sleepova	Nominated	

== See also ==
- List of British actors
