= Polite Society (film) =

2023 British film by Nida Manzoor

- Theatrical release poster
- Directed by: Nida Manzoor
- Written by: Nida Manzoor
- Produced by: Tim Bevan; Eric Fellner; Olivier Kaempfer; John Pocock
- Starring: Priya Kansara; Ritu Arya
- Cinematography: Ashley Connor
- Edited by: Robbie Morrison
- Music by: Tom Howe; Shez Manzoor
- Production companies: Focus Features; Working Title Films; Parkville Pictures
- Distributed by: Universal Pictures
- Release dates: 21 January 2023 (Sundance); 28 April 2023 (United Kingdom)
- Running time: 104 minutes
- Country: United Kingdom
- Language: English
- Box office: $2.7 million

Polite Society is a 2023 British martial arts action comedy film written and directed by Nida Manzoor (in her feature film directorial debut). The film stars Priya Kansara, Ritu Arya, Nimra Bucha, Akshay Khanna, Seraphina Beh, Ella Bruccoleri, Shona Babayemi, Shobu Kapoor, and Jeff Mirza.

The film follows teenager Ria Khan, who struggles to save her older sister, Lena, after she decides to give up on her dreams and get married.

Polite Society had its world premiere at the 2023 Sundance Film Festival on 21 January 2023, and was released in the United Kingdom and the United States on 28 April 2023 by Universal Pictures. The film received positive reviews from critics.

== Plot ==
In London, British-Pakistani teen Ria Khan aspires to become a movie stunt performer like her idol, Eunice Huthart. Under an alter ego, "the Fury", Ria creates films of martial arts training with the help of her older sister, Lena, who has dropped out of art school and moved back in with their loving but traditional parents, Fatima and Rafe, both of them discouraging Ria's dreams.

At school, Ria is inseparable from her friends Clara and Alba, but their disapproving teacher urges her to pursue a more "serious" career. Ria's emails to Eunice about a potential mentorship go unanswered, and she is soundly defeated by the school bully Kovacs. The Khan family is invited to an Eid soirée by Raheela, the leader of Fatima's social circle of Pakistani mothers, at her lavish mansion. Ria realizes the party has been arranged to find a suitable match for Raheela's son Salim, a successful geneticist, but is unable to stop Lena from agreeing to a date.

To Ria's horror, Lena is charmed by Salim and, after a few whirlwind weeks of dating, agrees to marry him and move to Singapore. Despite their parents' support, Ria's refusal to accept Lena's choices, including abandoning her art career, drives the sisters apart. Convinced there must be a more sinister explanation, Ria enlists Clara and Alba's help to spy on Salim. They concoct an elaborate plan to steal his laptop, and Ria distracts him while her friends hack his computer, but they find nothing incriminating.

Desperate to sabotage Lena's relationship, Ria lashes out at her friends, and breaks into Salim's bedroom to plant used condoms. She is caught, and confronts Salim with a lovey-dovey picture showing him together with a pretty girl, whom he explains is his first wife who died in childbirth. Furious, Lena berates Ria, telling her to give up the fantasies that she will change her mind about the marriage or that Ria will ever become a stuntwoman.

At odds with her sister and ignored by her friends, Ria gives up martial arts. She visits Raheela to apologize and is dragged into joining her spa day, where Raheela reveals her true colors and tortures Ria with waxing. Fighting off Raheela's staff, Ria stumbles into the mansion's secret lab and discovers that all the eligible women at the Eid party were secretly scanned and tested, and Lena was selected for her fertility and strong uterus.

Escaping back home, Ria realizes she cannot convince her family of the truth. She tells Clara and Alba, and together they devise a plan, persuading Kovacs to drive them to the wedding to rescue Lena. Ria distracts the guests with a spectacular Filmi (Bollywood-style) dance ("Maar Dala") while Clara and Alba, disguised as waiters, sneak past the armed guard at Lena's door. They chloroform Lena and hide her inside a tea trolley, but Raheela captures Ria, and reveals she and Salim plan to impregnate Lena with a clone of Raheela.

Forced to return Lena, the friends are locked in the bridal suite as the wedding begins, but Kovacs comes to their rescue and subdues the guard. Taking his gun, Ria holds Raheela at gunpoint and exposes her plan, leading Lena to remember being drugged and tested by Salim, who admits that his first wife died carrying his mother’s clone. Raheela seizes the gun but is disarmed by Fatima, as Ria’s family and friends fight off the guests and Raheela's staff.

Lena subdues Salim while Ria finally masters a reverse spinning kick to defeat Raheela, and the police arrive as the sisters drive off. Reconciling with Lena, Ria finally receives an encouraging email from Eunice, and the sisters celebrate together.

== Cast ==
- Priya Kansara as Ria Khan / The Fury, a teenage martial arts enthusiast aspiring to be a stuntwoman
- Ritu Arya as Lena Khan, Ria's older sister
- Nimra Bucha as Raheela Shah, a family friend of Fatima who sets up Lena and Salim
- Akshay Khanna as Salim Shah, Raheela's son and Lena's fiancé
- Seraphina Beh as Clara, Ria's friend
- Ella Bruccoleri as Alba, Ria's friend
- Shona Babayemi as Kovacs, Ria's bully
- Shobu Kapoor as Fatima Khan, Ria and Lena's mother
- Jeff Mirza as Rafe Khan, Ria and Lena's father
- Sally Ann as Edith, a mean girl at Ria's school
- Eunice Huthart as Herself (voice/archive images), Ria's stuntwoman idol

== Production ==
In January 2022, it was revealed that director Nida Manzoor was working on a feminist martial arts action/comedy film focussing on two privately educated British-Pakistani sisters in London. The film is by Working Title, Focus Features and Parkville Pictures, and has a tone and voice similar to Manzoor’s breakthrough and BAFTA, Peabody, and Rose d'Or award winning sitcom series We Are Lady Parts.

In February 2022 it was announced that filming had wrapped on the project in London. It is produced by Tim Bevan and Eric Fellner for Working Title with Olivier Kaempfer and John Pocock for Parkville Pictures. Focus Features had distribution rights.

The typography & graphic design for the title card, credits, chapter headings and fight sequence introductions was designed by Peter Anderson Studio.

=== Genre and influences ===
While the structure of Polite Society does not adhere to a specific genre throughout, Manzoor has described portions of it as "a joyful kung fu Bollywood epic". Mansoor also drew from spaghetti westerns, All About Eve, Hong Kong kung-fu films, and the work of Yuen Woo-ping. Additional influences include the 2002 version of Devdas (Ria's dances to Maar Dala at the wedding), the novels of Jane Austen, Jackie Chan, Aishwarya Rai Bachchan, Get Out, Kill Bill (Quentin Tarantino), Mira Nair, Deepa Mehta, and The Slums of Beverly Hills.

== Release ==
Polite Society was released at the 2023 Sundance Film Festival on 21 January 2023, at the 2023 Glasgow Film Festival on 12 March 2023, and was released in the United Kingdom and the United States on 28 April 2023.

== Reception ==
On the review aggregator Rotten Tomatoes, the film has an approval rating of 91% based on 176 reviews. The website's critics' consensus reads, "Polite Society throws, kicks, and punches the genre etiquette book out the window to deliver a fun film that blends Bollywood splendor and British wryness." On Metacritic, the film has a weighted average score of 75 out of 100, based on 32 critics, indicating "generally favorable reviews".

Robbie Collin in the Daily Telegraph described it as “rollicking” and “crafty and fresh” and “all done with infectious pep”, with “the fights themselves – witty, lucid, crunchy, slick” and Kansara a “blatant star-in-the-making”.

BBC Culture's Mohammad Zaheer gave it four stars and wrote that the film was "an action-packed, genre-blending delight that fires on all cylinders" and that "[e]verything – from the writing to the cinematography, the performances, the choreography and the soundtrack – is on point, and it has all the requisite ingredients to be an exhilarating experience for audiences that come along for the ride." He also praised the lack of stereotypes regarding Lena's engagement to Salim.

In The Guardian, Peter Bradshaw mentioned Manzoor as one of the best debuts in film in 2023.

Former U.S. President Barack Obama named "Polite Society" one of his favorite movies of 2023.

=== Accolades ===
Manzoor won in the Best Debut Screenwriter category at the 2023 British Independent Film Awards. Also nominated were Priya Kansara in the Breakthrough Performance category, Ritu Arya for Best Supporting Performance, Claire Carter for Best Hair & Make Up, and Paddy Eason for Best Effects.

== See also ==
- List of female action heroes and villains
