= Juliette Motamed =

- Born: Sweden
- Other name: AZADI.mp3
- Education: University of Bristol
- Occupations: Musician; actress
- Years active: 2018–present
- Musical career
- Genres: Pop punk; riot grrrl; futurepop; drum and bass; electronic
- Instruments: Vocals

Juliette Motamed is a British actress and musician. She makes music and DJs under the moniker AZADI.mp3. On television, she is known for her role in the Channel 4 sitcom We Are Lady Parts (2021–2024). Her films include Magic Mike's Last Dance (2023).

== Early life and education ==
Motamed was born to Iranian parents and moved from Sweden to England at one year old. She grew up in North London.

Motamed studied English at University of Bristol and graduated in 2016. Her final-year dissertation was titled, “America never was America to me: Exploring the relationship between Claudia Rankine’s ‘Citizen’, Kendrick Lamar’s ‘To Pimp a Butterfly’ and contemporaneous activism”. As a student, Motamed was a contributor to the online magazine Gal-dem (which ceased publication in 2023).

== Career ==
=== Acting ===
In 2019, Motamed starred in the short film Pagans.

Having appeared in Nida Manzoor's 2018 comedy short Lady Parts, Motamed reprised her role as punk drummer Ayesha in the Channel 4 sitcom We Are Lady Parts in 2021, marking her television debut. She reprised the role in the sitcom's second series.

Motamed made her feature film debut as dancer Hannah in the 2023 comedy-drama Magic Mike's Last Dance, the third and final instalment in the Magic Mike trilogy with Channing Tatum and Salma Hayek.

=== Music ===
As Azadi.mp3, Motamed released two singles, "Who is" and "Aphrodite", on 8 January 2019. Working with NTS Radio's WIP artist development programme, Motamed released her conceptual three-track debut EP, Summer in the Crypt, later that year.

In 2021, Motamed released the single "NAZAR". The following year, she took part in Radio Alhara's Sonic Liberation Front stream held in protest of the death of Mahsa Amini.

In 2023, Azadi.mp3 featured in the inaugural Another Sky Festival for SWANA artists and on Intended Consequence, a compilation of electronic music by Iranian women and non-binary people. Her contribution to the collection, "Empty Platform", was noted for sampling protest chants mixed in with heavy percussive beats.

In 2024, Azadi.mp3 released an EP entitled Control, which was positively reviewed. The Clash magazine described the record as "technically skilful" and "emotionally impactful", praising Motamed's ability to "merg[e] aspects of their heritage with a desire for free-thinking musicality". Metal characterised the EP as "a frenetic, challenging, yet ultimately mesmerising voyage through the artist's psyche of cultural identity and late-stage capitalist anxieties".

Motamed released another EP, Note to Self in 2025, pledging to donate all proceeds from record sales as well as merchandise to The Sameer Project, a charity providing aids in Gaza, Palestine.

On the side, Motamed gives Ableton lessons.

== Artistry ==
Motamed grew up listening to Googoosh, Mohammad-Reza Shajarian, Aqua, and Missy Elliott. She has named Googoosh as well as the likes of My Chemical Romance, Aphex Twin, Imogen Heap, and Earl Sweatshirt as her influences.

== Filmography ==
=== Film ===
Year	Title	Role	Notes
2018	The Fence	Asha	Short film
2018	Lady Parts	Ayesha	Short film
2019	Pagans	Juliette	Short film
2023	Magic Mike's Last Dance	Hannah	

=== Television ===
Year	Title	Role	Notes
2021–present	We Are Lady Parts	Ayesha	Main role
2022	Ellie & Natasia		1 episode
2023	Maneater	Zoe	Television film
2023	Sky Comedy Shorts	Sonja	Episode: "Past Caring"
2024	Halo	Carina	3 episodes
2024	The Completely Made-Up Adventures of Dick Turpin	Abigail	Episode: "The Unrobbable Coach"
2025	Grace	Vee Wilde	Series 5
2026	Amandaland	Ellie	Episode: Vantablack Coffee
TBA	Tomb Raider †	TBA	Filming

=== Stage ===
Year	Title	Role	Venue(s)/Production	Notes
2024	Wish You Were Here by Sanaz Toossi	Rana	Theatro Technis, produced by Gate Theatre	Stage debut

== Discography ==
=== Extended Plays ===
- Summer in the Crypt (2019)
- Control (2024)
- Note to Self (2025)

=== Singles ===
- "Who Is" (2019)
- "Aphrodite" (2019)
- "NAZAR" (2021)
