= British Independent Film Award for Best Effects =

Film awards

- Awarded for: Best Effects
- Country: United Kingdom
- Presented by: BIFA
- First award: 2017
- Currently held by: Civil War – David Simpson (2024)
- Website: www.bifa.org.uk

The British Independent Film Award for Best Effects is an annual award given by the British Independent Film Awards (BIFA) to recognize the best effects in a British independent film. The award was first presented in the 2017 ceremony.

Prior to 2017, visual effects were included in the category Best Technical Achievement alongside different areas of crafts in film, this category was presented from 2001 to 2016.

== Winners and nominees ==
=== 2010s ===
Year	Film	Recipient(s)
2017 (20th)	The Ritual	Nick Allder and Ben White
2017 (20th)	The Death of Stalin	Ronald Grauer and Bernard Newton
2017 (20th)	Double Date	Dan Martin
2017 (20th)	Journeyman	Luke Dodd
2017 (20th)	Their Finest	Chris Reynolds
2018 (21st)	Early Man	Howard Jones
2018 (21st)	Dead in a Week (Or Your Money Back)	Matthew Strange and Mark Wellband
2018 (21st)	Peterloo	George Zwier and Paul Driver
2019 (22nd)	A Shaun the Sheep Movie: Farmageddon	Howard Jones
2019 (22nd)	The Boy Who Harnessed the Wind	Andy Quinn
2019 (22nd)	In Fabric	Paul Mann

=== 2020s ===
Year	Film	Recipient(s)
2020 (23rd)	His House	Pedro Sabrosa and Stefano Pepin
2020 (23rd)	Saint Maud	Scott MacIntyre, Bariş Kareli and Kristyan Mallet
2020 (23rd)	Underdogs	Agnes Asplund and Martin Malmqvist
2021 (24th)	DASHCAM	Steven Bray and Mike Knights
2021 (24th)	Censor	Gary Brown, István Molnár and Dan Martin
2021 (24th)	The Electrical Life of Louis Wain	Rupert Davies
2022 (25th)	Men	Dadiv Simpson
2022 (25th)	The Feast	Chris Marshall
2022 (25th)	Nezouh	Ahmed Yousry
2023 (26th)	The Kitchen	Jonathan Gales and Richard Baker
2023 (26th)	The End We Start From	Theodor Flo-Groeneboom
2023 (26th)	Polite Society	Paddy Eason
2024 (27th)	Civil War	David Simpson
2024 (27th)	Lee	Glen McGuigan and Ingo Putze
2024 (27th)	Love Lies Bleeding	James Allen
