= Josef Davies =

English actor

- Education: London Academy of Music and Dramatic Art
- Occupation: Actor
- Years active: 2015 –present

Josef Davies is a British stage, television and film actor. Among his numerous roles, he played Sören in television series Young Wallander (2020–2022) and Sergei Nikulov in Star City (TV series) (2026).

== Career ==
=== Stage ===
He trained at the London Academy of Music and Dramatic Art and graduated in 2015. He made his professional debut as Hennessy in the original cast of the Martin McDonagh play Hangmen at the Royal Court Theatre. In 2016, he appeared in a production of The 306: Dawn by Oliver Emanuel, in Perthshire.

In 2021, he appeared in Samuel Bailey play Shook at the Southwark Playhouse. In 2022, he appeared in Ravenscourt at the Hampstead Theatre. In 2023, he acted in the West End in the Peter Morgan play Patriots at the Noël Coward Theatre, portraying Alexander Litvinenko, opposite Stefanie Martini as his wife, Martina.

=== Film and television ===
His early television roles included historical drama Chernobyl (2019), the 2019 British television series Curfew and long-running BBC One historical drama series Call the Midwife. He had a series regular role as Sören in Young Wallander on Netflix in 2021. He played Chris Brown in the ITV drama series The Hunt for Raoul Moat in 2023.

His film roles include 1917, Dumbo, and The King. He played a prison inmate in the first season of Andor, the Star Wars: Rogue One prequel series for Disney+.

In 2025, he was a guest star on the fifth series of Grace for ITV. He has an upcoming role in 2025 Agatha Christie adaptation The Seven Dials Mystery for Netflix. In February 2025, he was cast in For All Mankind spin-off Star City for Apple TV+.

== Filmography ==
=== Film ===
Year	Title	Role	Notes
2019	Dumbo	Dreamland Security Guard	
2019	The King	Beale	
2019	1917	Private Stokes	

=== Television ===
Year	Title	Role	Notes
2018	Call the Midwife	Allan	1 episode
2019	Silent Witness	Les	2 episodes
2019	Curfew	Ewan	1 episode
2019	Chernobyl	Janek	Miniseries, 1 episode
2019	World on Fire	Henry	1 episode
2019	The Crown	Christine's boyfriend	1 episode
2020–2022	Young Wallander	Soren	Main role, 12 episodes
2022	This is Going to Hurt	Medieval Costume Man	Miniseries, 1 episode
2022	Andor	Xaul	3 episodes
2025	Grace	Danny Starr	1 episode
2026	Agatha Christie's Seven Dials	Alfred	Miniseries, 2 episodes
2026	Star City	Sergei Nikulov	8 episodes
