= Vera (TV series) =

British crime drama television series (2011–2025)

- Genre: Crime drama; Mystery
- Created by: Ann Cleeves
- Starring: Brenda Blethyn; David Leon; Jon Morrison; Riley Jones; Wunmi Mosaku; Paul Ritter; Cush Jumbo; Sonya Cassidy; Clare Calbraith; Kingsley Ben-Adir; Kenny Doughty; Lisa Hammond; Noof McEwan; Christopher Colquhoun; Steve Evets; Ibinabo Jack; Paul Kaye; Sarah Kameela Impey; Rhiannon Clements; Shobna Gulati; Marley Emma Sage; Stevie Raine
- Composer: Ben Bartlett
- Country of origin: United Kingdom
- Original language: English
- No. of series: 14
- No. of episodes: 56 (list of episodes)

Production
- Executive producers: Elaine Collins; Kate Bartlett; Kate Lewis; Myar Craig-Brown; Michael Dawson; Will Nicholson; Letitia Knight
- Producers: Elaine Collins; Elwan Rowlands; Margaret Mitchell; Debbie Shewell; Letitia Knight
- Running time: 89–91 minutes
- Production companies: ITV Studios (2011–2017); Silverprint Pictures (2018–2025)

Original release
- Network: ITV
- Release: 1 May 2011 – 3 January 2025

Vera is a British crime drama television series based on the Vera Stanhope novels by Ann Cleeves. It ran on ITV for 14 years from 1 May 2011 until 3 January 2025 and starred Brenda Blethyn as the principal character, Detective Chief Inspector Vera Stanhope.

== Premise ==
Vera is a nearly retired detective chief inspector of the fictional Northumberland & City Police, who is obsessive about her work. She plods along in a dishevelled state but has a calculating mind and despite her irascible personality, she cares deeply about her work and colleagues. She often proves her superior skills by picking up small errors in her team members' thought processes. Vera forms a close relationship with sergeants Joe Ashworth and Aiden Healy.

== Production ==
The series is filmed in Newcastle upon Tyne and throughout Northumberland, County Durham and North Yorkshire in North East England. Locations include Hartlepool, Gateshead, South Shields, North Shields, Whitley Bay, Amble, Warkworth, Alnmouth, Bamburgh, and Holy Island. The farmhouse used for the exterior shots of Vera's home is located on the Snook, part of Holy Island at 55°41′10″N 001°50′29″W or grid reference NU1006543635.

"Hidden Depths", "Telling Tales" and "The Crow Trap" from the first series, as well as "Silent Voices" from the second series, are based on novels of the same names by Ann Cleeves. The episode "Sand Dancers" from the second series was due to be broadcast on 13 May 2012. However, the episode was pulled from the schedule as its storyline was about a soldier's death in Afghanistan and it coincided with news of two servicemen dying there.

In August 2012, Vera was renewed for a third series of four episodes, with both Brenda Blethyn and David Leon confirmed as returning for the new series. On 5 June 2014, ITV announced that a fifth series had been commissioned but that David Leon would not be returning. Kenny Doughty was unveiled as his successor. Letitia Knight was announced as executive producer for this series. Cush Jumbo returned to the main cast following her two-episode guest stint in series two, while Lisa Hammond joined the cast as newcomer Helen Milton.

In March 2015, ITV announced that the show had been renewed for a sixth series, with filming commencing in June. The third episode was announced to be an adaptation of the novel The Moth Catcher, which was set to be published in September 2015. Noof McEwan joined the cast following the departure of Cush Jumbo. On 14 January 2020, while attending the TCA Press Tour, Blethyn confirmed that Vera was renewed for an eleventh series. Production for series 11 began in April 2020 and new episodes began airing in 2021. In March 2023, ITV announced that the show had been renewed for a thirteenth series, with filming commencing in mid-May. It aired in January 2024 and featured the return of Joe Ashworth, as well as former Hollyoaks actress Rhiannon Clements as DC Stephanie Duncan.

The fourteenth and final series comprised the final two episodes and aired in January 2025.

== Cast ==
- Brenda Blethyn as DCI Vera Stanhope
- David Leon as DS (later DI) Joe Ashworth
- Jon Morrison as DC Kenny Lockhart
- Wunmi Mosaku as DC Holly Lawson
- Paul Ritter as Dr Billy Cartwright
- Cush Jumbo as DC Bethany Whelan
- Sonya Cassidy as Celine Ashworth
- Riley Jones as PC (later DC) Mark Edwards
- Clare Calbraith as DC Rebecca Shepherd
- Kingsley Ben-Adir as Dr. Marcus Sumner
- Kenny Doughty as DS Aiden Healy
- Lisa Hammond as IO Helen Milton
- Noof McEwan as DC Hicham Cherradi
- Christopher Colquhoun as Dr. Anthony Carmichael
- Steve Evets as PC George Wooten
- Ibinabo Jack as DC Jacqueline Williams
- Paul Kaye as Dr Malcolm Donahue
- Sarah Kameela Impey as Dr Paula Bennett
- Rhiannon Clements as DC Stephanie Duncan
- Shobna Gulati as Chief Superintendent Khalon
- Marley Emma Sage as Young Vera Stanhope
- Stevie Raine as Hector Stanhope

=== Timeline ===
Cast Members	Series													
Cast Members	1	2	3	4	5	6	7	8	9	10	11	12	13	14
Brenda Blethyn as DCI Vera Stanhope	Main	Main	Main	Main	Main	Main	Main	Main	Main	Main	Main	Main	Main	Main
David Leon as DS Joe Ashworth	Main	Main	Main	Main									Main	Main
Jon Morrison as DC Kenny Lockhart	Main	Main	Main	Main	Main	Main	Main	Main	Main	Main	Main	Main	Main	Main
Wunmi Mosaku as DC Holly Lawson	Main	Main												
Paul Ritter as Dr Billy Cartwright	Main	Main	Main											
Sonya Cassidy as Celine Ashworth		Recurring	Recurring	Recurring										
Cush Jumbo as DC Bethany Whelan		Main			Main	Main								
Riley Jones as DC Mark Edwards	Guest	Guest	Main	Main	Main	Main	Main	Main	Main	Main	Main	Main	Main	Main
Clare Calbraith as DC Rebecca Shepherd		Guest	Main	Main										
Kingsley Ben-Adir as Dr Marcus Sumner				Main	Main	Main		Main						
Cast Members	Series													
Cast Members	1	2	3	4	5	6	7	8	9	10	11	12	13	14
Kenny Doughty as DS Aiden Healy					Main	Main	Main	Main	Main	Main	Main	Main		
Lisa Hammond as IO Helen Milton					Main	Main	Main							
Noof McEwan as DC Hicham Cherradi						Main	Main							
Christopher Colquhoun as Dr. Anthony Carmichael							Main							
Steve Evets as PC George Wooten							Recurring	Recurring	Recurring					
Ibinabo Jack as DC Jacqueline Williams								Main	Main	Main	Main	Main		
Paul Kaye as Dr. Malcolm Donahue									Main	Main	Main	Main		
Sarah Kameela Impey as Dr. Paula Bennett												Main	Main	Main
Rhiannon Clements as DC Steph Duncan													Main	Main
Shobna Gulati as Chief Superintendent Khalon														Guest

== Episodes ==
Series	Episodes		Originally released		Average UK viewers (millions)
Series	Episodes		First released	Last released	Average UK viewers (millions)
1	4		1 May 2011	22 May 2011	6.60
2	4		22 April 2012	3 June 2012	6.37
3	4		25 August 2013	15 September 2013	6.53
4	4		27 April 2014	18 May 2014	6.42
5	4		5 April 2015	26 April 2015	6.19
6	4		31 January 2016	21 February 2016	7.88
7	4		19 March 2017	9 April 2017	8.07
8	4		7 January 2018	28 January 2018	9.03
9	4		13 January 2019	3 February 2019	8.48
10	4		12 January 2020	2 February 2020	8.30
11	6		29 August 2021	22 January 2023	6.97
12	5	4	29 January 2023	19 February 2023	6.02
12	5	1	26 December 2023		5.71
13	3		7 January 2024	21 January 2024	6.66
14	2		1 January 2025	2 January 2025	6.24
Special			3 January 2025		3.11

== Home releases ==
Series	Format	Release date			
Series	Format	Region 1	Region 2 (UK)	Region 2 (Germany)	Region 4/B
1	DVD (individual series sets)	30 August 2011	23 May 2011	4 April 2014	9 August 2012
2	DVD (individual series sets)	6 November 2012	21 May 2012	24 July 2015	3 December 2014
3	DVD (individual series sets)	28 January 2014	16 September 2013	4 September 2015	3 December 2014
4	DVD (individual series sets)	28 October 2014	19 May 2014	19 February 2016	3 December 2014
5	DVD (individual series sets)	22 September 2015	11 May 2015	3 February 2017	9 September 2015
6	DVD (individual series sets)	28 June 2016	7 March 2016	2 February 2018	13 April 2016
7	DVD (individual series sets)	24 October 2017	17 April 2017	7 May 2018	13 September 2017
8	DVD (individual series sets)	4 December 2018	26 February 2018	27 September 2019	8 May 2019
9	DVD (individual series sets)	7 January 2020	25 February 2019	14 February 2020	5 August 2020
10	DVD (individual series sets)	5 January 2021	2 March 2020	TBA	4 November 2020
11	DVD (individual series sets)	TBA	27 February 2023 (Note: The eleventh series was split into three individual sets in the UK: episodes 1 and 2 were released on 27 September 2021, episodes 3 and 4 were released on 31 January 2022, while episodes 5 and 6 were released on 27 February 2023, on the same day the complete eleventh series was made available.)	TBA	31 August 2022
12	DVD (individual series sets)	TBA	20 March 2023	TBA	17 April 2024
13	DVD (individual series sets)	TBA	26 February 2024	TBA	11 September 2024
14	DVD (individual series sets)	TBA	10 February 2025	TBA	TBA
1–2	DVD (multiple series sets)	No release	13 August 2012	No release	No release
1–3	DVD (multiple series sets)	No release	16 September 2013	29 January 2021	No release
1–4	DVD (multiple series sets)	No release	25 August 2014	No release	No release
1–5	DVD (multiple series sets)	No release	5 October 2015	No release	9 September 2015
1–6	DVD (multiple series sets)	No release	No release	No release	14 September 2016 (Note: A re-release set of series 1–6 was released on 27 September 2023, which was followed by a first-ever release of a series 7–9 set in December 2023.)
4–6	DVD (multiple series sets)	No release	No release	30 September 2022	No release
1–7	DVD (multiple series sets)	23 October 2018	No release	No release	13 September 2017
1–8	DVD (multiple series sets)	No release	19 March 2018	No release	8 May 2019
1–9	DVD (multiple series sets)	No release	25 February 2019	No release	5 August 2020
7–9	DVD (multiple series sets)	No release	No release	No release	6 December 2023
1–10	DVD (multiple series sets)	No release	9 March 2020	No release	4 November 2020
1–11	DVD (multiple series sets)	No release	27 February 2023	No release	31 August 2022
1–13	DVD (multiple series sets)	No release	26 February 2024	No release	No release
1–14	DVD (multiple series sets)	No release	10 February 2025	No release	TBA
1–6	Blu-ray	No release	No release	No release	29 April 2025
