= Star City (TV series) =

2026 American science fiction series

- Genre: Alternate history; Drama; Spy thriller; Science fiction
- Created by: Ben Nedivi; Matt Wolpert; Ronald D. Moore
- Starring: Rhys Ifans; Anna Maxwell Martin; Agnes O'Casey; Alice Englert; Solly McLeod; Adam Nagaitis; Ruby Ashbourne Serkis; Josef Davies; Priya Kansara
- Music by: Federico Jusid
- Country of origin: United States
- Original language: English
- No. of seasons: 1
- No. of episodes: 8

Production
- Executive producers: Nick Murphy; Steve Oster; Andrew Chambliss; Maril Davis; Ronald D. Moore; Ben Nedivi; Matt Wolpert
- Producers: Dia Dufault; Huey M. Park
- Production locations: Vilnius, Lithuania
- Cinematography: Brendan Kuroki Uegama; Cort Fey
- Editors: Justin Bourret; Garret Donnelly; Robert Rodriguez
- Camera setup: Single-camera
- Running time: 55–65 minutes
- Production companies: Tall Ship Productions; Delicatessen Media; Sony Pictures Television

Original release
- Network: Apple TV
- Release: May 29, 2026 – present

Related
- For All Mankind

Star City is an American alternate history science fiction drama television series created by Ben Nedivi, Matt Wolpert, and Ronald D. Moore for Apple TV. It is a spin-off of For All Mankind with a focus on the Soviet Union. The name comes from the home of the Yuri Gagarin Cosmonaut Training Center, Star City. The series premiered on May 29, 2026.

== Cast ==
=== Main ===
- Rhys Ifans as Sergei Korolev, referred to as the Chief Designer, the driving force behind the Soviet space program. The character was portrayed by Endre Hules in For All Mankind.
- Anna Maxwell Martin as Lyudmilla Raskova, the head of the KGB surveillance department at Star City
- Agnes O'Casey as Irina Morozova, a recent addition to the surveillance department at Star City. The character was portrayed by Svetlana Efremova in For All Mankind.
- Alice Englert as Anastasia Belikova, an untested female cosmonaut in the Soviet space program. The character was portrayed by Rita Khrabrovitsky in For All Mankind.
- Solly McLeod as Sasha Polivanov, a reckless cosmonaut who has yet to live up to his potential
- Adam Nagaitis as Valya Mironov, a highly respected cosmonaut within the Soviet space program
- Ruby Ashbourne Serkis as Tanya Mironova, a cosmonaut's wife who struggles within the confined world of Star City
- Josef Davies as Sergei Nikulov, a young, brilliant engineer who works at Soviet Ground Control. The character was portrayed by Piotr Adamczyk in For All Mankind.
- Priya Kansara as Lakshmi Chadha, a gifted life-support system scientist and engineer from India who was invited to work at Star City

=== Recurring ===
- David Dencik as Maxim Tarasov, the deputy chairman of the Communist Party for Star City
- Eliot Salt as Vika Yegorova, Irina's colleague in the KGB transcription section
- Sam Strike as Pavel Fetisov, a cosmonaut and the Luna 17 orbiter pilot
- Ian Midlane as Mikhail, an engineer tasked for the Venus mission
- Hannah Steele as Ekaterina, an undercover western intelligence agent in Moscow
- Felix Scott as Radimir Petrovsky, the first deputy of the Second Chief Directorate of the KGB, Konstantin Filonov's second-in-command, Sergei Korolev's replacement as Chief Designer and Colonel Raskova's apparent KGB rival

=== Guest ===
- Niamh Algar as Yana Akhmatova, a cosmonaut who was trained to be the first woman on the moon
- Jenny Walser as Svetlana Leonova, the wife of cosmonaut Alexei Leonov
- Sean Gilder as Vladimir Belikov, Anastasia's father
- Jamie de Courcey as Stanislav Kalinsky, an apparatchik for the Communist Party
- Shubham Saraf as Manu Chadha, Lakshmi's husband
- Will Keen as Konstantin Filonov, the director of the KGB Second Chief Directorate and Lyudmilla's immediate Star City boss
- Sam Troughton as Andrei Stepanov, new lead engineer for Salyut 1

Additionally, Colm Feore, Chris Bauer and Dan Donohue made uncredited appearances in "The Eyes" as Wernher von Braun, Deke Slayton and Thomas O. Paine, respectively in which a clip from the NASA press conference scene in the first episode of the first season of For All Mankind was shown on Soviet television within the story.

== Episodes ==
No.	Title	Directed by	Written by	Original release date
1	"The Eyes"	Nick Murphy	Teleplay by : Ben Nedivi & Matt Wolpert; Story by : Ben Nedivi & Matt Wolpert and Ronald D. Moore	May 29, 2026
In June 1969, Svetlana Leonova is awakened in the middle of the night and learns that her husband Alexei has become the first person to walk on the moon. The Chief Designer is bestowed the Hero of the Soviet Union in a secret ceremony, but no one can know of the honor for fears that the Americans may target him. Colonel Lyudmilla Raskova, the KGB's head of surveillance at Star City, tells the Chief Designer that the Americans have acquired his lunar base plans. Raskova's team has concluded that the culprit is Yana Akhmatova, slated to be the first woman on the moon, but new operative Irina Morozova finds evidence to the contrary. Raskova takes Irina to Akhmatova and hands Irina a gun which she hands back. Raskova then shoots Akhmatova since the KGB never admits mistakes. The Soviet authorities insist that the launch go on as planned though Akhmatova's replacement, Anastasia Belikova, will only have three days to prepare for the mission. After a suit malfunction and a harrowing spacewalk, Anastasia becomes the first woman to walk on the moon. She strays from her scripted remarks before having her audio feed cut off.
2	"A Bear on a Chain"	Nick Murphy	Andrew Chambliss	May 29, 2026
The returning spacecraft with Anastasia and Valya lands several hundred miles off course in Siberia. Anastasia is given a warning by Tarasov and Raskova to follow the scripts handed to her or she would be replaced at any time. Anastasia was told that the Party expects her to attend events within the Soviet Union, meet the world press in Paris, and later marry fellow cosmonaut Sasha Polivanov. In Paris, Sasha takes Anastasia to a nightclub. A KGB agent tests Anastasia's loyalties while posing as a western intelligence agent. Raskova takes Irina to Paris to monitor the cosmonauts. Feigning the need for a translator, Raskova takes Irina to East Berlin to assist in the interrogation of a suspected western courier. While Raskova leaves the room, Irina is able to extract two new pieces of information about the courier's western contact via torture. Upon her return, Raskova reveals that she is fluent in German. Back in Star City, the Chief Designer notices that Sergei Nikulov is one of the few engineers who is able to create ingenious solutions to difficult problems on short notice. He asks Sergei to help him develop plans in secret for exploring the solar system.
3	"Bad Dancer"	Stefan Schwartz	Megan McDonnell	June 5, 2026
With evidence of Western interference mounting during the summer of 1970, Star City security has been enhanced prior to the expected launch of Luna 17, which would establish the first permanent lunar base before the Americans are able to react. To meet the new accelerated Party-imposed deadline, the engineering and training staffs have cut many corners to make it happen. Irina's and Tanya's worlds collide when it is discovered that Tanya is also Irina's daughter's music teacher during a chance meeting at the outdoor market. Concurrently, the Chief Designer and Sergei work on a secret mission to Venus. Just prior to the lander separation on Luna 17, covert western technology is detected in the lander. In an effort to disable the foreign equipment, the KGB commands Luna 17 to cycle the lander's power system, which leads to the death of cosmonaut Arseni Vetrov and aborts the mission. To compensate his wife Tanya for his long hours away from home during the Luna 17 preparations, Valya takes his wife to a Moscow piano recital, where he runs into his Western intelligence handler.
4	"Dark Forest"	Stefan Schwartz	Liba Vaynberg	June 12, 2026
For a number of years, western intelligence has been able to covertly observe Tanya's activities within a dissident group of Moscow-based musicians who have the ability to secretly import, export, and distribute banned music within the Soviet bloc. Ekaterina was able to use this information to coerce cosmonaut-candidate Valya in 1965 into working for the West against his will. Sergei and Chief Designer discover a modified Soviet part within the Luna 17 remnants. Raskova tasks Irina to a Soviet factory to discover where the modifications may have been made. Before she can retrieve records of the purchaser, a man destroys them and flees when she gives him chase. Meanwhile, Raskova is fighting with the head of the Second Chief Directorate in Moscow who is trying to push her out of the KGB. Life-support system expert Lakshmi Chadha arrives from India. Chief Designer advances his Venus plans. Sergei is imprisoned for possessing banned books. Irina makes an amazing discovery in Tanya's medicine cabinet.
5	"Bite Your Elbow"	Kasia Adamik	Gursimran Sandhu	June 19, 2026
Irina convinces Tanya that her husband is a traitor by exposing a concealed listening device and urges Tanya to leave Star City to avoid being arrested with him, while subtly interrogating Tanya further. The Chief Designer gets Sergei released from prison. Irina steals and forges an exit pass for Tanya. A jealous Vika steals a tape from Irina's desk. While Raskova reviews the tape, Irina appears with a detailed report of her infiltration of the Mironov household and how she determined that Valya to be the traitor. Raskova berates Vika and forces her to make an apology to Irina. An angry Tanya warns Valya of his imminent arrest. Unable to leave Star City, Valya knocks Pavel out and replaces him on the Venus mission. Tanya arrives at the Moscow safehouse, an opulent apartment, and is shocked to discover a family group photograph that includes a young Irina and also a prominent Soviet official. Sasha, Lakshmi, and Valya secretly launch from Baikonur as part of the Venera 7 mission.
6	"Awl in a Sack"	Kasia Adamik	George Mastras	June 26, 2026
Raskova is unable to locate either Tanya or Valya when she receives news of an unauthorized launch and confronts the Chief Designer. He confirms that Valya is on Venera 7 on his way to Venus and is shocked to find out about the treason. Tanya contacts Valya's handler in Moscow, while Irina is conducting her own investigation. Irina locates and follows the handler which leads to finding Tanya in a safe house. Tanya escapes after a confrontation. Raskova and Chief Designer (with the unwitting help of Lakshmi's husband) trap Valya in the utility module. Raskova orders Mission Control to depressurize the utility module, but the crew works together to free Valya. The Chief Designer is arrested for providing the crew with instructions to free Valya, and Raskova orders Mission Control to depressurize the whole ship. Sasha attempts to disable the remote access, but a spark ignites causing an explosion, seemingly killing all of the crew.
7	"Plow Deep"	Jamie Payne	KC Scott	July 3, 2026
Six months later, the Venera crew are presumed lost and are announced as the victims of a training accident. The Chief Designer is under house arrest, and Star City has been reoriented toward the Salyut military reconnaissance mission. When a data drop is intercepted, the authorities ask Anastasia to assume command of Salyut, to burnish its scientific credentials. (She is not pregnant, and has been working on her father's farm.) Sergei covertly explores other job options, leading to the ransacking of his apartment. Irina is asked to plant a bug in Raskova's apartment. She does, but tells her so and becomes a double agent within the KGB. Sergei has a realization after a long computation. He gets access at mission control to speak to Anastasia, and asks her to check a specific radio frequency. They find a signal that can only be, he says, from Venera.
8	"The Wolves"	Jamie Payne	Ben Nedivi & Matt Wolpert	July 10, 2026
Sasha was able to suppress the original fire, and all three proceed toward Venus. Later, Valya determines that they will miss Venus, but he unilaterally goes into the descent module, uses its engines to make the course correction, and lands on Venus, laughing briefly before the bathysphere crumples from the planet's intense atmospheric pressure. The Chief Designer computes a correction for Venera to land in Finland instead of the USSR. Sergei, through Stepanov and Anastasia, gets it through to Venera. But Irina determines that Sergei is up to something, and Raskova extracts the new plan from Sergei, by beating and threatening someone who Sergei thinks is the Chief Designer. Both are taken away. Raskova goes to the border, and an aerial missile brings the descent module down short of it. Sasha and Lakshmi flee on foot. Anastasia uses Salyut's descent module to get there as well, but after getting Lakshmi away, Sasha surrenders and both are taken away. Tanya is in Paris, watched by the KGB agent that Anastasia met there before. As Irina visits family, her daughter plays one of Tanya's banned songs on the piano.

== Production ==
The series is created for Apple TV by Ben Nedivi, Matt Wolpert and Ronald D. Moore, with Wolpert and Nedivi as showrunners and executive producers alongside Moore of Tall Ship Productions, and Steve Oster and Andrew Chambliss. Rhys Ifans is in a lead role as the Soviet's Chief Aerospace Designer with Anna Maxwell Martin as the head of the KGB surveillance team. In February 2025, Solly McLeod, Agnes O'Casey, Alice Englert, Adam Nagaitis, Josef Davies and Ruby Ashbourne Serkis joined the cast. In July, Priya Kansara joined the cast.

Filming took place in Vilnius, Lithuania, from February 2025. Filming locations included Vingis Park and Pašilaičiai.

== Release ==
Star City had its world premiere out of competition at the 2026 Canneseries. It premiered on Apple TV on May 29, 2026.

== Reception ==
The review aggregator website Rotten Tomatoes determined that 94% of 34 critics' reviews were positive, and the average of rated reviews was 8.3 out of 10. The website's critics consensus reads, "Taut, ambitious, and impressively self-assured, Star City proves a worthy expansion of the For All Mankind universe with its blend of political intrigue and human drama." Metacritic, which uses a weighted average, assigned a score of 80 out of 100, based on 16 critics, indicating "generally favorable" reviews.
