= Sarah Kameela Impey =

British actress

- Born: Ipswich, England
- Education: Arts Educational Schools
- Occupations: Actress, Singer
- Years active: 2013–present

Sarah Kameela Impey is a British actress and singer.

== Early life ==
She was born in Ipswich to an English father and Guyanese mother, of Indian descent. She has two older brothers. She attended the Arts Educational School of Acting in London.

== Career ==
She sang as part of soul indie band A Blossom Fell for six years.

Her theatre credits include Life of Pi at London's Wyndham's Theatre, Northern Broadsides’ production of Shakespeare’s Much Ado About Nothing, and The Tempest with The Royal Shakespeare Company. She made her feature film debut in Halcyon Heights, in 2016. During the COVID-19 pandemic she appeared in the online play The Three Musketeers, written by Sydney Stevenson and starring Robert Lindsay.

She plays Saira, the singer in the titular band in 2021 Channel 4 musical comedy series We Are Lady Parts. She described her feelings on first contact with the series as "Wow, I can’t believe someone’s written this; I can’t believe these characters can exist on screen". Her performance was described as "frighteningly charismatic " by Stephen Armstrong in The Times. She reprised the role for the second season in 2024.

She appeared as Neelum Khan in ITV series Maternal. She played the voice of Lena Manzour in long running radio soap opera The Archers. In 2023, she began a series regular role as Dr Paula Bennett in ITV series Vera.

== Partial filmography ==
Year	Title	Role	Notes
2016	Halcyon Heights	Shop girl	
2021-2024	We Are Lady Parts	Saira	Lead role
2023	Maternal	Neelum Khan	
2023	The Archers	Lena Manzour	
2024–2025	Vera	Dr Paula Bennett	7 episodes
2025	Silent Witness	Tina Steadman	1 episode, 2 parts (series 28)
