= Riley Jones (actor) =

British actor

- Born: Gateshead, England
- Education: Kingsmeadow Community Comprehensive School; Northumbria University
- Occupation: Actor
- Years active: 2012–present

Riley Jones is an English actor, known for his role as DC Mark Edwards on the ITV crime drama television series Vera (2011–2025).

== Filmography ==
Year	Title	Role	Notes
2011	United	Kenny Morgans	TV movie
2011–2025	Vera	DC Mark Edwards	Series regular
2012	Wolfblood	Front Desk Officer	Episode: A Quiet Night In
2014	Run	Nick	Short Film
2018	To Catch a Serial Killer with Trevor McDonald	PC Danny Jones	Documentary
2019	EastEnders	Ewan	2 episodes

== Theatre ==
Year	Title	Role	Notes
2017	The Importance of Being Earnest	Earnest Worthing	Brockley Jack Theatre
