= Rasha Nahas =

Palestinian singer (born 1996)

Rasha Nahas رشا نحاس
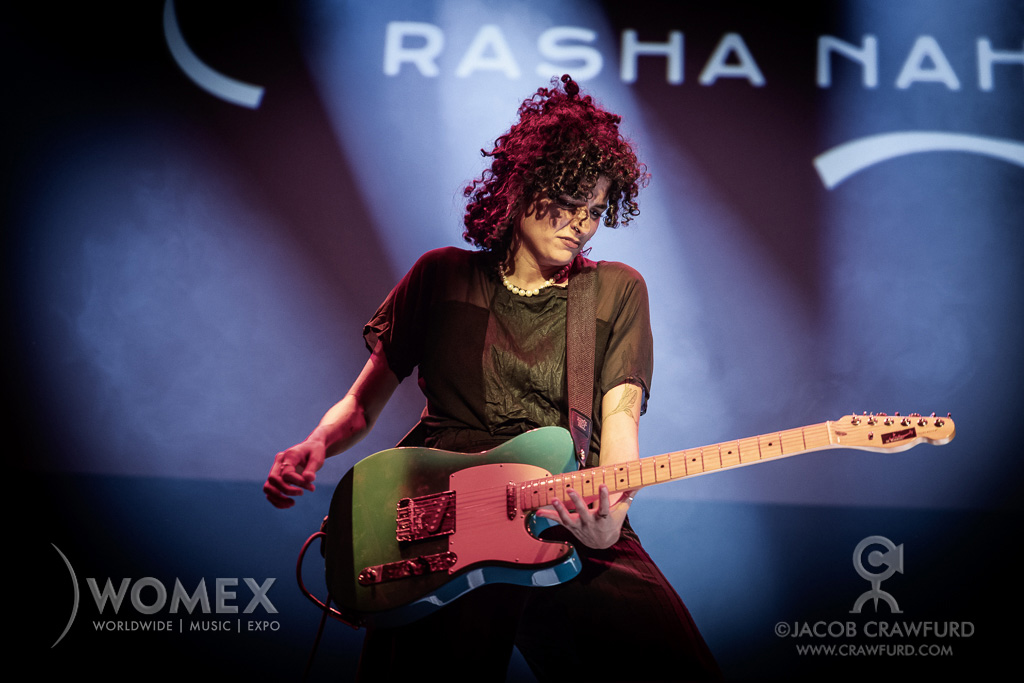
- Nahas at the 2024 World Music Expo

Background information
- Born: 10 May 1996 (age 30); Haifa
- Genre: Rock
- Instruments: Vocals; guitar
- Years active: 2015–present
- Labels: Cooking Vinyl; Glitterbeat Records; Rmad Records
- Member of: Rasha Nahas; Kallemi; Sodassi
- Award: Bertha Foundation Artivism Award

Rasha Nahas (Arabic: رشا نحاس, romanized: Rashā Naḥḥās; born 10 May 1996) is a Palestinian rock singer-songwriter, guitarist, producer and actress based in Berlin. She has released two albums Desert (2021) and Amrat (2023), the latter via Cooking Vinyl. She is also a member of the international ensemble Kallemi.

== Early life ==
Nahas was born and raised in Haifa with family roots in Tarshiha. Nahas trained in classical guitar since the age of 10.

== Career ==
Nahas first gained attention through an original song "Meen Bint Sgheeri" uploaded to YouTube in 2015 as part of a series titled Indigenous Sessions showcasing Palestinian musicians. She subsequently released her debut EP Am I in 2016. After performing at the first edition of Palestine Music Expo in Ramallah, she went on her first UK festival circuit, which included performing on the Silver Hayes stage at the 2017 Glastonbury Music Festival. Nahas relocated to Berlin in 2018. She co-founded the ensemble Kallemi with Jasmin Albash, La Nefera and Maysa Daw and joined the collective Sodassi mentored by Kamilya Jubran, which includes Sama' and Dina El Wedidi. After moving to Germany, Nahas began working in composition for dance and theater productions, including two plays at Thalia Theater in Hamburg.

In the lead up to her debut album, Nahas released the singles "The Clown", "Desert" and "Tea Song". After some delays related to the COVID-19 lockdown, she released her debut album Desert in January 2021 through her own label, Rmad Records. It also had a vinyl release via Cargo Records.

Later in 2021, Nahas signed with the British indie label Cooking Vinyl and released her first Arabic-language single "Al Madini". Via Cooking Vinyl, her second album and first Arabic-language album Amrat was released in January 2023. Singles ahead of its release included the title track; Nahas also previewed the album at the London's Royal Festival Hall at Women of the World Festival. Amrat includes collaborations with Dina El Wedidi and Terez Sliman. The album is described as an "exploration and celebration of her Palestinian identity".

Nahas contributed to the second series of the Channel 4 sitcom We Are Lady Parts, which aired in 2024. In 2025, Nahas released the single "Ghanneeli", a collaboration with Jason Lindner and Jelmer De Haan and collaborated with Tamer Nafar and Nasir Al Bashir on "Rock It Like a Palestinian". Nahas is set to make her feature film debut in Fly Little Bird directed by Johannes Bösiger; she also contributed to the film's soundtrack alongside Nitin Sawhney, Zoe Bleu and Hugh Padgham. Her third album, produced with Meshell Ndegeocello, is scheduled for release on March 19th 2027.

== Artistry ==
Nahas developed as a musician working in her hometown's underground music scene with local bands and musicians. Nahas' early influences included John Lennon, Queen, David Bowie and The Velvet Underground. She also grew up listening to Fairuz, Kadim Al Sahir and Asmahan. Her other influences include Patti Smith, Leonard Cohen, PJ Harvey, Joni Mitchell, Mashrou' Leila and Soap Kills.

== Discography ==
=== Albums ===
- Desert (2021)
- Amrat (2023)
- Live in Berlin (2026)

=== EPs ===
- Am I (2016)
- Viajeras EP (2026) with Kallemi

=== Singles ===
- "The Clown" (2019)
- "Desert" (2020)
- "Tea Song" (2020)
- "The Fall" (2020)
- "Al Madini" (2021)
- "Meen Bint Sgheeri" (2022)
- "Ya Binti" (2022)
- "Nbeed" (2022)
- "Amrat" (2022)
- "Ghanneeli" (2025)
- "Rock It Like a Palestinian" (2025) with Tamer Nafar and Nasir Al Bashir
- Manaqish (2026)
- TOKSIK / توكسيك (2026)
