= Priya Kansara =

British actress

- Born: Priya Uday Kansara; 1995 (age 30–31); Enfield, Greater London, England
- Education: University College London
- Years active: 2022–present
- Spouse: Ankit Bhatt (m. 2026)

Priya Uday Kansara (born 1995) is a British actress. After making her debut with appearances in the Netflix series Bridgerton and The Bastard Son & The Devil Himself (both 2022), she starred in the Nida Manzoor film Polite Society (2023).

== Early life ==
Kansara was born in the Enfield borough, London, United Kingdom and is of Indian descent. She has a younger brother.

Kansara attended Palmers Green High School in London and Dame Alice Owen's School in Potters Bar. She graduated from University College London in 2017 with a Bachelor of Science in Molecular Biology. She did acting as a hobby in the meantime. She subsequently worked in healthcare communications for BCW Global, but had ambitions to act. She continued her day job while taking night classes at the Identity School of Acting for three years until March 2021.

== Career ==
Kansara's first audition after leaving her job led her to appear in season two of the period drama Bridgerton for Netflix as Miss Eaton. Shortly afterward she appeared in another Netflix series, The Bastard Son & The Devil Himself. In the summer of 2022, Kansara was named a Screen International Star of Tomorrow.

Kansara next played the lead role of Ria Khan in the British action comedy film Polite Society, directed by Nida Manzoor. Following the premiere of Polite Society at the Sundance Film Festival, Peter Debruge, writing in Variety, said that she was “a natural who, believe it or not, has never had a lead role till now” who in the role of the culturally straight-jacketed wannabe stunt woman “plays with deliciously exaggerated indignance”. Praise also came from Adrian Horton writing in The Guardian who described her as a “delightful newcomer”, and Chase Hutchinson for Collider who says Kansara “already in her relatively short career, has all the makings of a star. She can fully dive into the moments of silly slapstick just as she does the more nuanced emotional beats about trying to find your way in the world.” Manzoor jokingly referred to Kansara as “the next Tom Cruise... She did so many of her own stunts.” When asked about this comparison Kansara told The Guardian, “I feel very lucky knowing her, working with her; for her to call me [that] is pretty cool. Tom Cruise, step aside!” For her role in the film, Kansara was nominated in the Breakthrough Performance category at the 2023 British Independent Film Awards.

In 2025, she appeared in BBC One historical drama Dope Girls. In July 2025, she joined the cast of Apple TV+ series Star City.

== Personal life ==
In 2026, Kansara married actor Ankit Bhatt.

== Filmography ==
Key
| † | Denotes works that have not yet been released |

| Year | Title | Role | Notes |
|---|---|---|---|
| 2022 | Bridgerton | Miss Eaton | 2 episodes |
| 2022 | The Bastard Son & The Devil Himself | Flo | 3 episodes |
| 2023 | Polite Society | Ria Khan | Film |
| 2025 | Dope Girls | Lilly | 6 episodes |
| 2026 | Project Hail Mary | Mary (voice) | |
| 2026 | Star City | Lakshmi | Main role |
