= We Are Lady Parts =

British sitcom

- Genre: Sitcom
- Created by: Nida Manzoor
- Written by: Nida Manzoor
- Directed by: Nida Manzoor
- Country of origin: United Kingdom
- Original language: English
- No. of series: 2
- No. of episodes: 12

Production
- Executive producers: Surian Fletcher-Jones; Mark Freeland; Tim Bevan; Eric Fellner
- Producer: John Pocock
- Camera setup: Single-camera
- Running time: 24–25 minutes
- Production company: Working Title Television

Original release
- Network: Channel 4
- Release: 20 May 2021 – 13 June 2024

We Are Lady Parts is a British television sitcom created, written, and directed by Nida Manzoor. The series follows a British punk rock band named Lady Parts, which consists entirely of Muslim women.

After airing as a 14-minute pilot on 21 December 2018 on Channel 4, it was commissioned for a six-episode series co-produced with Peacock, which premiered 20 May 2021. The show has been nominated for multiple accolades including two prizes at the Gotham Awards and a Rose d'Or award. In November 2021, creator Nida Manzoor received the Rose d'Or Emerging Talent Award for her work on the show. The series has also won two Peabody Awards.

== Premise ==
An all-female Muslim punk band in the UK takes inspiration from London's rich and diverse collection of cultures. Friendships, relationships and cultural differences are navigated as the band seeks musical success.

== Cast ==
=== Lady Parts ===
- Anjana Vasan as Amina, a microbiology PhD student who is Lady Parts' new lead guitar player
- Sarah Kameela Impey as Saira, Lady Parts' founder, lead singer and rhythm guitar player - and a halal butcher
- Juliette Motamed as Ayesha, Lady Parts' drummer and Uber driver
- Faith Omole as Bisma, Lady Parts' bass player, comic artist and mother
- Lucie Shorthouse as Momtaz, Lady Parts' manager whose daytime job is being a cheap women's lingerie purveyor

=== Friends and family of Lady Parts ===
==== Introduced in Series 1 ====
- Aiysha Hart as Noor, Amina's best friend
- Zaqi Ismail as Ahsan, Ayesha's brother and Amina's crush
- Shobu Kapoor as Seema, Amina's mother
- David Avery as Abdullah, Saira's boyfriend

==== Introduced in Series 2 ====
Sources:

- Jack Riddiford as Billy, Ahsan's friend and Amina's love interest
- Anna Tolstoy as Laura, Ayesha's girlfriend
- Lydia Leonard as Clarice, a music manager who approached Lady Parts

=== Second Wife ===
Second Wife are another Muslim girl-band inspired by Lady Parts, whose songs they covered. Introduced in Series 2 of the show, the band's members are:

- Bradley Banton as Ali
- Kimani Arthur as Taifa
- Eman Alali as Farah

=== Other musicians ===
The final episode of Series 2 featured several musicians from outside the production:

- Saima Khalid
- Shez Manzoor
- Lauriem Mompelat
- Rasha Nahas
- Elaha Soroor

== Episodes ==
Series	Episodes	Originally released	
Series	Episodes	First released	Last released
Pilot		21 December 2018	
1	6	20 May 2021	24 June 2021
2	6	30 May 2024	13 June 2024

=== Pilot (2018) ===
No. overall	No. in season	Title	Directed by	Written by	Original release date	U.K. viewers (millions)
–	–	"Lady Parts"	Nida Manzoor	Nida Manzoor	21 December 2018	N/A
27-year-old Amina Hussein is studying for a doctorate in biochemical engineering alongside meeting potential spouses. The protagonist breaks the fourth wall by directly addressing the audience. Amina's orbit collides with Muslim punk band Lady Parts when she inadvertently finds herself at their auditions for a new lead guitarist. The band, a three-piece all-girl outfit from Camden comprises Saira, the tattooed lead singer and guitarist who is a halal butcher; Ayesha, the drummer and Uber driver; Bisma, the bass guitarist with a market stall selling her artworks, and Momtaz (AKA Taz), the band's niqāb-clad manager who sells cheap ladies' lingerie. Closing credits track: "Kill My Sister".

=== Series 1 (2021) ===
No. overall	No. in season	Title	Directed by	Written by	Original release date	U.K. viewers (millions)
1	1	"Play Something"	Nida Manzoor	Nida Manzoor	20 May 2021	N/A
The first two acts of the opening episode are an extended version of the pilot. Amina is now a 26-year-old student finishing her PhD in microbiology. When her best friend Noor reveals that she is engaged, Amina is determined to find a significant other as well. After Ayesha's brother, Ahsan Alkaaf, hands her a flyer for Lady Parts' auditions she visits the butcher's shop to track him down. There, Saira recognises her from primary school. At a charity fundraiser, Amina is forced onto stage despite her fear of performing in public when one of her music students gets stage fright and drops out. Featured tracks: "Ain't No One Gonna Honour Kill My Sister but Me". "I Am a Girl of Constant Sorrow". Closing credits track: "All the Small Things".
2	2	"Potential Future Spouse"	Nida Manzoor	Nida Manzoor	27 May 2021	N/A
Momtaz attempts to raise the bands' profile with an online presence but Saira has serious misgivings. With the upcoming Sound Smash competition, the band track Amina to her university lab and offer to fix her up on a date with Ahsan in exchange for auditioning as their lead guitarist. Despite a few embarrassing mishaps on date night, Amina is giddy with excitement when Ahsan messages her to say he had a great time. She invites him to Noor's engagement party. When he friend zones her, Amina's dejection finds an outlet through her music. Featured track: "Bashir With the Good Beard".
3	3	"Earth Natives"	Nida Manzoor	Nida Manzoor	3 June 2021	N/A
Amina tries to keep her two lives separated, one as lead guitarist in a punk rock band and one as Noor’s best friend. However, when the Sound Smash audition slot is revealed to clash with Noor's engagement party, she has an anxiety attack. The band take her into the countryside for some primal scream therapy and bond around a campfire. When Amina bumps into Ahsan at university, Noor remarks how much she is looking forward to seeing the couple at her engagement party. Ahsan agrees to accompany Amina to the party in order to keep up appearances. Having escaped to the audition, Amina freezes on stage when the band's big moment comes. Featured track: "Voldemort Under My Headscarf".
4	4	"Godzilla"	Nida Manzoor	Nida Manzoor	10 June 2021	N/A
Amina apologies to Noor for abandoning her engagement party and to Saira for the disastrous audition, but expresses the desire to remain in the band. In return, Saira persuades Amina to recite a poem at an open mic night at a local pub in an attempt to help her overcome the stage anxiety. Despite the setback of the audition, Momtaz continues to promote the band online and agrees to a magazine piece for an influencer called Zarina. Ayesha believes she has found love at first sight. Zarina arranges for the band to play a gig in a pub full of racists. Featured track: "9 to 5"
5	5	"Represent"	Nida Manzoor	Nida Manzoor	17 June 2021	N/A
Having overcome her stage fright and now a fully fledged member of Lady Parts, Amina juggles her commitments to the band and her best friend Noor, whose wedding day approaches. Ahsan decides to progress his relationship with Amina beyond his self-declared friend zone. When Zarina's magazine piece is published it portrays the band and its members in a less than flattering light, resulting in a lot of online hate and threatening to tear the band apart. Noor, alerted to the deception by her best friend, disowns Amina, who has a crisis of conscience and quits the band. Featured tracks: "Fish and Chips". Closing credits track: "Yaar Vekho" by Sanam Marvi
6	6	"Sparta"	Nida Manzoor	Nida Manzoor	24 June 2021	N/A
A month later, Noor reconciles with Amina and resumes the hunt to find her a suitable husband. Bisma starts temping as a receptionist to fill the band-shaped hole in her life and Ayesha finds new employment as a food courier after crashing her car. Lady Parts' fans, however, start a grassroots campaign and Momtaz decides a gig is warranted to meet the demand. With the original members reunited the venue is revealed to be a builder's yard. Amina rejects the band's overtures and declines to rejoin. As the band prepare to perform without her, Amina has a change of heart. Featured tracks: "Creep". "We Are the Champions".

=== Series 2 (2024) ===
No. overall	No. in season	Title	Directed by	Written by	Original release date	U.K. viewers (millions)
7	1	"Villain Era"	Nida Manzoor	Nida Manzoor	30 May 2024	N/A
Having completed her PhD, Amina and the band are touring across the UK with her mother and Ahsan acting as roadies. The band decide the next step is to record their first album and with a renowned producer lined-up, the only hurdles are the recording studio and sound engineer fees. Whilst trying to secure more gigs to raise the cash, Momtaz learns of competition in the form of Second Wife, another muslim girl-band, who perform cover versions of Lady Parts' songs. At a folk music evening, Ahsan's jealousy is aroused when Amina finds a kindred spirit in his friend and colleague Billy. Featured tracks: "More Than Words", "Villain Era" Closing credits: "Look What They've Done to My Song, Ma"
8	2	"Malala Made Me Do It"	Nida Manzoor	Nida Manzoor	30 May 2024	N/A
Noor, who is in the late stages of pregnancy, and Amina are now reconciled. Saira receives an eviction notice from the council who intend to redevelop her block. After the loss of both their rehearsal space and mojo, rescue comes in the form of Laura, Ayesha's new partner, who offers the use of her parents' summer retreat in Norfolk. When Lady Parts are offered a deal to endorse mascara, the band learns that Momtaz has been approached by Second Wife to become their manager and has signed them to her record label. At the retreat, the band pen a new track with a distinctly non-punk sound, celebrate Saira's 30th birthday, and agree to play a fan's wedding in order to raise some cash. Guest starring: Malala Yousafzai. Featured track: "Malala Made Me Do It"
9	3	"It's Britney, Bitch"	Nida Manzoor	Nida Manzoor	6 June 2024	N/A
After the band turn up at the wedding and play cover versions in their distinctive style, Saira is approached by a professional artist manager, whom she subsequently agrees to meet. Amina joins Billy on Denmark Street to look at guitars and the two proceed to flirt. When the non-believer kisses her, Amina runs away as fast as she can. Ayesha meets Laura's parents over an awkward lunch. When Lady Parts have an informal get together with Second Wife at Bisma's house, the resentment between the struggling millennials and the successful gen-z's resurfaces. The band agree to a fashion shoot in their desperation to raise more money. Featured track: "Oops!... I Did It Again" Closing credits: "Zaharilia" by El Michels Affair
10	4	"Don't Let Me Be Misunderstood"	Nida Manzoor	Nida Manzoor	6 June 2024	N/A
After the dumpster fire that was the photo shoot, the band take a break from weekly rehearsals and Saira takes the opportunity to hear what Clarice, the professional manager, has to say. When Ayesha denies that Laura is her girlfriend after being spotted together in public, her lack of honesty about her sexuality comes under the microscope. Amina's guilt about Billy manifests itself with some pretty strange dreams. When she eventually confesses to Noor, a weight is lifted off her shoulders. Bisma has her hair restyled in box braids as a new form of self-expression and considers retiring her headscarf. When the band meet at the studios after their hiatus, Saira reveals the offer from Clarice. Momtaz turns up unexpectedly and gives them her blessing, but returns home to her mother in tears. Featured track: "Don't Let Me Be Misunderstood" Closing credits: "Habbetek" by Rasha Nahas
11	5	"Funny Muslim Song"	Nida Manzoor	Nida Manzoor	13 June 2024	N/A
Lady Parts sign a record deal with a big label and begin recording their first studio album. Introduced to her idol, Sister Squire, Saira loses her self-composure, but when Lady Parts' music is described as light-weight 'fun' Saira's songwriting takes a deeper political turn. The other band members are concerned that this new direction doesn't reflect their lived experience. Clarice also cautions Saira against the move. Amina gives Billy another chance but realises he is not the man for her and may be exoticising her. Meanwhile, Momtaz takes a trip to her hometown of Birmingham to see her sister and comes across an undiscovered talent in the freestyle rapping of one her childhood friends. Guest starring: Meera Syal Closing credits: "Nbeed" by Rasha Nahas
12	6	"Glass Ceiling Feeling (US) / The Reason (UK)"	Nida Manzoor	Nida Manzoor	13 June 2024	N/A
When the label brings in session musicians to help 'finesse' Lady Parts' tracks, the band rebel against Lucien, the A&R guy. Saira remains dissociated from the entire process as she understands they have signed away the rights to the album. Clarice explains to the band how the industry works. In an attempt to reconnect with Momtaz, Saira agrees to give Second Wife a songwriting lesson and discovers the multitude of musicians Taz has taken under her wing. At the launch of Villain Era, the band's debut album, Saira discovers that a key track is missing. In protest, the band upload the entire album online for people to download for free and make a hasty exit. Amina finally declares her interest in Ahsan by serenading him. Featured tracks: "Glass Ceiling Feeling". "The Reason". Closing credits: "I'm Gonna Be (500 Miles)"

== Production ==
Lady Parts was first ordered as pilot for Channel 4's "Comedy Blaps" strand in mid 2018. The 14-minute pilot premiered later the same year.

Shez Manzoor scored the show. The commissioned series contains both original punk songs and cover tracks. Nida Manzoor wrote and adapted this music alongside her siblings Shez and Sanya Manzoor and Benni Fregin. The actors in the show all play their own instruments, although some had to learn specifically in order to perform on the show. Manzoor explained that "the band's music is such an intrinsic part of the show. Through the music, we see the characters in their element and singing their truth, capturing them in all their joy and silliness. This soundtrack is best enjoyed turned up to eleven, headbanging alone in one's bedroom".

And album featuring all the songs from both series 1 and 2 of the show were released by Proper Music following the broadcast of the second series in 2024. The track list comprises 15 tracks and includes both original songs and covers featured on the show.

We Are Lady Parts - Music From Seasons 1 & 2 - track listing
No.	Title	Performed by	Length
1.	"Ain't No One Gonna Honour Kill My Sister But Me"	Lady Parts (Anjana Vasan, Sarah Kameela Impey, Juliette Motamed, and Faith Omole)	2:30
2.	"Bashir With The Good Beard"	Lady Parts	2:21
3.	"Voldemort Under My Head Scarf"	Lady Parts	1:46
4.	"9 To 5" (Dolly Parton cover)	Lady Parts	1:58
5.	"Fish And Chips"	Lady Parts	1:52
6.	"Creep" (Radiohead cover)	Anjana Vasan	1:54
7.	"We Are The Champions" (Queen cover)	Lady Parts	2:45
8.	"Villain Era"	Lady Parts	2:50
9.	"Bashir With The Good Beard"	Second Wife (Bradley Banton, Kimani Arthur and Eman Alali)	1:45
10.	"Malala Made Me Do It"	Lady Parts	1:54
11.	"Oops!...I Did It Again" (Britney Spears cover)	Lady Parts	2:50
12.	"Don't Let Me Be Misunderstood"	Faith Omole	2:06
13.	"Glass Ceiling Feeling"	Lady Parts	2:27
14.	"Jama Narenji, The Undeniable & Nbeed"	Elaha Soroor, Shez Manzoor, Sai, Haleemah X, Lauriem Mompelat, and Rasha Nahas	3:56
15.	"The Reason" (Hoobastank cover)	Lady Parts	2:37
Total length:			35:31

== Broadcast ==
We Are Lady Parts premiered on Channel 4 on 20 May 2021, with all episodes simultaneously becoming available for streaming on All 4. In November 2021, Peacock and Channel 4 announced that a second series had been commissioned. Series 2 includes cameos from education activist Malala Yousafzai and comedian Meera Syal.

=== International broadcast ===
Series 1 premiered on 21 May 2021 on Stan (Australia) and Sky New Zealand and later on Peacock (United States) on 3 June 2021 and Showcase (Canada) on 9 June 2021. Series 2 premiered on 30 May 2024 on Peacock (United States) and Channel 4 (United Kingdom) with all episodes made available for streaming on both platforms.

== Reception ==
=== Critical reception ===
On Rotten Tomatoes, series 1 has a score of 100% based on 48 critics with an average rating of 8.20 out of 10. The critical consensus reads, "Infectious energy, great songs, and a magnetic cast come together to make We Are Lady Parts a rocking comedy that is as subversive as it is hilarious". On Metacritic, series 1 has a score of 83 out of 100 based on 17 reviews indicating "universal acclaim".

Radhika Seth from Vogue described the series as a "riotous comedy that's unlike anything you've seen before"; they stated that it "hinges on a quintet of note-perfect performances". The Financial Times discussed that "progressive representations highlight a truth about being a modern-day Muslim: you can be both God-fearing and weed-smoking; disorderly and devotional. Far from a clash, these things reflect a cultural mish-mash of the tangled and contradictory parts of ourselves that make us delightfully, bafflingly human", and "We Are Lady Parts is among a wave of shows casting off stereotypes and at ease with complexity... The well-worn trope of oppressed Muslim women is nowhere to be seen among these tattooed, anarchic rebels, who are, nevertheless, practising Muslims. When they're not prostrating in prayer, they are ripping through provocative punk anthems such as 'Nobody's Gonna Honour Kill My Sister But Me'". The Guardian said: "We Are Lady Parts's writing is pleasingly knowing. By the end of the first few episodes, a litany of Muslim stereotypes have been poked fun at... What is particularly striking is how refreshingly cheerful it all is. The series is reminiscent of the Canadian sitcom Schitt's Creek and the joy it spread for showing a same-sex couple without the constant terror of homophobia... We Are Lady Parts does something that many diverse shows have not: it delivers on the potential of representation. In short, it actually is funny. And not in an "in-joke" way, but in the classic slapstick way of people falling over, and wry observations about the complexities of modern womanhood".

Series 2 has a score of 98% on Rotten Tomatoes, based on 16 critics. On Metacritic, series 2 has a score of 84 out of 100 based on 10 reviews, once again indicating "universal acclaim". Rachael Healey of inews awarded the second series 4 stars out of 5, noting that "This series shifts further towards drama than the first". Ellen Jones of The Guardian, also awarded the follow-up series four stars, commenting "We Are Lady Parts strides into its second series with a combination of insouciant self-assurance and anarchic enthusiasm that is itself very punk". Benji Wilson of The Daily Telegraph gave the series a middling 3 stars, stating that "Formerly funny, brazen and buccaneering, this new series simply involves too many characters".

=== Awards and nominations ===
Year	Award	Category	Nominee(s)	Result	Ref.
2021	Edinburgh International Television Festival	Best Comedy Series	We Are Lady Parts	Won	
2021	Gotham Awards	Outstanding Performance in New Series	Anjana Vasan	Nominated	
2021	Gotham Awards	Breakthrough Series – Short Format	We Are Lady Parts	Nominated	
2021	Rose d'Or Awards	Emerging Talent Award	Nida Manzoor	Won	
2021	Golden Reel Awards	Outstanding Achievement in Sound Editing – 1/2 Hour – Comedy or Drama	Jay Price, Tom Foster, Dario Swade, and Sam Walsh (for "Sparta")	Nominated	
2021	RTS Craft & Design Awards	Editing – Entertainment and Comedy	Robbie Morrison	Won	
2021	RTS Craft & Design Awards	Make Up Design – Entertainment & Non Drama	Claire Carter	Won	
2021	RTS Craft & Design Awards	Production Design – Entertainment & Non Drama	Simon Walker	Won	
2021	RTS Craft & Design Awards	Casting Award	Aisha Bywaters	Nominated	
2021	RTS Craft & Design Awards	Photography – Drama & Comedy	Diana Olifirova	Nominated	
2022	Broadcast Awards	Best Comedy Programme	We Are Lady Parts	Highly Commended	
2022	National Comedy Awards	Outstanding Comedy Actress	Anjana Vasan	Nominated	
2022	BAFTA TV Awards	Best Scripted Comedy	We Are Lady Parts	Nominated	
2022	BAFTA TV Awards	Best Female Comedy Performance	Anjana Vasan	Nominated	
2022	BAFTA TV Craft Awards	Best Costume Design	PC Williams	Won	
2022	BAFTA TV Craft Awards	Best Scripted Casting	Aisha Bywaters	Won	
2022	BAFTA TV Craft Awards	Best Writer: Comedy	Nida Manzoor	Won	
2022	BAFTA TV Craft Awards	Best Emerging Talent: Fiction	Nida Manzoor	Nominated	
2022	Peabody Awards	Entertainment	We Are Lady Parts	Won	
2022	RTS Programme Awards	Writer: Comedy	Nida Manzoor	Won	
2022	RTS Programme Awards	Scripted Comedy	We Are Lady Parts	Won	
2022	RTS Programme Awards	Comedy Performance: Female	Anjana Vasan	Won	
2022	RTS Programme Awards	Breakthrough Award	Anjana Vasan	Nominated	
2024	Television Critics Association Awards	Outstanding Achievement in Comedy	We Are Lady Parts	Nominated	
2024	British Society of Cinematographers Awards	Best Cinematography in a Television Drama (UK Terrestrial)	Diana Olifirova (for "Funny Muslim Song")	Nominated	
2025	Peabody Awards	Entertainment	We Are Lady Parts	Won	
2025	Golden Reel Awards	Outstanding Achievement in Music Editing – Broadcast Short Form	Andy Patterson (for "The Reason")	Nominated	
