= Nida Manzoor =

British writer and director

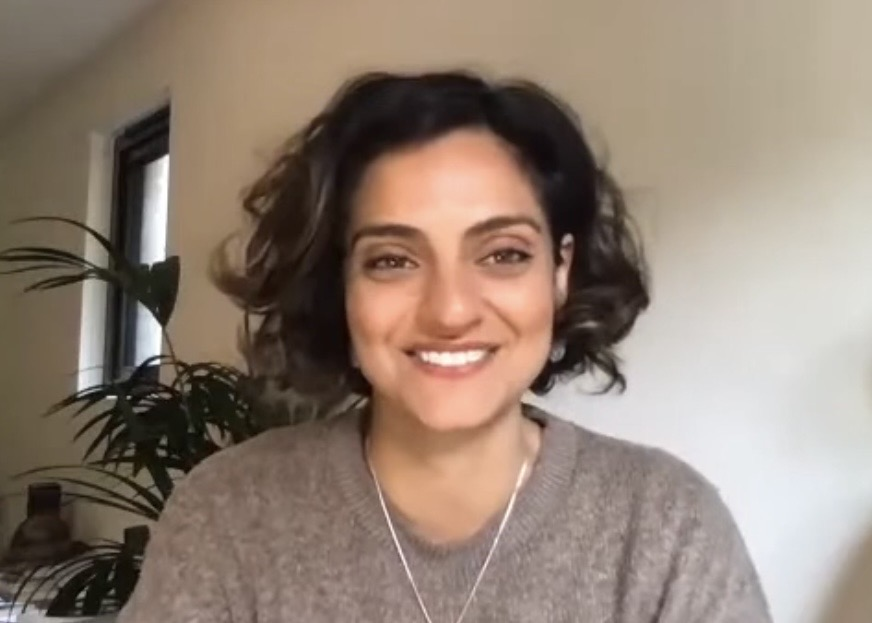
- Manzoor in 2021
- Born: Nida Naima Manzoor; September 1989 (age 36); London
- Occupations: Screenwriter and director
- Years active: 2013–present
- Notable work: As writer and creator; We Are Lady Parts (2021–2024); Polite Society (2023); As director; Doctor Who – "Fugitive of the Judoon" and "Nikola Tesla's Night of Terror" (2020)

Nida Naima Manzoor is a British screenwriter and director. She is best known for creating the Channel 4/Peacock comedy show We Are Lady Parts, for which she won the 2021 Rose d'Or Emerging Talent Award and the 2022 BAFTA for TV Comedy Screenwriting. The series has also won her two Peabody Awards. She released her debut feature film Polite Society in 2023, which earned her the 2023 British Independent Film Award for Debut Screenwriting.

== Early life and education ==
Nida Manzoor grew up in a Pakistani Muslim family. Her family lived in Singapore until she was 10, later moving to London.

She was raised in a musical household, and was bought her first guitar by her father when she was eight. Manzoor has described music as her "first passion", and is quoted as saying "I wanted to be a brown girl Bob Dylan before I wanted to do screenwriting." She also started writing at a young age. Manzoor describes being encouraged by her grandfather, who kept anything she wrote in a file. Manzoor's childhood influences included Jackie Chan films, the Coen Brothers, Edgar Wright, and old Hollywood cinema.

She attended the fee-paying St James School in London.

She graduated from University College London (UCL) with a degree in politics in 2011. While at university, Manzoor was involved in UCL's Film Society. Manzoor's family had expected her to do a law conversion course and become a human rights lawyer, but she convinced them to allow her to pursue a career in filmmaking.

== Career ==
Manzoor started her film career working as a runner in Soho. She went on to obtain jobs as a screenwriter, working for the CBBC. After early shorts like Layla and Arcade, she wrote episodes for Dixi and Jamillah and Aladdin in 2016.

Manzoor's first directing role was on the first series of Enterprice, released in 2018. In 2018, she was also commissioned to make a pilot episode (titled "Lady Parts") for what would become We Are Lady Parts. She wrote and directed the episode. After the episode was screened, there was substantial backlash regarding her portrayal of Muslim women, leading her to close her social media accounts. She also directed a comedy pilot, Hounslow Diaries, which was screened on BBC Three in 2018.

She directed two episodes of Doctor Who, "Fugitive of the Judoon" and "Nikola Tesla's Night of Terror", shown in 2020.

We Are Lady Parts proceeded to a full series in 2021, written, directed, and executive produced by Manzoor. She has said the series is somewhat autobiographical. She has cited This is Spinal Tap and The Young Ones as influences for the series. Manzoor co-wrote the music with her siblings Shez Manzoor and Sanya Manzoor, and with her brother-in-law Benjamin 'Benni' Fregin. A soundtrack album from the series was released digitally. The show was renewed for a second series in November 2021.

As of 2021, Manzoor is part of the Pillars Artist Fellowship Advisory Board.

Production on Manzoor's debut feature film, Polite Society, was completed in early 2022 and was released in the UK in April 2023. The film stars Priya Kansara and Ritu Arya, and distributed internationally by Universal Pictures.

== Awards and recognition ==
In 2015, Manzoor was named among Broadcast Magazine's Hot Shots for her short film 7.2.

She won best Director in Comedy Drama/Situation Comedy from the Royal Television Society Craft & Design Awards 2019 for her work on Enterprice.

In November 2021, Manzoor was awarded the 2021 Rose d'Or Emerging Talent Award for her work on Lady Parts. In 2022, she won the BAFTA for TV Comedy Screenwriting for Lady Parts.

She won the British Independent Film Award for Debut Screenwriting for Polite Society in 2023.

== Filmography ==
Short film

Year	Title	Director	Writer	Producer
2013	Layla	Yes	Yes	Yes
2013	Arcade	Yes	Yes	No
2014	7.2	Yes	Yes	No

Feature film

Year	Title	Director	Writer
2023	Polite Society	Yes	Yes

Television

Year	Title	Director	Writer	Notes
2016	Dixi	No	Yes	6 episodes
2016	Jamillah and Aladdin	No	Yes	3 episodes
2017	Halloween Comedy Shorts	Yes	No	Episode "A Deal"
2017–2018	Enterprice	Yes	No	5 episodes
2018	Hounslow Diaries	Yes	No	TV pilot
2018–present	We Are Lady Parts	Yes	Yes	7 episodes; Also creator, composer and co-producer
2020	Doctor Who	Yes	No	Episodes "Nikola Tesla's Night of Terror" and "Fugitive of the Judoon"
