= Ratanpur (disambiguation) =

Ratanpur may refer to:

== Places ==
- Ratanpur, Bhopal (census code 482467), a village in Madhya Pradesh
- Ratanpur, Bhopal (census code 482555), another village in Madhya Pradesh
- Ratanpur, Chhattisgarh, a town and formerly princely state in Chhattisgarh
- Ratanpur Dhamanka, a town and formerly princely state in Kathiawar, Gujarat
- Ratanpur Miri Gaon, a village in Assam
- Ratanpur, Purba Bardhaman, a village in West Bengal
- Ratanpur, Raebareli, a village in Uttar Pradesh
- Ratanpur Union, a union council in Satkhira District, Bangladesh

== Other uses ==
- Ratanpur (film), a 2018 Indian Gujarati-language film
- Ratanpur Group, a Bangladeshi conglomerate

== See also ==
- Ghulam Nabi Ratanpuri, Indian politician
- Ratua Ratanpur, a village in Berasia tehsil, Bhopal district, Madhya Pradesh
- Ratnapur (disambiguation)
- Ratanpura, Uttar Pradesh, India
- Ratanpura, Churu district, Rajasthan, India
