= Ram Bahadur Bomjon =

Nepalese religious leader

- राम बहादुर बमजन
- Born: 1989 or 1990 (age 36–37); Nepal
- Other names: Palden Dorje, Buddha Boy
- Parents: Bir Bahadur Tamang; Maya Devi Tamang

Ram Bahadur Bomjon (Sanskrit: राम बहादुर बम्जन; born 1989 or 1990, sometimes spelled Bomjan, Banjan, or Bamjan), previously known as Palden Dorje (his monastic name) is an ascetic from Ratanapuri, Bara district, Nepal who gained widespread attention and media popularity because of a perceived resemblance to Gautama Buddha, leading to claims that he is a reincarnation of Gautama Buddha.

Bomjon's followers have claimed that he meditates for months without eating or sleeping. Buddhist scholars have disputed these claims.

In June 2024, Bomjon was convicted on charges of child sexual abuse. In April 2025, he was acquitted by the Janakpur High Court, which overturned the earlier conviction because the case had been filed after the statute of limitations.

== Biography ==
In May 2005, the 15-year-old Bomjon left his home near the Indian border after a dream in which a god appeared to him and told him to do so, and sat amongst the roots of a pipal tree to meditate. Claims suggest that for 10 months he rarely spoke, drank, ate, or even moved. Thousands, if not hundreds of thousands of people visited the site to see the boy motionless for hours, days or as rumoured even months, or came in devotion to the possibility of an important spiritual event occurring.

As a result of some of these claims, Bomjon's followers believe he is an incarnation of the historical Buddha, Gautama. Bomjon has rejected such comparisons, saying "Tell the people not to call me a Buddha. I don't have the Buddha's energy currently. I am at the level of a rinpoche." Mahiswor Raj Bajracharya, the president of the Nepal Buddhist Council, has stated likewise: "We do not believe he is Buddha. He does not have Buddha's qualities". Buddhist scholars have been sceptical of Bomjon's claims to be able to meditate for months on end without food or drink.

On 11 March 2006, he went missing. On 19 March, Bed Bahadur Lama of the Om Namo Buddha Tapaswi Sewa Samiti (ONBTSS) told reporters that they had seen him in Bara District and that they had spoken to him for half-an-hour, during which Bomjon reportedly assured that he would return in six years.

He was seen again in August 2007, preaching to crowds in Nepal's Hallori jungle, around 100 miles south of Kathmandu.

== Legal issues ==
In 2010, Bomjon was investigated for attacking a group of 17 villagers. Bomjon claimed that they were intentionally disturbing his meditation. However, the villagers said they were just looking for vegetables. Bomjon claimed to have taken "minor action" against them with just his hands after they had "tried to manhandle" him, and stopped as soon as they apologized. However, the victims claim that for three hours he struck them on their head and back with an axe handle, resulting in serious injury of one of the victims. Bomjon refused to attend any potential trial, stating, "Do you think a meditating sage will go to the court to hear a case? I took action against them as per the divine law".

In 2012, Nepal Police announced that they had rescued a Slovak woman from Bomjon's followers, but other reports claimed that she had been voluntarily released after media coverage of the kidnapping. Newsweek reported she had been taken from a hotel by two of Bomjon's men riding on a motorcycle and kept tied to a tree for three months and accused of practicing witchcraft in order to disturb Bomjon’s meditation. However, another report claimed she had been kidnapped from a monastery. When she was released, she had a broken arm. A week after her release, Bomjon's siblings accused him of holding his brothers captive overnight, and beating his brothers and his sister. Followers of Bomjon also assaulted five journalists and destroyed their cameras after they had recorded one of Bomjon's sermons.

An investigation was opened in January 2019 after complaints from family members that four devotees had gone missing from several of Bomjon's ashrams. In the same month, police raided one of Bomjon's ashrams in Nepal, but he was not found. On February 6, 2020, the Sarlahi District Court issued an arrest warrant against Bomjon. The following day, police raided another one of his ashrams in Kamalamai, Sindhuli District, but Bomjon again was not found. However, police did arrest one of his disciples, Gyan Bahadur Bomjan. A trial in the case is pending.

=== Sexual abuse charges ===
In September 2018, Bomjon was accused of raping an 18-year-old nun repeatedly for nearly two years. During a press conference organized by women's rights groups, the nun also accused his wife of trying to keep the abuse hidden so as not to "attract attacks" on their religion. Supporters of Bomjon claim that the nun was in fact involved in theft, and had been expelled from the monastery. Nepalese authorities issued an arrest warrant for Bomjon in January 2020.

On 9 January 2024, based on that 2020 warrant, a team from the Central Investigation Bureau of the Nepal police arrested Bomjon at his hideout in Budhanilkantha. Bomjon was arrested after jumping two floors from a window during his escape attempt. They also confiscated Nepalese currency and foreign currencies of over 17 different countries, equivalent to NPR 33 million (equivalent to US$230,000).

In June 2024, Bomjon was convicted of child sexual abuse. He was sentenced to ten years in prison, but had until 10 September to appeal his conviction. He was later acquitted by the Janakpur High Court, who overturned the earlier conviction because the case had been filed after the statute of limitations. Following the acquittal, Bomjon was released from prison on 20th April 2025.

== See also ==
- Buddhism
- Buddha claimants
- Maitreya claimants
- Inedia, the belief that some people can live without food
- Anorexia mirabilis, a form of spiritual self-starvation
