= Gainor Hughes =

Fasting woman (1745-1780)

Gainor Hughes (1745 – March 1780) was one of the fasting women or fasting girls of the eighteenth and nineteenth centuries. Such women became the subject of public fascination. Tales of women who claimed not to eat and sometimes not even to drink, for periods ranging from a few months to fifty years. These fasters were usually poor, of humble backgrounds, living in relatively isolated rural areas, often Scotland or Wales. Although several developed a reputation for piety over the course their fasts, none claimed extraordinary religious power. Their inability to eat appears to have been triggered by physiological "chance". Contemporary interest in Hughes centred on her fast of almost six years' duration, during which time she refused sustenance other than spring water sweetened with a small amount of sugar or occasionally with a drop of weak ale. Her story resurfaced again from the 1870s, possibly as a result of an increase in cases of fasting girls, including the well-known local case of Sara Jacob.

== Early life ==
Gainor Hughes was christened on 23 May 1745 at Llandderfel parish church, Merionethshire, Wales. She was the daughter of Hugh David, Bodelith, and his wife Catherine.

== Her fast ==
Gainor Hughes gained fame by allegedly fasting for almost six years, beginning in 1773 or 1774. During this period, she refused any substantial sustenance. The Chester Chronicle suggested the fast had originated in an illness which led to three days of unconsciousness, and to a subsequent dislike of the smell of meat. Unsurprisingly, her physical condition eventually reflected this shortage of nutrition. Gainor's contemporaries were preoccupied with the effect of her fast on her spiritual life. Along with the press, local bards and ballad-singers became interested in the case. The fact that Gainor survived without food was a miracle in the eyes of the balladeers, and a notable balladeer Elis Roberts (Elis y Cowper) set her alongside central Biblical characters who were saved from starvation and adversity through 'God's great miracles'. For Roberts and for his contemporary Jonathan Hughes of Llangollen, Gainor was living proof of the veracity of verse 4: 4 in Matthew's gospel, with its claim that man does not live by bread alone but rather by the words of God and his wondrous grace. In an intense piety, Gainor would shout and cry her praise of God, bearing witness through prayer to a spiritual world, Hughes reported. Elis Roberts likewise emphasized her readiness to pray and praise the Lord, morning, and evening. Ballads appeared consistently throughout the fast. Reports published in the Chester Chronicle suggest how Gainor may have become famous during her lifetime, with visitors travelling between forty and fifty miles to see her.

Later sources, including information apparently collected from elderly local people provides more detail about her abhorrence of food and its smell, and how every nook and cranny had to be blocked to prevent the steam from reaching her when soup was being boiled; or how she fainted after her sister Gwen came into her chamber with a loaf of white bread under her apron, so intolerable was the effect of the bread's smell.

== Death and legacy ==
Gainor Hughes never broke her fast and died in March 1780 aged 35. She was buried at Llandderfel cemetery on 14 March that year. After her death her story remained popular. It was notable enough to draw the attention of the artist Edward Pugh, who mentioned her in his posthumously published Cambria Depicta: A Tour through North Wales (1816). A new wave of interest surfaced from the 1870s onwards with a number of fasting girls receiving press. In 2010 a new stone to note her burial was placed in Llandderfel cemetery by a local heritage society.
