= Self-starvation =

Self-starvation may refer to:

- Anorexia mirabilis
- Anorexia nervosa
- Fasting girls
- Hunger strike
- Sallekhana
