= Prahlad Jani =

Indian breatharian monk (1929–2020)

Personal life
- Born: Prahlad Jani; 13 August 1929 Charada, India
- Died: 26 May 2020 (aged 90) Mehsana district, Gujarat, India
- Resting place: Gujarat, India
- Known for: Inedia
- Other name: Chunriwala Mataji

Religious life
- Religion: Hinduism

Prahlad Jani, also known as Mataji or Chunriwala Mataji (13 August 1929 ― 26 May 2020) was an Indian breatharian monk who claimed to have lived without food and water since 1940. He said that the goddess Amba sustained him. However, the findings of the investigations on him have been kept confidential and viewed with skepticism.

== Biography ==
Prahlad Jani was born on 13 August 1929 in Charada village in India (now in Mehsana district, Gujarat, India).

At the age of 12, Jani underwent a spiritual experience and became a follower of the Hindu goddess Amba. From that time, he chose to dress as a female devotee of Amba, wearing a red sari-like garment, jewellery and crimson flowers in his shoulder-length hair. Jani was commonly known as Mataji ("[a manifestation of] The Great Mother"). Jani believed that the Goddess provided him with water which dropped down through a hole in his palate, which allowed him to live without food or drink.

Since the 1970s, Jani had lived as a hermit in a cave in the forest in Gujarat. He died on 26 May 2020 at his native Charada. He was given samadhi in his ashram at Gabbar Hill near Ambaji on 28 May 2020.

== Investigations ==
Two observational studies and one imaging study of Jani have been conducted. The observational studies were one in 2003 and one in 2010, both involving Sudhir Shah, an eminent neurologist at the Sterling Hospitals in Ahmedabad, India. In both cases the investigators reportedly confirmed Jani's ability to survive healthily without food and water during the testing periods; neither study was submitted to a scientific journal. When questioned six days into the 2010 experiment, the DRDO spokesperson announced that the study's findings would be "confidential" until results were established. Uninvolved doctors and other critics have questioned the validity of the studies and stated the scientific fact that, although people can survive for days without food or water, it is not possible to survive for years, especially since glucose, a substrate critical to brain function, is not provided.

=== 2003 tests ===
In 2003, Sudhir Shah and other physicians at Sterling Hospitals, Ahmedabad, India observed Jani for 10 days. He stayed in a sealed room. Doctors said that he passed no urine or stool during the observation, but that urine appeared to form in the bladder. A hospital spokesperson said that Jani was physically normal, but noted that a hole in the palate was an abnormal condition. During the tests, Jani's weight dropped slightly.

=== 2010 tests ===
From 22 April until 6 May 2010, Prahlad Jani, then 82 years old, was again observed and tested by Dr Sudhir Shah and a team of 35 researchers from the Indian Defence Institute of Physiology and Allied Sciences (DIPAS), as well as other organizations. The director of DIPAS said that the results of the observations could "tremendously benefit mankind", as well as "soldiers, victims of calamities and astronauts", all of whom may have to survive without food or water for long durations. The tests were again conducted at Sterling Hospitals. Professor Anil Gupta of SRISTI, involved in monitoring the tests, described the team as being "intrigued" by Jani's kriyas apparently allowing him to control his body's physiological functions.

The team studied Jani with daily clinical examinations, blood tests, and scans. Round-the-clock surveillance was reportedly followed using multiple CCTV cameras and personal observation. The researchers say that Jani was taken out of the sealed room for tests and exposure to sun under continuous video recording.

After fifteen days of observation during which he reportedly did not eat, drink or go to the toilet, all medical tests on Jani were reported as normal. The doctors reported that although the amount of liquid in Jani's bladder fluctuated and that Jani appeared "able to generate urine in his bladder", he did not pass urine. Based on Jani's reported levels of leptin and ghrelin, two appetite-related hormones, DRDO researchers posited that Jani may be demonstrating an extreme form of adaptation to starvation and water restriction. DIPAS stated in 2010 that further studies were planned, including investigations into how metabolic waste material is eliminated from Jani's body, from where he gets his energy for sustenance, and how he maintains his hydration status.

=== 2017 - Brain Imaging Study - ===
Independent of DRDO studies, IIT Madras team has conducted an imaging study in 2017. They have collected Jani's brain images and measured the size of Pineal and Pituitary glands. The result of the imaging study shows that the size of Jani's Pineal and Pituitary glands are of the same order of a 10-year-old boy. The study results have been published in scientific journals.

=== Reactions ===
Michael Van Rooyen, director of the Harvard Humanitarian Initiative, dismissed the observation results as "impossible", observing that the bodies of profoundly malnourished people quickly consume their own body's resources, resulting in renal/liver failure, tachycardia and heart strain. A spokeswoman for the American Dietetic Association stated that, "The bottom line is that even fasting for more than a day can be dangerous. You need food to function." Nutrition researcher Peter Clifton also disagreed with study results, accusing the research team of "cheating" by allowing Jani to gargle and bathe, and stating that a human of average weight would die after "15 to 20 days" without water. People who avoid food and water to emulate mystical figures often die. Sanal Edamaruku characterized the experiment as a farce for allowing Jani to move out of the CCTV cameras' field of view, claiming that video footage showed Jani was allowed to receive devotees and to leave the sealed test room for sunbathing. Edamaruku also said that the gargling and bathing activities were insufficiently monitored. Edamaruku was denied access to the site where the tests were conducted in both 2003 and 2010, and accuses Jani of having "influential protectors" responsible for denying him permission to inspect the project during its operation, despite having been invited to join the test during a live television broadcast. The Indian Rationalist Association observed that individuals making similar claims in the past have been exposed as frauds.

In 2010, the prominent scientific skeptic James Randi criticized the studies performed by the Indian government, citing insufficient scrutiny of the subject. He also proposed that if Prahlad Jani could prove his claims, he would receive the One Million Dollar Paranormal Challenge prize.

== Television, video and public appearances ==
In 2006, The Discovery Channel aired a documentary called "The Boy with Divine Powers" featuring a five-minute interview with Jani and Shah. In 2010, the Independent Television Network (ITNA) posted an article and video featuring Prahlad Jani, commenting on the 2010 tests. In 2010 Prahlad Jani was featured in an Austrian documentary "Am Anfang war das Licht" (English title In the Beginning There Was Light).

In October 2010, the Italian television station Rai 2 broadcast a program named "Voyager" which presented an extensive report on Prahlad Jani and the tests.

In October 2011, Jani was the param pujya (master of ceremony) in a large shobha yatra (religious procession) held near Gandhinagar.
