= Ratnapur =

Ratnapur may refer to:

== India ==
- Ratnapur, Buldhana, a panchayat village in Buldhana District, Maharashtra, India
- A historic name for Latur, a city in Maharashtra, India
- A village in Jamkhed taluka, Ahmednagar district, Maharashtra
- A village in Bijapur district, Karnataka

== Nepal ==
- Ratnapur, Gandaki, Nepal, a market center in Chapakot Municipality
- Ratnapur, Kailali, Nepal, a village development committee
- Ratnapur, Lumbini, Nepal, a village development committee
- Ratnapur, Seti, Nepal, a village development committee

== See also ==
- Ratnapura, Sri Lanka
- Ratanpur (disambiguation)
- Ratnapuri (disambiguation)
