= Neelbad =

Neelbad may refer to:

- Neelbad (census code 482510), a village in Bhopal district Madhya Pradesh, India; located on the Bhopal-Sehore road, notable for several educational institutes
- Neelbad (census code 482470), a village in Bhopal district Madhya Pradesh, India; located near IISER Bhopal, between Rasuliya Pathar and Barkheda Salam
