= Llandderfel =

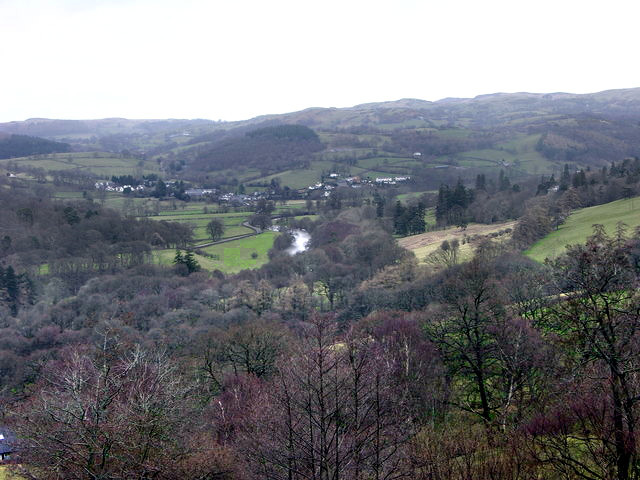
- Llandderfel and River Dee

- Location within Gwynedd
- Area: 114.1 km^{2} (44.1 sq mi)
- Population: 1,095 (2011)
  - Density: 10/km^{2} (26/sq mi)
- OS grid reference: SH980371
- Community: Llandderfel
- Principal area: Gwynedd
- Country: Wales
- Sovereign state: United Kingdom
- Post town: CORWEN
- Postcode district: LL21
- Post town: BALA
- Postcode district: LL23
- Dialling code: 01678
- Police: North Wales
- Fire: North Wales
- Ambulance: Welsh
- UK Parliament: Dwyfor Meirionnydd
- Senedd Cymru – Welsh Parliament: Dwyfor Meirionnydd
- List of places UK Wales Gwynedd 52.922°N 3.516°W Map of the community

Llandderfel is a village and a sparsely populated community in Gwynedd, Wales, near Bala, formerly served by the Llandderfel railway station. The community also includes the settlements of Glan-yr-afon, Llanfor, Cefnddwysarn and Frongoch. The Community population taken at the 2011 census was 1,095.

== Palé Hall ==
Palé Hall was built in 1871, on the site of an older manor house in Llandderfel. It was designed by Samuel Pountney Smith of Shrewsbury for Henry Robertson MP, a railway engineer and local landowner. The house was used as a military hospital in World War I and a home for evacuated children in World War II. The Robertson family sold the estate to the Duke of Westminster in the 1950s.

== St Derfel's Church ==
The parish church of Llandderfel is dedicated to Saint Derfel. It is part of the diocese of St Asaph and is mentioned in the Papal Registers of the late 15th century. Originally a Celtic Llan site, founded by Derfel in the early 6th century, the church was rebuilt probably in the early 16th century. The poet Dewi Havhesp is buried in the churchyard.

== Governance ==
An electoral ward in the same name exists. This ward stretches beyond the confines of Llandderfel with a population taken at the 2011 census of 1,511.

== Notable people ==
- Huw Cae Llwyd (born about 1431 – died after 1505), poet
- Gainor Hughes (1745 – 1780), fasting girl
- Edward Jones (Bardd y Brenin) (1752–1824), harpist.
- Dewi Havhesp (1831–1884), poet, noted especially for his englynion.
- Huw Derfel (1816–1890), author of the first mountain handbook in Welsh.
- Robert Jones Derfel (1824–1905), patriotic poet and early Socialist.
- Rees Davies (1938–2005), Chichelle Professor of Medieval History
