= Ratnapuri =

Ratnapuri may refer to:

- Ratnapuri, India
- Ratnapuri, Nepal

== See also ==
- Ratnapur (disambiguation)
