= Ratanpur, Bhopal (census code 482467) =

Ratanpur
- village
- Location within Madhya Pradesh Location within India
- Coordinates: 23.312129°N 77.213845°E
- Country: India
- State: Madhya Pradesh
- District: Bhopal
- Tehsil: Huzur

Population (2011)
  - Total: 957
- Time zone: UTC+5:30 (IST)
- ISO 3166 code: MP-IN
- Census code: 482467

Ratanpur is a village in the Bhopal district of Madhya Pradesh, India. It is located in the Huzur tehsil and the Phanda block.

It is located beside the road connecting Barkheda Salam (near IISER Bhopal) to Toomda.

== Demographics ==
According to the 2011 census of India, Ratanpur has 173 households. The effective literacy rate (i.e. the literacy rate of population excluding children aged 6 and below) is 68.28%.

Demographics (2011 Census)
	Total	Male	Female
Population	957	505	452
Children aged below 6 years	150	81	69
Scheduled caste	206	107	99
Scheduled tribe	48	28	20
Literates	551	342	209
Workers (all)	529	284	245
Main workers (total)	254	141	113
Main workers: Cultivators	75	44	31
Main workers: Agricultural labourers	11	6	5
Main workers: Household industry workers	58	30	28
Main workers: Other	110	61	49
Marginal workers (total)	275	143	132
Marginal workers: Cultivators	69	64	5
Marginal workers: Agricultural labourers	165	55	110
Marginal workers: Household industry workers	6	3	3
Marginal workers: Others	35	21	14
Non-workers	428	221	207
