= Inedia =

Belief that a person can live without food

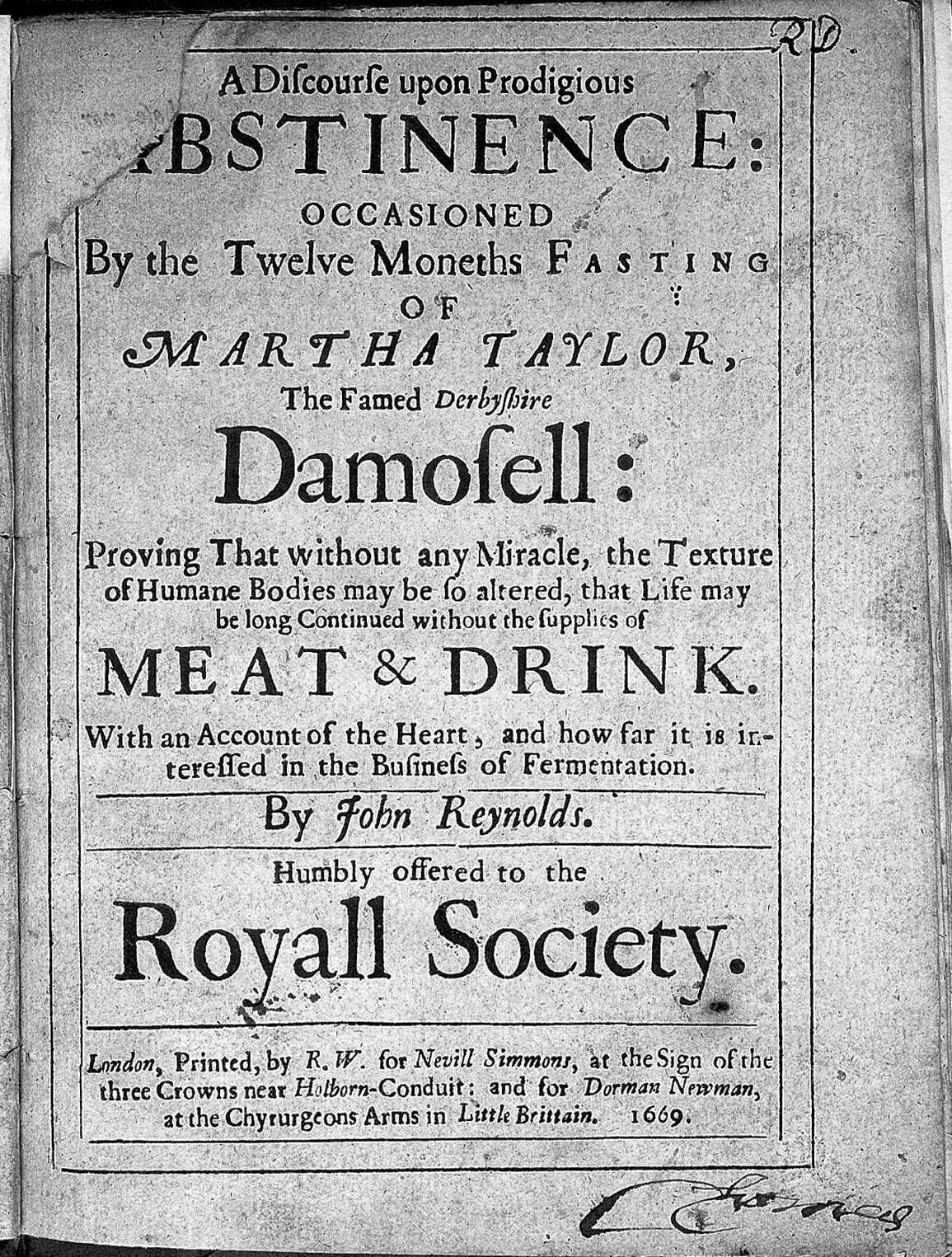
1669 report that claims a woman fasted for 12 months

Inedia (Latin for 'fasting') or breatharianism (/brɛˈθɛəriənɪzəm/ breth-AIR-ee-ən-iz-əm) is the claimed ability for a person to live without consuming food. It is a pseudoscientific practice, and several adherents of these practices have died from starvation or dehydration.

== Scientific assessment ==
Documented studies on the physiological effects of food restriction clearly show that fasting for extended periods leads to starvation, dehydration, and eventual death. In the absence of food intake, the body normally burns its own reserves of glycogen, body fat, and muscle. Breatharians claim that their bodies do not consume these reserves while fasting.

Some breatharians have submitted themselves to medical testing, including a hospital's observation of Indian mystic Prahlad Jani appearing to survive without food or water for 15 days. However, the hospital Jani attended has not published official documentation about the event. In other cases, people have attempted to survive on sunlight alone, only to abandon the effort after losing a large percentage of their body weight.

In a handful of documented cases, individuals attempting breatharian fasting have died. Scientific societies such as the British Dietetic Association strongly disadvise the breatharian diet, qualifying it as "dangerous", and stating that "the basic fact is we all need food and liquid in our diet to live."

== Alleged practitioners ==
=== Rosicrucianism ===
The 1670 Rosicrucian text Comte de Gabalis attributed the practice to the physician and occultist Paracelsus (1493–1541) who was described as having lived "several years by taking only one-half scrupule of Solar Quintessence". In this book, it is also stated that "Paracelsus affirms that He has seen many of the Sages fast twenty years without eating anything whatsoever."

=== Ram Bahadur Bomjon ("Bakji") ===
Ram Bahadur Bomjon is a Nepalese Buddhist monk who lives as an ascetic in a remote area of Nepal. Bomjon appears to go for long periods of time without ingesting either food or water. One such period was chronicled in a 2006 Discovery Channel documentary titled The Boy with Divine Powers, which reported that Bomjon neither moved, ate, nor drank anything during 96 hours of filming. The documentary makers were, however, prevented from filming Bomjon continuously for that period of time. His claims have never been empirically verified.

=== Prahlad Jani ("Mataji") ===
Prahlad Jani was an Indian sadhu who claimed to have lived without food and water for more than 70 years. Doctors at Sterling Hospital investigated his claims in Ahmedabad, Gujarat, in 2003 and 2010. The study concluded that Prahlad Jani was able to survive under observation for ten days without food and water, and had passed no urine or stool, with no need for dialysis. Interviews with the researchers speak of strict observation and relate that round-the-clock observation was ensured by multiple CCTV cameras. Jani was subjected to multiple medical tests. The research team could not comment on his claim of having been able to survive in this way for decades.

The case has attracted criticism, both after the 2003 tests and the 2010 tests. Sanal Edamaruku, president of the Indian Rationalist Association, criticized the 2010 experiment for allowing Jani to move out of a certain CCTV camera's field of view, meet devotees, and leave the sealed test room to sunbathe. Edamaruku stated that the regular gargling and bathing activities were not sufficiently monitored and accused Jani of having had some "influential protectors" who denied Edamaruku permission to inspect the project during its operation.

=== Jasmuheen ===
Jasmuheen (born Ellen Greve) was a prominent advocate of breatharianism in the 1990s. She said, "I can go for months and months without having anything at all other than a cup of tea. My body runs on a different kind of nourishment." Interviewers found her house stocked with food; Jasmuheen claimed the food was for her husband and daughter. In 1999, she volunteered to be monitored closely by the Australian television program 60 Minutes for one week without eating to demonstrate her methods.

Jasmuheen stated that she found it difficult on the third day of the test because the hotel room in which she was confined was located near a busy road, causing stress and pollution that prevented absorption of required nutrients from the air. "I asked for fresh air. Seventy per cent of my nutrients come from fresh air. I couldn’t even breathe," she said. On the third day, the test was moved to a mountainside retreat, where her condition continued to deteriorate. After Jasmuheen had fasted for four days, Berris Wink, president of the Queensland branch of the Australian Medical Association, urged her to stop the test.

According to Wink, Jasmuheen's pupils were dilated, her speech was slow, and she was "quite dehydrated, probably over 10%, getting up to 11%". Towards the end of the test, she said, "Her pulse is about double what it was when she started. The risks if she goes any further are kidney failure. 60 Minutes would be culpable if they encouraged her to continue. She should stop now." The test was stopped. Wink said, "Unfortunately there are a few people who may believe what she says, and I'm sure it's only a few, but I think it's quite irresponsible for somebody to be trying to encourage others to do something that is so detrimental to their health." Jasmuheen challenged the results of the program, saying, "Look, 6,000 people have done this around the world without any problem."

On 16 September 1999, Verity Linn, a former member of the Findhorn Foundation in Scotland, was found dead near Cam Loch in Sutherland after reportedly undertaking a prolonged fast associated with breatharianism. According to a diary found with her body, Linn had stopped eating and drinking as part of a spiritual "cleansing" ritual inspired by the teachings of Jasmuheen. Police stated that they believed Linn's fasting was a contributory factor in her death.

Jasmuheen was awarded the Bent Spoon Award by Australian Skeptics in 2000 ("presented to the perpetrator of the most preposterous piece of paranormal or pseudoscientific piffle"). She also won the 2000 Ig Nobel Prize for Literature for Living on Light. Jasmuheen claims that their beliefs are based on the writings and "more recent channelled material" from St. Germain. She stated that some people's DNA has expanded from 2 to 12 strands, to "absorb more hydrogen". When offered $30,000 to prove her claim with a blood test, she said that she did not understand the relevance as she was not referring to herself.

As of 2017, five deaths had been directly linked to breatharianism as a result of Jasmuheen's publications. Jasmuheen has denied any responsibility for three of the deaths.

=== Wiley Brooks ===
Wiley Brooks (1936–2016) was the founder of the Breatharian Institute of America. He was first introduced to the public in 1980 when he appeared on the TV show That's Incredible! Brooks stopped teaching shortly before his death in 2016 to "devote 100% of his time on solving the problem as to why he needed to eat some type of food to keep his physical body alive and allow his light body to manifest completely". Brooks claims to have found "four major deterrents" which prevented him from living without food: "people pollution", "food pollution", "air pollution", and "electro pollution".

In 1983, he was reportedly observed leaving a Santa Cruz 7-Eleven with a Slurpee, a hot dog, and Twinkies. He told Colors magazine in 2003 that he periodically breaks his fasting with a cheeseburger and a cola, explaining that when he's surrounded by junk culture and junk food, consuming them adds balance.

Brooks later claimed that "All McDonalds are constructed on properties that are protected by 5th Dimensional high energy/spiritual portals", encouraging the consumption of Diet Coke and McDonald's Double-Quarter-Pounder/with cheese meal ("It is also acceptable to combine 2 quarter-pounder with cheese burgers to make one double-quarter pounder if you can't get the double-quarter-pounder with cheese where you live"), and discouraging the consumption of "water of any kind". The idea of separate but interconnected 5D and 3D worlds was a major part of Brooks' ideology, and Brooks encouraged his followers to only eat these special 5D foods, as well as to meditate on a set of magical 5D words.

Brooks's institute has set various prices for prospective clients wishing to learn how to live without food, ranging from US$100,000 with an initial deposit of $10,000, to fifty billion dollars, to be paid via bank wire transfer with a preliminary deposit of $100,000, for a session called an "Immortality workshop". A payment plan was also offered. These charges were typically presented as limited time offers exclusively for billionaires.

=== Hira Ratan Manek ===
Hira Ratan Manek (1937–2022) claimed that since 18 June 1995, he lived on water and occasionally tea, coffee, and buttermilk. Manek stated that sungazing was the key to his health, citing yogis, ancient Egyptians, Aztecs, Mayas, and Native Americans as practitioners of the art. While he and his proponents stated that medical experts confirmed his ability to draw sustenance by gazing at the Sun, a method which came to be known as "HRM phenomenon" (by his initials), he was caught on camera eating a big meal in a San Francisco restaurant in the 2011 documentary Eat the Sun.

=== Ray Maor ===
In a television documentary produced by the Israeli television investigative show The Real Face (פנים אמיתיות), hosted by Amnon Levy, Israeli practitioner of inedia Ray Maor (ריי מאור) appeared to survive without food or water for eight days and eight nights. According to the documentary, he was restricted to a small villa and placed under constant video surveillance, with medical supervision that included daily blood testing. The documentary claimed Maor was in good spirits throughout the experiment; that he lost 7.5 kilograms (17 lb) after eight days; that blood tests showed no change before, during or after the experiment; and that cardiologist Ilan Kitsis from Tel Aviv Sourasky Medical Center was "baffled".

== Mythology and religion ==
=== Hinduism ===
Some Hindu religious texts contain accounts of saints and hermits practising what would be called inedia, breatharianism or Sustenance through Light in modern terms. In Valmiki's Ramayana, Book III, Canto VI, an account of anchorites and holy men is given, who flocked around Rama when he came to Śarabhanga's hermitage. These included, among others, the "...saints who live on rays which moon and daystar give" and "those ... whose food the wave of air supplies". In Canto XI of the same book, a hermit named Māṇḍakarṇi is mentioned: "For he, great votarist, intent – On strictest rule his stern life spent – ... – Ten thousand years on air he fed..." (English quotations are from Ralph T. H. Griffith's translation).

Paramahansa Yogananda's 1946 book Autobiography of a Yogi details two alleged historical examples of breatharianism, Hari Giri Bala and Therese Neumann.

There are claims that Devraha Baba lived without food.

Some breatharians claim that humans can be sustained solely by prana, the vital life force in Hinduism. According to Ayurveda, sunlight is one of the main sources of prana, and some practitioners believe that it is possible for a person to survive on sunlight alone.

=== Taoism ===
Bigu (grain avoidance) is a fasting technique with various different interpretations, from simply avoiding eating specific grains, to avoiding all grains, to eating no food at all, and drawing sustenance from gulps of air.

=== Jainism ===
There are varying types of fasts practised by followers of Jainism. Some Jain monks and laities continuously fast for months. These fasts last six months or even longer. A Jain monk, Sahaj Muni Maharaj, is said to have completed his 365-day fast on 1 May 1998. Another Jain monk Hansaratna Vijayji was said to have completed 423-day fast in 494 days in 2015. He had previously claimed to have fasted for 108 days in 2013 and for 180 days in 2014. Several others have claimed to have fasted for six months.

== Works ==
- In the Beginning There Was Light, a 2010 Austrian documentary on breatharianism
- Inedia, a 2024 drama film directed by Liz Cairns

== See also ==
- Angus Barbieri's fast, longest medically documented fast
- Anorexia mirabilis, Middle Ages
- Fasting girls, Victorian Era
- Kumbhaka, Yoga
- List of diets
- Scientific skepticism
- Sungazing
- Starvation diet
