= Neelbad (census code 482470) =

- village
- Location within Madhya Pradesh Location within India
- Coordinates: 23.308470°N 77.253879°E
- Country: India
- State: Madhya Pradesh
- District: Bhopal
- Tehsil: Huzur

Population (2011)
  - Total: 864
- Time zone: UTC+5:30 (IST)
- ISO 3166 code: MP-IN
- Census code: 482470

Neelbad is a village in the Bhopal district of Madhya Pradesh, India. It is located in the Huzur tehsil and the Phanda block. It is near IISER Bhopal, between Rasuliya Pathar and Barkheda Salam.

== Demographics ==
According to the 2011 census of India, Neelbad has 165 households. The effective literacy rate (i.e. the literacy rate of population excluding children aged 6 and below) is 35.2%.

Demographics (2011 Census)
	Total	Male	Female
Population	864	427	437
Children aged below 6 years	239	117	122
Scheduled caste	45	20	25
Scheduled tribe	42	20	22
Literates	220	121	99
Workers (all)	425	229	196
Main workers (total)	35	29	6
Main workers: Cultivators	23	21	2
Main workers: Agricultural labourers	5	5	0
Main workers: Household industry workers	0	0	0
Main workers: Other	7	3	4
Marginal workers (total)	390	200	190
Marginal workers: Cultivators	5	3	2
Marginal workers: Agricultural labourers	372	185	187
Marginal workers: Household industry workers	0	0	0
Marginal workers: Others	13	12	1
Non-workers	439	198	241
