= South Bangla Agriculture and Commerce Bank =

4th Generation Private commercial bank of Bangladesh

SBAC Bank PLC.
- Type: Public limited company
- Traded as: DSE: SBACBANK; CSE: SBACBANK
- Industry: Banking
- Founded: 28 April 2013
- Headquarters: BSC Tower, (5th - 16th Floor) 2-3 Rajuk Avenue,Motijheel, Dhaka-1000, Bangladesh
- Number of locations: 90 branches and 32 sub-branches in (October 2026)
- Area served: Bangladesh
- Key people: Engr. Md. Moklesur Rahman (Chairman); Mr. S. M. Mainul Kabir (Managing Director)
- Services: Banking services Consumer banking Corporate banking Agent banking Islamic banking Bangla Pay www.banglapay.org
- Net income: ▲
- Number of employees: 1242
- Subsidiaries: SBAC Bank Investment Ltd. sbacbsl.com/index.html
- Website: www.sbacbank.com

South Bangla Agriculture and Commerce Bank PLC. (SBAC Bank PLC.) is a private commercial bank headquartered in Dhaka, Bangladesh. It incorporated in 2013 as a banking company under Companies Act, 1994 and is regulated under the Banking Companies Act, 1991. The bank has network of 90 branches and 32 sub-branches around the country.

SBAC has a board of 19 members headed by Mr. Abu Zafar Mohammod Shofiuddin as chairman. Engr. Md. Moklesur Rahman acts as vice-chairman of the board of directors. Habibur Rahaman has been working as managing director and CEO (acting) of the banks. The bank is listed on the Dhaka Stock Exchange and Chittagong Stock Exchange. The bank faced a number of inquires in irregular loans in 2021.

== History ==
South Bangla Agriculture and Commerce Bank Limited started on 28 April 2013 obtaining license from Bangladesh Bank as a fourth generation private bank. It was founded by SM Amjad Hossain owner of Lockpur Fisheries. Abdul Mannan Chowdhury and Qazi Abdul Majid were the other major shareholders of the bank. Md Rafiqul Islam joined as the CEO and managing director of South Bangla Agriculture and Commerce Bank Limited.

In September 2017, Md Golam Faruque was appointed CEO and managing director of South Bangla Agriculture and Commerce Bank Limited.

In 2018, it became one of six banks where Titas Gas bills could be paid.

SM Amzad Hossain was reelected chairman of South Bangla Agriculture and Commerce Bank Limited in February 2019.

Tariqul Islam Chowdhury resigned in April as the managing director of the bank and was replaced by Mosleh Uddin Ahmed. In May, the bank listed on the Dhaka Stock Exchange. On 27 September 2021, Abdul Kadir Molla, Thermax Group, was elected chairman of South Bangla Agriculture and Commerce Bank Limited. It followed the resignation of SM Amzad Hossain, chairman of Lockpur Group and the founding chairman of the bank since 2013, and whose accounts were frozen. The National Board of Revenue was investigating tax evasion by Khulna Printing & Packaging Limited, a subsidiary of Lockpur Group. The Bangladesh Financial Intelligence Unit asked for the bank account information on SM Amzad Hossain and his family members to be frozen. He had arranged 400 million taka loan violating banking norms. South Bangla Agriculture and Commerce Bank Limited suspended deputy managing directors Md Kamal Uddin and Shafiuddin Ahmed and nine other officials of the bank following instructions from Bangladesh Bank which found them involved in irregular loans. The Anti-Corruption Commission sued SM Amzad Hossain and six others for embezzling 200 million taka from the South Bangla Agriculture and Commerce Bank Limited. Hossain fled the country after the investigation against him started and cases were filed subsequently. Islami Bank Bangladesh Limited called for the assets of Hossain to be auctioned. Tahmina Afroz, wife of married of Anwar Hossain Khan, sold her shares in the bank on the Dhaka Stock Exchange. Two shareholders, who are directors of Ratanpur Steel Re-Rolling Mills Limited, also sold their shares in the bank.

In August 2022, the Bangladesh Financial Intelligence Unit asked for the bank account information on Abdul Kadir Molla, chairman of South Bangla Agriculture and Commerce Bank Limited, over allegations that he had taken loans violation banking laws. The South Bangla Agriculture and Commerce Bank Limited celebrated the 76th birthday of Prime Minister Sheikh Hasina. In November, the bank donated blankets to the relief fund of Prime Minister Sheikh Hasina.

The bank has authorized capital of BDT 10 billion, while its paid-up capital is BDT 8.16 billion up to June 2022. Mr. Abu Zafar Mohammod Shofiuddin was elected chairman of South Bangla Agriculture and Commerce Bank Limited in August 2023.

The Bank donated 10 million BDT to Ashrayan Project–2 of Prime Minister Sheikh Hasina.
