= Sudhir V. Shah =

Indian neurologist

- Born: August 19, 1959 (age 66); Gujarat, India
- Occupations: Neurologist; Medical academic Writer
- Known for: Medical writings Writings on Jainism
- Awards: Padma Shri

Sudhir V. Shah is an Indian neurologist, professor and the head of the department of neurology at Smt. NHL Municipal Medical College, Ahmedabad. Holder of an MD in general medicine and a DM in neurology, he is associated with the Neurological Society of India, Indian Academy of Neurology and Association of Physicians of India as a member. He is known for his research on brain cells and books on neurology and Jainism which have reportedly been sold over 50,000 copies, the earnings of which have been donated to charities. He is a former chairman of the National Jain Doctor’s Federation as well as a director of neurosciences at Sterling Hospitals and has served as the honorary neurologist to the Governor of Gujarat. He has written several articles on neurology and spirituality which include Journey to Happiness and Peace, The Art and Science of Meditation, Diseases of The Brain and Nervous System, and Jainism: A Super Science and is a co-author of Meditation Must, a book detailing the medical aspects of meditation. The Government of India awarded him the fourth highest civilian honour of the Padma Shri, in 2016, for his contributions to medical science.

== See also ==
- Jainism in Gujarat
