= Jasmuheen =

Australian breatharian (born 1957)

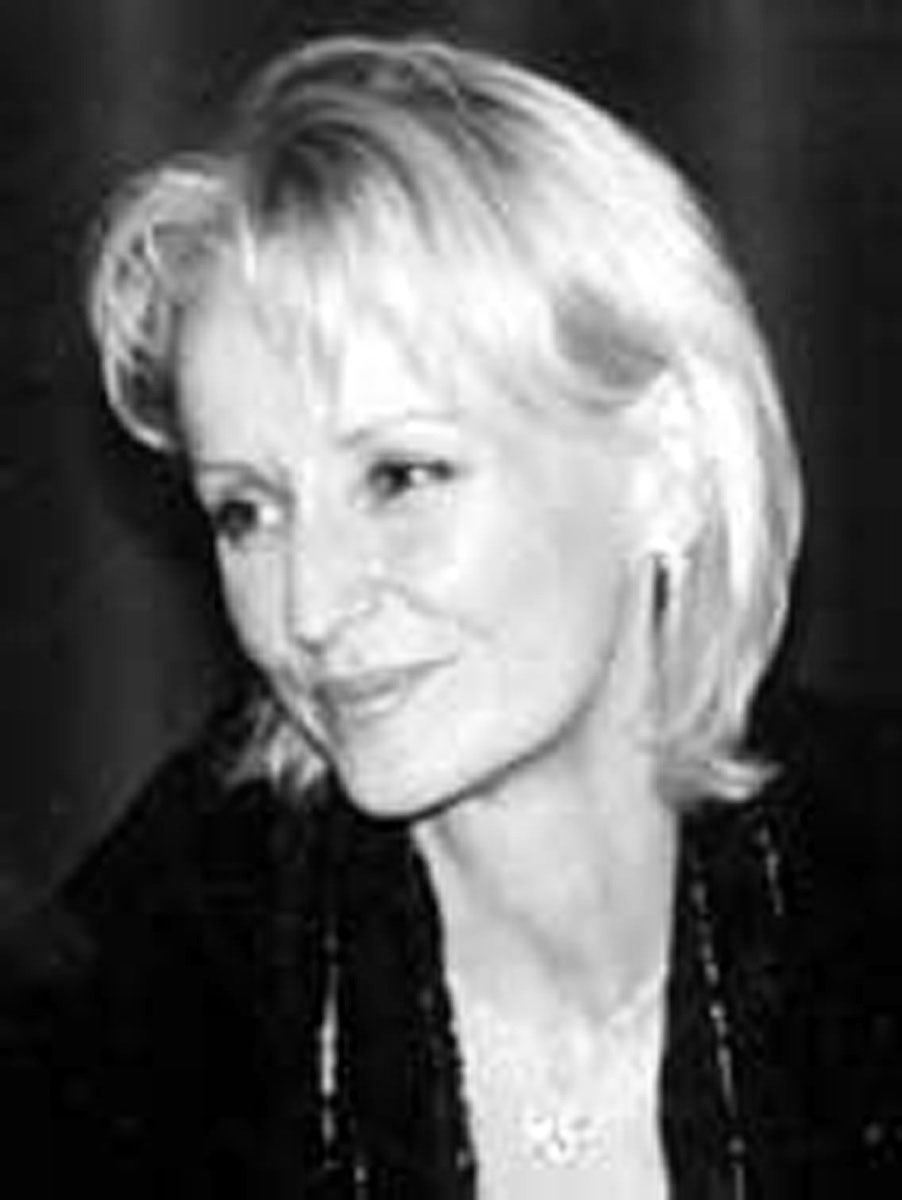
- Jasmuheen in 2008
- Born: Ellen Greve; 1957 (age 68–69); New South Wales, Australia

Jasmuheen (born Ellen Greve; 1957) is an Australian proponent of "pranic nourishment" or breatharianism, the alleged practice of living entirely without food and drink. She makes appearances at New Age conferences worldwide, has hosted spiritual retreats in Thailand and has released books and audio recordings. Her claims have been condemned by the scientific community as a dangerous pseudoscience.

== Early life ==
Jasmuheen was born in 1957 in New South Wales, Australia, to post-war Norwegian migrant parents.

== Breatharianism ==
Jasmuheen developed financial and business management skills working full-time in the finance industry. In 1992, she began combining her experience in business and finance with meditation, selling access to workshops and seminars on the topic and, by deed poll, changed her name to Jasmuheen.

The Australian television programme 60 Minutes challenged Jasmuheen to demonstrate how she could live without food and water. The supervising medical doctor, Beres Wenck, found that, after 48 hours, Jasmuheen displayed symptoms of acute dehydration, stress and high blood pressure. Jasmuheen claimed that this was a result of "polluted air". On the third day, she was moved to a mountainside retreat about 15 miles from the city, where she was filmed enjoying the fresh air, claiming she could now successfully practice inedia. But as filming progressed, Jasmuheen's speech slowed, her pupils dilated, and she lost over a stone (6 kg or 14 lb) in weight. After four days, she acknowledged that she had lost weight, but stated that she felt fine. Wenck stated: "You are now quite dehydrated, probably over 10%, getting up to 11%." The doctor continued: "Her pulse is about double what it was when she started. The risk if she goes any further is kidney failure." Jasmuheen's condition continued to deteriorate rapidly due to acute dehydration, despite her contrary insistence. Wenck concluded that continuing the experiment would ultimately prove fatal. The film crew agreed with this assessment and stopped filming.

Regarding her intake of food, Jasmuheen said: "Generally not much at all. Maybe a few cups of tea and a glass of water, but now and then if I feel a bit bored and I want some flavour, then I will have a mouthful of whatever it is I'm wanting the flavour of. So it might be a piece of chocolate or it might be a mouthful of a cheesecake or something like that." In the aftermath of the 60 Minutes broadcast, Kathy Marks noted in The Independent, "Visitors to her large villa in the prosperous Chapel Hill area of Brisbane invariably find her refrigerator generously stocked with food, all of it destined, she insists, for the stomach of her second husband, Jeff Ferguson, a convicted fraudster".

Jasmuheen has stated that she has lived on approximately 300 calories per day for the past fourteen years, maintaining full health through supplementing a fluid intake with "cosmic particles" or "micro-food", which she describes as prana. She has stated that she has not yet mastered the ability to be fluid-free for more than short periods.

Jasmuheen was awarded the Bent Spoon Award by Australian Skeptics in 2000 ("presented to the perpetrator of the most preposterous piece of paranormal or pseudoscientific piffle"). She was also awarded the 2000 Ig Nobel Prize for Literature for her book Pranic Nourishment – Living on Light, "which explains that although some people do eat food, they don't ever really need to."

Jasmuheen maintains that some of her beliefs are based on the writings and "more recent channelled material" of the Count of St Germain. She states that her DNA expanded from 2 to 12 strands to take up more hydrogen. The extra strands of DNA have not been scientifically verified. When offered $30,000 to prove her claim with a blood test, Jasmuheen stated "you cannot view spiritual energy under a microscope". She claimed that such a challenge would be a deliberate attack on her beliefs, and that she refuses to act as an example of her alleged paranormal attributes.

In 2005, James Randi offered her the James Randi Educational Foundation US$1 million prize to demonstrate her claims. In 2010, she appeared in the documentaries 3 Magic Words and In the Beginning There Was Light.

== Deaths of followers ==
As of 2012, five deaths had been directly linked to breatharianism and Jasmuheen's publications. Jasmuheen has denied any responsibility for the deaths.

Lani Marcia Roslyn Morris, a 53-year-old Melbourne resident, died in 1999 while attempting the breatharian "diet" advocated by Jasmuheen. Jim Vadim Pesnak, 63, and his wife Eugenia, 60, were jailed for six years and two years, respectively, on charges of manslaughter for their involvement in the death of Morris. Pesnak had delayed seeking medical attention. Referring to this case, Jasmuheen commented that Morris's practice of inedia perhaps was "not coming from a place of integrity and did not have the right motivation".

Jasmuheen offered a similar defence in response to the death of Verity Linn, who died of hypothermia and dehydration due to a lack of nutrition while practising inedia in Scotland, her diary mentioning Jasmuheen's teachings. Linn's body was found in a tent. In 2012, it was reported that a Swiss woman died of starvation after having attempted to survive purely on light, as taught in one of Jasmuheen's books. In 2017, a Dutch woman living in a household of four practitioners of breatharianism inspired by Jasmuheen died under mysterious circumstances. The three remaining members of the household are suspected of withholding the malnourished woman adequate medical care.

In 1999, Michelle Shirley, spokeswoman for the Cult Information Centre, told the BBC that the centre had been contacted five times in the previous 12 months by concerned friends and family members of Breatharians and that "although Breatharianism is not strictly a cult, the centre has been monitoring its activities". She added, "We are particularly concerned about any implication that if it doesn't work, it is the person's fault. That implies there is nothing wrong with the Breatharians' teachings."

In the end of 2017, 22-year-old German citizen Finn Bogumil died on the Caribbean island of Dominica, reportedly of fasting. According to witnesses, he was not eating or drinking for several days ahead of his death, and had told friends and family members of his plans to live only on sunlight. German news station NDR also released a documentary about this case in March 2019.

Jasmuheen has written that "If you haven't found the light that will nourish you, you may have the intention to become a breatharian, but in fact you may be putting yourself through food deprivation. There is one known case where a person died when trying to become a breatharian."

== Publications ==
- The Prana Program – Eliminating Global Health & Hunger Challenges
- Harmonious Healing and the Immortal's Way
- The Law of Love & Its Fabulous Frequency of Freedom
- The Food of Gods
- In Resonance
- Pranic Nourishment – Living on Light
- Ambassadors of Light – World Health & World Hunger Project
- Divine Radiance: On the Road With the Masters of Magic
- Four Body Fitness: Biofields & Bliss
- Co-creating Paradise
- The Madonna Frequency Planetary Peace Program

== See also ==
- List of Ig Nobel Prize winners
