= In the Beginning There Was Light =

2010 film by P. A. Straubinger

In The Beginning There Was Light
- Official US-Release Poster "In The Beginning There Was Light"
- Directed by: P. A. Straubinger
- Written by: P. A. Straubinger
- Produced by: Helmut Grasser
- Starring: Prahlad Jani, Rupert Sheldrake, Amit Goswami, Brian Josephson, Jasmuheen, Zinaida Baranova, Michael Werner, Robert Jahn, Dean Radin
- Release dates: May 13, 2010 (Marché du Film); September 17, 2010 (Austria); October 28, 2010 (Germany); April 11, 2013 (United States)
- Running time: 90 minutes
- Country: Austria
- Languages: English, German, Gujarati, Mandarin, Russian

In The Beginning There Was Light is a documentary film by Austrian director P. A. Straubinger on the subject of inedia. Straubinger visits several people who supposedly nourish themselves with "light" and tries to find possible explanations on how inedia might work. Straubinger researched inedia for ten years. This led to the film's production, which took five years. The film premiered on May 13, 2010 at the Marché du Film.

== Plot ==
P. A. Straubinger first encounters inedia in a television documentary about Nicholas of Flüe, a 15th-century ascetic who was reported to have lived 19 years without eating. Later, Straubinger starts research on the internet and subsequently has the desire to meet people practising inedia. He travels through different countries and interviews people who claim to nourish themselves with light, vitality, Prana or Qi, among them Jasmuheen, Michael Werner and "Mataji" Prahlad Jani. Straubinger also consults different people from classical and alternative medicine and science and looks for explanatory models for inedia. Straubinger conveys that for him, the materialistic world view of modern science falls short.

Straubinger's conclusion is credulous and contradicted by the available evidence. Some breatharians have submitted themselves to medical testing, including a hospital's observation of Indian mystic Prahlad Jani appearing to survive without food or water for 15 days, and an Israeli breatharian appearing to survive for eight days on a television documentary. In a handful of documented cases, individuals attempting breatharian fasting have died. In other cases, people have attempted to survive on sunlight alone, only to abandon the effort after losing a large percentage of their body weight.

== Cultural impact ==
According to Straubinger, In The Beginning There Was Light polarized critics, and the controversy contributed to the film's financial success.

In the German Das Erste talk show Menschen bei Maischberger and two TV-discussions on ORF in Austria, critics warned that the film could motivate people to stop eating. Straubinger responded that this would be a complete misunderstanding of his film, repeatedly stating that he does not want to motivate anybody to stop eating but he would advocate eating consciously without asserting any particular nutritional ideology. Straubinger says that the film shows cases of starvation related to the Breatharian Process communicated by the Australian author Jasmuheen, and also features proponents and experts who warn not to make dangerous self-experiments or try a breatharian lifestyle out of "spiritual ambition".

In Switzerland, according to the national newspaper Tages-Anzeiger, a woman who saw the film attempted to live on sunlight alone, and died in January 2012. The film's official website calls articles that implicate a responsibility of In The Beginning There Was Light for the woman's death a hoax, and presents as support for this claim a facsimile of an e-mail that the responsible state attorney wrote to the director in which he confirms that no third party could be made responsible for the death of the woman and an adequate causality between the film and the death could be definitely excluded.

== Awards and festivals ==
- Austrian Ticket / Austrian Film Award (in German) – Prize for the most successful Austrian Film of the Year
- Bergen International Film Festival – Official Selection
- Munich International Film Festival – Official Selection
- Vukovar Film Festival – Official Selection
