= Huw Cae Llwyd =

- Born: c.1431 Llandderfel, Dee Valley, Merioneth, Wales
- Died: c.1504 Llanuwchllyn, Wales
- Occupation: Poet
- Language: Welsh
- Notable works: Cywydd y Wennol, Cywydd XXI, Cywydd XLIV–XLV
- Children: Ieuan ap Huw Cae Llwyd

Huw Cae Llwyd (c.1431 - c.1504) was a Welsh language poet from Llandderfel in the Dee valley of Merioneth as he witnessed in his Cywydd y Wennol (Poem to the Swallow).

Early in his life he travelled to south east Wales, where he sang the bardic praises of the Uchelwyr or leading families, the Gams, Havards, Vaughans and Herberts, enjoying their wealthy patronage in houses such as Llinwent, Pontwilym, Berthir, Tretower, Mitchel Troy. Many of his Yorkist patrons succumbed to the domestic strife of the times, not least after the Battle of Banbury (1469). Later Huw praised Sir Rhys ap Thomas, Henry VII's agent on his victorious march to Bosworth.

Unlike his contemporaries in north - east Wales Huw Cae Llwyd rarely appealed to monastic patrons. An exception is Cywydd XXI, asking for a mount from the abbess of the Cistercian convent at Llanll^yr (Ceredigion) for Sir William Herbert of Raglan.

Heavenly patrons however abound: the Saints of Breconshire (Cywydd XLV), those of Rome (XXIX) where he journeyed with his son (in 1475), Jesus and the Saints (XLV). Cywydd XLIV invokes Christ's Passion.

Huw describes Brecon, its surroundings and the Rood Screen and Cross in the Priory Church (today Brecon Cathedral).

Another poem describes a bardic contest at Tretower.

Huw transmitted his expertise to his son, Ieuan ap Huw Cae Llwyd. In old age he returned to the Dee valley, where he was buried in the poetic cemetery at Llanuwchllyn (thus keeping company with Llawdden, Madog Benfrâs, Siôn Ceri, Ieuan Llwyd Brydydd, Hywel Swrdwal, Ieuan ap Rhydderch and Tudur Penllyn).

== Sources ==
Leslie Harries, Gwaith Huw Cae Llwyd ac Eraill, University of Wales Press, Cardiff, 1953

Y Bywgraffiadur hyd 1940, Cymmrodorion 1953, p. 377
