= Toomda =

- village
- Location within Madhya Pradesh Location within India
- Coordinates: 23.3127491°N 77.1902122°E
- Country: India
- State: Madhya Pradesh
- District: Bhopal
- Tehsil: Huzur
- Elevation: 489 m (1,604 ft)

Population (2011)
  - Total: 5,413
- Time zone: UTC+5:30 (IST)
- ISO 3166 code: MP-IN
- 2011 census code: 482472

Toomda is a village in the Bhopal district of Madhya Pradesh, India. It is located in the Huzur tehsil and the Phanda block.

== Demographics ==
According to the 2011 census of India, Toomda has 1086 households. The effective literacy rate (i.e. the literacy rate of population excluding children aged 6 and below) is 68.19%.

Demographics (2011 Census)
	Total	Male	Female
Population	5413	2815	2598
Children aged below 6 years	785	389	396
Scheduled caste	1684	880	804
Scheduled tribe	50	27	23
Literates	3156	1905	1251
Workers (all)	2562	1539	1023
Main workers (total)	1479	1139	340
Main workers: Cultivators	644	523	121
Main workers: Agricultural labourers	599	414	185
Main workers: Household industry workers	8	8	0
Main workers: Other	228	194	34
Marginal workers (total)	1083	400	683
Marginal workers: Cultivators	235	48	187
Marginal workers: Agricultural labourers	781	314	467
Marginal workers: Household industry workers	17	9	8
Marginal workers: Others	50	29	21
Non-workers	2851	1276	1575
