= Ratanpur, Raebareli =

Ratanpur
- Village
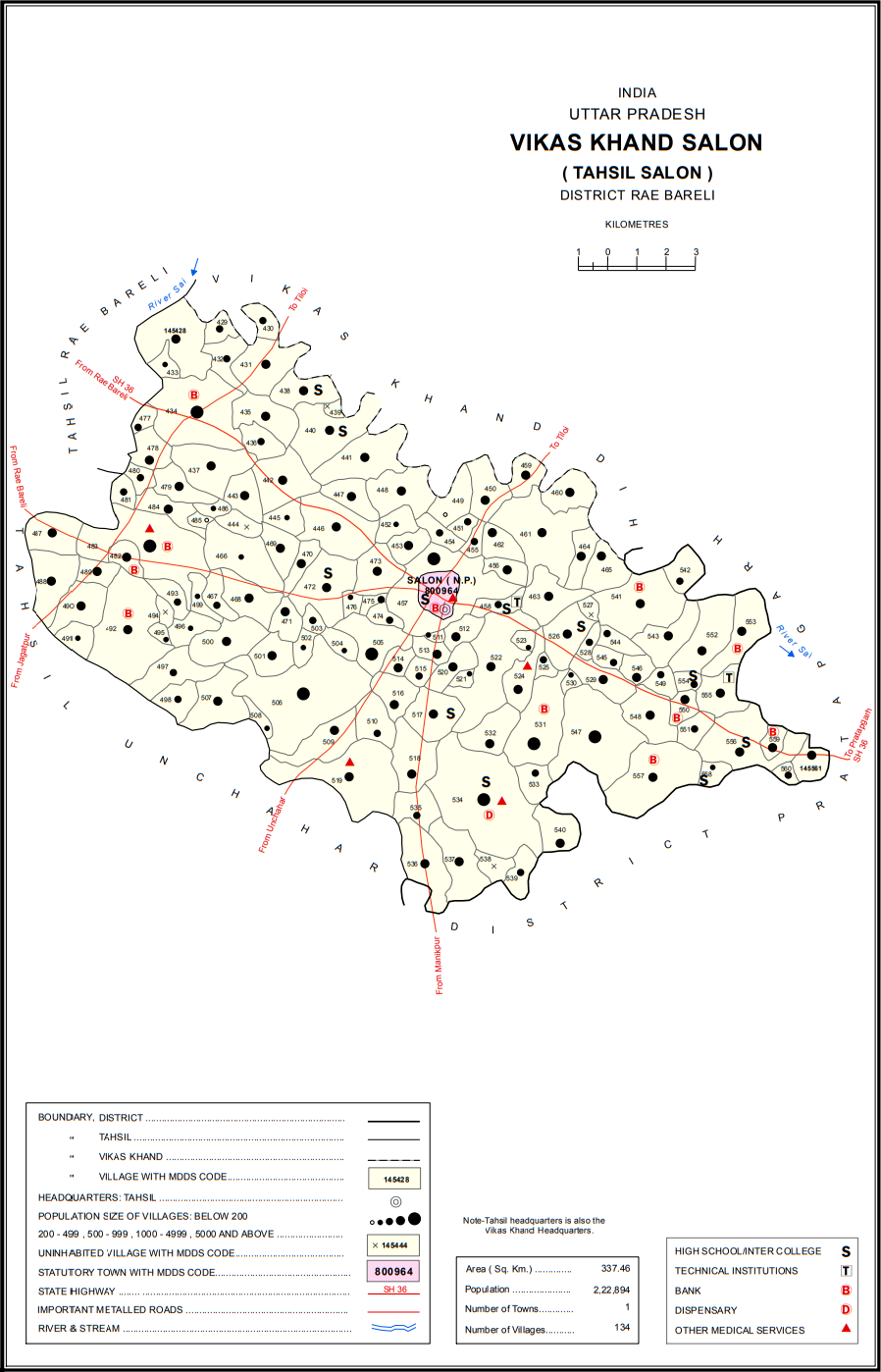
- Map showing Ratanpur (#454) in Salon CD block

- Location in Uttar Pradesh, India
- Coordinates: 26.042481°N 81.456444°E
- Country India: India
- State: Uttar Pradesh
- District: Raebareli

Area
  - Total: 1.082 km^{2} (0.418 sq mi)

Population (2011)
  - Total: 844
  - Density: 780/km^{2} (2,020/sq mi)

Languages
  - Official: Hindi
- Time zone: UTC+5:30 (IST)
- PIN: 229127
- Vehicle registration: UP-35

Ratanpur is a village in Salon block of Rae Bareli district, Uttar Pradesh, India. It is located 3 km from Salon, the block and tehsil headquarters. As of 2011, Ratanpur has a population of 844 people, in 128 households. It has no schools and no healthcare facilities and it hosts neither a permanent market nor a periodic haat.

The 1961 census recorded Ratanpur as comprising 2 hamlets, with a total population of 281 people (142 male and 139 female), in 59 households and 58 physical houses. The area of the village was given as 331 acres.

The 1981 census recorded Ratanpur as having a population of 396 people, in 81 households, and having an area of 127.89 hectares. The main staple foods were given as wheat and juwar.
