= Ratanpur, Bhopal (census code 482555) =

Ratanpur Ratanpur Sadak
- village
- Location within Madhya Pradesh Location within India
- Coordinates: 23.1376°N 77.4985°E
- Country: India
- State: Madhya Pradesh
- District: Bhopal
- Tehsil: Huzur

Population (2011)
  - Total: 6,208
- Time zone: UTC+5:30 (IST)
- ISO 3166 code: MP-IN
- Census code: 482555

Ratanpur is a village in the Bhopal district of Madhya Pradesh, India. It is located in the Huzur tehsil and the Phanda block, beside the Bhopal-Bhojpur road.

The Kanha Fun City is located near this village.

== Demographics ==
According to the 2011 census of India, Ratanpur has 1450 households. The effective literacy rate (i.e. the literacy rate of population excluding children aged 6 and below) is 89.83%.

Demographics (2011 Census)
	Total	Male	Female
Population	6208	3239	2969
Children aged below 6 years	740	390	350
Scheduled caste	533	269	264
Scheduled tribe	159	83	76
Literates	4912	2678	2234
Workers (all)	1991	1650	341
Main workers (total)	1907	1602	305
Main workers: Cultivators	246	200	46
Main workers: Agricultural labourers	36	29	7
Main workers: Household industry workers	28	20	8
Main workers: Other	1597	1353	244
Marginal workers (total)	84	48	36
Marginal workers: Cultivators	12	3	9
Marginal workers: Agricultural labourers	6	4	2
Marginal workers: Household industry workers	1	0	1
Marginal workers: Others	65	41	24
Non-workers	4217	1589	2628
