= Neelbad (census code 482510) =

- village
- Location within Madhya Pradesh Location within India
- Coordinates: 23.193448°N 77.343074°E
- Country: India
- State: Madhya Pradesh
- District: Bhopal
- Tehsil: Huzur

Population (2011)
  - Total: 4,282
- Time zone: UTC+5:30 (IST)
- ISO 3166 code: MP-IN
- Census code: 482510

Neelbad is a village in the Bhopal district of Madhya Pradesh, India. It is located in the Huzur tehsil and the Phanda block.

Neelbad is located on the Bhopal-Sehore road. Several educational institutes including Gargi Institute of Science and Technology, Bal Bharti Public School, Billabong High International School and Delhi Public School are located here.

== Demographics ==
According to the 2011 census of India, Neelbad has 894 households. The effective literacy rate (i.e. the literacy rate of population excluding children aged 6 and below) is 73.39%.

Demographics (2011 Census)
| | Total | Male | Female |
|---|---|---|---|
| Population | 4282 | 2235 | 2047 |
| Children aged below 6 years | 700 | 347 | 353 |
| Scheduled caste | 944 | 490 | 454 |
| Scheduled tribe | 538 | 270 | 268 |
| Literates | 2629 | 1496 | 1133 |
| Workers (all) | 1481 | 1104 | 377 |
| Main workers (total) | 1146 | 892 | 254 |
| Main workers: Cultivators | 81 | 64 | 17 |
| Main workers: Agricultural labourers | 107 | 76 | 31 |
| Main workers: Household industry workers | 38 | 30 | 8 |
| Main workers: Other | 920 | 722 | 198 |
| Marginal workers (total) | 335 | 212 | 123 |
| Marginal workers: Cultivators | 42 | 28 | 14 |
| Marginal workers: Agricultural labourers | 76 | 35 | 41 |
| Marginal workers: Household industry workers | 19 | 12 | 7 |
| Marginal workers: Others | 198 | 137 | 61 |
| Non-workers | 2801 | 1131 | 1670 |
