= Sarah Jacob =

Welsh supposed "fasting girl"

- Born: 12 May 1857; Lletherneaudd, near Pencader
- Died: 17 December 1869 (aged 12)
- Parents: Evan Jacob (father); Hannah Jacob (mother)

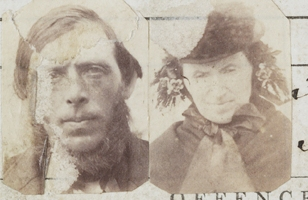
Evan and Hannah Jacob, her parents

Sarah Jacob (12 May 1857 – 17 December 1869) was a Welsh child, one of the best-known of a number of so-called fasting girls of the 19th century in the United Kingdom and the United States.

== Biography ==
Sarah Jacob was born at Lletherneaudd, near Pencader, Carmarthenshire, the daughter of a farmer. Among her family, she was known by the pet name "Sal". From the age of ten, she was said to have gone without food for long periods but without any apparent effect on her health. Her parents began to receive visitors and to display the child to them, claiming that she had not eaten for many months; by the time she died, she was said to have gone without food for a total of 113 weeks. When the news of her supposed fasting reached the national press, an article on the subject was published in The Lancet, and eventually a team of four nurses was sent to the house to observe her and see whether she was secretly eating and drinking. They began their observations on 9 December 1869, and the girl died just over a week later. During the period the nurses were present, no one attempted to feed her. An autopsy performed after her death found generally healthy anatomy and fat tissue, as well as faeces low in her intestines, indicating that she had been consuming food up until the start of the observation period.

== Criminal charges and conviction ==
In July 1870, Sarah's parents, Evan and Hannah Jacob, were brought to trial at Carmarthenshire Assizes, accused of manslaughter. They were monoglot Welsh speakers, and the court proceedings had to be translated for them. They pleaded not guilty, but were convicted and received prison sentences.

== Fictional portrayals ==
The life and death of Sarah Jacob have been featured in various works of fiction, including the Welsh-language novel Sarah Arall (1982), by Aled Islwyn, and a play by Gwenlyn Parry, entitled Sal. Emma Donoghue's 2016 novel, The Wonder, and the film of the same name based upon it, take much of their inspiration from the Sarah Jacob case.
