= Ratnapur, Buldhana =

Village in Maharashtra

Ratnapur
- Village
- Location within Maharashtra Location within India
- Coordinates: 20°07′41″N 076°39′39″E
- Country: India
- State: Maharashtra
- District: Buldhana District
- Taluka: Mehkar
- Elevation: 457 m (1,499 ft)

Population (2011)
  - Total: 510

Languages
  - local: Ahirani
  - official: Marathi
- Time zone: UTC+5:30 (IST)
- ISO 3166 code: IN-MH

Ratnapur is a panchayat village in Mehkar Taluka of Buldhana District in Maharashtra State, India. It is located west of the Gondala Dam Reservoir. The nearest town is Mehkar to the west-northwest, about 14 kilometres (8.7 mi) by road, 3.6 km southwest to Risod Road (route MH SH 206) and then northwest to Mehkar. The nearest train station is in Mehkar.
