= Anorexia mirabilis =

Near-starvation religious fasting

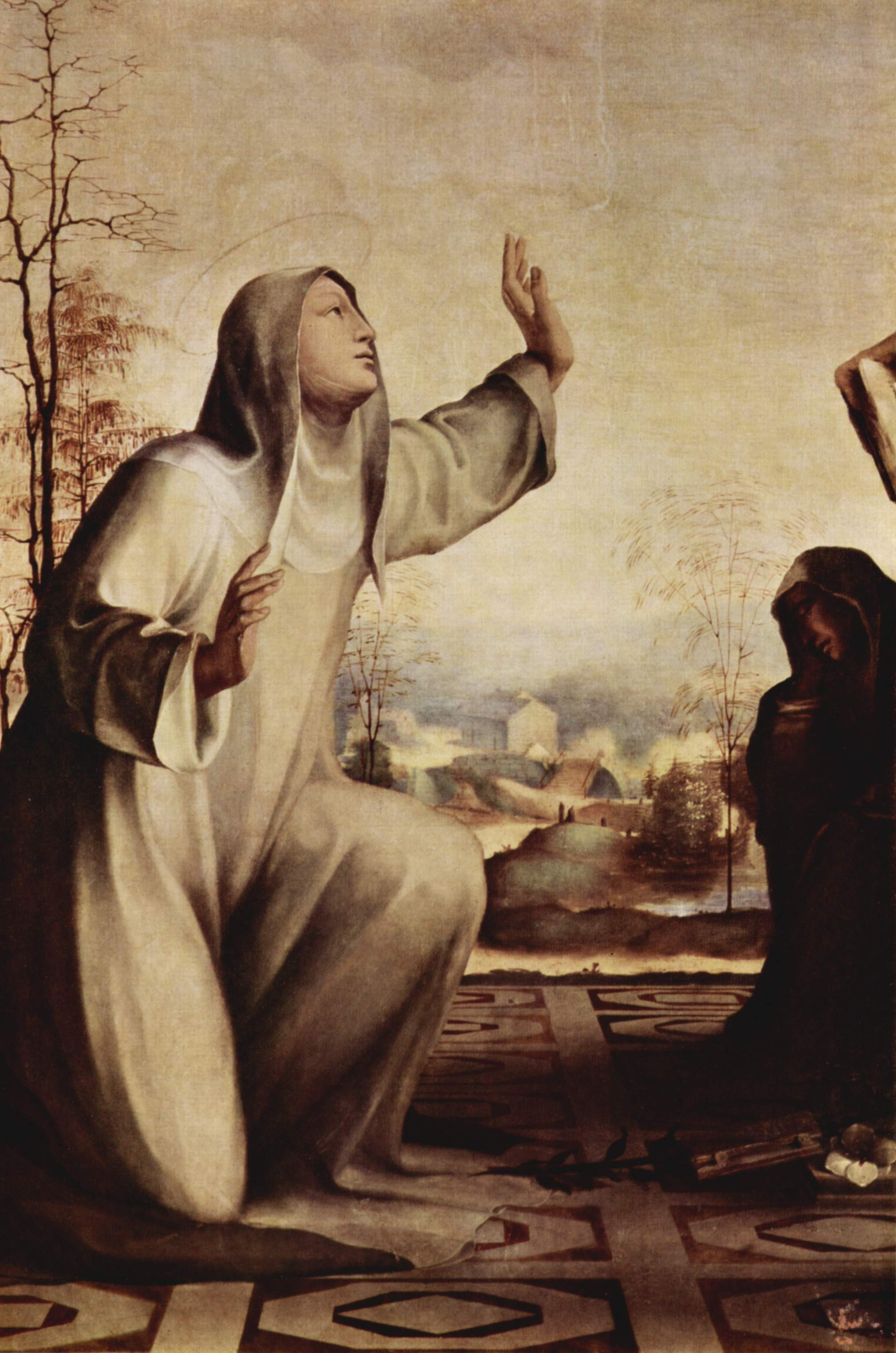
Catherine of Siena

Anorexia mirabilis, also known as holy anorexia or inedia prodigiosa or colloquially as fasting girls, is an eating disorder, similar to that of anorexia nervosa, that was common in, but not restricted to, the Middle Ages in Europe, largely affecting Catholic nuns and religious women. Self-starvation was common among religious women, as a way to imitate the suffering of Jesus in his torments during the Passion, as women were largely restricted to causing themselves voluntary pain by fasting, whereas holy men experienced suffering through physical punishment.

== Overview ==
=== Etymology ===
Anorexia mirabilis comes from the Latin meaning "miraculously inspired loss of appetite", whereas inedia prodigiosa means "great starvation".

=== Description ===
Anorexia mirabilis is primarily characterized by the refusal to eat, resulting in starvation, malnutrition, and oftentimes death. It differs from anorexia nervosa in that the disease is associated with religion as opposed to personal aesthetics, although this behavior was usually not approved by religious authorities as a holy one. Though anorexia mirabilis is, by definition, connected to religion, particularly Catholicism, those who experience it have been known to defy the orders of their religious superior to cease fasting, and their refusal to eat sometimes preceded their involvement in religious activities. People with anorexia mirabilis engaged in worrisome and bizarre behaviors designed to cause them pain, so that they might be reminded of Jesus Christ's suffering, and desired to appear unattractive in hopes of avoiding marriage and sexual contact. Inedia refers to the claimed ability for a person to live without consuming food.

The self-starvation practice of anorexia mirabilis was a behavior only adopted by women, particularly in the Middle Ages, as a way to imitate the suffering of Jesus in his torments during the Passion, as women preferred to experience this voluntary pain by fasting, whereas holy men experienced suffering through physical punishment. For this reason, they were often colloquially called "fasting girls", as there were no "fasting boys". This colloquial naming became the most common one in the Victorian era, with anorexia mirabilis being the term used only in medical circles.

Documentation exists regarding about two thirds of the holy women officially regarded by the Roman Catholic Church as saints, blesseds, venerables, or servants of God and who lived after 1200 AD, showing that more than half of these displayed clear signs of anorexia, with extensive and highly reliable documentation being available for about two dozen of these.

=== History ===
The earliest reported case of anorexia mirabilis is St. Wilgefortis, an uncanonized, legendary, Catholic princess who reportedly lived sometime between the 8th century and 10th century in Galicia, who starved herself and took a vow of chastity to avoid an arranged marriage. She asked God to make her ugly. Her suitor rejected her based on her appearance and so, as punishment for sabotaging the union, her father, the king of Portugal, had her crucified. For her suffering, she was unofficially venerated by Catholics.

Though the disorder was most prominent during the Middle Ages, modern cases exist. In 2014 medical researchers published an article about an unidentified woman in her sixties, born in Chicago, Illinois, who had experienced anorexia mirabilis. The woman entered a convent at the age of 13 and began to restrict her eating in hopes of achieving sainthood.

=== Notable cases ===
- Pelagia of Antioch was a Christian saint and hermit in the 4th or 5th century who died as a result of extreme asceticism, which had emaciated herself to the point she could no longer be recognized.
- Marie of Oignies (1177–1213) went to great lengths to cause herself physical pain, wanting to suffer as Jesus Christ had. She deprived herself of sleep. When she did eat, which was very little, she favored bread so stale that it would cause her gums to bleed. She made the choice to live in poverty despite being from a wealthy family, and abstained from sex despite being married. Like other cases of anorexia mirabilis, she eventually refused to eat any food other than the consecrated Hosts, and died at the age of 36.
- Wilgefortis of Portugal was a legendary Portuguese infanta who took a vow of virginity and began to starve herself to avoid marriage. She reportedly prayed to be made ugly, which resulted in her attaining an unsightly countenance, which people likely assumed to be a work of God. She was ultimately crucified. She was later venerated as a saint within the Catholic church.
- Catherine of Siena (1347–1380) was known to fast for long periods of time. Towards the end of her life, when her condition was at its worst, the only food she consumed was a single consecrated Host given to her as part of the daily Eucharist. She defied orders from her religious superiors to eat, claiming she was too ill to do so. In the month before she died, at the age of 33, she lost the use of her legs and her ability to swallow. In addition to restricting her food intake, Catherine was known to use insert sticks into her throat in order to activate her gag reflex and induce vomiting, as someone with bulimia nervosa would do.
- Columba of Rieti (1467–1501) bears a number of similarities to Catherine of Siena, including the cutting of her hair to avoid an arranged marriage and the refusal to eat prior to her involvement in religious work. Like Catherine, towards the end of her life, Columba restricted her food consumption to only what was given to her as part of the daily Eucharist and died at the age of 34. She wore a hairshirt, and slept on thorns.
- Therese Neumann (1898–1962) drank no water and ate no food other than The Holy Eucharist from 1926 until her death, despite her "stocky build".
- Jane (born c. 1948) was a woman from Chicago, United States, who began to restrict her eating at the age of 13 in hopes of being a nun and later, a saint. Her weight worried those at the convent, and she was dismissed from her religious training due to concerns over her health. Her malnutrition caused amenorrhea and likely affected her development, as she grew to be only 4' 10" tall, but did not experience any form of dwarfism. At the age of 66, she weighed only 60 pounds.

== Comparing anorexia mirabilis and anorexia nervosa ==
Anorexia mirabilis has in many ways, both similarities to and clear distinctions from the more modern, well-known "anorexia nervosa".

In anorexia nervosa, people usually starve themselves to attain a level of thinness, as a way of dealing with sexual or other trauma, undiagnosed mental illness, or as a form of self harm. It is also typically, but not always, associated with body image distortion. In comparison, anorexia mirabilis was frequently coupled with other ascetic practices, such as lifelong virginity, flagellant behavior, the donning of hairshirts, sleeping on beds of thorns, and other assorted penitential practices. It was largely a practice of Catholic women, who were often known as "miraculous maids".

The anorexia nervosa of the 20th century has historical correlates in the religiously inspired cases of anorexia mirabilis in female saints, such as Catherine of Siena (1347–1380) in whom fasting denoted female holiness or humility and underscored purity. The investigation of anorexia nervosa in the 20th century has focused on the psychological, physiological, and various other factors.

Medieval scholar Caroline Walker Bynum (Holy Feast and Holy Fast: The Religious Significance of Food to Medieval Women, 1988) argues that anorexia mirabilis, rather than misdiagnosed anorexia, was a legitimate form of self-expression, with motives set in contrast to the modern disease paradigm. She considers cases such as that of Julian of Norwich and other Christian anchorites, as using fasting as a legitimate means for communing with Christ.

American social historian Joan Jacobs Brumberg suggests in Fasting Girls: The History of Anorexia Nervosa (1987) that anorexia mirabilis no longer exists, not because the motives of those who starve themselves have changed, but because the paradigms for coding these behaviors have shifted. If a young woman were to make the decision to self-starve as a means to communicate with Christ, healthcare professionals would code her as having anorexia nervosa, regardless of her motives.

Whether or not there is historical continuity between anorexia mirabilis and anorexia nervosa is a subject of debate with both medieval historiographers and the psychiatric community. Some have argued that there is historical continuity between the two conditions. Others maintain that anorexia mirabilis should be comprehended as a distinct medieval form of female religious piety, within the historical context of such societies.

Anorexia mirabilis can also be considered a way to become more masculine in a staunchly patriarchal society. Female desert fathers were considered more holy than their male counterparts because their strict ascetic diets had stripped them of traditional signals of femininity, such as breasts. This can be compared to modern instances of anorexia nervosa among transgender individuals; diagnoses are higher among transgender individuals than cisgender individuals in the modern world. Nagata, Ganson and Austin suggest this is due to body dysmorphia.

== Historical instances ==
Anorexia mirabilis was frequently accompanied by behaviors most medical professionals today would find worrisome and dangerous. Angela of Foligno was known to eat the scabs of the poor and Catherine of Siena once drank pus from the sore of a sick woman.

Many women refused all food except for the holy Eucharist, signifying not only their devotion to God and Jesus, and demonstrating, to them, the separation of body and spirit. That the body could exist for extended periods without nourishment gave people of the time a clear picture of how much stronger, and therefore how much more important, the spirit was. It mattered not in popular opinion that the reported periods of female fasting were impossibly long, from months to many years, and added to the allure of this very specifically female achievement. Walker-Bynum suggests that intensive fasting was also a means to gain control in a staunchly patriarchal society.

Marie of Oignies (1167–1213) reportedly lived as a hermit, wore only white, and cut off pieces of her body to expunge her desire. Both she and Beatrice of Nazareth claimed that the smell of meat made them vomit, and that the slightest whiff of food would cause their throats to close up entirely.

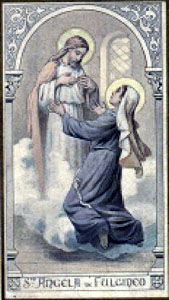
Angela of Foligno

Both Angela of Foligno (1248–1309) and Catherine of Siena (1347–1380) were reportedly anorexia mirabilis sufferers.

In the fourteenth century, celibacy and fasting were considered signs of spiritual purity. Ritualistic fasting was both a means to avoid gluttony, one of the seven deadly sins, and to atone for past sins. Catherine of Siena initially fasted as a teenager to protest an arranged marriage to her late sister Bonaventura's husband. Bonaventura had taught this technique to Catherine, refusing to eat until her husband showed better manners. Fasting then was a means of exercising some control, taking power back for the individual and is similar to one of the underlying factors in anorexia nervosa today. Thus, women could gain more freedom and respect remaining virgins, than they would becoming wives. Catherine managed to pursue her interests in theology and papal politics, opportunities less likely available to a wife and mother. She purportedly lived for long intervals on practically no food except the Eucharist, leading to her death at 33 years old from starvation and emaciation. Catherine's disgust of sweet food can be compared to modern sufferers of anorexia nervosa, and her drinking and enjoying of pus is an example of altered gustory perspective.

Any additional food she was forced to eat she would expel through vomiting induced by pushing a twig or small branch down her throat. Catherine of Siena is often cited as the most notable example of anorexia mirabilis, as her hagiography details a perception of food which can be correlated to modern anorexia nervosa. In 2014, James C. Harris used Catherine as a parallel to Miss K.R., one of the first people to be diagnosed with anorexia nervosa.

In 1387, Blessed Pierre de Luxembourg died at the age of 17 due to a combination of exhaustion from anorexia and fever.

A gang of would-be rapists got as far as removing the clothing of Columba of Rieti (1467–1501), but they retreated as she had mutilated her breasts and hips so thoroughly with spiked whipping chains that they were unable or unwilling to continue. Columba did eventually starve herself to death.

== Perceived benefits ==
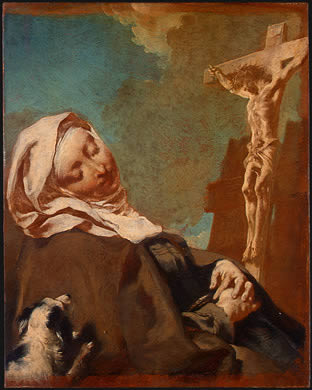
Saint Margaret of Cortona

Many of these women felt that they possessed at least some measure of spiritual enlightenment from their asceticism. They variously said they felt "inebriation" with the sacramental wine, "hunger" for God, and conversely, that they sat at the "delicious banquet of God". Margaret of Cortona (1247–1297) believed she had extended communications with God himself, and Columba of Rieti believed her spirit "toured the holy land" in visions.

Virtually every one of these women apparently believed herself to be, or was believed by others to be, possessed of some level of psychic prowess. These women's exercises in self-denial and suffering did yield them a measure of fame and notoriety. They were said to alternately be able to make a feast out of crumbs, exude oil from their fingertips, heal with their saliva, fill barrels with drink out of thin air, lactate even though virginal and malnourished, and perform other miracles of note.

The practice of anorexia mirabilis faded out during the Renaissance, when it began to be seen by the Church as heretical, socially dangerous, or possibly even Satanically inspired. It managed to survive in practice until nearly the 20th century, when it was overtaken by its more popularly known counterpart, anorexia nervosa.

== 21st century ==
Contemporary accounts of anorexia mirabilis do exist, most notably that of a fundamentalist Christian girl in Colombia, as reported by medical anthropologist Carlos Alberto Uribe.

== Works ==
- The Wonder (film), a 2022 film based on the historical novel of that title by Emma Donoghue

== See also ==
- Emaciation
- Fasting girls, Victorian era
- Female hysteria

== Sources ==
- Bell, Rudolph M. (June 15, 1987). Holy Anorexia. University of Chicago Press.
- Brumberg, Joan Jacobs (October 10, 2000). Fasting Girls: The History of Anorexia Nervosa (Subsequent ed.). Vintage.
- Bynum, Caroline Walker (January 7, 1988). Holy Feast and Holy Fast: The Religious Significance of Food to Medieval Women (New ed.). University of California Press.
- Vandereycken, W. (July 1, 1994). From Fasting Saints to Anorexic Girls: The History of Self-Starvation. NYU Press.
