= Ratua Ratanpur =

- village
- Location within Madhya Pradesh Location within India
- Coordinates: 23.4587113°N 77.4185584°E
- Country: India
- State: Madhya Pradesh
- District: Bhopal
- Tehsil: Berasia
- Elevation: 498 m (1,634 ft)

Population (2011)
  - Total: 2,752
- Time zone: UTC+5:30 (IST)
- ISO 3166 code: MP-IN
- 2011 census code: 482304

Ratua Ratanpur is a village in the Bhopal district of Madhya Pradesh, India. It is located in the Berasia tehsil.

== Demographics ==
According to the 2011 census of India, Ratua Ratanpur has 491 households. The effective literacy rate (i.e. the literacy rate of population excluding children aged 6 and below) is 61.75%.

Demographics (2011 Census)
| | Total | Male | Female |
|---|---|---|---|
| Population | 2752 | 1460 | 1292 |
| Children aged below 6 years | 522 | 279 | 243 |
| Scheduled caste | 640 | 334 | 306 |
| Scheduled tribe | 298 | 169 | 129 |
| Literates | 1377 | 821 | 556 |
| Workers (all) | 1263 | 803 | 460 |
| Main workers (total) | 959 | 644 | 315 |
| Main workers: Cultivators | 101 | 91 | 10 |
| Main workers: Agricultural labourers | 95 | 65 | 30 |
| Main workers: Household industry workers | 12 | 8 | 4 |
| Main workers: Other | 751 | 480 | 271 |
| Marginal workers (total) | 304 | 159 | 145 |
| Marginal workers: Cultivators | 62 | 33 | 29 |
| Marginal workers: Agricultural labourers | 199 | 108 | 91 |
| Marginal workers: Household industry workers | 10 | 1 | 9 |
| Marginal workers: Others | 33 | 17 | 16 |
| Non-workers | 1489 | 657 | 832 |
