= Śarabhanga =

Sage in the Ramayana

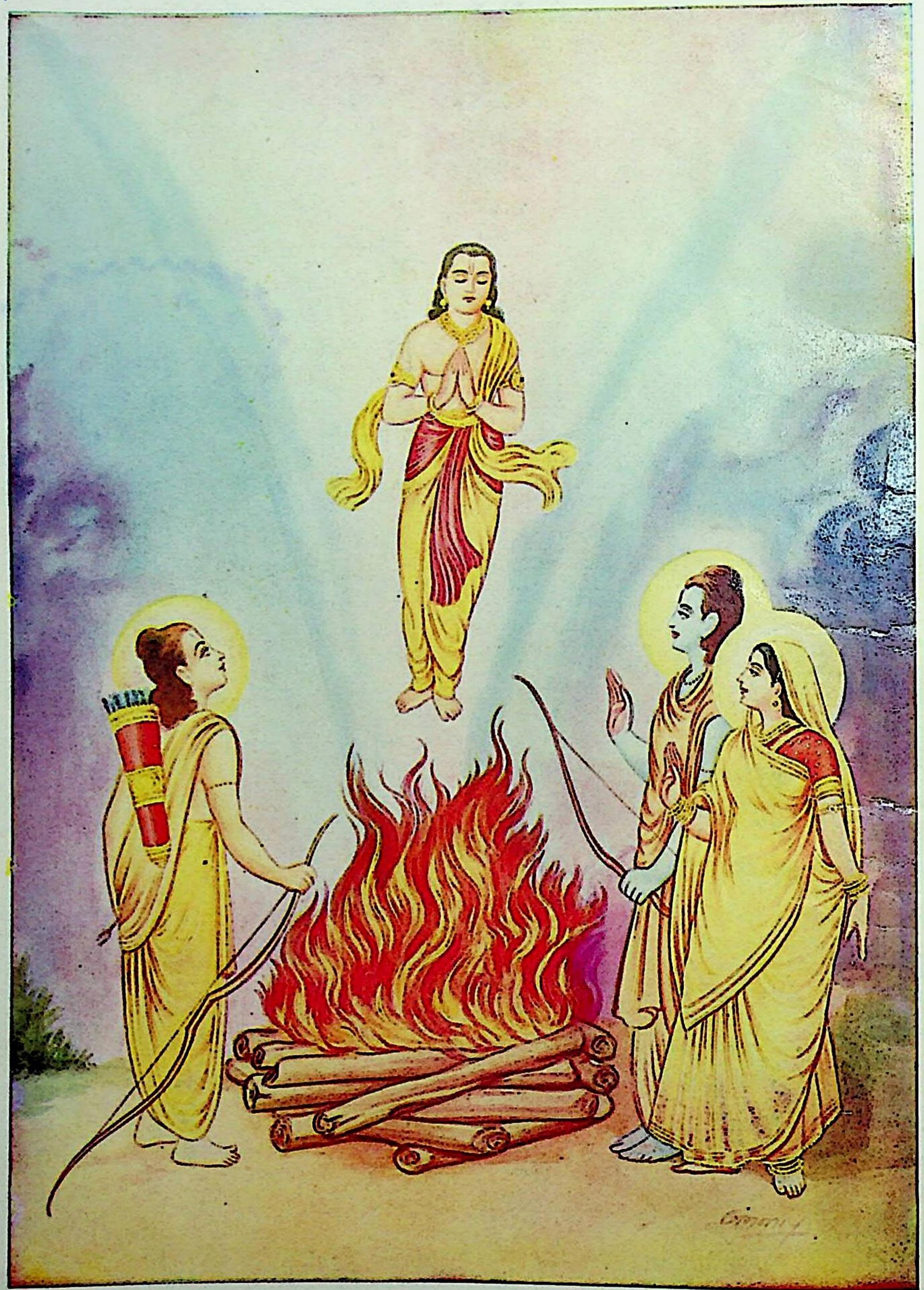
- Śarabhanga rises towards the heavens from the fire
- Texts: Ramayana

Śarabhanga (Sanskrit: शरभङ्ग, romanized: Śarabhaṅga) is a sage and anchorite mentioned in Book III (Aranya Kanda) of the Ramayana. He is visited by Rama during the latter's journey through the Dandaka forest. Prior to Rama's visit, Indra appears at his hermitage in order to take the sage to the abode of Brahmaloka. Śarabhanga's last wish was to see Rama before leaving the mortal world. After seeing Rama and performing the necessary rites, the sage performs self-immolation by throwing his old body to the funeral pyre, and a youthful ethereal form rises towards the heavens.
