= Rasooliya Pathar =

- village
- Location within Madhya Pradesh Location within India
- Coordinates: 23.325292°N 77.246134°E
- Country: India
- State: Madhya Pradesh
- District: Bhopal
- Tehsil: Huzur
- Panchayat: Rasuliya Pathar

Population (2011)
  - Total: 852
- Time zone: UTC+5:30 (IST)
- ISO 3166 code: MP-IN
- Census code: 482469

Rasooliya Pathar is a village in the Bhopal district of Madhya Pradesh, India. It is located in the Huzur tehsil and Phanda block.

== Demographics ==
According to the 2011 census of India, Rasooliya Pathar has 204 households. The effective literacy rate (i.e. the literacy rate of population excluding children aged 6 and below) is 62.76%.

Demographics (2011 Census)
	Total	Male	Female
Population	852	432	420
Children aged below 6 years	143	73	70
Scheduled caste	211	108	103
Scheduled tribe	60	32	28
Literates	445	262	183
Workers (all)	480	250	230
Main workers (total)	413	243	170
Main workers: Cultivators	77	70	7
Main workers: Agricultural labourers	166	80	86
Main workers: Household industry workers	2	2	0
Main workers: Other	168	91	77
Marginal workers (total)	67	7	60
Marginal workers: Cultivators	3	2	1
Meagre workers: Agricultural labourers	58	3	55
Marginal workers: Household industry workers	1	0	1
Marginal workers: Others	5	2	3
Non-workers	372	182	190
