= Ratnapuri, Nepal =

Coordinates: 27°20′N 85°3′E

Ratnapuri, Nepal रतनपुरी
- Village Development Committee
- Interactive map of Ratnapuri, Nepal
- Country: Nepal
- Zone: Narayani Zone
- District: Bara District

Population (1991)
  - Total: 6,463
- Time zone: UTC+5:45 (Nepal Time)

Ratnapuri is a town under Nijgadh Municipality in Bara District in the Narayani Zone of south-eastern Nepal. At the time of the 1991 Nepal census it had a population of 6,463 persons living in 1167 individual households.
