= Ratanpur Group =

- Formation: 1984
- Headquarters: Chittagong, Bangladesh
- Region served: Bangladesh
- Official language: Bengali
- Revenue: Tk 700 crore US$90 million (2021)
- Website: www.ratanpurgroup.com

Ratanpur Group (Bengali: রতনপুর গ্রুপ) is a Bangladeshi diversified conglomerate based in Chittagong. It is mostly known for its flagship company, Ratanpur Steel Re-Rolling Mills Limited (RSRM).

== History ==
Ratanpur Group was established in 1984 with the creation of Ratanpur Steel Re-Rolling Mills Limited (RSRM).

In August 2015, Bangladesh Bank approved the rescheduling of a 6.91 billion taka loan from Janata Bank to Ratanpur Group.

Ratanpur Group requested Bangladesh Bank to reschedule a 1.21 billion taka loan from Trust Bank Limited.

In 2018, Ratanpur Group and RSRM both defaulted on paying back their loan installments. Maksudur Rahman, managing director of Ratanpur Group, is also the director of South Bangla Agriculture and Commerce Bank. He said they failed to pay back the loan as the installment amount was not "practical". The group filed a writ petition against being declared a loan defaulter with the Bangladesh High Court.

Ratanpur Group had failed to pay 29 installments but was able to secure a verdict from the Bangladesh High Court that prevented them from being labeled a defaulter. It sought to reschedule their loans from Bangladesh Bank after Modern Steel Mills failed to pay back its loan. It reduced the issue price of RSRM. RSRM made 1 billion taka through issuing right shares on the Dhaka Stock Exchange.

In February 2020, Ratanpur Steel Re-rolling Mills (RSRM) saw a decline in their profits following low demand. In December 2020, The Business Standard mentioned Ratanpur Real Estate as one of a handful of companies that were illegally cutting hills in Chittagong.

On 31 March 2021, the Bangladesh Power Development Board severed electric connection to two steel plants of Ratanpur Group over the non-payment of a 400 million taka electricity bill.

== Businesses ==
- Ratanpur Jute Spinners Limited
- Ratanpur Shipping Services Limited
- Modern Steel Mills Limited
- Ratanpur Real Estate Limited
- Ratanpur Poultry and Agro Products Limited
- M. Rahman Steel Mills Limited
- Sapphire Corporation Limited
- Ratanpur Steel Re-Rolling Mills Limited
- Ratanpur Shipping Lines Limited
- Ratanpur Ship Re-cycling Industries Limited
