= Joan Jacobs Brumberg =

American social historian

Joan Jacobs Brumberg (born April 29, 1944) is an American social historian and writes and lectures in the fields of women's history and medical history.

== Career ==
Brumberg is a social historian that writes and lectures in the fields of women's history and medical history. Her first appointment at Cornell University (1979) was in Women's Studies and Human Development. From that point, her research, teaching and writing have been interdisciplinary and focused on gender. She is a Professor Emerita of Cornell University, and lectures and writes about the experiences of adolescents through history until the present day. In the subject area of Gender Studies, she has written about boys and violence, and girls and body image.

Her first book, Mission for Life: The Judson Family and American Evangelical Culture (1978) won Honorable Mention from The Society of Church History.

Her 1987 book, Fasting Girls: The Emergence of Anorexia Nervosa as A Modern Disease won four major disciplinary awards: the Berkshire Book Prize (in women's history); the John Hope Franklin Prize ( in American Studies), the Eileen Basker Prize (in medical anthropology) and the Watson Davis Prize (in history of Science writing). Book Riot included it as one of the 100 best books in the history of medicine.

The Body Project: A History of American Girls (1997) was based on diaries written by adolescents from the pre Civil War Era until 1980s. Although the author admired certain Victorian protections for girls, she also urged a new code of sexual ethics for a post virginal age. The book received special recognition from Voice of Youth Advocates. Brumberg has also worked collaboratively with photographer Lauren Greenfield on Girl Culture (2002) and Thin (2006).

In light of the contemporary debates over the juvenile death penalty, she wrote Kansas Charley: The Boy Murderer (2004) which explored the case of an immigrant adolescent murderer who was hanged in Cheyenne, Wyoming in 1898. Brumberg's research shows boys in early adolescence are not psychologically developed enough to be liable for their actions to the extent of an adult. Her work was used in arguments against the juvenile death penalty.

Brumberg was a John Simon Guggenheim Fellow and also had awards from the Rockefeller Foundation and the National Endowment for the Humanities. She was twice a fellow at the MacDowell Colony and is a fellow of the Society for American Historians. Brumberg was named a Stephen Weiss Presidential Fellow and Professor, an award given for excellence in undergraduate teaching.
