= Barkheda Salam =

- village
- Location within Madhya Pradesh Location within India
- Coordinates: 23.2838931°N 77.2570388°E
- Country: India
- State: Madhya Pradesh
- District: Bhopal
- Tehsil: Huzur
- Elevation: 523 m (1,716 ft)

Population (2011)
  - Total: 2,043
- Time zone: UTC+5:30 (IST)
- ISO 3166 code: MP-IN
- 2011 census code: 482471

Barkheda Salam is a village in the Bhopal district of Madhya Pradesh, India. It is located in the Huzur tehsil and the Phanda block.

== Demographics ==
According to the 2011 census of India, Barkheda Salam has 394 households. The effective literacy rate (i.e. the literacy rate of population excluding children aged 6 and below) is 68.34%.

Demographics (2011 Census)
	Total	Male	Female
Population	2043	1049	994
Children aged below 6 years	350	167	183
Scheduled caste	384	206	178
Scheduled tribe	0	0	0
Literates	1157	730	427
Workers (all)	1003	571	432
Main workers (total)	848	515	333
Main workers: Cultivators	582	332	250
Main workers: Agricultural labourers	172	109	63
Main workers: Household industry workers	7	4	3
Main workers: Other	87	70	17
Marginal workers (total)	155	56	99
Marginal workers: Cultivators	37	13	24
Marginal workers: Agricultural labourers	87	25	62
Marginal workers: Household industry workers	0	0	0
Marginal workers: Others	31	18	13
Non-workers	1040	478	562
