= Fasting girl =

Claim of special powers

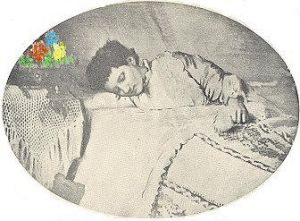
Mollie Fancher, the "Brooklyn Enigma"

A fasting girl was one of a number of young Victorian era girls, usually pre-adolescent, who claimed to be able to survive over indefinitely long periods of time without consuming any food or other nourishment. In addition to refusing food, fasting girls claimed to have special religious or magical powers.

The ability to survive without nourishment was attributed to some saints during the Middle Ages, including Catherine of Siena and Lidwina of Schiedam, and regarded as a miracle and a sign of sanctity. Numerous cases of fasting girls were reported in the late 19th century. Believers regarded such cases as miraculous.

In some cases, the fasting girls also exhibited the appearance of stigmata. Doctors, however, such as William A. Hammond ascribed the phenomenon to fraud and hysteria on the part of the girl. Historian Joan Jacobs Brumberg believes the phenomenon to be an early example of anorexia nervosa.

== Mollie Fancher ==
Mary J. "Mollie" Fancher (1848–1916), otherwise known as the "Brooklyn Enigma", was well known for her claim of not eating or eating very little for extended periods of time. She attended a reputable school and, by all reports, was an excellent student. At age 16, she was diagnosed with dyspepsia. At around the age of 19, reports came out that she had abstained from eating for seven weeks.

It was after two accidents, in 1864 and 1865, that she became famous for her ability to abstain from food. As a result of the accidents, Mollie Fancher lost her ability to see, touch, taste, and smell. She claimed to have powers that involved her being able to predict events as well as to read without the ability of sight.

By the late 1870s, she was claiming to eat little or nothing at all for many months. Her claim to abstinence from food lasted for 14 years. Doctors and people in the public began to question her abilities and wished to perform tests to determine the truthfulness of her claims. The claims to abstinence were never verified and she died in February 1916.

== Sarah Jacob ==
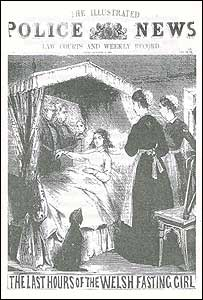
Sarah Jacob.

A case that led to a death and arrests was that of Sarah Jacob (May 12, 1857 – December 17, 1869), the "Welsh fasting girl", who claimed not to have eaten any food at all after the age of ten. A local vicar, initially skeptical, became convinced that the case was authentic and Jacob enjoyed a long period of publicity, during which she received numerous gifts and donations from people who believed she was miraculous.

Doctors were becoming increasingly skeptical about her claims and eventually proposed that she be monitored in a hospital environment to see whether her claims about fasting were true. In 1869, her parents agreed for a test to be conducted under strict supervision by nurses from Guy's Hospital. The nurses were instructed not to deny Jacob food if she asked for it, but to see that any she received was observed and recorded. After two weeks, she was showing clear signs of starvation.

The vicar told the parents that she was failing and that the nurses ought to be sent away so that she could get food. The parents refused and continued to refuse even when informed that their daughter was dying, insisting that they had frequently seen her like this before and that lack of food had nothing to do with her symptoms. Jacob died of starvation a few days later and it was found that she had actually been consuming very little amounts of food secretly, which she could no longer do under medical supervision. Her parents were convicted of manslaughter and sentenced to hard labour.

== Other fasting girls ==
Another case was that of New Jersey's Lenora Eaton in 1881. Reputable citizens in Eaton's town promoted her as someone who had "lived without eating". During these times, Eaton was marked as a "special person and symbol of faith in the miraculous". When these claims were investigated and doctors were sent to help her, Eaton continued to refuse to eat and died after forty-five days.

In 1889, the Boston Globe ran a story, "Who Took the Cold Potato? Dr. Mary Walker Says the Fasting Girl Bit a Doughnut." Dr. Mary Edwards Walker reported that Josephine Marie Bedard, known as the Tingwick girl, was a fraud. The evidence was circumstantial: "At the hotel I searched her clothing and found in one of her pockets a doughnut with a bite taken out of it.... On Fast day I had a lunch served to me... I left a platter with three pieces of fried potato on it. I went there and one of the pieces was gone... when I returned, Josephine had her handkerchief to her mouth." Asked whether that was all the evidence, she said, "after I accused her of it she broke down and cried."

Because fasting girls were such a curiosity in the Victorian era, many companies and individuals rushed to put them on display, as in a then-popular freak show or human zoo. In the case of Josephine Marie Bedard, two different Boston-based enterprises, the Nickelodeon and Stone and Shaw's museum, competed in court for the right to "exhibit the girl" publicly. Still, even as she was used for blatant commercial gain, there was also an element of scientific inquiry in regarding Bedard as a medical phenomenon.

== Works ==
- Crome Yellow, 1921 novel
- The Wonder, 2022 film

== See also ==
- Anorexia mirabilis, Middle Ages
- Ann Moore (impostor)
- Inedia
- Scientific skepticism
