= Sterling Hospitals =

Indian Hospital

- Industry: Healthcare
- Founded: 2001 - Present
- Headquarters: Sterling Hospitals Road, Gurukul, Memnagar, Ahmedabad, Gujarat, 380052, India
- Key people: Mr. Santosh Marathe, MD & CEO
- Number of employees: More than 1800
- Website: sterlinghospitals.com

Sterling Hospitals was established in 2001 as a tertiary-care hospital. Sterling Addlife India Pvt. Ltd. owns and manages the hospital. Sterling provides medical and surgical care in its four multi-specialty hospitals in Gujarat, Ahmedabad (298 beds), Vadodara (192 beds), Rajkot (190 beds), and Gandhidham (135 beds)

In 2009, Sterling became the first hospital in Gujarat to be fully accredited by NABH. Its laboratories were also the first in Gujarat to be accredited by NABL.

In 2010, for the second consecutive year, Sterling Hospital had been named the "No. 1" hospital in Ahmedabad based on the latest THE WEEK – IMRB surveys.

In 2014, Sterling claimed that it was the first hospital chain in Gujarat to have a comprehensive diagnostics mobile application. Sterling Accuris Diagnosics is a sister concern of Sterling Group with 50+ labs across India.

In 2017, Sterling Cancer Hospitals was launched to provide dedicated healthcare services for cancer patients. Hospitals are located in Ahmedabad, Baroda and Gandhidham

Sterling Hospitals established a center for stroke patients in Ahmedabad in 2018.
