= List of A24 films =

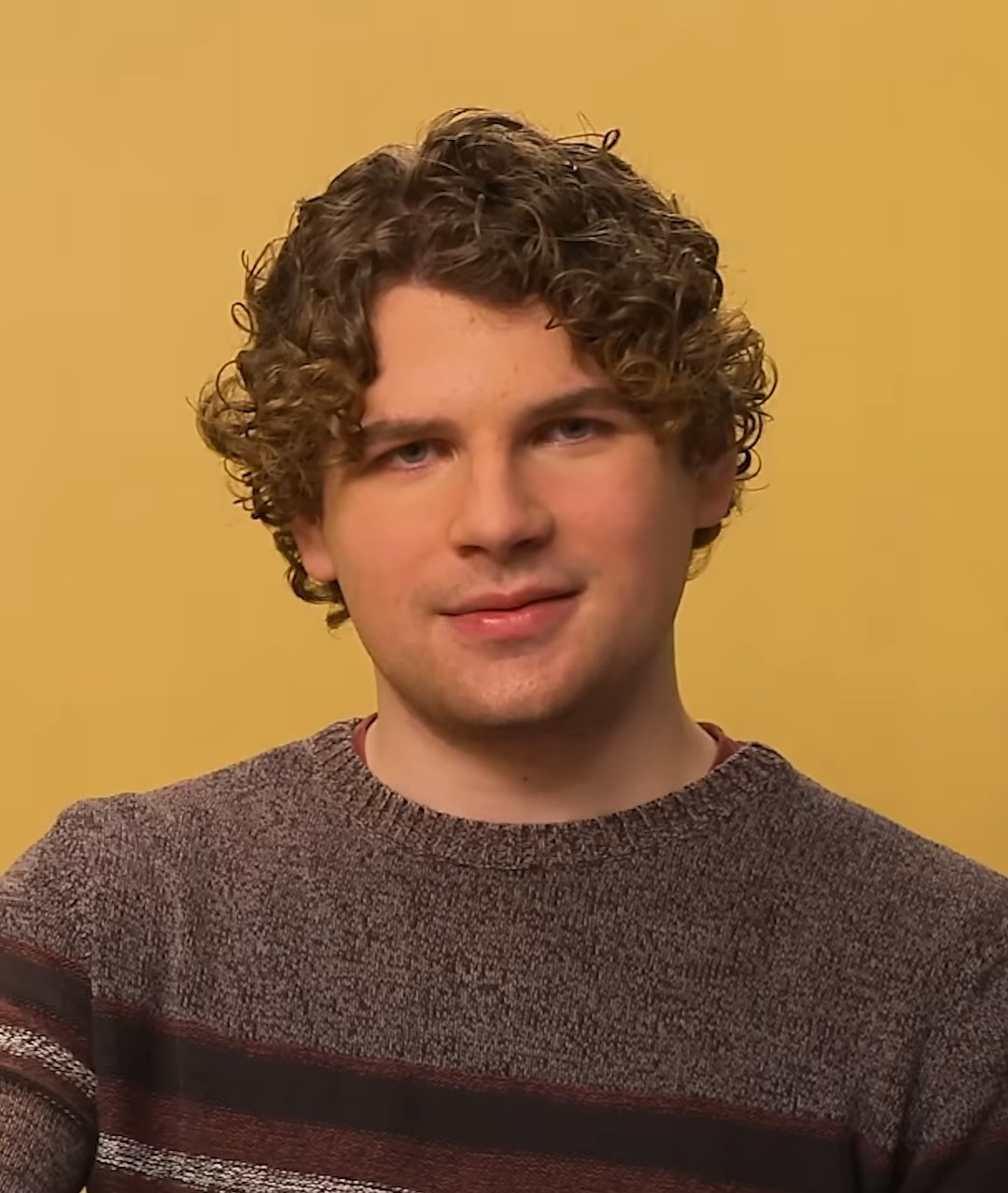
Backrooms (2026), directed by then 20-year-old Kane Parsons (pictured), is A24's highest-grossing film.

A24 is an American independent film production and distribution company based in New York City. It launched in August 2012, released its first film, A Glimpse Inside the Mind of Charles Swan III, in February 2013, and gained recognition with the box-office success of Spring Breakers that March. In late 2013, they made deals with Amazon Prime Video and DirecTV Cinema for video-on-demand releases.

In 2016, they amassed seven Academy Award nominations for movies they distributed; Amy (2015) won Best Documentary, Ex Machina (2014) won Best Visual Effects, and Brie Larson received Best Actress for Room (2015). A24 also became a production studio that year, financing Moonlight (2016) in partnership with Plan B Entertainment; that film earned critical acclaim and won three Academy Awards, including Best Picture. Since then, the company has produced more original content and partnered with Apple TV+ and Showtime Networks for digital releases.

Backrooms (2026) is A24's highest-grossing film worldwide with $401 million in box office earnings. As of 2026, On Becoming a Guinea Fowl (2024) is A24's highest-rated film on Rotten Tomatoes with a 100% approval rating, and Moonlight is its highest-scoring film on Metacritic with a 99 out of 100.

== Released films ==
=== 2010s ===
Release date (Note: The listed date refers to the film's limited or wide theatrical release in the United States by A24, not necessarily its first screening or when it premiered.)	Title	Director(s)	Notes	Ref.
February 8, 2013	A Glimpse Inside the Mind of Charles Swan III	Roman Coppola	U.S. co-distribution with FilmBuff only	
March 15, 2013	Spring Breakers	Harmony Korine	U.S. co-distribution with Annapurna Pictures only	
March 15, 2013	Ginger & Rosa	Sally Potter	North American distribution only	
June 14, 2013	The Bling Ring	Sofia Coppola	U.S. distribution only	
August 2, 2013	The Spectacular Now	James Ponsoldt	North American distribution only	
March 14, 2014	Enemy	Denis Villeneuve	U.S. distribution only	
April 4, 2014	Under the Skin	Jonathan Glazer	U.S. distribution only	
April 25, 2014	Locke	Steven Knight	U.S. distribution only	
June 6, 2014	Obvious Child	Gillian Robespierre	North American distribution only	
June 13, 2014	The Rover	David Michôd	U.S. distribution only	
August 15, 2014	Life After Beth	Jeff Baena	U.S. distribution only	
September 19, 2014	Tusk	Kevin Smith	U.S. distribution only	
October 24, 2014	Laggies	Lynn Shelton	North American distribution only	
October 24, 2014	Revenge of the Green Dragons	Andrew Lau and Andrew Loo	U.S. co-distribution with DirecTV only	
December 12, 2014	The Captive	Atom Egoyan	U.S. distribution only	
December 31, 2014	A Most Violent Year	J. C. Chandor	U.S. distribution only	
January 16, 2015	Son of a Gun	Julius Avery	U.S. distribution only	
March 27, 2015	While We're Young	Noah Baumbach	U.S. distribution only	
April 3, 2015	Cut Bank	Matt Shakman	U.S. co-distribution with DirecTV only	
April 10, 2015	Ex Machina	Alex Garland	U.S. distribution only	
May 15, 2015	Slow West	John Maclean	U.S. co-distribution with DirecTV only	
May 29, 2015	Barely Lethal	Kyle Newman	U.S. co-distribution with DirecTV only	
July 3, 2015	Amy	Asif Kapadia	U.S. distribution only	
July 31, 2015	The End of the Tour	James Ponsoldt	U.S. distribution only	
August 7, 2015	Dark Places	Gilles Paquet-Brenner	U.S. co-distribution with DirecTV only	
September 25, 2015	Mississippi Grind	Anna Boden and Ryan Fleck	U.S. co-distribution with DirecTV only	
October 16, 2015	Room	Lenny Abrahamson	U.S. distribution only	
January 22, 2016	Mojave	William Monahan	U.S. co-distribution with DirecTV only	
February 19, 2016	The Witch	Robert Eggers	U.S. co-distribution with DirecTV only	
March 11, 2016	Remember	Atom Egoyan	U.S. distribution only	
March 18, 2016	Krisha	Trey Edward Shults	U.S. distribution only	
April 15, 2016	Green Room	Jeremy Saulnier	U.S. distribution only	
April 15, 2016	The Adderall Diaries	Pamela Romanowsky	U.S. co-distribution with DirecTV only	
May 13, 2016	The Lobster	Yorgos Lanthimos	U.S. distribution only	
June 10, 2016	De Palma	Noah Baumbach and Jake Paltrow		
June 24, 2016	Swiss Army Man	Dan Kwan and Daniel Scheinert		
July 15, 2016	Equals	Drake Doremus	U.S. co-distribution with DirecTV only	
July 29, 2016	Into the Forest	Patricia Rozema	U.S. co-distribution with DirecTV only	
August 19, 2016	Morris from America	Chad Hartigan	U.S. co-distribution with DirecTV only	
August 26, 2016	The Sea of Trees	Gus Van Sant	U.S. distribution only	
September 30, 2016	American Honey	Andrea Arnold	U.S. distribution only	
October 21, 2016	Moonlight	Barry Jenkins	Also produced by A24	
October 26, 2016	Oasis: Supersonic	Mat Whitecross	U.S. distribution only	
November 11, 2016	The Monster	Bryan Bertino	U.S. co-distribution with DirecTV only	
December 28, 2016	20th Century Women	Mike Mills	U.S. distribution only	
January 20, 2017	Trespass Against Us	Adam Smith	U.S. co-distribution with DirecTV only	
March 31, 2017	The Blackcoat's Daughter	Oz Perkins	U.S. co-distribution with DirecTV only	
April 21, 2017	Free Fire	Ben Wheatley	U.S. distribution only	
May 5, 2017	The Lovers	Azazel Jacobs	Also produced by A24	
June 2, 2017	The Exception	David Leveaux	U.S. co-distribution with DirecTV only	
June 16, 2017	It Comes at Night	Trey Edward Shults	Also produced by A24	
July 7, 2017	A Ghost Story	David Lowery		
July 28, 2017	Menashe	Joshua Z Weinstein	U.S. and Chinese distribution only	
August 11, 2017	Good Time	Safdie brothers	North American, U.K. and Irish distribution only	
September 22, 2017	Woodshock	Kate and Laura Mulleavy	U.S. distribution only	
October 6, 2017	The Florida Project	Sean Baker	U.S. distribution only	
October 20, 2017	The Killing of a Sacred Deer	Yorgos Lanthimos	North American distribution only	
November 3, 2017	Lady Bird	Greta Gerwig		
December 1, 2017	The Disaster Artist	James Franco	North American distribution only	
December 15, 2017	The Ballad of Lefty Brown	Jared Moshe	U.S. co-distribution with DirecTV only	
March 2, 2018	The Vanishing of Sidney Hall	Shawn Christensen	U.S. co-distribution with DirecTV only	
March 30, 2018	The Last Movie Star	Adam Rifkin	North American co-distribution with DirecTV only	
April 6, 2018	Lean on Pete	Andrew Haigh	North American distribution only	
April 27, 2018	Backstabbing for Beginners	Per Fly	U.S. co-distribution with DirecTV only	
May 18, 2018	First Reformed	Paul Schrader	U.S. distribution only	
May 25, 2018	How to Talk to Girls at Parties	John Cameron Mitchell	U.S. distribution only	
June 8, 2018	Hereditary	Ari Aster	Also produced by A24	
June 29, 2018	Woman Walks Ahead	Susanna White	U.S. co-distribution with DirecTV only	
July 13, 2018	Eighth Grade	Bo Burnham	Also produced by A24	
July 27, 2018	Hot Summer Nights	Elijah Bynum	co-distribution with DirecTV only	
August 3, 2018	Never Goin' Back	Augustine Frizzell		
August 10, 2018	A Prayer Before Dawn	Jean-Stéphane Sauvaire	North American co-distribution with DirecTV only	
September 10, 2018	Slice	Austin Vesely		
September 14, 2018	The Children Act	Richard Eyre	U.S. co-distribution with DirecTV only	
October 19, 2018	Mid90s	Jonah Hill	Also produced by A24	
February 1, 2019	Outlaws	Stephen McCallum	North American co-distribution with DirecTV only	
March 1, 2019	The Hole in the Ground	Lee Cronin	North American co-distribution with DirecTV only	
March 1, 2019	Climax	Gaspar Noé	U.S. distribution only	
March 8, 2019	Gloria Bell	Sebastián Lelio	U.S. distribution only	
April 5, 2019	High Life	Claire Denis	North American distribution only	
April 6, 2019	Native Son	Rashid Johnson	Also produced by A24; distributed by HBO Films	
April 19, 2019	Under the Silver Lake	David Robert Mitchell	North American distribution only	
May 17, 2019	The Souvenir	Joanna Hogg	North American distribution only	
June 7, 2019	The Last Black Man in San Francisco	Joe Talbot		
July 3, 2019	Midsommar	Ari Aster		
July 12, 2019	The Farewell	Lulu Wang		
July 26, 2019	Skin	Guy Nattiv	North American co-distribution with DirecTV only	
July 27, 2019	Share	Pippa Bianco	Also produced by A24; distributed by HBO Films	
September 27, 2019	The Death of Dick Long	Daniel Scheinert	Also produced by A24	
October 4, 2019	Low Tide	Kevin McMullin	U.S. co-distribution with DirecTV only	
October 18, 2019	The Lighthouse	Robert Eggers	Also produced by A24	
October 18, 2019	The Elephant Queen	Victoria Stone and Mark Deeble	Co-distributed with Apple TV+	
October 25, 2019	The Kill Team	Dan Krauss	North American distribution only	
November 15, 2019	Waves	Trey Edward Shults	Also produced by A24	
December 6, 2019	In Fabric	Peter Strickland	North American distribution only	
December 13, 2019	Uncut Gems	Safdie brothers	Also produced by A24	

=== 2020s ===
Release date	Title	Director(s)	Notes	Ref.
March 6, 2020	First Cow	Kelly Reichardt		
August 14, 2020	Boys State	Jesse Moss and Amanda McBaine	Co-distributed with Apple TV+	
October 2, 2020	On the Rocks	Sofia Coppola	Co-distributed with Apple TV+	
January 29, 2021	Saint Maud	Rose Glass	North American distribution only	
February 12, 2021	Minari	Lee Isaac Chung	Also produced by A24	
June 25, 2021	False Positive	John Lee	Produced by A24; distributed by Hulu	
June 30, 2021	Zola	Janicza Bravo	Also produced by A24	
July 23, 2021	Val	Leo Scott and Ting Poo	Produced by A24; distributed by Amazon Studios	
July 30, 2021	The Green Knight	David Lowery	Also produced by A24	
October 8, 2021	Lamb	Valdimar Jóhannsson	North American distribution only	
October 29, 2021	The Souvenir Part II	Joanna Hogg	North American distribution only	
November 19, 2021	C'mon C'mon	Mike Mills	Also produced by A24	
November 24, 2021	The Humans	Stephen Karam	Also produced by A24; co-distributed with Showtime	
December 10, 2021	Red Rocket	Sean Baker	North American distribution only	
December 25, 2021	The Tragedy of Macbeth	Joel Coen	Also produced by A24; co-distributed with Apple TV+	
February 11, 2022	The Sky Is Everywhere	Josephine Decker	Co-distributed with Apple TV+	
March 4, 2022	After Yang	Kogonada	Also produced by A24; co-distributed with Showtime	
March 18, 2022	X	Ti West	Also produced by A24	
March 25, 2022	Everything Everywhere All at Once	Dan Kwan and Daniel Scheinert	Also produced by A24	
May 20, 2022	Men	Alex Garland	Also produced by A24	
May 27, 2022	Elizabeth: A Portrait in Parts	Roger Michell	Distributed by Showtime	
June 24, 2022	Marcel the Shell with Shoes On	Dean Fleischer Camp	North American distribution only	
August 5, 2022	Bodies Bodies Bodies	Halina Reijn	Also produced by A24	
August 26, 2022	Funny Pages	Owen Kline	Also produced by A24	
September 16, 2022	Pearl	Ti West	Also produced by A24	
September 22, 2022	Instinct	Halina Reijn		
September 30, 2022	God's Creatures	Saela Davis and Anna Rose Holmer	Also produced by A24	
October 14, 2022	Stars at Noon	Claire Denis	North American distribution only	
October 21, 2022	Aftersun	Charlotte Wells	North American distribution only	
October 28, 2022	Causeway	Lila Neugebauer	Produced by A24; co-distributed with Apple TV+	
November 18, 2022	The Inspection	Elegance Bratton	Also produced by A24	
November 25, 2022	White Noise	Noah Baumbach	Produced by A24; distributed by Netflix	
December 2, 2022	Close	Lukas Dhont	North American distribution only	
December 2, 2022	The Eternal Daughter	Joanna Hogg		
December 9, 2022	The Whale	Darren Aronofsky	Also produced by A24	
December 30, 2022	This Place Rules	Andrew Callaghan	Produced by A24; distributed by HBO	
January 20, 2023	When You Finish Saving the World	Jesse Eisenberg	Also produced by A24	
February 10, 2023	Sharper	Benjamin Caron	Also produced by A24; co-distributed with Apple TV+	
March 14, 2023	Pi	Darren Aronofsky	25th anniversary re-release (Note: originally distributed by Artisan Entertainment)	
April 7, 2023	Showing Up	Kelly Reichardt	Also produced by A24	
April 14, 2023	Beau Is Afraid	Ari Aster	Also produced by A24	
May 26, 2023	You Hurt My Feelings	Nicole Holofcener	U.S. distribution only	
June 2, 2023	Past Lives	Celine Song	Also produced by A24	
July 7, 2023	Earth Mama	Savanah Leaf	Also produced by A24	
July 19, 2023	The Deepest Breath	Laura McGann	Produced by A24; distributed by Netflix	
July 21, 2023	Stephen Curry: Underrated	Peter Nicks	Produced by A24; distributed by Apple TV+	
July 28, 2023	Talk to Me	Danny and Michael Philippou	North American distribution only	
August 11, 2023	Medusa Deluxe	Thomas Hardiman	North American distribution only	
September 22, 2023	Stop Making Sense	Jonathan Demme	Re-release (Note: originally distributed by Cinecom Pictures and Island Alive)	
October 6, 2023	Dicks: The Musical	Larry Charles	Also produced by A24	
October 27, 2023	Priscilla	Sofia Coppola	North American distribution only	
November 3, 2023	All Dirt Roads Taste of Salt	Raven Jackson	Also produced by A24	
November 10, 2023	Dream Scenario	Kristoffer Borgli	Also produced by A24	
December 15, 2023	The Zone of Interest	Jonathan Glazer	Also produced by A24	
December 22, 2023	The Iron Claw	Sean Durkin	Also produced by A24	
December 25, 2023	Occupied City	Steve McQueen	Also produced by A24	
January 1, 2024	Jerry Lee Lewis: Trouble in Mind	Ethan Coen	Produced by A24; distributed by Amazon Prime Video	
January 12, 2024	My Mercury	Joelle Chesselet and Philippa Ehrlich	Produced by A24; distributed by Amazon Prime Video	
January 23, 2024	Open Wide	Sara Goldblatt	Produced by A24; distributed by Netflix	
March 1, 2024	Problemista	Julio Torres	Also produced by A24	
March 8, 2024	Love Lies Bleeding	Rose Glass	Also produced by A24	
March 29, 2024	Steve! (Martin): A Documentary in 2 Pieces	Morgan Neville	Produced by A24; distributed by Apple TV+	
April 12, 2024	Civil War	Alex Garland	Also produced by A24	
May 3, 2024	I Saw the TV Glow	Jane Schoenbrun	Also produced by A24	
May 3, 2024	The Sixth	Andrea Nix Fine and Sean Fine	Produced by A24; video on demand release	
June 7, 2024	Tuesday	Daina O. Pusić	Also produced by A24	
June 21, 2024	Janet Planet	Annie Baker	Also produced by A24	
July 5, 2024	MaXXXine	Ti West	Also produced by A24	
July 12, 2024	Sing Sing	Greg Kwedar	U.S. distribution only	
September 6, 2024	The Front Room	The Eggers Brothers	Also produced by A24	
September 6, 2024	Look into My Eyes	Lana Wilson	Also produced by A24	
September 20, 2024	A Different Man	Aaron Schimberg	Also produced by A24	
October 11, 2024	The Last of the Sea Women	Sue Kim	Produced by A24; distributed by Apple TV+	
October 11, 2024	We Live in Time	John Crowley	North American distribution only	
November 8, 2024	Heretic	Scott Beck and Bryan Woods	Also produced by A24	
November 27, 2024	Queer	Luca Guadagnino	U.S. distribution only	
December 6, 2024	Y2K	Kyle Mooney	Also produced by A24	
December 20, 2024	The Brutalist	Brady Corbet	U.S. distribution only	
December 25, 2024	Babygirl	Halina Reijn	Also produced by A24	
February 7, 2025	Parthenope	Paolo Sorrentino	North American distribution only	
March 7, 2025	On Becoming a Guinea Fowl	Rungano Nyoni	Also produced by A24	
March 14, 2025	Opus	Mark Anthony Green	Also produced by A24	
March 28, 2025	Death of a Unicorn	Alex Scharfman	Also produced by A24	
April 11, 2025	Warfare	Ray Mendoza and Alex Garland	Also produced by A24	
April 18, 2025	The Legend of Ochi	Isaiah Saxon	Also produced by A24	
May 9, 2025	Friendship	Andrew DeYoung	North American distribution only	
May 30, 2025	Bring Her Back	Danny and Michael Philippou		
June 13, 2025	Materialists	Celine Song		
June 27, 2025	Sorry, Baby	Eva Victor		
July 18, 2025	Eddington	Ari Aster	Also produced by A24	
August 1, 2025	Architecton	Victor Kossakovsky	Also produced by A24	
August 15, 2025	Highest 2 Lowest	Spike Lee	Produced by A24; distributed by Apple TV+	
August 22, 2025	Ne Zha 2	Jiaozi	English dubbed version; co-distribution with CMC Pictures	
October 3, 2025	The Smashing Machine	Benny Safdie	Also produced by A24	
October 10, 2025	If I Had Legs I'd Kick You	Mary Bronstein	Also produced by A24	
November 26, 2025	Eternity	David Freyne	Also produced by A24	
December 25, 2025	Marty Supreme	Josh Safdie	Also produced by A24	
January 30, 2026	The Moment	Aidan Zamiri		
February 6, 2026	Pillion	Harry Lighton	U.S. distribution only	
February 20, 2026	How to Make a Killing	John Patton Ford		
March 6, 2026	André Is an Idiot	Tony Benna	Produced by A24; distributed by Joint Venture	
March 13, 2026	Undertone	Ian Tuason		
March 20, 2026	Marc by Sofia	Sofia Coppola	Also produced by A24	
April 3, 2026	The Drama	Kristoffer Borgli	Also produced by A24	
April 17, 2026	Mother Mary	David Lowery	Also produced by A24	
May 29, 2026	Backrooms	Kane Parsons	Also produced by A24	
June 19, 2026	The Death of Robin Hood	Michael Sarnoski	North American distribution only	
June 26, 2026	The Invite	Olivia Wilde	U.S. distribution only	
August 7, 2026	Tony	Matt Johnson		
September 4, 2026	Onslaught	Adam Wingard	Also produced by A24	
September 25, 2026	Primetime	Lance Oppenheim	Also produced by A24	
October 9, 2026	Misty Green	Chris Rock	Also produced by A24	
October 16, 2026	You Can See Everything	Nathan Fielder and Lance Oppenheim	Also produced by A24	
November 6, 2026	Club Kid	Jordan Firstman		
November 6, 2026	Nuisance Bear	Jack Weisman and Gabriela Osio Vanden	Produced by A24; distributed by Mubi	

== Upcoming ==
=== Scheduled films ===
Release date	Title	Director	Notes	Ref.
December 11, 2026	The Debut	Jesse Eisenberg		
January 29, 2027	Slayground	Jeremy Saulnier	Also produced by A24	
March 3, 2028	Elden Ring	Alex Garland	Also produced by A24	

=== Undated films ===
Year	Title	Director(s)	Notes	Ref.
2027	Altar	Egor Abramenko		
2027	The Chaperones	India Donaldson	Also produced by A24	
2027	Deep Cuts	Sean Durkin	Also produced by A24	
2027	Enemies	Henry Dunham		
2027	The Entertainment System Is Down	Ruben Östlund	U.S. distribution only	
2027	Famous	Jody Hill	U.S. distribution only	
2027	Flesh of the Gods	Panos Cosmatos	U.S. distribution only	
2027	Hillside Drive	Lenny Abrahamson	U.S. distribution only	
2027	The Land of Nod	Kyle Edward Ball	Also produced by A24	
2027	The Masque of the Red Death	Charlie Polinger		
2027	Peaked	Molly Gordon	Also produced by A24	
2027	The Peasant	Dev Patel		
2027	The Riders	Edward Berger	Also produced by A24	
2027	V/H/S: SCP	TBA		
2027	Wizards!	David Michôd	Also produced by A24	
2027	Untitled film	Arkasha Stevenson	Also produced by A24	
TBA	Ancient History	Annie Baker	Also produced by A24	
TBA	Goblin	David Mikalson	Also produced by A24	
TBA	Hotel Hotel Hotel Hotel	Michael Shanks	Also produced by A24	
TBA	No One Is Coming	Ronan Corrigan		
TBA	Please	Halina Reijn	Also produced by A24	
TBA	Schiller Park	Conner O'Malley	Also produced by A24	
TBA	Stages	Sonoya Mizuno	North American distribution only	

=== In development ===
Title	Ref.
Backrooms 2	
Barney	
Bloodsport	
Breakthrough	
Bushido	
Death Stranding	
Dennis	
The Guest	
The Heaven & Earth Grocery Store	
Jonty	
The Looming	
Mice	
Not Another F**king Wedding	
On Earth We're Briefly Gorgeous	
Scapegoat	
Talk 2 Me	
The Texas Chainsaw Massacre	
Three Times a Lady	
Untitled Alex Garland sci-fi film	
Why Don't You Love Me?	

== See also ==
- List of A24 programs
