= List of A24 programs =

This is a list of television programs distributed or produced by A24, a film distribution company based in New York City that was launched by Daniel Katz, David Fenkel, and John Hodges in August 2012.

In May 2015, A24 announced that it would start a television division. On March 26, 2018, Hodges announced that he was exiting the company.

The company began producing the USA Network series Playing House (2014–2017), as well as working to develop a television series that would later become Comrade Detective, which was co-produced by Channing Tatum and released on Prime Video, in August 2017. A24 also announced that they would finance and develop television pilots. In 2022, former HBO and Amazon Studios television executive Nick Hall joined A24 to oversee creative for the company's growing television slate.

Other notable programs include: At Home with Amy Sedaris (2017–2020), Beef (2023–present), The Carmichael Show (2015–2017), Euphoria (2019–2026), I'm Sorry (2017–2019), Irma Vep (2022), Mo (2022–2025), Mr. Corman (2021), Ramy (2019–2022), and Ziwe (2021–2022).

== Programs ==
Year	Title	Air date	Number of seasons	Number of episodes	Network
2014	Fireside Chat with Esther	January 1, 2014 – January 1, 2018	5	23	–
2014	Playing House	April 29, 2014 – July 14, 2017	3	26	USA
2015	The Carmichael Show	August 26, 2015 – August 9, 2017	3	32	NBC
2016	Reggie Watts: Spatial	December 6, 2016	–	1	Netflix
2017	Jerrod Carmichael: 8	March 11, 2017	–	1	HBO
2017	Comrade Detective	August 4, 2017	1	6	Amazon Prime Video
2018	2 Dope Queens	February 2, 2018 – March 1, 2019	2	8	HBO
2018	Random Acts of Flyness	August 4, 2018 – December 24, 2022	2	12	HBO
2018	Drew Michael	August 25, 2018	–	1	HBO
2018	Pod Save America	October 12, 2018	1	4	HBO
2019	I'm Sorry	January 9, 2019 – May 19, 2019	1 (Note: Signed on as producer beginning with the second season.)	10	TruTV
2019	At Home with Amy Sedaris	February 19, 2019 – July 29, 2020	2	20	TruTV
2019	Ramy	April 19, 2019 – September 30, 2022	3	30	Hulu
2019	Fire in the Maternity Ward	April 30, 2019	–	1	Netflix
2019	Euphoria	June 16, 2019 – May 31, 2026	3	26	HBO
2019	The Confession Tapes	June 21, 2019	1	4	Netflix
2019	Exhibit A	June 28, 2019	1	4	Netflix
2019	Ramy Youssef: Feelings	June 29, 2019	–	1	HBO
2019	Frankenstein's Monster's Monster, Frankenstein	July 16, 2019	–	1	Netflix
2019	My Favourite Shapes by Julio Torres	August 10, 2019	–	1	HBO
2019	John Mulaney & the Sack Lunch Bunch	December 24, 2019	–	1	Netflix
2020	Whitmer Thomas: The Golden One	February 22, 2020	–	1	HBO
2020	Eric Andre: Legalize Everything	June 23, 2020	–	1	Netflix
2020	Moonbase 8	November 8, 2020 – December 6, 2020	1	6	Showtime
2021	Ziwe	May 6, 2021 – December 25, 2022	2	18	Showtime
2021	Mr. Corman	August 6, 2021 – October 1, 2021	1	10	Apple TV+
2021	Tacoma FD	September 16, 2021 – October 5, 2023	2 (Note: Signed on as producer beginning with the third season.)	26	TruTV
2021	Phoebe Robinson: Sorry, Harriet Tubman	October 14, 2021	–	1	HBO Max
2021	Mo Amer: Mohammed in Texas	November 30, 2021	–	1	Netflix
2022	Ali Wong: Don Wong	February 14, 2022	–	1	Netflix
2022	The G Word with Adam Conover	May 19, 2022	1	6	Netflix
2022	Irma Vep	June 6, 2022 – July 25, 2022	1	8	HBO
2022	Home	June 17, 2022	1	10	Apple TV+
2022	Would It Kill You to Laugh? Starring Kate Berlant + John Early	June 24, 2022	–	1	Peacock
2022	Mo	August 24, 2022 – January 30, 2025	2	16	Netflix
2023	Beef	April 6, 2023 - present	2	18	Netflix
2023	The Gallows Pole	May 31, 2023 – June 14, 2023	1	3	BBC Two; BBC iPlayer
2023	The Idol	June 4, 2023 – July 2, 2023	1	5	HBO
2023	Survival of the Thickest	July 13, 2023 – 2026	2	16	Netflix
2023	Dreaming Whilst Black	July 24, 2023 – present	2	12	BBC Three; Showtime
2023	The Curse	November 12, 2023 – January 14, 2024	1	10	Showtime; Paramount+ with Showtime
2023	Such Brave Girls	November 22, 2023 – present	2	12	BBC Three
2023	Leo Reich: Literally Who Cares?!	December 16, 2023	–	1	HBO
2023	Icon of French Cinema	December 28, 2023	1	6	Arte
2024	Hazbin Hotel	January 19, 2024 – present	2	16	Amazon Prime Video
2024	Jenny Slate: Seasoned Professional	February 23, 2024	–	1	Amazon Prime Video
2024	Ramy Youssef: More Feelings	March 23, 2024	–	1	HBO
2024	The Sympathizer	April 14, 2024 – May 26, 2024	1	7	HBO
2024	Sunny	July 10, 2024 – September 4, 2024	1	10	Apple TV+
2025	#1 Happy Family USA	April 17, 2025 – present	1	8	Amazon Prime Video
2025	Overcompensating	May 15, 2025 – present	1	8	Amazon Prime Video
2025	Shifty	June 14, 2025	1	5	BBC iPlayer
2025	The Yogurt Shop Murders	August 3, 2025 – August 24, 2025	1	4	HBO
2026	Neighbors	February 13, 2026 – present	1	6	HBO
2026	Born to Bowl	March 16, 2026 – April 13, 2026	1	5	HBO
2026	Margo's Got Money Troubles	April 15, 2026 – present	1	8	Apple TV
2026	Monsters of God	August 6, 2026 – September 3, 2026	1	5	HBO
2026	Crystal Lake	October 15, 2026 – present	1	8	Peacock
2026	It Gets Worse	October 22, 2026 – present	1	6	Channel 4 (United Kingdom); Crave (Canada)
2026	Oobah: Scams for a Better Tomorrow	November 22, 2026	1	5	HBO
2027	The Spot	January 13, 2027	1	8	Hulu
2027	Discretion	2027	1	8	Paramount+
2027	Superfakes	2027	N/A	N/A	Peacock
TBA	The Ministry of Time	N/A	N/A	N/A	BBC
TBA	First Day on Earth	N/A	1	10	BBC One (United Kingdom); HBO (United States)
TBA	The Husbands	N/A	1	8	Apple TV
TBA	Major Players	N/A	N/A	N/A	Channel 4 (United Kingdom); ZDF (Germany)
TBA	Trigger Point	N/A	N/A	N/A	Netflix
TBA	The Marriage Plot	N/A	N/A	N/A	FX; FX on Hulu

=== In development ===
Title	Air date	Number of seasons	Number of episodes	Network
Angel Heart	N/A	N/A	N/A	HBO
Boyfriend Material	N/A	N/A	N/A	N/A
Fairy Tale	N/A	N/A	N/A	N/A
Forever, Interrupted	N/A	N/A	N/A	Netflix
Girl Abroad	N/A	N/A	N/A	N/A
The Girlfriends	N/A	N/A	N/A	N/A
Hope	N/A	N/A	N/A	Netflix
Lifties	N/A	N/A	N/A	HBO
London Falling	N/A	N/A	N/A	N/A
Magnolia Parks	N/A	N/A	N/A	N/A
Next Door	N/A	N/A	N/A	Netflix
Overcooked	N/A	N/A	N/A	Netflix
Paris: The Memoir	N/A	N/A	N/A	N/A
Shuggie Bain	N/A	N/A	N/A	BBC One; BBC iPlayer
A Visit from the Goon Squad	N/A	N/A	N/A	N/A
We Are the Dead	N/A	N/A	N/A	N/A
Weather Girl	N/A	N/A	N/A	Netflix
White Smoke	N/A	N/A	N/A	N/A
Untitled Bill Shankly series	N/A	N/A	N/A	N/A
Untitled Dylan Brady series	N/A	N/A	N/A	N/A
Untitled Halley Feiffer series	N/A	N/A	N/A	Netflix
Untitled Texas Chainsaw Massacre series	N/A	N/A	N/A	N/A
Untitled Zooey Deschanel series	N/A	N/A	N/A	N/A
