= A24 =

American independent entertainment company

A24 Films LLC
- Trade name: A24
- Formerly: A24 Films (2012–2016)
- Type: Private
- Industry: Entertainment
- Founded: August 20, 2012; 14 years ago
- Founders: Daniel Katz; David Fenkel; John Hodges
- Headquarters: 1245 Broadway, Manhattan, New York City, United States
- Number of locations: 2 (2016)
- Area served: Worldwide
- Key people: Daniel Katz; David Fenkel; Ravi Nandan; JB Lockhart; Scott Belsky
- Products: Motion pictures; Television programs
- Services: Film distribution/production Home entertainment; Television production
- Number of employees: 295 (2021)
- Divisions: A24 Music; A24 Television; A24 International; A24 All Access (AAA24); A24 Labs
- Subsidiaries: Cherry Lane Theatre (co-owner); A24/Leonine Studios (50%)
- Website: a24films.com

A24 Films LLC, commonly referred to as A24, is an American independent entertainment company specializing in film and television production, as well as film distribution. They distribute and produce arthouse films. Some of their most notable films include Ex Machina (2014), The Witch (2015), Moonlight (2016), Lady Bird (2017), Hereditary (2018), Uncut Gems (2019), Everything Everywhere All at Once (2022), The Whale (2022), The Brutalist (2024), Civil War (2024), Marty Supreme (2025), Backrooms (2026), Primetime (2026), You Can See Everything (2026), and Club Kid (2026). They also produced the X film series.

The New York-based company was founded in 2012 by Daniel Katz, David Fenkel, and John Hodges. All had worked in film and production before, leaving their positions to co-found the company, which specialized in film distribution. Starting with Roman Coppola's A Glimpse Inside the Mind of Charles Swan III in 2012, the company's growth began with the release of Harmony Korine's Spring Breakers later that year. A24 picked up the American rights to Ex Machina in 2014 and Room in 2015, before obtaining worldwide rights to Robert Eggers' The Witch, which was released theatrically in 2015. In late 2013, they entered into deals with Amazon Prime Video and DirecTV Cinema. The name was changed to just A24 in 2016. That same year, A24's Moonlight premiered and later won three Oscars from eight nominations, including the Academy Award for Best Picture. In 2022, A24 produced the film Everything Everywhere All at Once, which won the Academy Award for Best Picture and six more Oscars; the film also received acclaim from both audiences and critics. It was their first film to reach $100 million at the box office. Four years later, in 2026, Kane Parsons' Backrooms became A24's first film to pass $200 million at the box office.

A24's television division, launched in 2015, has produced programs that include At Home with Amy Sedaris (2017–2020), Beef (2023–present), The Carmichael Show (2015–2017), Euphoria (2019–2026), Hazbin Hotel (2024–present), I'm Sorry (2017–2019), Irma Vep (2022), Mo (2022–2025), Mr. Corman (2021), Ramy (2019–2022), and Ziwe (2021–2022).

The company has also worked with writer-directors, including Ari Aster, Robert Eggers, Darren Aronofsky, Sean Baker, the Daniels, Danny and Michael Philippou, Alex Garland, Scott Beck and Bryan Woods, Rose Glass, Celine Song, Joanna Hogg, Yorgos Lanthimos, Sean Durkin, Kristoffer Borgli, David Lowery, Halina Reijn, Mike Mills, and the Safdie brothers.

The A24 fanbase is notable for its passionate nature and has been described as an independent film "cult". A24's projects have also had a major influence on style in contemporary horror and arthouse films, among other areas. A24 is also known for the originality and artistic style of films it produces, generally shunning the style of movies produced or released by the major film studios as well as generally avoiding their frequent sequel releases. As of 2023, in its latest films, it followed more commercial proposals.

== History ==
=== 2012–2013: Founding and early years ===
On August 17, 2012, Daniel Katz, David Fenkel, and John Hodges founded A24. Fenkel was the president and partner at Oscilloscope Laboratories, and Hodges was head of production and development at Big Beach Films. The name "A24" was inspired by the Autostrada A24 on which Katz was driving when he decided to found the company.

Guggenheim Partners provided the seed money for A24. The company was started with the mission to share "movies with a distinctive point of view". In October 2012, Nicolette Aizenberg joined as head of publicity from 42West, where she had been a senior publicity executive.

In 2012, A24 contacted GrandArmy, a creative design agency based in New York, to design their logo. They had tasked the agency with creating a branding and logo that was modern but also echoed the golden age of Hollywood. GrandArmy made the logo and motion graphic intro for A24 alongside its website, and their deco-influenced look was featured internally and externally.

=== 2013: Distribution ===
The company began its distribution of films in 2013. The company's first theatrical release was Roman Coppola's A Glimpse Inside the Mind of Charles Swan III, which had a limited theatrical release. Other 2013 theatrical releases included Sofia Coppola's The Bling Ring, Harmony Korine's Spring Breakers, James Ponsoldt's The Spectacular Now, and Sally Potter's Ginger & Rosa.

=== 2014–2017: Television and later productions ===
In its first five years, A24 Television focused mostly on stand-up specials and comedies and was run by longtime A24 partner Ravi Nandan. It began producing the USA Network series Playing House, as well as working to develop a television series that would later become Comrade Detective, produced by Channing Tatum. The company also announced that they would finance and develop pilots. A24 also helped make The Carmichael Show for NBC in 2015.

The company, with cooperation from Bank of America, J.P. Morgan & Co., and SunTrust Banks, raised its line of credit from $50 million to $125 million in 2016 to build upon its operations. In April, the company acquired all foreign distribution rights to Swiss Army Man (2016). In June, the company, along with Oscilloscope and distributor Honora, joined BitTorrent Now to distribute the work of their portfolio across the ad-supported service.

In January 2017, the company acquired the United States and Chinese distribution rights for their first foreign language film, Menashe.

=== 2018–2019: Popularity, management changes, and partnerships ===
On February 28, 2018, A24 launched a podcast titled "The A24 Podcast". Episodes are based around a discussion between two members of the film industry. Guests on the podcast have included Bo Burnham, Sofia Coppola, Paul Schrader, Martin Scorsese, and Alia Shawkat. Despite lacking a pre-defined structure, episodes generally contain discussions around recent works of the two guests, allowing for branching discussions to other areas. The first two guests were Barry Jenkins (director of A24's Moonlight) and Greta Gerwig (director of A24's Lady Bird), who both discussed what it was like to make a movie about the place they grew up. As of May 2024, there were 41 episodes available.

On March 26, 2018, co-founder John Hodges announced that he was exiting the company. On November 15, 2018, A24 and Apple announced a multi-year partnership, where A24 would produce a slate of original films for Apple. This was not a first-look deal, meaning A24 could continue to produce and acquire films to release outside of the deal, and that it would not affect previous deals that A24 had signed with other companies. They would later release Sofia Coppola's On the Rocks (2020) and Joel Coen's The Tragedy of Macbeth (2021), both of which received limited theatrical releases by A24 and then became available to stream on Apple TV+.

On November 13, 2019, A24 entered into deal with Showtime Networks, covering all film releases through November 1, 2022. The deal excludes films that are already part of the Apple partnership.

=== 2020–present: Academy Award wins, further agreements, and expansion ===
In July 2021, A24 explored a possible buyout from multiple suitors for between $2.5 billion and $3 billion. Also in 2021, Lee Isaac Chung's Minari (2020) earned a record of six Oscar nominations, and Valdimar Jóhannsson's Lamb (2021) was selected as a country's entry for the Academy Award for Best International Feature Film.

In October 2021, former NBA Chief Financial Officer (CFO) J.B. Lockhart joined A24 as CFO.

In January 2022, former HBO and Amazon MGM Studios TV executive Nick Hall joined A24 to oversee creative for the company's growing television slate. In April 2022, the company launched its subscription based membership program: AAA24. Membership benefits include free movie tickets, early access to merch drops, exclusive merch only available to members, discounts on merch, monthly store credit, a quarterly zine, a free birthday gift, and other perks such as giveaways and movie screenings.

In March 2023, A24 became the first independent studio to win Best Picture, Best Director, and all four acting categories in a single year at the 95th Academy Awards for Everything, Everywhere, All at Once and The Whale. A24's Close, Aftersun, Causeway, and Marcel the Shell With Shoes On all received nominations that year. That same month, the company bought distribution rights to two older films released before the company's inception, starting with Darren Aronofsky's Pi (1998) and Jonathan Demme's Stop Making Sense (1984), both of which are remastered versions.

In May 2023, German independent film distributor Leonine Studios partnered with A24 to set up a joint label, called "A24 | Leonine Studios", to distribute films in Austria and Germany. The next month, it was reported that former Disney General Entertainment Chairman Peter Rice signed a deal with A24 as an independent producer, agreeing to co-finance films for global distribution.

During the 2023 Hollywood labor disputes, which took place from May 2 to November 9, A24 was approved to continue filming and doing promotional activities since it does not have ties to the Alliance of Motion Picture and Television Producers (AMPTP).

In October 2023, TheWrap's Umberto Gonzalez exclusively reported that A24 was planning to expand its "strategy from arthouse films to more commercial films", including "action and big IP projects". According to one production executive from the company, A24 "took a beating on dramas, especially the ones they made". He added, "The auteur business is a lousy, high-risk business that does not attract potential buyers ... That's a big problem if you're looking to sell or seek additional investment". This decision was met with mixed responses from some journalists. That same month, A24 forged an exclusive output deal with Happinet Phantom Studios for the distribution of A24's upcoming releases in Japan, marking A24's first major international theatrical output deal. The companies would also build A24 brand awareness across the region, and deepen relationships with local talent and audiences off screen beyond film releases.

In 2023, A24 co-produced The Zone of Interest, a UK-financed film directed by Jonathan Glazer. The film premiered at the Cannes Film Festival to critical acclaim and was released in the US in December 2023.

In association with Prime Video and Fox Entertainment's Bento Box Entertainment, A24 launched its first animated project: the adult musical comedy series, Hazbin Hotel. The eight-episode first season premiered on January 19, 2024, on Prime Video; it received a two-season order. Later that same month, it was announced A24 struck a deal with United Talent Agency (UTA) to produce scripted and unscripted television via the latter's Civic Center Media banner.

In June 2024, A24 raised $75 million from Thrive Capital which valued the company at $3.5B.

In January 2025, Scott Belsky joined A24's leadership team as a partner, overseeing the studio's technology and innovation initiatives. In May 2025, A24 shuttered their documentary division, resulting in five layoffs. On November 12, 2025, D'Souza Gelb announced that management and production company 2AM was ending, and its three founders were parting ways. 2AM had launched in strategic partnership with A24, working together to produce Celine Song's Past Lives (2023) and Materialists (2025), Halina Reijn's Bodies Bodies Bodies (2022) and Babygirl (2024), among others.

In January 2026, it was announced that A24 and HBO Max had agreed to a multi-year renewal of their Pay-1 window deal. The renewal occurred in time for HBO subscribers access to stream Marty Supreme, followed by The Drama and other titles.

In April 2026, video game publisher Bandai Namco Entertainment and A24 announced that an adaptation of the fantasy video game Elden Ring would be coming in 2028. The film would be written and directed by Alex Garland (Civil War and Ex Machina) and be shot for IMAX. Kit Connor, Ben Whishaw, Cailee Spaeny, Nick Offerman, Tom Burke, and Havana Rose Liu were reported to be in the cast. That same month, it was also announced that Obsession (2025) filmmaker Curry Barker would write and direct a reimagining of The Texas Chainsaw Massacre (1974). Also in April, filmmaker Kane Parsons, A24's youngest feature director, took to CCXP Mexico to tease his horror movie, Backrooms. The film is an adaptation of the YouTube series Parsons began uploading in 2022 and would hit theaters in May 2026. In late April, it was announced that A24 UK had optioned rights for Alexis Hall’s BookTok hit Boyfriend Material along with Nick Brucker’s upcoming novel White Smoke, with plans to adapt both into TV series. A24 will produce the White Smoke adaption alongside Benedict Cumberbatch, who is also attached to star. On April 24, it was announced that A24 and Charli XCX’s The Moment was officially landing on HBO Max on May 29. This film was directed by Scottish filmmaker Aidan Zamiri and includes Alexander Skarsgård, Kylie Jenner, and Rachel Sennott in the cast. Late that month, it was announced that A24 and Plan B would produce director Molly Manning Walker's next film, Not Another F**king Wedding.

In May 2026, the first trailer for Matt Johnson's Anthony Bourdain biopic, Tony (2026), was released. Dominic Sessa plays the titular chef, while other cast members include Emilia Jones, Leo Woodall, Antonio Banderas, Dagmara Dominczyk, Rich Sommers, and Stavros Halkias. Also that month, A24 won a "highly competitive bidding war" for the global rights to Jordan Firstman's directorial debut, Club Kid (2026), which premiered at the Cannes Film Festival.

In June 2026, following the success of Backrooms, Google announced an investment of approximately $75 million in A24 to further develop artificial intelligence (AI) tools for filmmaking. Notably, the deal does not grant Google access to A24's content library. Under the deal, A24 will work with Google's DeepMind laboratory to develop new AI-powered workflows. This deal was met with extensive criticism and disappointment from many fans of the studio's previous work.

On September 24, 2026, A24 entered Sony's bidding war for social movie review website Letterboxd, along with The New York Times, as the site considered a new name and new ownership.

On November 9, 2026, NSS Magazine reported that rumors of a possible acquisition of A24 had surged in intensity, following the company's successful releases of Backrooms, You Can See Everything (one of the highest-grossing documentaries ever recorded), and The Drama. Depending on the buyer, the potential sale of A24 could drastically alter or preserve the perceptions of audiences and fans.

== Social media promotion ==
When A24 launched in 2012, they focused on the idea of saving money through lower-cost digital marketing and social media, as opposed to more traditional forms of media advertising from TV, radio, and billboards. The rise of images and memes across social media served as a means to promote their films' art direction and cinematography, and are often cited as pioneers in this space, which birthed their unique branding, and later several indie studios trying to emulate their marketing tactics.

In a 2013 interview, creative director Zoe Beyer discussed her approach to A24's social media:

For most of the content, I think of what will be relevant to people who like A24 movies. Fans of Harmony Korine or Sofia Coppola or Jonathan Glazer aren't going to be offended if we use the word shit or poke fun at Hollywood or take a stab at Jaden Smith's Twitter activity. Very occasionally, I will tweet something with no regard for whether it's relevant to anyone besides myself. This is probably bad practice, but I think the film industry in particular can be so opaque, it is nice to know there are actual human personalities behind these companies. That's why, sometimes, I will tweet about exotic pets or the NBA. The idea is just to keep it authentic.

== Film library ==
A24 produces and distributes about 18 to 20 films annually. It has also served as producer or distributor for several dozen television shows, including At Home with Amy Sedaris (2017–2020), Beef (2023–present), The Carmichael Show (2015–2017), Euphoria (2019–2026), Hazbin Hotel (2024–present), I'm Sorry (2017–2019), Irma Vep (2022), Mo (2022–2025), Mr. Corman (2021), Ramy (2019–2022), and Ziwe (2021–2022).

The action thriller Civil War (2024), written and directed by Alex Garland, was A24's most expensive in-house production, with a budget of $50 million. The film is described as "an adrenaline-fueled thrill ride through a near-future fractured America balanced on the razor's edge"; Kirsten Dunst stars in the lead role as a reporter. Civil War was released in the US on April 12, 2024, having been moved up from a release date of April 26, 2024.

Sports drama-comedy Marty Supreme (2025), co-written and directed by Josh Safdie, became the next most expensive film to make, costing $70 million. The film was a period movie following an ambitious, fast-talking table tennis player (played by Timothée Chalamet) and involved re-creating 1952 New York and dressing main actors and "an army of extras" in period-accurate clothing.

In 2025, A24 acquired US distribution rights for the Chinese language film Ne Zha 2. With a production budget of $80 million, it became the most expensive film A24 has distributed.

=== Highest-grossing films ===
Everything Everywhere All at Once (2022) was A24's first film to cross the $100-million mark worldwide. In April 2026, The Drama became the fifth A24 film to surpass $100 million at the global box office.

Kane Parsons' Backrooms, released in May 2026, became A24's biggest opening of all time at $81.4 million domestic and its first to open at over $100 million worldwide, with $118 million. It is also A24's first film to cross the $200-million mark worldwide. It became A24's highest-grossing worldwide release of all time, generating over $402 million globally.

Highest-grossing films in North America
Rank	Title	Year	Domestic gross
1	Backrooms	2026	$197,523,511
2	Marty Supreme	2025	$96,034,978
3	You Can See Everything	2026	$89,009,558
4	Everything Everywhere All at Once	2022	$77,191,785
5	Civil War	2024	$68,756,072
6	Uncut Gems	2019	$50,023,780
7	Lady Bird	2017	$48,958,273
8	Talk to Me	2022	$48,299,436
9	The Drama	2026	$48,062,006
10	Primetime	2026	$47,040,118

Highest-grossing A24 films worldwide
Rank	Title	Year	Box office gross
1	Backrooms	2026	$402,488,436
2	Marty Supreme	2025	$192,406,422
3	Everything Everywhere All at Once	2022	$147,946,670
4	The Drama	2026	$134,670,180
5	Civil War	2024	$127,268,065
6	Materialists	2025	$105,649,413
7	You Can See Everything	2026	$94,005,105
8	Talk to Me	2022	$92,203,980
9	Hereditary	2018	$90,431,327
10	Lady Bird	2017	$79,389,383

== Key styles and themes ==
A24 films are known for their unique storytelling, striking cinematography, and commitment to auteur art direction over mainstream filmmaking. They largely explore complex human emotions, existential themes, and genre-bending narratives in ways that are thought-provoking and often unpredictable.

Their cinematic style differs from film to film but primarily alters between — and sometimes combining — verisimilitude, viscerality, surrealism, alternate reality, deep character explorations and emotional journeys, and ambiguity.

=== Horror ===
A24 is well known for championing and producing artistic, psychologically disturbing, and mind-bending horror films popularly referred to as "elevated horror". These include Under the Skin (2013), The Witch (2015), It Comes at Night (2017),The Killing of a Sacred Deer (2017), Hereditary (2018), Midsommar (2019), The Lighthouse (2019), Talk to Me (2022), Men (2022), Heretic (2024), I Saw the TV Glow (2024), and Backrooms (2026). The term also refers to genre films with a seemingly more artful sensibility than most fare, plus a focus on dramatic themes such as grief and trauma.

=== War ===
A24 produced two notable war films, both directed by Alex Garland. Civil War (2024) is a dystopian alternate reality story of modern-day America engaged in civil war. Warfare (2025), co-directed by Garland and former US Navy Seal Ray Mendoza, recounts a 2006 battle that took place between US Navy Seals and Iraqi insurgents. Other war films include The Kill Team (2019), Causeway (2022) and The Zone of Interest (2023).

=== LGBTQ+ ===
Starting with Moonlight (2016), A24 has produced several films about queer characters and their experiences, although they often still incorporate other genres, like dark-comedy, fantasy, and horror. These films include The Whale (2022), Problemista (2023), Queer (2024), Love Lies Bleeding (2024), and I Saw the TV Glow (2024). Other LGBTQ-inclusive films from A24 are Parthenope (2024), Sorry, Baby (2025), Pillion (2025), Mother Mary (2026), and Club Kid.

According to GLAAD, an American non-governmental media monitoring organization, A24 had the best queer representation onscreen in 2024. Per GLAAD's study, A24 was the only distribution and production company to receive a “Good” grade in the 2025 edition of the annual GLAAD Studio Responsibility Index (SRI) report.

== Accolades ==
As of the 98th Academy Awards, A24 has received a total of 98 Academy Award nominations, winning 21 overall.

- In 2016, A24 won Best Actress (Brie Larson for Room), Best Documentary Feature Film (Amy), and Best Visual Effects (Ex Machina).
- In 2017, Moonlight won the Academy Award for Best Picture (the first such accolade for the studio), Best Adapted Screenplay (Barry Jenkins and Tarell Alvin McCraney), and Best Supporting Actor (Mahershala Ali).
- In 2021, A24 won the Academy Award for Best Supporting Actress (Yuh-jung Youn for Minari); Youn became the first Korean actress to win an Oscar for acting.
- In 2023, A24 experienced its most successful Oscar season when it became the most nominated single studio of that year's ceremony with 18 total nominations between six of their films: Everything Everywhere All at Once (11 nominations; the most nominated film that year, including Best Picture), The Whale (3 nominations), and Aftersun, Causeway, Close and Marcel the Shell with Shoes On (each with 1 nomination). A24 would ultimately become the most awarded studio that year with nine awards in total, as well as sweeping seven of the major awards. Everything Everywhere All at Once won seven: Best Picture, Best Director (Daniel Kwan and Daniel Scheinert), Best Actress (Michelle Yeoh), Best Supporting Actor (Ke Huy Quan), Best Supporting Actress (Jamie Lee Curtis), Best Original Screenplay (Daniel Kwan and Daniel Scheinert), and Best Film Editing (Paul Rogers). The Whale won two: Best Actor (Brendan Fraser) and Best Makeup and Hairstyling (Adrien Morot, Judy Chin, and Annemarie Bradley).
- In 2024, A24 had two films nominated for Best Picture for the first time: Past Lives and The Zone of Interest. The latter won the Academy Award for Best International Feature Film (representing United Kingdom) and Best Sound.
- In 2025, the A24 film The Brutalist was nominated for ten Oscars, winning Best Actor (Adrien Brody), Best Original Score (Daniel Blumberg), and Best Cinematography (Lol Crawley).
- In 2026, A24 had three films nominated. Marty Supreme was nominated for nine Oscars: Best Picture, Best Director (Josh Safdie), Best Actor (Timothée Chalamet), Best Original Screenplay (Ronald Bronstein and Josh Safdie), Best Casting (Jennifer Venditti), Best Cinematography (Darius Khondji), Best Costume Design (Miyako Bellizzi), Best Film Editing (Ronald Bronstein and Josh Safdie) and Best Production Design (Jack Fisk and Adam Willis). If I Had Legs I'd Kick You was nominated for Best Actress (Rose Byrne), and The Smashing Machine was nominated for Best Makeup and Hairstyling (Kazu Hiro, Glen Griffin and Bjoern Rehbein).

Additionally, A24 has been nominated and won numerous British Academy Film Awards, Critics' Choice Awards, Golden Globe Awards, Independent Spirit Awards, and Screen Actors Guild Awards.

The A24 film I Saw the TV Glow was nominated for the Hugo Award for Science Fiction in the Best Dramatic Presentation, Long Form category.

== Reception and legacy ==
IndieWire reported that an unnamed "high-level" Hollywood executive said that "A24 is a business whose aspirations are unlimited. They're not trying to become Focus [Features]. They want to become a big media company."

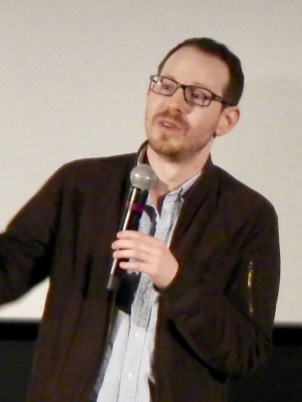
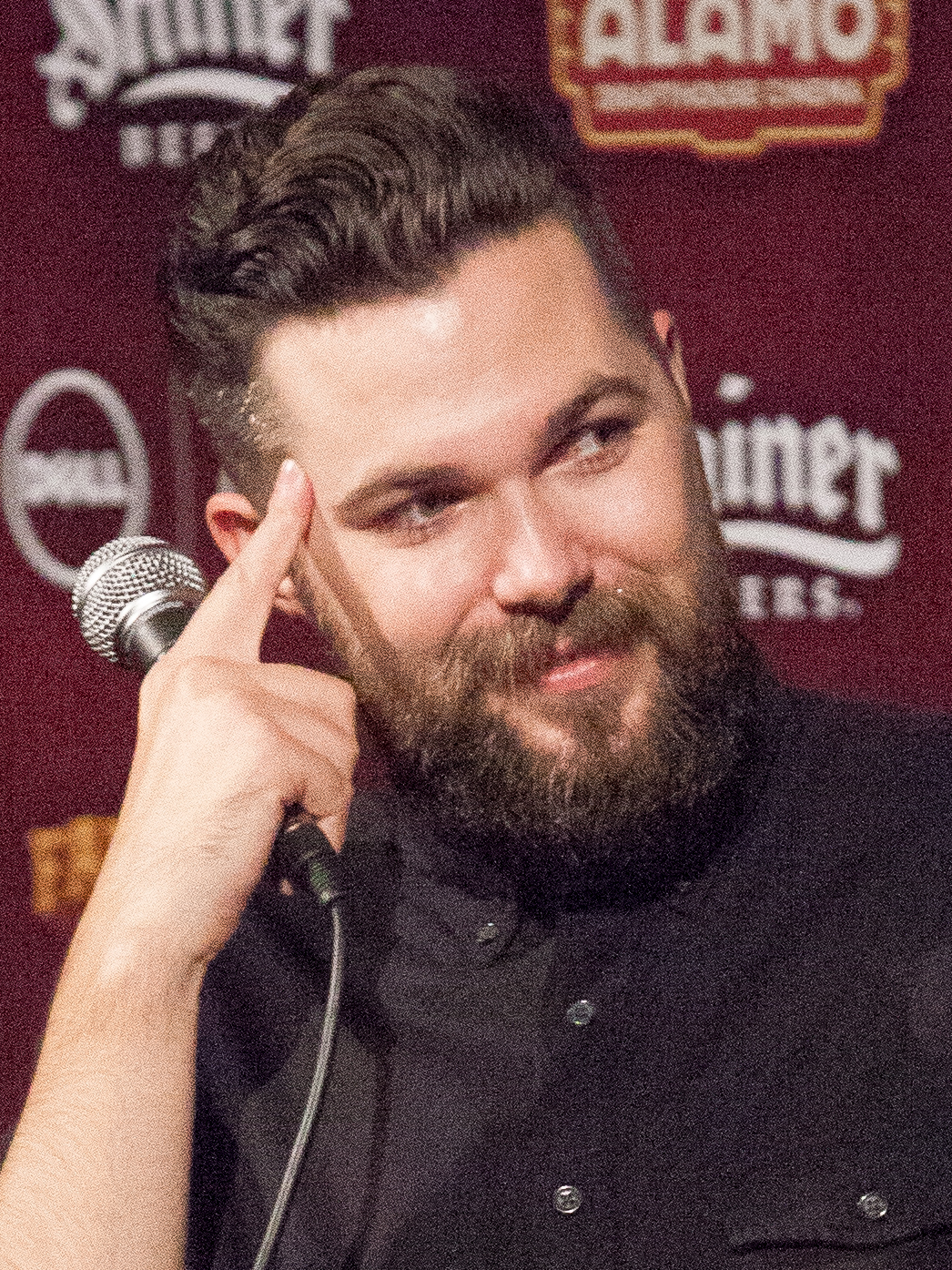
Ari Aster (left) and Robert Eggers (right)

Filmmaker David Lowery (director of A24's A Ghost Story and The Green Knight) praised A24, saying: "The great thing about A24 is that they're always up for a challenge. They remain undaunted; they'll take the most difficult, unsaleable aspect of your movie and turn it into its greatest asset." Fellow filmmaker James Ponsoldt (director of A24's The End of the Tour and The Spectacular Now) also applauded the company, saying: "A24 is remarkable at championing specific cinematic voices because they genuinely adore their films—and that enthusiasm is reflected in the creativity and laser-like precision of their marketing and releases."

Many of the performances in A24 films have received widespread critical acclaim, with many critics and reviewers describing these actor/actress' performances as some of the best of their career. Such performances include: Mahershala Ali's in Moonlight (2016), Awkwafina's in The Farewell (2019), Toni Collette's in Hereditary (2018), Brendan Fraser's in The Whale (2022), Mia Goth's in X (2022) and Pearl (2022), Tom Hardy's in Locke (2013), Brie Larson's in Room (2015), Greta Lee's in Past Lives (2023), Robert Pattinson's in Good Time (2017) and The Lighthouse (2019), Joaquin Phoenix's in C'mon C'mon (2021) and Beau Is Afraid (2023), Florence Pugh's in Midsommar (2019), Saoirse Ronan's in Lady Bird (2017), Adam Sandler's in Uncut Gems (2019), Anya Taylor-Joy's in The Witch (2015), Alicia Vikander's in Ex Machina (2014), as well as Ke Huy Quan, Michelle Yeoh, and Stephanie Hsu's in Everything Everywhere All at Once (2022).

A24 has frequently worked with many artistically minded writer-directors, for most of which the films released by the company pivoted their careers, including Ari Aster, Sean Baker, the Daniels, Robert Eggers, Alex Garland, Rose Glass, Joanna Hogg, Yorgos Lanthimos, David Lowery, and the Safdie brothers.

== Publications ==
As of April 2026, an A24 Screenplay Collection on Amazon featured 15 of A24's most popular films. At that time, Darren Aronofsky's The Whale (written by Samuel D. Hunter) and Sofia Coppola's Priscilla were the newest screenplays to be added to the collection.

== A24 auctions ==
Starting in 2020, A24 has set up auctions as way for fans to bid on props, wardrobe items, and set pieces from its films' productions. Depending on the film(s) being featured at each auction, the proceeds have gone to the FDNY Foundation, Food Bank For New York City, NYC Health + Hospitals, Queens Community House, Vidiots Foundation, Asian Mental Health Project, Transgender Law Center, and Laundry Workers Center.

== See also ==
- List of A24 Films
