= Open Wide (film) =

- Release poster
- Directed by: Sara Goldblatt
- Produced by: Cristina Costantini; Ben Cotner; Lucy Draper; Darren Foster; Sara Goldblatt; Nicole Quintero Ochoa
- Edited by: Jinx Godfrey; Daniel Lapira
- Music by: Ellen Reid
- Production companies: A24; Muck Media
- Distributed by: A24; Netflix
- Release date: January 23, 2024
- Running time: 108 minutes
- Countries: United States; United Kingdom; Australia
- Language: English

Open Wide is a 2024 documentary film directed and produced by Sara Goldblatt. The film follows John Mew's fringe theories suddenly find an enthusiastic audience online as his son takes up his war against orthodontics.

The film was available online at Netflix on January 23, 2024.

== Synopsis ==
John Mew’s fringe theories suddenly find an enthusiastic audience online as his son takes up his war against orthodontics. The gripping story of a father & son’s fight to redefine smiles and restore beauty in the modern world.

— A24

== Release ==
The film was released to Netflix on January 23, 2024.

== Reception ==
Jennifer Sandlin of Boing Boing stated in his review: "Open Wide was a incredibly interesting (and at times really unsettling) look at a subculture I previously knew very little about".
