= The Affair of the Mysterious Letter =

2019 novel by Alexis Hall

The Affair of the Mysterious Letter is a 2019 fantasy-detective novel by Alexis Hall. It was first published by Ace Books.

== Synopsis ==
When injured physician Captain John Wyndham moves into the spare room at 221B Martyrs Walk in the multidimensional city of Khelathra-Ven, he soon finds himself recruited by his new roommate, consulting sorceress Shaharazad Haas, in a quest to discover who is blackmailing Haas's ex-lover Eirene Viola.

== Reception ==
Publishers Weekly called it "zany queer and fantastical" and a "fun riff on canonical works of fantasy and detection" that "froths with magic and humor". The Chicago Review of Books lauded it as "an exciting romp through a truly imaginative universe (or, more accurately, multi-verse)", comparing Haas' cosmically aware nihilism to Rick Sanchez, and praising Hall's "wit and empathy", but also found that he too strongly emulated the prose of Arthur Conan Doyle in a way which was "enjoyable at first" but eventually "burdensome to the narrative."

James Nicoll considered it to be "hilarious", and noted its "ample LGBTQ+ representation", with "over-the-top unconventional" characters who are "queer as fuck".

Locus described it as "weird and witty", with Khelathra-Ven serving as a "fascinatingly warped" setting in which "the quirky characters hold the plot together," but nonetheless faulted it as "more a string of adventures than a cohesive mystery".
