= Alexis Hall (writer) =

English author

- Born: England
- Occupation: Novelist
- Writing career
- Period: 2012–present
- Genre: Romance
- Notable works: Boyfriend Material; The Affair of the Mysterious Letter
- Notable awards: RITA award – Erotic Romance; 2016 For Real: A Spires Story
- Website: quicunquevult.com

Alexis Hall is an English author of urban fantasy, science fiction, and LGBTQ romance. His (Note: Hall uses any pronouns. This article uses he/him pronouns for consistency and clarity.) novels include Boyfriend Material and The Affair of the Mysterious Letter.

Hall's work has been nominated three times for the Lambda Literary Award for Gay Romance.

== Career ==
A published author since 2013, Hall had released four romance books in 2022.

In 2021 Sourcebooks obtained the rights to Hall's Spires series, re-releasing the original four installments followed by two new stand-alone romances in the series.

In 2022, Paramount Pictures' Original Film production company obtained the rights to Rosaline Palmer Takes the Cake.

In 2024, For Real was included on Oprah Daily's list of the 25 best romance novels of all time.

== Bibliography ==
=== Winner Bakes All ===
- Rosaline Palmer Takes the Cake (18 May 2021)
- Paris Daillencourt is About to Crumble (1 November 2022)
- Audrey Lane Stirs the Pot (December 2025)

=== London Calling ===
- Boyfriend Material (7 July 2020)
- Husband Material (2 August 2022)
- 10 Things That Never Happened (17 October 2023)
- Father Material (2 June 2026)

=== Arden St. Ives ===
- How to Bang a Billionaire (16 April 2017)
- How to Blow It with a Billionaire (12 December 2017)
- How to Belong with a Billionaire (3 September 2019)

=== Spires ===
- Glitterland (15 May 2013)
- Aftermath (28 October 2013)
- Waiting for the Flood (21 February 2015)
- For Real (1 June 2015)
- In Vino (1 August 2016)
- Pansies (8 October 2016)

=== Something Fabulous ===
- Something Fabulous (25 January 2022)
- Something Spectacular (11 April 2023)
- Something Extraordinary (17 December 2024)

=== Kate Kane, Paranormal Investigator ===
- Iron & Velvet (14 December 2013)
- Shadows & Dreams (14 June 2014)
- Fire & Water (24 February 2020)
- Smoke & Ashes (12 November 2020)

=== Prosperityverse ===
- Prosperity (27 October 2014)
- There Will Be Phlogiston (6 December 2014)
- Liberty & Other Stories (4 January 2015)
  - Shackles
  - Squamous with a Chance of Rain
  - Cloudy Climes and Starless Skies
  - Liberty

=== Mortal Follies ===
- Mortal Follies (27 June 2023)
- Confounding Oaths (27 August 2024)

=== Standalone works ===
- Looking for Group (27 August 2016)
- The Affair of the Mysterious Letter (18 June 2019)
- Murder Most Actual (9 November 2021)
- A Lady for a Duke (24 May 2022)
- Hell's Heart (10 March 2026)
- Never After (7 April 2026)

=== & Other Monsters anthology ===
- Sand and Ruin and Gold (22 September 2014)

== Awards and reception ==
- 2016 - Romance Writers of America RITA Award for Erotic Romance – For Real: A Spires Story
- 2020 - New York Public Library Best Books for Adults – Boyfriend Material
- 2022 - New York Public Library Best Books for Adults – A Lady for a Duke
