= Comrade Detective =

2017 American/Romanian TV series

- Genre: Buddy cop; Meta historical fiction
- Created by: Brian Gatewood; Alessandro Tanaka
- Written by: Brian Gatewood; Alessandro Tanaka
- Directed by: Rhys Thomas
- Starring: Florin Piersic Jr.; Corneliu Ulici; Adrian Paduraru; Olivia Nita; Florin Galan; Diana Vladu; Ion Grosu
- Voices of: Channing Tatum; Joseph Gordon-Levitt; Nick Offerman; Jenny Slate; Jason Mantzoukas; Chloë Sevigny; Jake Johnson; John DiMaggio
- Composer: Joe Kraemer
- Country of origin: United States
- Original language: English
- No. of seasons: 1
- No. of episodes: 6

Production
- Executive producers: Andrew Schneider; Reid Carolin; Brian Gatewood; John Hodges; Peter Kiernan; Ravi Nandan; Alessandro Tanaka; Channing Tatum; Rhys Thomas
- Producer: Inman Young
- Cinematography: Sam Goldie
- Editors: Neil Mahoney; Nicholas Mansour
- Production companies: A24; Free Association; G & T Productions; Gallivant Films; Amazon Studios

Original release
- Network: Amazon Prime Video
- Release: August 4, 2017

Comrade Detective is an American buddy cop series created by Brian Gatewood and Alessandro Tanaka. The show follows the premise of popular US action/cop-buddy films and television shows from the 1980s and presents the episodes as a fictional lost Romanian television show commissioned by the Communist Party to promote a communist worldview during the Cold War. Every episode was filmed in Romania using local actors and then dubbed into English as part of the effect. It was released on Amazon Prime Video on August 4, 2017.

== Plot ==
Channing Tatum and Jon Ronson present the show as if it were an actual influential Romanian television show from the 1980s. Produced by the Romanian communist government, it served as a device to promote a communist worldview opposed to Western capitalism and imperialism during the Cold War. Lost over the years, producers recently found surviving copies of the episodes. With the help of the fictional Romanian Film Preservation Society they have restored the episodes and dubbed them into English.

Within the show hard-boiled but troubled Bucharest police detective Gregor Anghel and his partner respond to a drug bust against the orders of their Captain. This results in a man in a Ronald Reagan mask killing his partner in front of him. Anghel, along with his new partner from the countryside, Iosif Baciu, must solve his partner's murder. In doing so, they uncover an insidious western plot to indoctrinate Romanian society with capitalism and religion.

== Cast ==
Each character is portrayed by a Romanian actor, as well as an English-language voice actor. The show was first filmed using Romanian actors speaking Romanian. Actors then over-dubbed every role in English.

=== Main ===
- Florin Piersic Jr. as Gregor Anghel
  - Channing Tatum as English dub of Gregor Anghel
- Corneliu Ulici as Iosif Baciu
  - Joseph Gordon-Levitt as English dub of Iosif Baciu

=== Recurring ===
- Adrian Paduraru as Captain Covaci
  - Nick Offerman as English dub of Captain Covaci
- Olivia Nita as Jane
  - Jenny Slate as English dub of Jane
- Florin Galan as Dragos
  - Jason Mantzoukas as English dub of Dragos
- Diana Vladu as Sonya Baciu
  - Chloë Sevigny as English dub of Sonya Baciu
- Ion Grosu as Stan
  - Jake Johnson as English dub of Stan
- Tipsy Angelo as Tipsy
  - John DiMaggio as English dub of Tipsy and several other miscellaneous voice parts
- Channing Tatum as himself
- Jon Ronson as himself

=== Guest stars ===
- Richard Bovnoczki as Father Anton Streza
  - Daniel Craig as English dub of Father Anton Streza
- Cristian Popa as Nikita Ionescu
  - Beck Bennett as English dub of Nikita Ionescu
- Odin Neilsen as Andrei Baciu
  - Colleen O'Shaughnessey as English dub of Andrei Baciu
- Vali Pavel as Petre Bubescu
  - Bobby Cannavale as English dub of Petre Bubescu
- Radu Romaniuc as Orzan
  - Fred Armisen as English dub of Orzan.
- Ille Gâliea as Vasile
  - Tracy Letts as English dub of Vasile.
- Ruxandra Enescu as Sally Smith
  - Kim Basinger as English dub of Sally Smith
- Silviu Geamanu as Coach
  - Mahershala Ali as English dub of Coach
- Ana Ciontea as Iona Anghel
  - Debra Winger as English dub of Iona Anghel
- Cornel Ciupercescu as Vlad Anghel
  - Richard Jenkins as English dub of Vlad Anghel
- Paul Octavian Diaconescu as Nastase
  - Jerrod Carmichael as English dub of Nastase
- Mihai Stefan as Sergiu
  - Bo Burnham as English dub of Sergiu
- George Burcea as Todd
  - Mark Duplass as English dub of Todd
- Magda Dimitrescu as Tatiana/Trisha
  - Katie Aselton as English dub of Tatiana/Trisha
- Nicu Banea as Stefan
  - Mark Proksch as English dub of Stefan and several other parts
- Madalin Mladinovici as Markos Miklos
  - John Early as the English dub of Markos Miklos and several other parts.
- Cozma Eugeniu as New York Degenerate
  - Bobby Lee as English dub of New York Degenerate.

== Production ==
When first conceiving the series, executive producer Channing Tatum asked the creators to bring him the worst ideas they could think of, with the reasoning "When you try to find something that is not working, you figure out what's cool about it, and you can find some really hidden gems." Gatewood and Tanaka pitched a satire series that spoofed Communist propaganda from the 1980s. The two had become fascinated with Soviet propaganda television after seeing a mid-1980s PBS documentary on Soviet broadcasts. They initially looked into dubbing over real Eastern Bloc television shows but realized it would be easier to make their own show rather than procure the rights.

The series takes inspiration from the Czechoslovak show Thirty Cases of Major Zeman. They also took inspiration from the idea that growing up, American 1980s movies like Red Dawn served as both entertainment and propaganda. It also took inspiration from the East German series Polizeiruf 110 and the American film Lethal Weapon. By making the propaganda and inaccuracies obvious to a western audience, they hoped to make the subtle nature of modern propaganda more clear. Tanaka stated that the goal was to create the inverse Soviet equivalent of the type of Russian-villain entertainment common in 1980s America.

Episodes were initially written in English before being translated into Romanian. The shows were filmed in Romania with local cast. Other than the director of photography, writers and director, the entire cast and crew were locally recruited in Romania. The English-language actors were only cast after the series had been filmed and edited.

== Episodes ==
No.	Title	Directed by	Written by	Original release date
1	"The Invisible Hand"	Rhys Thomas	Brian Gatewood, Alex Tanaka	August 4, 2017
Detective Anghel witnesses his partner's murder. He and his new partner Baciu hunt the man in the Reagan mask. Guest appearances by Kim Basinger, Beck Bennett, Jerrod Carmichael, Bo Burnham, Sandy Martin, John Early, Mark Proksch, and Jon Ronson.
2	"No Exit"	Rhys Thomas	Brian Gatewood, Alex Tanaka	August 4, 2017
The detectives uncover a conspiracy to smuggle the western board game Monopoly into the country. Guest appearances by Richard Jenkins, Debra Winger, Kimmy Gatewood, Aly Ward Azevedo, Colleen O'Shaughnessey, and Tracy Letts.
3	"Bread is Bread"	Rhys Thomas	Brian Gatewood, Alex Tanaka	August 4, 2017
Continuing to investigate the murder, the detectives must battle against the forces of organized religion. Guest appearances by Daniel Craig, Betsy Sodaro, John Early, and Jon Ronson.
4	"Two Films for One Ticket"	Rhys Thomas	Brian Gatewood, Alex Tanaka	August 4, 2017
Undercover, the detectives infiltrate a western-style party full of debauchery and propaganda. Guest appearances by Bobby Cannavale, Mahershala Ali, Fred Armisen, Aly Ward Azevedo, Colleen O'Shaughnessey, John Early, Katie Aselton, Mark Duplass and Bobby Lee.
5	"The Whole World is Watching"	Rhys Thomas	Brian Gatewood, Alex Tanaka	August 4, 2017
On the run as fugitives, the detectives must seek refuge from an unlikely source: the American embassy. Guest appearances by Aly Ward Azevedo, Colleen O'Shaughnessey, Kate Berlant and Mark Proksch.
6	"Survival of the Fittest"	Rhys Thomas	Brian Gatewood, Alex Tanaka	August 4, 2017
The two race against time to stop the man in the Reagan mask from claiming another victim. Guest appearances by Daniel Craig, Beck Bennett and Mark Proksch.

== Reception ==
Comrade Detective received mostly positive reactions from critics. Rotten Tomatoes indicated that 82% of critics gave the series a positive review. On Metacritic the series received a score of 66 out of 100 based on 12 critics.

Ben Travers of IndieWire gave the show a positive review, calling it a sharp satire. He focused in on the show's goal of deconstructing propaganda, claiming, "They're not simply here to make you laugh. They're not here to upset you. They're here to make you think differently and enjoy your time doing it. By that gauge, Comrade Detective is a roaring success. By the basic metric of thoroughly engaging television, it's still a winner."

James Poniewozik of The New York Times gave it a less enthusiastic review, claiming that the show committed too much to its initial joke and ran too long. He concluded, "It's a brilliant idea. But it's not much more than an idea."

== See also ==
- Romanian profanity
