= Rose Glass =

British filmmaker and screenwriter

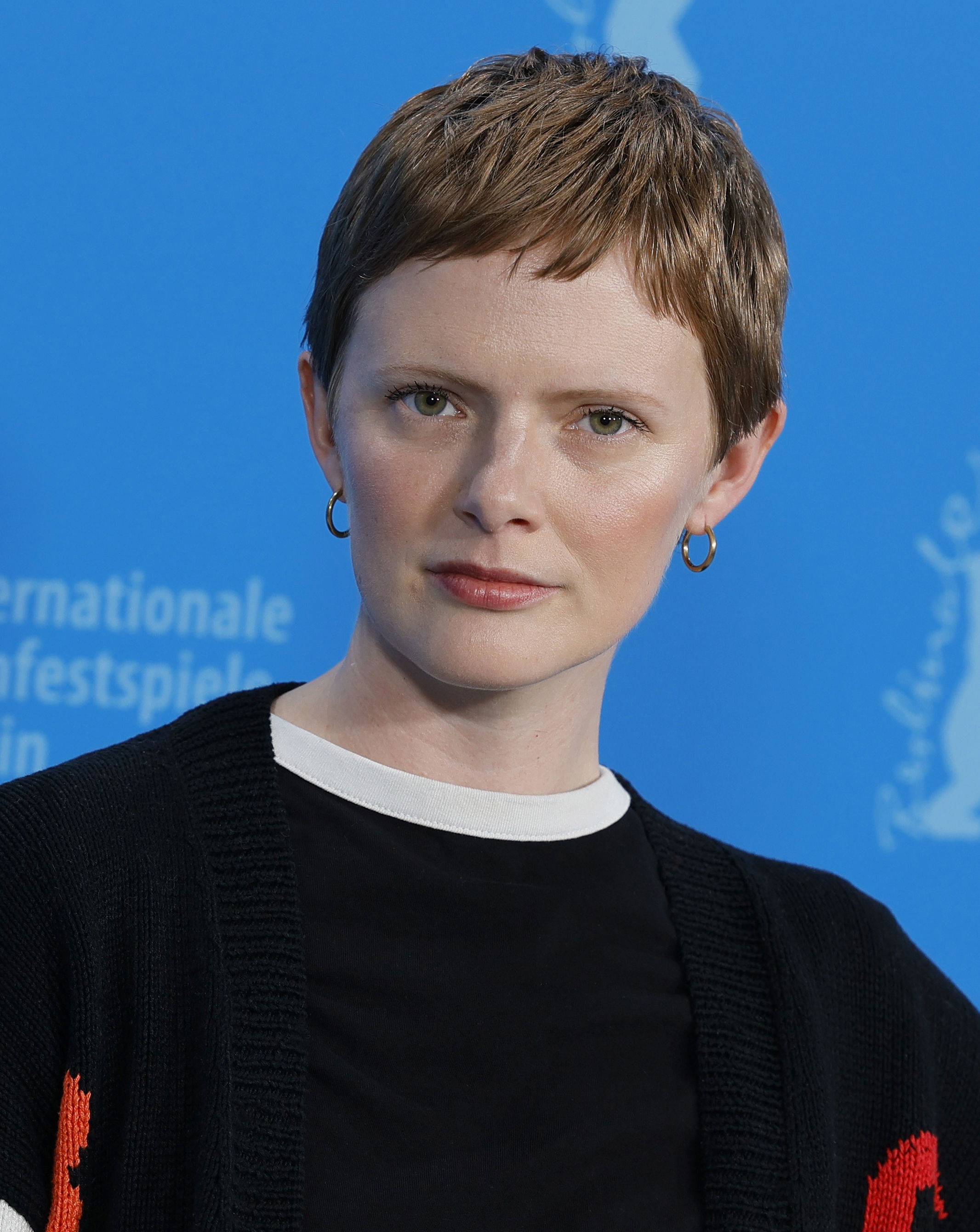
- Glass at the 2024 Berlinale
- Born: 1990 (age 35–36); London, England
- Occupations: Filmmaker; director; screenwriter
- Years active: 2010–present
- Notable work: Saint Maud; Love Lies Bleeding

Rose Glass (born 1990) is an English film director and screenwriter. She made her feature film debut with the psychological horror film Saint Maud (2019), which was nominated for two awards at the 74th British Academy Film Awards. Glass won Best Debut Director at the 2020 British Independent Film Awards. Her second feature film Love Lies Bleeding had its premiere at the 2024 Sundance Film Festival in January 2024.

== Early life ==
Glass was born in London, England and grew up in Essex. Glass was raised Catholic. Starting aged 12, Glass created home videos with her friends, dabbling in stop-motion and films about aliens.

Glass attended New Hall School and Hurtwood House. She went on to graduate from London College of Communication and then the National Film and Television School in 2014. Over the course of her studies, she wrote and directed five short films including Room 55 and Storm House. She also worked as a runner on film sets.

== Career ==
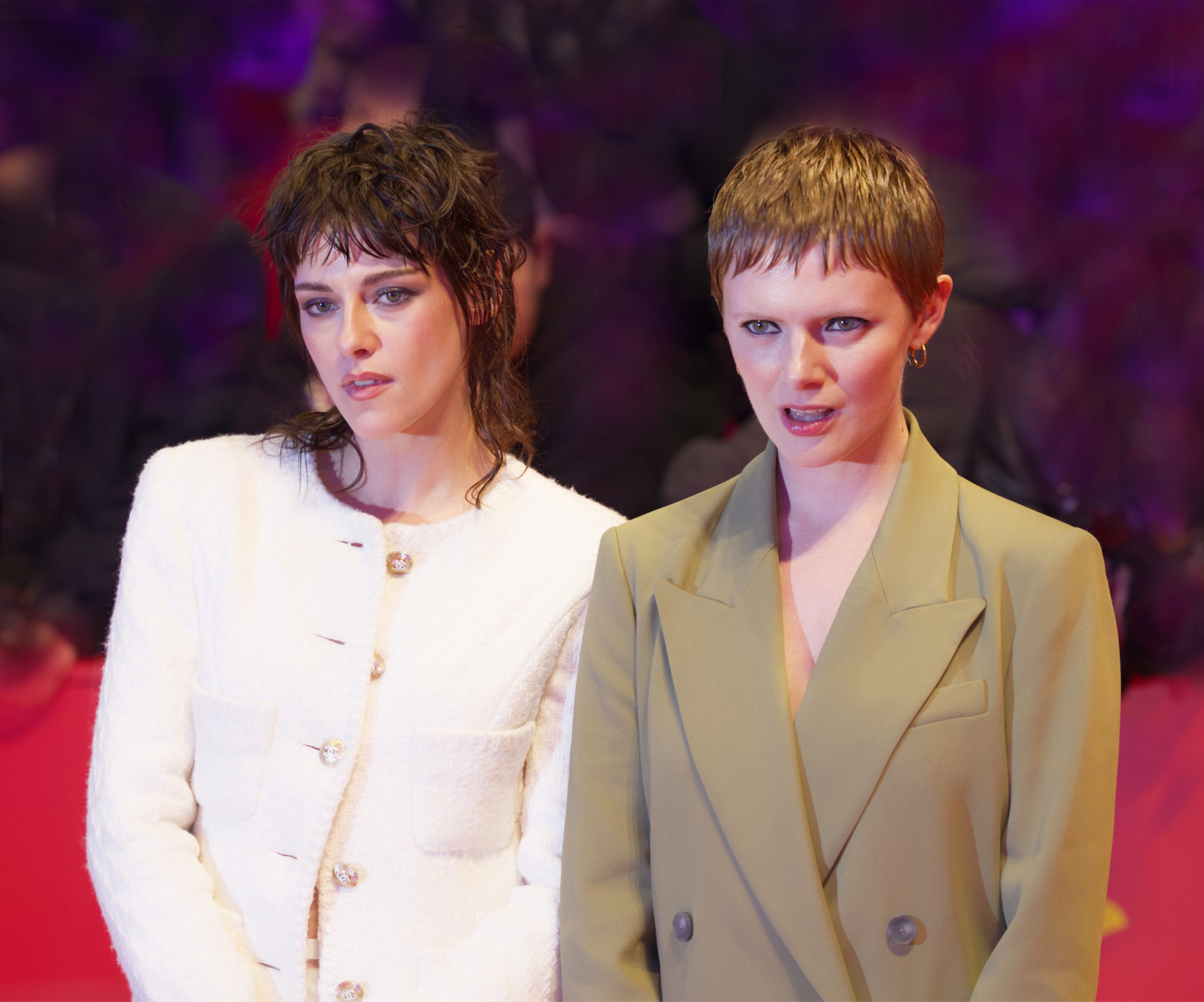
Glass with Kristen Stewart (left) at the 2024 Berlin International Film Festival

=== Saint Maud ===
Shot in 2018, Glass gained prominence through her feature length directorial and screenwriting debut, the psychological horror film Saint Maud. The story follows the titular hospice nurse who, having converted to Catholicism, becomes obsessed with one of her charges, believing she must save her soul. Saint Maud premiered at the Toronto International Film Festival on 8 September 2019, and had a UK theatrical release on 9 October 2020 via StudioCanal UK.

In 2019, Glass won the IWC Schaffhausen Filmmaker Bursary Award. In late 2020, Glass was nominated for and won Best Debut Director at the British Independent Film Awards. In early 2021, Saint Maud was nominated for two awards at the 74th British Academy Film Awards, including a nomination for Glass in the category of Outstanding Debut by a British Writer, Director or Producer. In a five star review of Saint Maud, film critic Mark Kermode called Glass "a thrilling new talent in British cinema". Noted director Danny Boyle has called Glass "an extraordinary talent and powerful storyteller" with a "singular vision".

=== Love Lies Bleeding ===
In March 2022, American actor Kristen Stewart announced she would be working with Glass on her follow up to Saint Maud, a romantic thriller entitled Love Lies Bleeding, developed by Film4 and A24. Glass collaborated with Weronika Tofilska on the screenplay for Love Lies Bleeding. The story follows the tumultuous relationship between Lou (Stewart), a reclusive gym manager from a criminal family, and Jackie (Katy O'Brian), an ambitious bodybuilder. Glass wanted to create a "visceral" project, inspired by body horror and violent films, the psychological opportunities that came from a story about a female bodybuilder, and female bodybuilders of the 1940s and 50s: "These women had amazing '50s pin-curl hairdos and incredible muscular physiques, and the visual juxtaposition was intriguing to me".

The film had its world premiere in the Midnight section at the 2024 Sundance Film Festival, and was set for theatrical releases in the U.S. on 8 March 2024 by A24 and by Lionsgate in the UK on 19 April 2024. Love Lies Bleeding was named one of the Top 10 Independent Films of 2024 by the National Board of Review. The film had a budget of 10 million dollars and made 12.8 million, making it a modest box office hit. At the 2024 British Independent Film Awards, Love Lies Bleeding was nominated for three awards, including Best Director and Best Screenplay. In 2025, Love Lies Bleeding was nominated for ‘Outstanding British Film of the Year’ at the British Academy Film Awards.

=== In development ===
Glass has not said much about her next project, but has revealed she has been working on it since Sundance of 2024 and plans to write and direct it solo. She also expressed that she did not want to direct TV or direct scripts from other screenwriters, preferring to have control over writing and directing her own work for now.

== Influences ==
In an interview with the Los Angeles Times in 2021, Glass credited filmmakers such as David Cronenberg, John Waters and David Lynch as major inspirations for her growing up.

Glass cited Misery as an early inspiration for Saint Maud.

Glass provided a 2024 interview with the Associated Press for the release of Love Lies Bleeding in which Glass spoke about utilizing the 1995 Paul Verhoeven-directed Showgirls as a means to demonstrate to the cast the overall setting and tone of the film.

== Filmography ==
Short film
Year	Title	Director	Writer
2010	Moths	Yes	Yes
2011	Storm House	Yes	Yes
2013	The Silken Strand	Yes	Yes
2014	Room 55	Yes	Yes
2015	Bath Time	Yes	Yes

Feature film
Year	Title	Director	Writer
2019	Saint Maud	Yes	Yes
2024	Love Lies Bleeding	Yes	Yes

== Awards and nominations ==
Awards and nominations
Award	Year	Category	Work	Result	Ref.
British Academy Film Awards	2021	Outstanding British Film of the Year	Saint Maud	Nominated	
British Academy Film Awards	2021	Outstanding Debut by a British Writer, Director, or Producer	Saint Maud	Nominated	
British Academy Film Awards	2025	Outstanding British Film of the Year	Love Lies Bleeding	Nominated	
British Independent Film Awards	2021	Best British Independent Film	Saint Maud	Nominated	
British Independent Film Awards	2021	Best Screenplay	Saint Maud	Nominated	
British Independent Film Awards	2024	Best British Independent Film	Love Lies Bleeding	Nominated	
British Independent Film Awards	2024	Best Director	Love Lies Bleeding	Nominated	
British Independent Film Awards	2024	Best Screenplay	Love Lies Bleeding	Nominated	
London Critics Circle Film Awards	2021	Director of the Year	Saint Maud	Nominated	
London Critics Circle Film Awards	2021	Screenwriter of the Year	Saint Maud	Nominated	
London Critics Circle Film Awards	2021	Breakthrough British/Irish Filmmaker of the Year	Saint Maud	Won	
London Critics Circle Film Awards	2021	British/Irish Film of the Year	Saint Maud	Won	
Fangoria Chainsaw Awards	2021	Best First Feature	Saint Maud	Won	
Fangoria Chainsaw Awards	2021	Best Director	Saint Maud	Nominated	
Fangoria Chainsaw Awards	2021	Best Screenplay	Saint Maud	Nominated	
