= Boyfriend Material =

2020 novel by Alexis Hall

- Author: Alexis Hall
- Language: English
- Series: London Calling
- Genre: LGBTQ; romantic comedy
- Publication date: 7 July 2020
- ISBN: 1728206146
- Followed by: Husband Material

Boyfriend Material is a 2020 contemporary romance novel by Alexis Hall. It centers on the character of Luc O'Donnell, the only child of two 1980s rock stars, and his romantic relationship with Oliver Blackwood, a barrister.

Hall has stated that the novel was directly inspired by the Richard Curtis rom-coms of the 1990s and early 2000s, such as Notting Hill, Four Weddings and a Funeral, and Love Actually.

== Synopsis ==
Luc O'Donnell is tangentially—and reluctantly—famous. His rock star parents split when he was young, and the father he's never met spent the next twenty years cruising in and out of rehab. Now that his dad's making a comeback, Luc's back in the public eye, and one compromising photo is enough to ruin everything.

To clean up his image, Luc has to find a nice, normal relationship...and Oliver Blackwood is as nice and normal as they come. He's a barrister, an ethical vegetarian, and he's never inspired a moment of scandal in his life. In other words: perfect boyfriend material. Unfortunately, apart from being gay, single, and really, really in need of a date for a big event, Luc and Oliver have nothing in common. So they strike a deal to be publicity-friendly (fake) boyfriends until the dust has settled. Then they can go their separate ways and pretend it never happened.

But the thing about fake-dating is that it can feel a lot like real-dating. And that's when you get used to someone. Start falling for them. Don't ever want to let them go.

== Characters ==
- Lucien "Luc" O'Donnell – the main character of the story. He is a gay man, 28 years old, working for a charity named Coleoptera Research and Protection Project (CRAPP), which is working to save the dung beetle.
- Oliver Blackwood – a gay man and ethical vegetarian. He works as a barrister.
- Bridget – Luc and Oliver's mutual friend. She is the girlfriend of Tom, and is working for a publishing company.

=== Luc's family ===
- Odile O'Donnell – Luc's mother
- Jon Fleming – Luc's father, a disgraced rock star that was involved in the past in multiple scandals. Jon stars as a mentor at a new singing reality show named "The Whole Package". He left Luc and his mother when Luc was 3 years old.

=== Luc's friends ===
- Priya – one of Luc's friends, and is described by him as "a tiny lesbian with multicoloured extensions". Priya works as an artist, she is very cynical and she drives a truck which is used multiple times to drive Luc and the other friends when private transport is needed.
- James Royce-Royce & James Royce-Royce – 2 gay men that are married to each other and share the same name. One of them is working as a chef and is described by Luc as "phenomenally camp", while the other is very shy and works at a job that includes complex mathematics.
- Tom – Bridget's boyfriend. Tom went on a couple of dates with Luc, but then Luc introduced him to Bridget and he decided to stop seeing him and start dating her.

=== Oliver's family ===
- David Blackwood – Oliver's father. He works as an accountant and has been married to Miriam for 40 years.
- Miriam Blackwood – Oliver's mother, she used to be a fellow at London School of Economics but gave it up to raise her children.
- Christopher Blackwood – Oliver's brother. He is married to Mia and together they are doing disaster relief in Mozambique. Christopher looks like his brother, although he is slightly taller, his eyes are bluer and his hair is lighter.
- Mia – Christopher's wife.
- Jim – David's younger brother.

=== Oliver's friends ===
- Jennifer – a human rights lawyer who likes hippos, married to Peter.
- Peter – Jennifer's husband, works as a children's illustrator.
- Brian – a former law student that decided to work in IT instead. He's married to Amanda.
- Amanda – Brian's wife
- Ben – stay-at-home dad, married to Sophie. They are the parents of twins.
- Sophie – Ben's wife. Sophie works as a lawyer and is criticised by her friends for working for big corporations rather than charities like them.

== Reception ==
Entertainment Weekly, Business Insider, and Bustle all named Boyfriend Material one of the Best Romance Novels of 2020. New York Public Library listed it as one of the Best Books of 2020. The novel was nominated for the Goodreads Choice Award for Best Romance, coming in fifth place.

A Publishers Weekly review called it "a triumph" and said that "Hall breathes new life into the fake dating trope with this effervescent queer rom-com."

Olivia Waite, from The New York Times, called the series, "...terrifically funny. Not just tonally upbeat in the way of many so-called rom-coms, but text-your-friends, chortle-'til-you-cry funny."

== Sequels ==
The novel's sequel, titled Husband Material, was released in August 2022. A third novel, entitled Father Material, will be released in June 2026, completing the trilogy.

10 Things That Never Happened, a spin-off novel following different characters, including one who was introduced in Husband Material, was released in October 2023. There is a second spin-off novel with the working title Material World Book 2 and an unknown release date "featuring Tyler from Husband Material."

== See also ==
- Red, White & Royal Blue
- Simon vs. the Homo Sapiens Agenda
