= Leeds International Film Festival =

Film festival

- Location: Leeds, England
- Founded: 1987; 39 years ago
- Language: International
- Website: leedsfilm.com

The Leeds International Film Festival (LIFF) is an annual film festival hosted in Leeds, West Yorkshire, England. It is the largest film festival in England outside of London. Founded in 1987, it is held in November in various venues throughout Leeds, including Hyde Park Picture House and Cottage Road Cinema. In 2022, the festival showed 140 films from 78 countries, shorts and features, both commercial and independent.

LIFF features five programme sections: Official Selection, Retrospective, Cinema Versa, Fanomenon and Short Film City. LIFF is a qualifying film festival for the Academy Awards and the winning films in Short Film City's Louis Le Prince International Short Film Competition and World Animation Award may thus be eligible for the academy's Short Film Awards. The festival's British Short Film Competition is BAFTA qualifying.

The festival is supported by Leeds City Council and the festival office is based in Leeds Town Hall, together with Leeds Young Film Festival (LYFF), formerly Leeds Children & Young People's Film Festival (LCYPFF).

== LIFF Programme Sections and Awards ==
Leeds International Film Festival's programme has five categories: Official Selection, Retrospective, Cinema Versa, Fanomenon and Short Film City. Fanomenon and Short Film City host various short film competitions, some of which qualify their winners for major film awards such as the Academy Awards. Moreover, the festival audience votes for their favourite feature film from all screenings. These votes determine the winner of the festival's Audience Award, as well as the extra screenings of Film Festival Favourites towards the end of the festival.

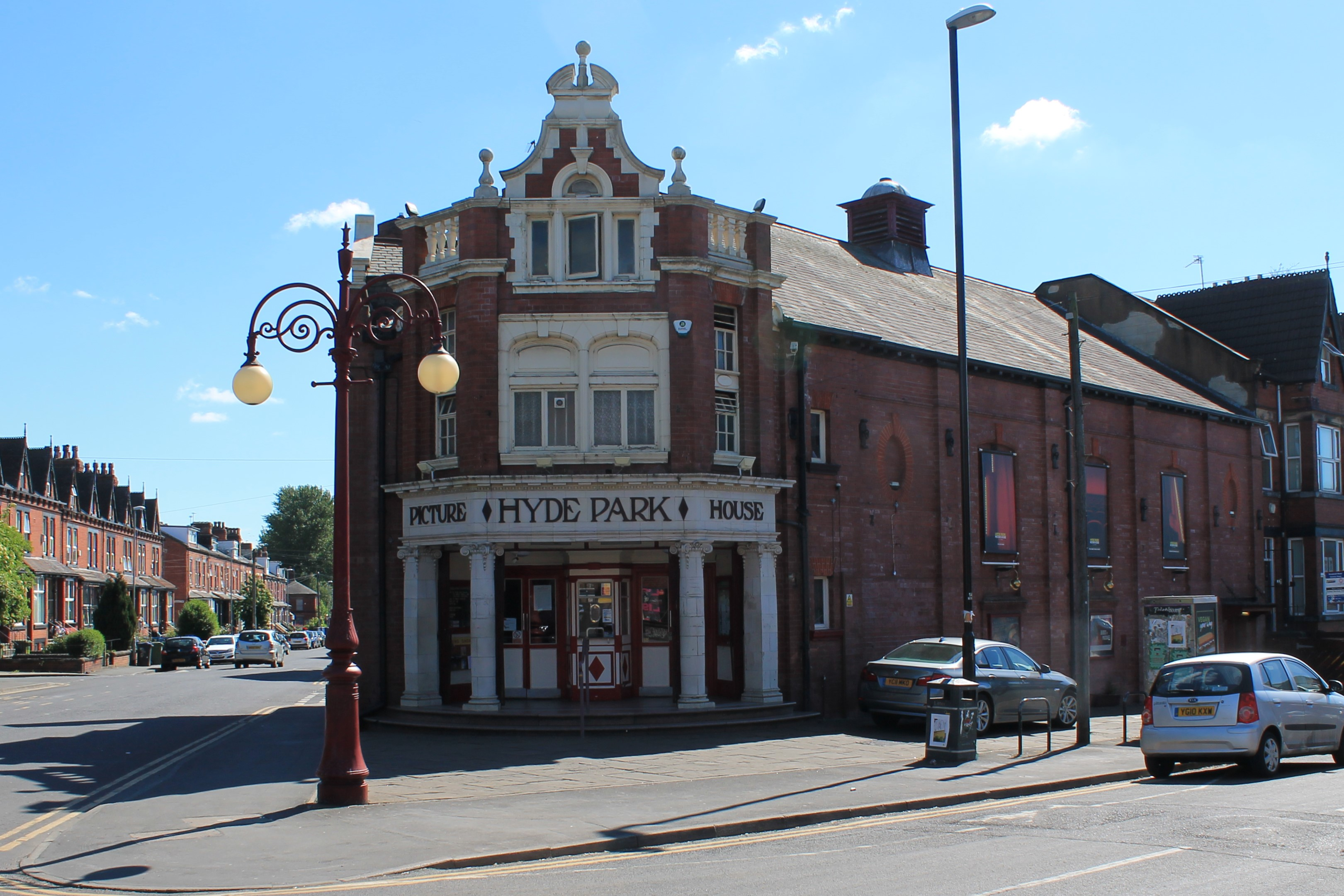
The Hyde Park Picture House is an arthouse cinema in Leeds, which has hosted LIFF selections since the inaugural festival.

=== Official Selection ===
The Official Selection hosts special previews and screenings of some of the most anticipated and acclaimed films of the year, as well as showcasing new discoveries from international independent filmmaking. Many of these have celebrated prizewinning successes at other major festivals such as Cannes or the Berlin International Film Festival.

=== Retrospective ===
Every year, LIFF shows a broad array of retrospective programmes, giving audiences the opportunity to watch forgotten films as well as celebrated classics on the big screen.

=== Cinema Versa ===
Cinema Versa is dedicated to the documentary and inspired by the underground festival aesthetic, showcasing low budget, independent features. The programme's Music on Film section shows a range of old and new musical and film styles. Underground Voices, another Cinema Versa section, provides a platform for Human rights and activist films. Cinema Versa's Forum presents a series of special events.

=== Fanomenon ===
Fanomenon is the home of cult and fantasy cinema at LIFF. It presents new genre films, cult-subject documentaries, animated features, rarely-screened classics and movie marathons. Each year, beginning in 2001, the festival has played host to the Night of the Dead, an all-night horror-thon. The 2014 festival introduced a single day of back to back anime films at Leeds Town Hall, repeated in 2015. Fanomenon also hosts the Dead Short Competition for horror shorts.

=== Short Film City ===
Short Film City hosts the festival's short film competitions and panoramas, as well as special events and exhibitions. The Louis le Prince International Short Film Competition is named after Louis le Prince, a French born film pioneer living in Leeds who made the first ever moving pictures in 1888. The Louis le Prince Competition, as well as the World Animation award are qualifying competitions for the Academy Awards. The festival's British Short Film Competition is BAFTA qualifying. Additionally, Short Film City hosts the Yorkshire Short Film Competition and added three new competitions in 2014: The Leeds Screendance Competition, the Leeds International Music Video Awards and the Leeds Short Film Audience Award.

== Festivals by year ==
=== The 2020s ===
2025 festival

The Leeds International Film Festival 2025 took place 30 October - 17 November 2025. The opening film was Richard Linklater's Blue Moon and the closing film was Hlymur Pálmason's The Love That Remains. The Audience Award for Fiction Feature was won by The Voice of Hind Rajab and the Audience Award for Documentary Feature by Celtic Utopia.

- 2024 festival

The Leeds International Film Festival 2024 took place 1–17 November 2024. The opening film was Carine Tardieu's The Ties That Bind Us, and the closing film was Shô Miyake's drama All the Long Nights. The winner of the Audience Award for Fiction Feature was Adam Elliot's animation Memoir of a Snail and for the Documentary Feature, the award went to No Other Land, directed by Basel Adra, Hamdan Ballal and Yuval Abraham.

- 2023 festival

The Leeds International Film Festival 2023 took place 3–19 November 2023. The opening film was Yorgos Lanthimos' absurdist black comedy Poor Things, and the closing film was Marija Kavtaradze's romantic drama film Slow. The winner of the Audience Award for Fiction Feature was Mohamed Kordofani's Goodbye Julia and for the Documentary Feature, the award went to Paul Sng's Tish.

- 2022 festival

The Leeds International Film Festival 2022 took place 3–17 November 2022. The opening film was the life affirming drama Living, and the closing film was Charlotte Wells' film Aftersun. The winner of the Audience Award for Fiction Feature was The Blue Caftan and for the Documentary Feature was A Bunch of Amateurs.

- 2021 festival

The Leeds International Film Festival 2021 took place 3–18 November 2021. The opening film was Pablo Larrain's film Spencer, and the closing film was Clio Barnard's acclaimed new drama Ali & Ava. The winner for the Audience Award for Fiction Feature was La Traviata, My Brothers and I and for the Documentary Feature, Alien on Stage.

- 2020 festival

The Leeds International Film Festival 2020 took place online, due to restrictions caused by the COVID-19 pandemic.

=== The 2010s ===
- 2019 festival

The Leeds International Film Festival 2019 took place 6–21 November 2019. The opening film was the female-led drama Rocks, and the closing film was Taika Waititi's comedy Jojo Rabbit, which also won the Audience Award for fiction feature. The winner of the Audience Award for documentary feature was the Syrian film The Cave. The Retrospective strand ran under the title "Mother Cutter: Women Who Shaped Film", featuring films with female editors.

- 2018 festival

The Leeds International Film Festival 2018 took place 1–15 November 2018. The opening films were the world premiere of Fighting for a City, a documentary about the Leeds boxer Josh Warrington, and Boots Riley's satire Sorry to Bother You; the closing film was Hirokazu Kore-eda's Palme d'Or-winning drama Shoplifters. The Retrospective strand ran under the title "Time Frames", featuring films that take place within 24 hours. The winner of the Audience Award for Fiction Feature was Capernaum and for Documentary Feature was The Dawn Wall.

- 2017 festival

The Leeds International Film Festival 2017 took place 1–16 November 2017. The official selection opened with Ruben Östlund's Palme d'Or-winning The Square and closed with Martin McDonagh's comedy-drama Three Billboards Outside Ebbing, Missouri, which also won the Audience Award. The Cinema Versa strand opened with Jane, about the primatologist Jane Goodall, and closed with Frederick Wiseman's Ex Libris: The New York Public Library. The Fanomenon strand opened with Yorgos Lanthimos's The Killing of a Sacred Deer and closed with Lynne Ramsay's You Were Never Really Here.

- 2016 festival

The 30th Leeds International Film Festival took place 3–17 November 2016. The festival opened with Jim Jarmusch's drama Paterson, screened with the Spanish short film Timecode, and closed with the German comedy-drama Toni Erdmann. The winner of the Audience Award was the comedy Mindhorn, set and filmed on the Isle of Man.

- 2015 festival

The 29th Leeds International Film Festival took place 5–19 November 2015 and attracted more than 40,000 visitors. It opened with John Crowley's period drama feature film Brooklyn, which for the first time in the history of LIFF was joined by an opening short film, Sanjay's Super Team, and closed with Todd Haynes's historical drama Carol. The Audience Award for Best Feature Film was won by the Hungarian black comedy Liza, the Fox-Fairy.

- 2014 festival

The 28th Leeds International Film Festival took place 5–20 November. The festival opened with James Kent's First World War drama Testament of Youth, which was filmed primarily in Yorkshire, and closed with the UK premiere of Alejandro González Iñárritu's black comedy Birdman or (The Unexpected Virtue of Ignorance). The New Zealand mockumentary What We Do in the Shadows won the festival's Audience Award for Best Film.

- 2013 festival

The 27th festival took place 6–21 November 2013. The Opening Gala was two 3D screenings of Alfonso Cuarón's film Gravity, two days ahead of its official release, and the festival closed with the romantic mashup film Final Cut: Ladies and Gentlemen. The Rocket won the Audience Award for Best Film.

- 2012 festival

The 26th Leeds International Film Festival took place from 1–18 November 2012, with a screening of Ben Affleck's historical thriller Argo for the opening gala, and Michael Haneke's drama Amour as the closing gala. The Retrospective category was added to the festival's programme. Moreover, LIFF's Louis le Prince International Short Film Competition and the World Animation Award have been Academy Awards-qualifying since 2012. The festival's Audience Award for Best Film was won by The Hunt.

- 2011 festival

The 25th edition of the Leeds International Film Festival took place from 3–20 November 2011, with a screening of Andrea Arnold's Wuthering Heights for the Opening Gala, and Steve McQueen's Shame as the closing film. In 2011, the Audience Awards for best feature films were given to each programme category individually. The Artist won the Official Selection Audience Award, Sound It Out won the Cinema Versa Audience Award and Juan of the Dead won the Fanomenon Audience Award. Koen Mortier won the Golden Owl Award for best independent filmmaking for his thriller film 22nd of May.

- 2010 festival

The 24th Leeds International Film Festival took place from 4–21 November 2010, with some tickets on sale from April. The festival opened with a screening of Tom Hooper's The King's Speech, which also won the Audience Award for best Feature Film. Petter Næss's Elling won the Audience Award for best Archive Film. The overall Audience Award went to Piers Sanderson for his film High on Hope. The Golden Owl Award for best independent filmmaking was won by Radu Muntean for Tuesday, After Christmas.

=== The 2000s ===
- 2009 festival

The 23rd Leeds International Film Festival took place from 4–22 November 2009, showing a range of films from all over the world, including the opening film The Men Who Stare at Goats, directed by Grant Heslov. Miyazaki's latest anime, Ponyo, won the Audience Award. The jury awarded the Golden Owl Award to La Pivellina, directed by Tizza Covi and Rainer Frimmel. At Section "Paras International Documentary Short" Documentary film "The Wooden Carpet" was won.

- 2008 festival

The 22nd Leeds International Film Festival was held from 4–16 November 2008. It opened with a screening of Dominique Abel's and Fiona Gordon's comedy film Rumba. Short Film City was introduced as a distinct programme category in 2008.

- 2007 festival

The 21st Leeds International Film Festival, held 7–18 November 2007, had five sections: Official Selection, Fanomenon, Cinema Versa, Nexus and a Kazuo Hara Retrospective. Persepolis, directed by Vincent Paronnaud and Marjane Satrapi was shown at the Opening Gala.

- 2006 festival

The 20th edition of the Leeds International Film Festival was held 2–12 November 2006 and opened with a screening of the comedy-drama film Venus, directed by Roger Michell.

- 2005 festival

The 19th Leeds International Film Festival took place 3–13 November 2005. At its Opening Gala, it showed Merry Christmas by Christian Carion.

- 2004 festival

The 18th Leeds International Film Festival was held 28 October to 7 November 2004 and opened with a screening of Finding Neverland, directed by Marc Forster. Several new competitions were launched in 2004. The Golden Owls Award for feature films was launched to support under-represented independent filmmaking. Additionally, animated short films could now enter their own World Animation Competition and all short films were eligible for the FilmFour Short Film Audience Award.

- 2003 festival

The 17th Leeds International Film Festival was held 2–12 October 2003 and opened with Stephen Fry's Bright Young Things.

- 2002 festival

The 16th Leeds International Film Festival took place 3–13 October 2002. The three opening films of the festival were Sweet Sixteen, directed by Ken Loach (Ken Loach), Lilo & Stitch by Dean DeBlois and Possession, a romantic mystery drama directed by Neil LaBute.

- 2001 festival

The 15th Leeds International Film Festival was held 27 September to 12 October 2001 and opened with a screening of Crush, directed by John McKay.

- 2000 festival

The 14th Leeds International Film festival took place 5–19 October 2000. Purely Belter, a British comedy drama film directed by Mark Herman was shown at the Opening Ceremony. In 2000, Fanomenon was introduced as an official programme category at LIFF.

=== The 1990s ===
- 1999 festival

The 13th Leeds International Film Festival took place 7 to 23 October 1999 and opened with a screening of Fanny & Elvis by Kay Mellor. This year, the festival was taken over by a festival director, Chris Fell, who is the director of the festival to this day. Moreover, the Louis le Prince Short Film Competition was introduced, as well as ‘Evolution’, a new programme strand for films between film, TV and the interactive (gaming) entertainment industry.

- 1998 festival

The 12th Leeds International Film Festival took place 2–17 October 1998. A Perfect Murder, directed by Andrew Davis, was screened at the Opening Gala.

- 1997 festival

The 11th Leeds International Film Festival was held 16–31 October 1997. The festival's theme was Science Fiction and the film screened at the Opening Gala was Tim Hurran's Girl’s Night.

- 1996 festival

The 10th anniversary edition of the Leeds International Film Festival was held 3–18 October 1996 and opened with a screening of Brassed Off, directed by Mark Herman. The festival had Conflicts of Interest as its central theme.

- 1995 festival

The 9th Leeds International Film Festival took place 12–27 October 1995. It opened with a screening of Tony Scott's Crimson Tide. Liz Rymer became the new director of the festival, which had two major strands: the Western and Animation.

- 1994 festival

The 8th edition of the Leeds International Film Festival was held 13–28 October 1994. At its Opening Gala, War of the Buttons, directed by John Rogers, was shown. Also, the festival was taken over by a new director, Kath Baker, and the new short film audience award was introduced.

- 1993 festival

The 7th Leeds International Film Festival took place 14–29 October 1993 and opened with a screening of The Secret Garden, directed by Agnieszka Holland. The festival's main theme was The City in Cinema. A documentary strand was added to the programme and short films shown before nearly every feature.

- 1992 festival

The 6th Leeds International Film Festival took place 16–31 October 1992. Peter Kosminski's film adaptation Emily Brontë's Wuthering Heights was the Opening Gala film. The festival's central themes were Music and Spain.

- 1991 festival

The 5th edition of the Leeds International Film Festival was held 11–26 October 1991 and had BODY and MIND, as well as ‘MAN’ and MACHINE as its central themes. The film shown at the Opening Gala was Point Break, directed by Kathryn Bigelow.

- 1990 festival

The 4th Leeds International Film Festival took place 12–27 October 1990. It opened with a screening of John Badham's action comedy film Bird on a Wire. Following the political upheavals of the recent months, Freedom and censorship were the central themes of the festival.

=== The 1980s ===
- 1989 festival

The 3rd Leeds International Film Festival was held 13–28 October 1989 and was also a celebration of the 75th anniversary of the Hyde Park Picture House, Leeds. The festival opened with a screening of Lewis Gilbert's Shirley Valentine.

- 1988 festival

Following the great success of the first Leeds International Film Festival, the festival's second edition was held 13–29 October 1988. The second Leeds International Film festival was much bigger than the first and coincided with the centenary of Louis le Prince's first moving picture taking in 1888. The opening film of the festival was La Bohème, directed by Luigi Comencini.

- 1987 festival

the first ever Leeds International Film Festival took place 7–19 March 1987, to great success. The British horror film Gothic, directed by Ken Russell was shown at the Opening Gala. Director and co-founder of the festival was Janice Campbell.

== Leeds Young Film Festival ==
Leeds Young Film Festival takes place every Easter and welcomes young people and their families to the largest film event of its kind in the North of England. Now in its 16th year, the festival features a programme of new and unseen cinema for young people from around the world, as well as classic screenings, moving-image related workshops and masterclasses. The festival also hosts two young filmmaking competitions: The Leeds Young Filmmakers' Golden Owl Awards celebrates the best of young people's filmmaking across the city. The INDIs (Independent Directions) Young Filmmaker Award, a national competition to showcase the work of young filmmakers working without professional support or funding. The organisation works closely with a group of young consultants aged 14–19 called MediaFish, who help programme, design and deliver the festival, make films and shape the strategy of Leeds Young Film.
