= Hyde Park Picture House =

Cinema in Leeds, England

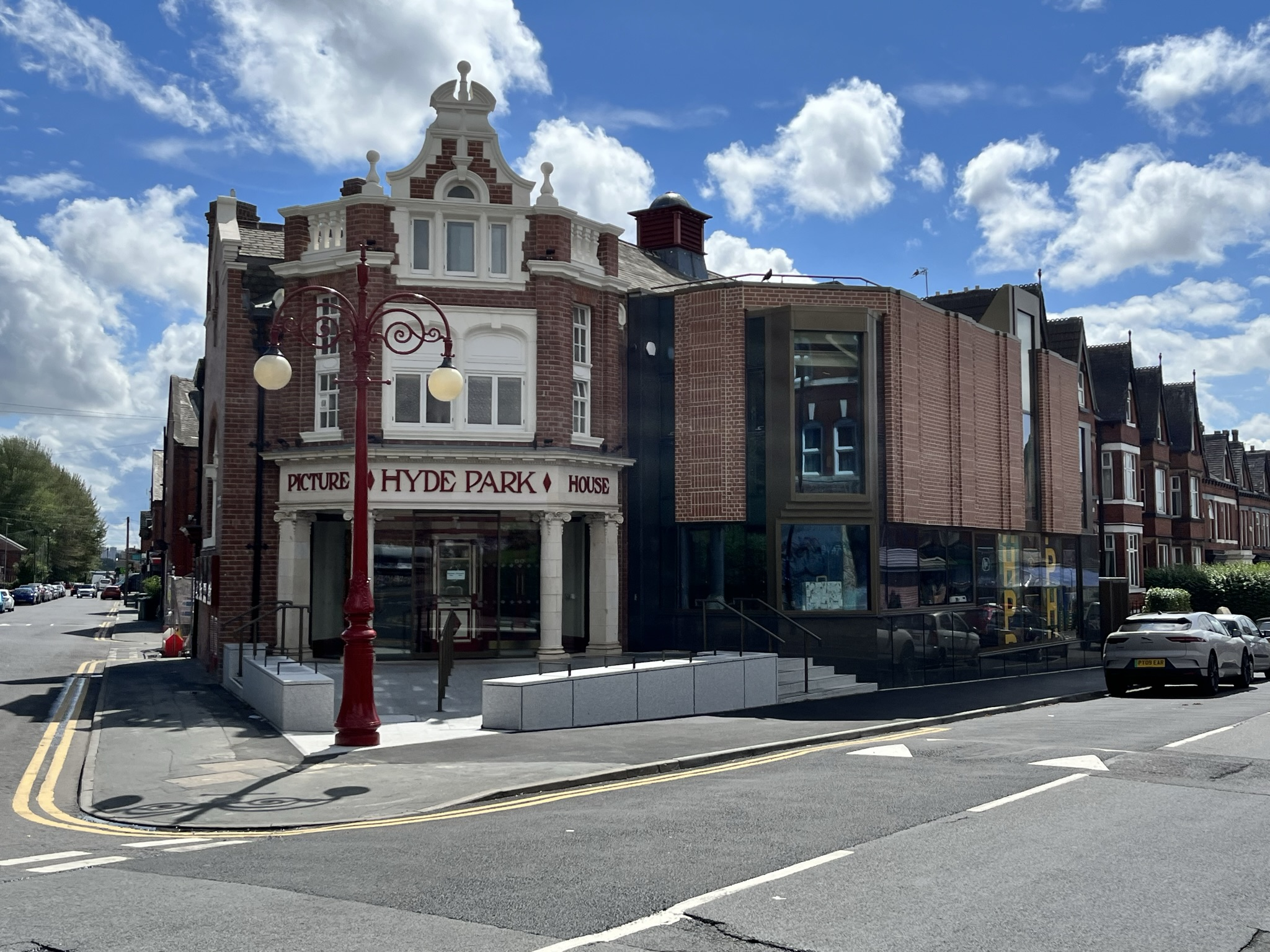
- The front entrance of the Hyde Park Picture House.
- Interactive map of Hyde Park Picture House
- Location: 73 Brudenell Road, Leeds, West Yorkshire, England
- Coordinates: 53.8122°N 1.5692°W
- Owner: Leeds Grand Theatre and Opera House Ltd.
- Capacity: 326
- Type: Cinema

Construction
- Opened: 7 November 1914; 30 June 2023 (Reopened following 2021-2023 renovation and expansion)
- Architects: Thomas Winn & Sons; Page\Park Architects (2021-2023 renovation and expansion)

Website
- hydeparkpicturehouse.co.uk

The Hyde Park Picture House is a cinema and Grade II listed building in the Hyde Park area of Leeds, West Yorkshire, England. Built by Thomas Winn & Sons, it opened on 7 November 1914. It features many original features, such as an ornate balcony and external box office, and is believed to be the only remaining gaslit cinema in the world. Following the installation of "comfier seating", the Picture House has a capacity of 275, down from around 587 on opening.

After being threatened with closure in 1989, the cinema was taken over by Leeds City Council, who created the Grand Theatre and Opera House Limited, an independent company within the council which looks after the Picture House along with the Grand Theatre and Opera House and the City Varieties. An initial National Lottery grant was awarded in 2016 to partly fund a restoration of the building, build a cafe, improve accessibility and add a second screen in the basement. Planning permission was approved in June 2018 and a £2.3 million National Lottery grant was awarded in January 2019 to pay for the project. Following delays due to the COVID-19 pandemic, work began in April 2021 with the cinema reopening on 30 June 2023.

A varied programme plays at the cinema, from arthouse movies to big new releases. This bill attracts a varied crowd of local residents and students. The Leeds International Film Festival began at the venue in 1987.

As well as showing movies, the cinema hosts occasional musical performances and has been used as both a backdrop for films and TV programmes and as a wedding venue.

== History ==
Hyde Park Picture House was designed by architects Thomas Winn & Sons in 1906. It was originally built for Leeds hotel businessman Henry Child, who owned The Mitre hotel in Leeds City Centre, however Leeds Corporation repeatedly rejected his application to transfer his license to his proposed new hotel, The Paragon, and the building was therefore modified to become Brudenell Road Social & Recreation Club, being converted to a cinema in 1913. (Note: Chrystal states that the building occupied by the Picture House was originally constructed in 1908 and operated as a hotel before being converted to a cinema in 1914. The Historic England listing claims that the building is "reputed to have been built as an hotel by Henry Child" and was occupied by the Brudenell Social Club in 1908.) It stands around halfway down Brudenell Road at the junction with Queen's Road, on a canted corner. The front elevation is topped by a Dutch gable with ball finials and features four ionic columns made from white Burmantofts Marmo. Glazed terracotta dressings and a frieze with moulded letters spelling out "Hyde Park Picture House" appear at the entrance and contrast with the red brick, which makes up the majority of the building.

The 587-seat cinema opened shortly after the start of World War I, on 7 November 1914. An advertisement in the Yorkshire Evening Post at the time of the opening, branded Hyde Park Picture House the "cosiest in Leeds". Their Only Son, billed as a "patriotic drama", was the first film shown at the venue, while other morale-boosting releases, such as An Englishman's Home, and newsreels delivering reports from the frontlines to families back home, made up the majority of the Picture House's programme during the Great War.

Following the advent of "talkies" in the 1920s, the cinema was converted for sound.

With a general decline in cinema audiences the cinema closed in the early 1950s then opened again. In 1959, to promote the showing of The Big Hunt, a live elephant appeared outside the cinema. At some point after this, the Picture House briefly closed and became a bingo hall before reopening as a cinema again in 1962, after refurbishment and installation of new projectors, with a programme successfully catering to the growing student population in the area.

In 1984, the private charitable company "Friends of Hyde Park Picture House" was set up to support the cinema and help preserve it as "an important part of our cinema and cultural heritage as well as ensuring it is maintained as an available public asset to the audiences of Hyde Park, Leeds, Yorkshire and the UK". Members of the Friends receive discounted admission to the cinema and funds from membership go towards supporting the charity's aims. Three years later, in 1987, the Leeds International Film Festival began at the venue.

When the Picture House was threatened with closure in 1989, Leeds City Council stepped in to save it, creating an independent company within the council, the Grand Theatre and Opera House Limited, to preserve the cinema alongside two other Leeds venues: the Grand Theatre and Opera House and the City Varieties.

The Picture House was given Grade II listed status on 11 September 1996. The ornate gas lamp outside the cinema was separately Grade-II listed on the same date.

== Present day ==
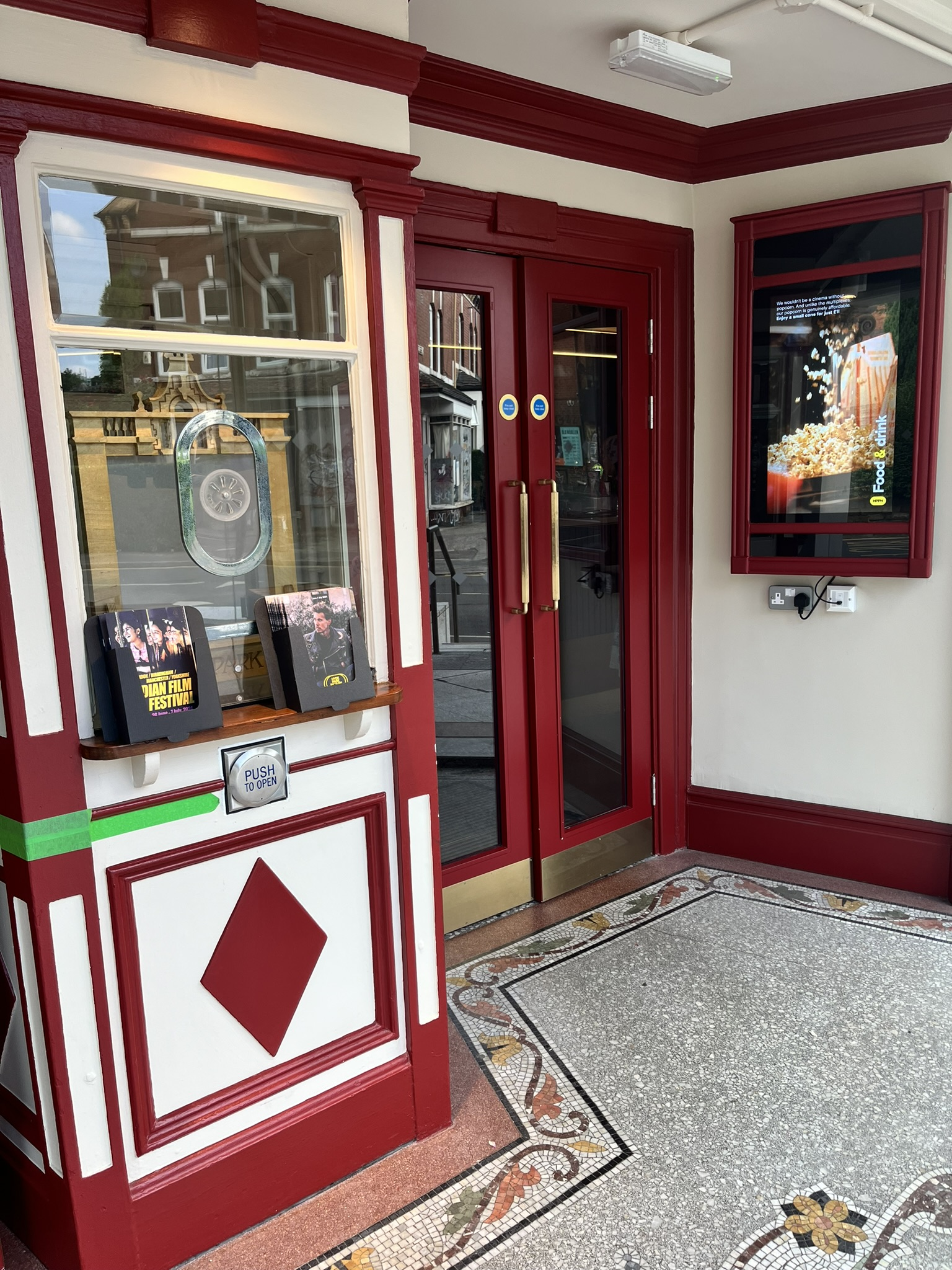
The Hyde Park Picture House retains its original external ticket booth and terrazzo foyer floor.

Prior to its expansion, the Hyde Park Picture House was one of only two surviving original single-screen cinemas in Leeds, along with the Cottage Road. This was down from peak numbers of between 60 and 70 in the 1930s. The Picture House retains many original features, including an external ticket booth, decorated barrel-vaulted ceiling and balcony adorned with a frieze of plaster festoons, brackets and shields. It is also the only cinema in the world to retain "modesty" gas lights, designed to avoid complete darkness in the auditorium. The original screen, painted directly on the wall and surrounded by golden cherubs, remains intact behind its modern successor.

The cinema has seen several changes since it opened in 1914, notably a reduction in the capacity of the auditorium from 587 on opening to 275, following the installation of "comfier" seating, with the present seats having been salvaged from the Lounge cinema in Headingley after its closure in 2005. The Cinemeccanica Victoria 8 projectors also came from the Lounge, while the clock to the right of the screen was taken from the former Gaumont cinema, which occupied the building now used by the O2 Academy Leeds. The fireplace, which originally sat in the hallway, has been replaced by a kiosk.

In 2016 the cinema was awarded an initial National Lottery grant of £122,000 to explore conservation work and an expansion of the venue. It was announced that the money would be used to restore the building, including the terrazzo foyer floor and gas lights; build a cafe/bar so that customers no longer have to queue outside; install disabled toilets and improve accessibility; add a second screen in the basement; and make the cinema's archives available to the public alongside educational workshops, tours and archival screenings. Planning permission for the project was approved in June 2018, and a further National Lottery grant of £2.3 million was confirmed in January 2019. The work, dubbed the Picture House Project, is costed at £3.6 million and, with additional funding from the Garfield Weston Foundation and Leeds City Council, was scheduled to begin at the end of February 2020. (Note: When additional National Lottery was confirmed in January 2019, work was slated to start in Autumn 2019.) The COVID-19 pandemic caused delays to the Picture House Project but, with a £285,600 Capital Kickstart Fund award from the National Lottery Heritage Fund and the UK government's Culture Recovery Fund, an announcement was made in February 2021 that work would commence in April of the same year. Over two years later, building work was completed, and the cinema reopened on 30 June 2023.

The Picture House plays an eclectic programme of films, from arthouse and independent movies to big new releases. Along with regular double bills and annual Christmas showings of It's a Wonderful Life, the cinema also hosts "Bring Your Own Baby (BYOB)" events, for children and their parents or carers, featuring lower volumes, subtitles and raised light levels. This mixed bill attracts a varied audience of local residents, graduates and students from the city's universities, and "not just Guardian readers".

Actors, such as Paddy Considine, Masanobu Ando and Adam Buxton, have been interviewed at the cinema and film critic Mark Kermode has hosted several question and answer sessions. Kermode is a "champion" of the Picture House, describing it in his book The Good, the Bad and the Multiplex, as "a beauty; a proper old-fashioned picture palace" with a clientele that are "enthusiastic, attentive and apparently more interested in films than in their mobile phones".

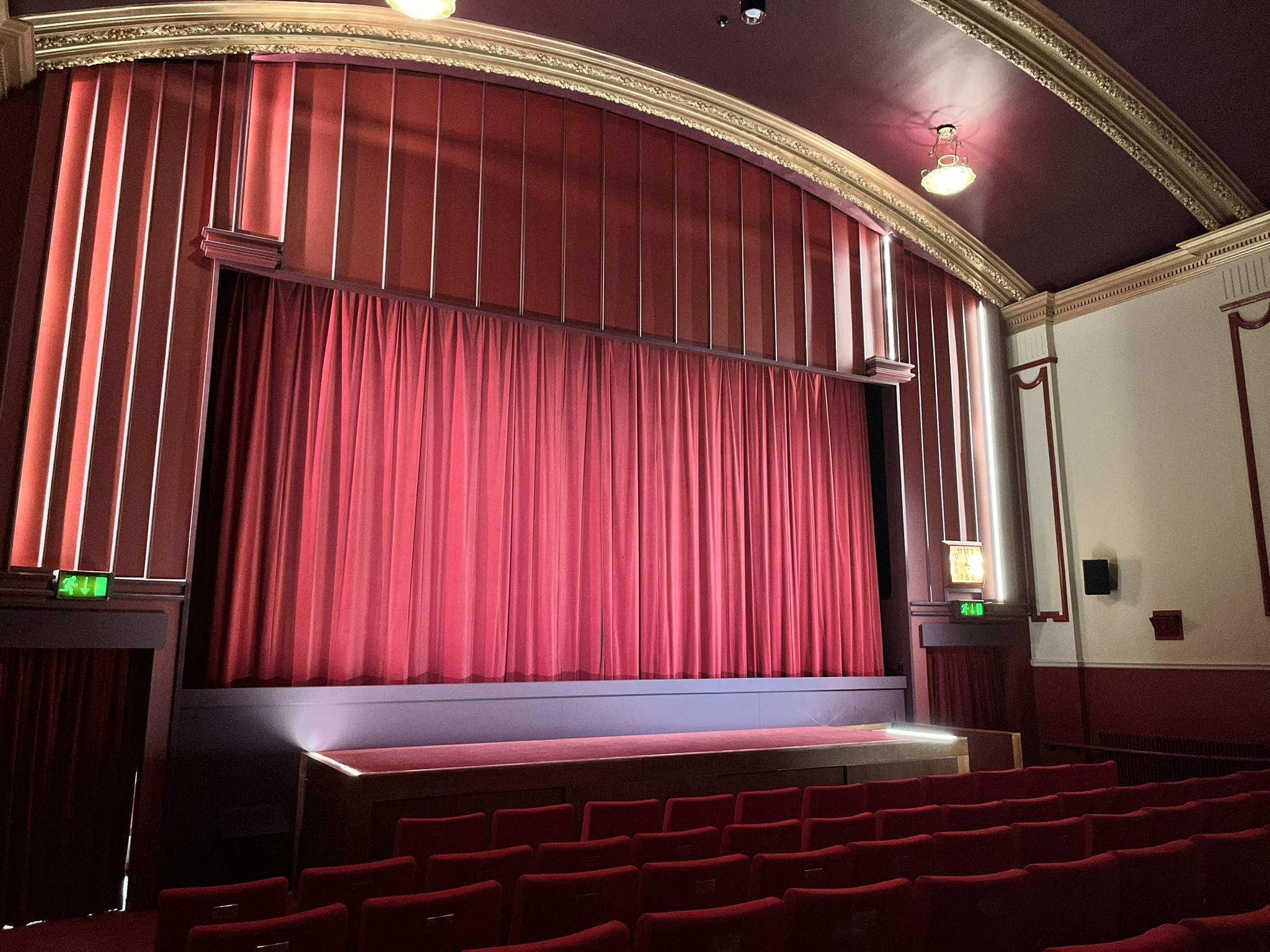
Main screen and surround

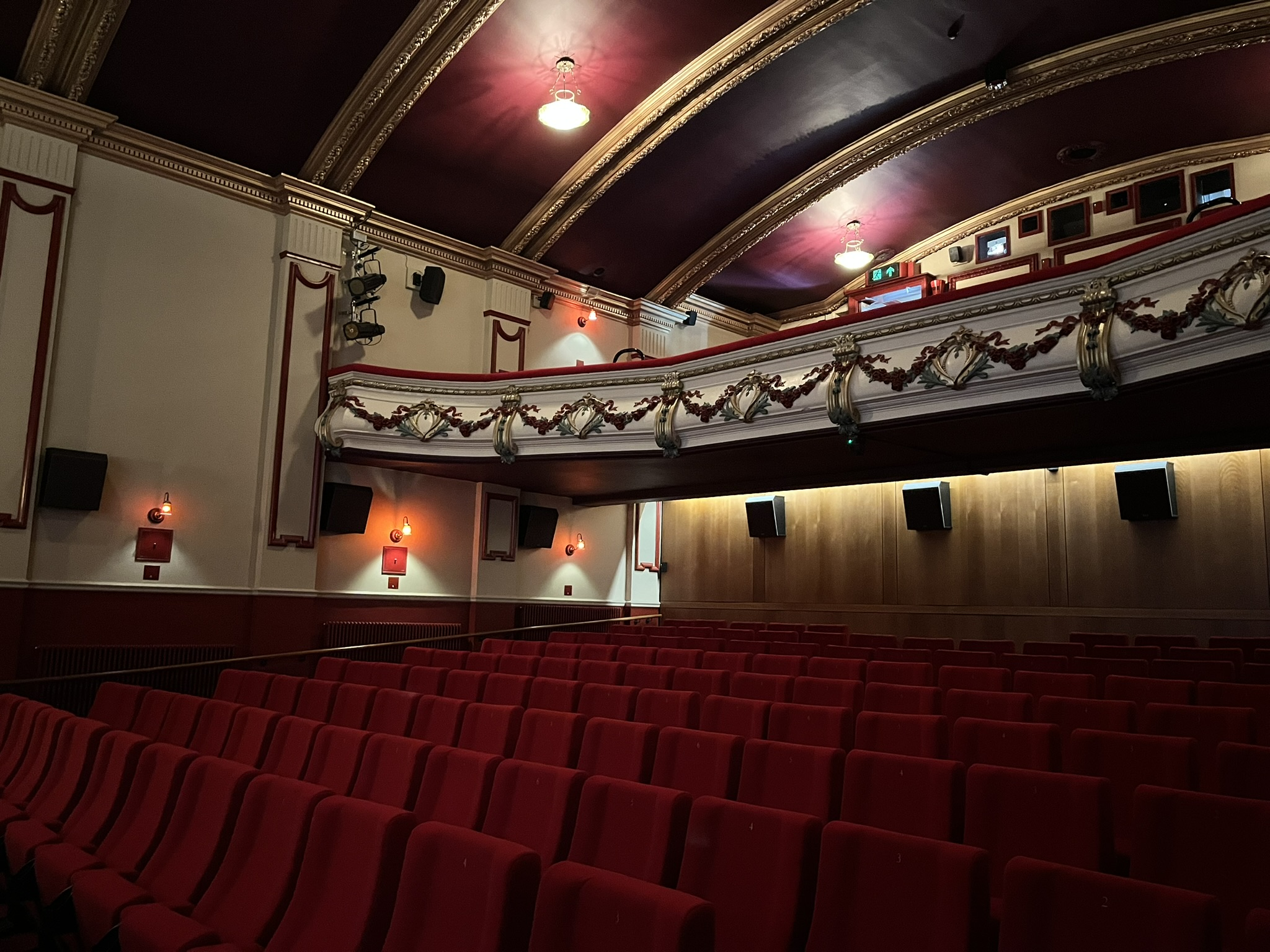
View from the front to the rear

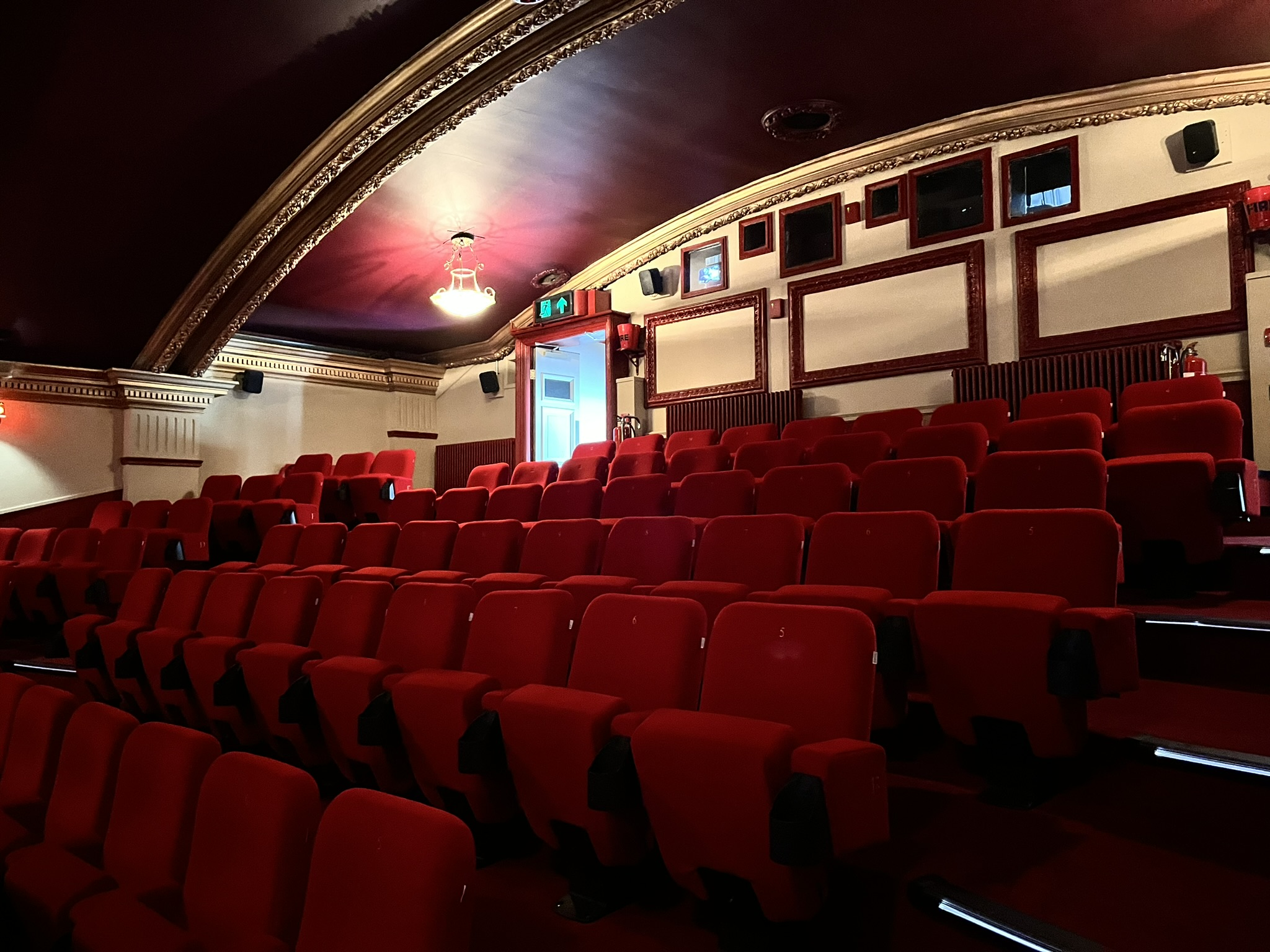
The balcony

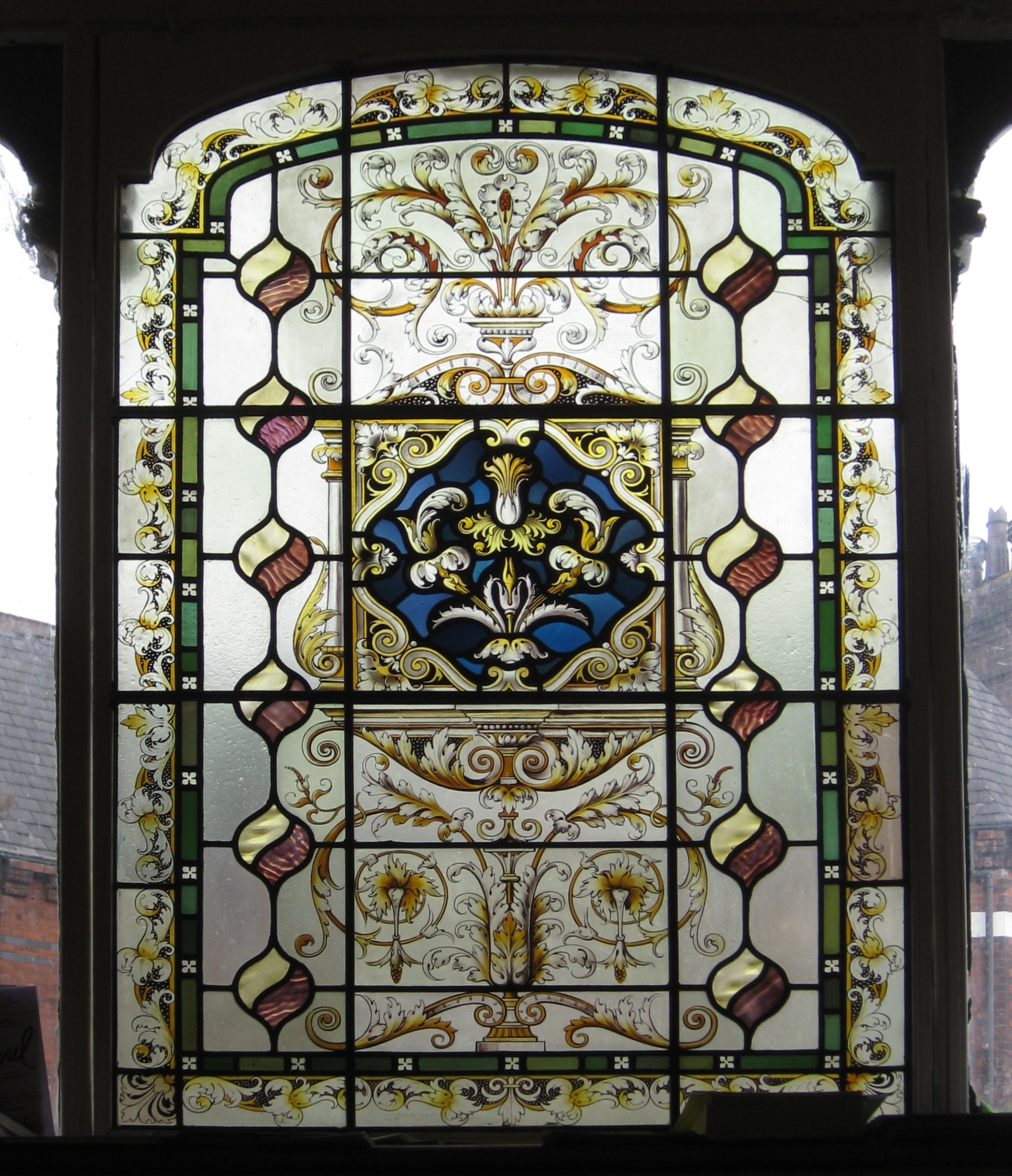
Stained glass window by the staircase

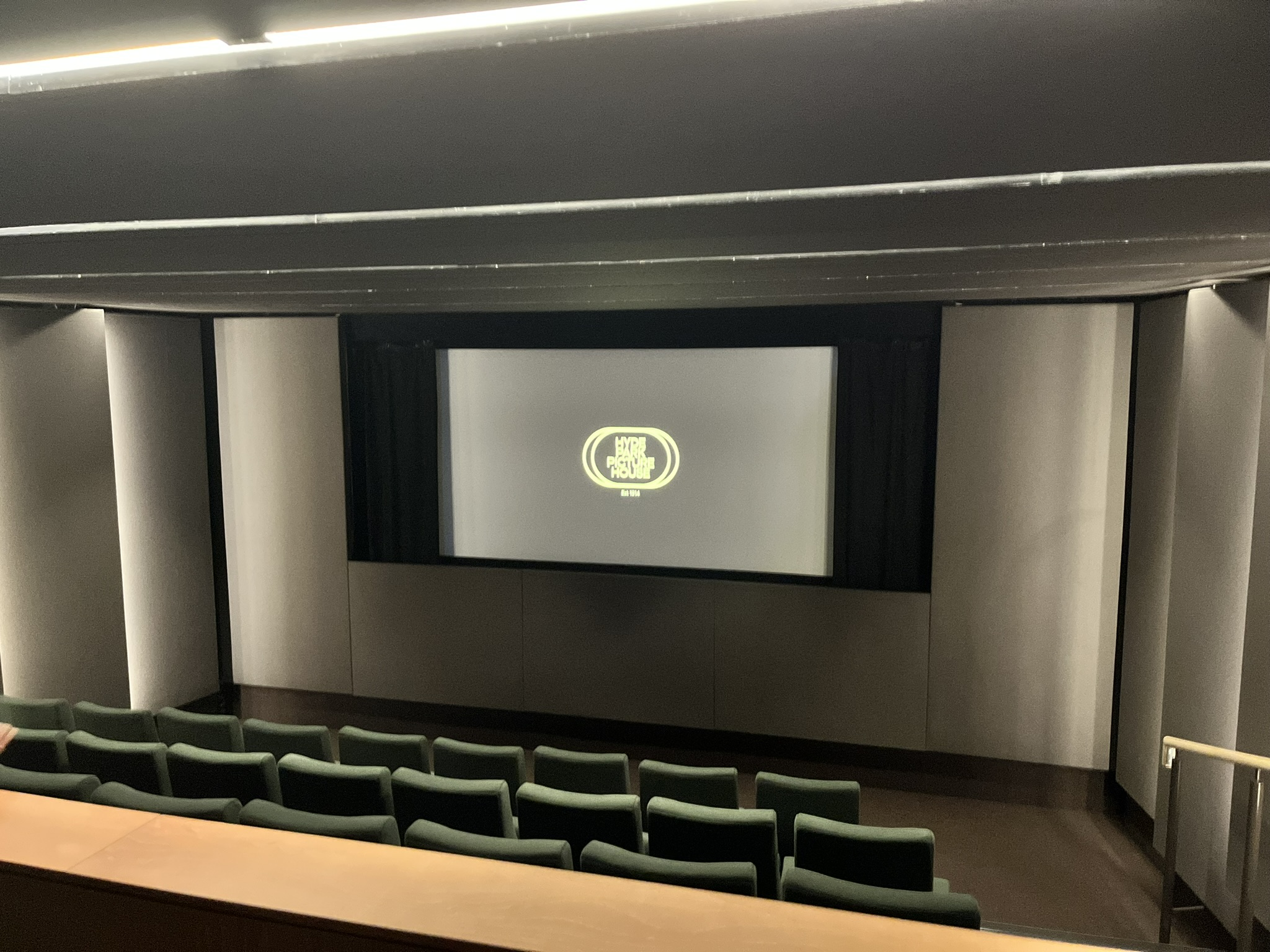
The second screen

== Other uses ==
The Hyde Park Picture House has been used as a backdrop in many films and TV programmes, including the feature-length TV drama A Is for Acid, the Vanessa Redgrave film Wetherby and the two-part BBC One TV film The Great Train Robbery. It has also been used as a wedding venue.

Occasional musical performances take place at the Picture House, with John Parish and Trembling Bells among those who have played.

== See also ==
- Architecture of Leeds
- Listed buildings in Leeds (Headingley Ward)

== Bibliography ==
- "Leeds International Film Festival". BBC Leeds. 5 October 2009. Archived from the original on 28 October 2016.
- "Hyde Park Picture House". BBC Leeds. 19 January 2010. Archived from the original on 18 April 2016.
- "Leeds' gas-lit Hyde Park Picture House receives Heritage Lottery Funding". BBC News. 12 August 2016. Archived from the original on 28 October 2016.
- "Hyde Park Picture House gets lottery funding for 'gas lights' revamp". BBC News. 10 January 2019. Archived from the original on 30 January 2019.
- Blow, John (10 January 2019). "Hyde Park Picture House wins £2.3m National Lottery grant to develop historic Leeds cinema". Yorkshire Evening Post. Archived from the original on 11 January 2019.
- Chrystal, Paul (2016). Leeds in 50 Buildings. Amberley Publishing. ISBN 978-1445654546.
- "History of the Friends". Friends of Hyde Park Picture House. 2016. Archived from the original on 28 October 2016.
- "The Hyde Park Picture House: The "Cosiest in Leeds"". Hyde Park Picture House. 2016. Archived from the original on 28 October 2016.
- "Events – Hyde Park Picture House". Hyde Park Picture House. 2016. Archived from the original on 28 October 2016.
- "Historic cinema redevelopment to begin this spring, following Capital Kickstart Fund award". Hyde Park Picture House. 2021. Archived from the original on 19 February 2021.
- Kermode, Mark (2012). The Good, the Bad and the Multiplex. Arrow Books. ISBN 978-0099543497.
- "Smuggler (Sumagurâ)" (PDF). 25th Leeds International Film Festival Free Guide. Leeds: Leeds Film. 2011. p. 49. "Star Masanobu Ando (Vertebrae) is set to attend the screening."
- "Leeds Grand Theatre". Leeds Grand Theatre and Opera House.
- McHale, Jamie (27 March 2012). "Cine-files: Hyde Park Picture House, Leeds". The Guardian. Archived from the original on 28 October 2016.
- Preedy, Robert (2005). Leeds Cinemas. Tempus. ISBN 0752435833.
- Robinson, John (7 August 2015). "Trembling Bells, On tour". The Guardian. Archived from the original on 28 October 2016.
- Ryan, Emma (15 January 2020). "Why is Hyde Park Picture House going on the road as £3m plus scheme is unveiled?". Yorkshire Evening Post. Archived from the original on 20 January 2020.
- Schofield, Claire (22 June 2018). "Planning approved for regeneration of UK's last gas-lit cinema". Yorkshire Evening Post. Archived from the original on 22 June 2018.
- Teal, Josh (31 October 2014). "The History of Leeds' Century-Old Hyde Park Picture House". Vice Media. Archived from the original on 2 January 2015.
- "Hyde Park Picture House". Time Out. 18 November 2014. Archived from the original on 11 October 2016.
- Tuffrey, Peter (2013). West Yorkshire Cinemas and Theatres. Fonthill. ISBN 9781781552063.
- Vinter, Robyn (26 June 2023). "Last surviving gaslit cinema in world to reopen in Leeds". The Guardian. Archived from the original on 26 June 2023.
- Wrathmell, Susan (2008). Leeds. Yale University Press. ISBN 9780300107364.
- Wright, Greg (15 March 2021). "New lease of life for Hyde Park Picture House in Leeds, one of Britain's oldest cinemas". Yorkshire Post. Archived from the original on 24 May 2022.
- "Proposed removal of the Mitre Hotel licence". Yorkshire Evening Post. 17 January 1906. p. 6.
- "The removal of the Mitre Hotel licence". Yorkshire Evening Post. 8 February 1906. p. 6.
- "Five things: Hyde Park Picture House". Yorkshire Evening Post. 28 June 2016. Archived from the original on 28 October 2016.
- "Gig preview: John Parish, Hyde Park Picture House, Leeds". Yorkshire Evening Post. 5 September 2013. Archived from the original on 28 October 2016.
- "Opening credits roll on new era for historic Leeds cinema as it wins £2.4m grant". Yorkshire Evening Post. 12 August 2016. Archived from the original on 11 October 2016.
- "The Big Interview: Paddy Considine". The Yorkshire Post. Leeds. 10 October 2011. "Not that Considine is ready to revel in the adulation coming his way just yet. He arrives for our interview at Leeds's Hyde Park Picture House in a car with blacked-out windows."
- "Raiders of the lost archive: Leeds cinema they lit by gas gets lottery bonanza". Yorkshire Post. 12 August 2016. Archived from the original on 28 October 2016.
