= Dispossession: The Great Social Housing Swindle =

- Directed by: Paul Sng
- Written by: Paul Sng
- Produced by: Paul Sng
- Starring: Maxine Peake (narrator)
- Music by: Mickey O’Brien
- Production company: Velvet Joy Productions
- Release date: 2017
- Running time: 82 minutes
- Country: United Kingdom
- Language: English
- Budget: £60,000

Dispossession: The Great Social Housing Swindle is a feature documentary, narrated by Maxine Peake, exploring the failures and deception that have caused a chronic shortage of social housing in Britain.

The documentary focuses on the neglect, demolition and regeneration of council estates in London, Glasgow and Nottingham, and examines the human cost of the housing crisis via interviews with residents, politicians and housing experts in the building industry and media.

== Content ==
The film focuses on the long term effects of the Right to Buy policy implemented by the United Kingdom Government in the 1980s. It is argued that the selling of publicly owned housing to its tenants, and the subsequent policy of renewal, has led to gentrification and a form of social cleansing. This has resulted in the disintegration of communities, and local authorities being unable to provide adequate housing for those in need.

The film includes interviews with social geographer Danny Dorling and working class academic Lisa Mckenzie. There are also interviews with journalists Peter Hitchens, Dawn Foster and Deborah Orr; as well as prominent politicians Nicola Sturgeon; Caroline Lucas and other Members of Parliament with an interest in the issue.

Areas featured include Gorbals and Govanhill in Glasgow where the council has transferred its stock to a housing association; as well as two estates in London being faced with demolition: Cressingham Gardens and the Aylesbury Estate.

Original Soundtrack written and performed by Mickey O'Brien who was also an associate producer.

== See also ==
- Sleaford Mods: Invisible Britain
