= The Wooden Carpet =

- Directed by: Abdolrahman Mirani
- Produced by: Honasraye Ghanoon Ins.
- Cinematography: Abdolrahman Mirani
- Edited by: Hayedeh Daysi
- Release date: 2008
- Running time: 18:15
- Country: Iran
- Language: Kurdish

The Wooden Carpet or Farseh Chob (Persian: فرش چوب) is a 2008 Iran documentary film by Iranian Kurd director Abdolrahman Mirani, and co-produced by Honasra Qanun Institute.

== Synopsis ==
The film is set in a village in the Kermanshah region, on the Iran-Iraq border. This territory, at the foot of Mounts Zagros at about 1,400 metres altitude, is very poor and isolated. A flood has destroyed the only bridge so communications with the village are cut. This event mobilised the whole community, which started to work tirelessly to reconstruct the bridge. The documentary film narrates, step by step, every small effort made by all the inhabitants of the village, whether they are men, women, children or the elderly. The final result is, in its naturalness and spontaneity, really amazing: a long bridge made from trunks and branches finely intertwined, as if it were a decorated carpet suspended between the two banks.

== Awards ==
- Won – François Ode Award (International Short Film Festival in Hamburg), 2009
- Won – Bansko Town prize (Bansko Mountain Film Festival Awards), 2008
- Won - Paras International Documentary Short (Leeds International Film Festival), 2009
- International Film Festival in Ankara in 2008
- International Film Festival in Leeds (England), 2009
- International Short Film Festival in Tehran in 2009
- International Mountain Film Festival in Trento, 2009
- International Film Festival in Uppsala (Sweden), 2009
- Festival “Black International Cinema” in Berlin in 2009
