= See No Evil: The Moors Murders =

2006 British made-for-television docudrama film

- DVD cover
- Genre: Crime drama
- Written by: Neil McKay
- Directed by: Christopher Menaul
- Starring: Sean Harris; Maxine Peake; Joanne Froggatt; Matthew McNulty; George Costigan; Charlotte Emmerson; John Henshaw
- Theme music composer: John Lunn
- Country of origin: United Kingdom
- Original language: English
- No. of series: 1
- No. of episodes: 2

Production
- Executive producers: Andy Harries; Jeff Pope
- Producers: Lisa Gilchrist; Paul Munn
- Cinematography: Lukas Strebel
- Editor: St. John O'Rourke
- Running time: 90 minutes (per episode)
- Production company: ITV Productions

Original release
- Network: ITV
- Release: 14 May – 15 May 2006

See No Evil: The Moors Murders is a two-part British television serial, directed by Christopher Menaul, produced by Granada Television and broadcast on ITV on 14 and 15 May 2006 starring Sean Harris, Maxine Peake, and Joanne Froggatt.

== Synopsis ==
The serial tells the story of the Moors murders, which were committed, between July 1963 and October 1965, by Myra Hindley and Ian Brady. The narrative is from the viewpoint of Hindley's sister, Maureen Smith, and her husband David.

== Cast ==
- Sean Harris as Ian Brady
- Maxine Peake as Myra Hindley
- Joanne Froggatt as Maureen Smith
- Matthew McNulty as David Smith
- George Costigan as DCI Joe Mounsey
- Charlotte Emmerson as WDC Pat Clayton
- John Henshaw as DCS Arthur Benfield
- Susan Twist as Nellie Hindley
- Steve Evets as Jack Smith
- James Quinn as Supt. Bob Talbot
- Gordon Brown as DS Jack Carr
- Stephen MacKenna as DCS Prescott
- Connor McIntyre as DCS Dougie Nimmo

== Episodes ==
No.	Title	Directed by	Written by	Original release date	U.K. viewers (millions)
1	"Episode One"	Nick Mckay	Christopher Menaul	14 May 2006	6.52
Around the autumn of 1964, married teenagers David and Maureen Smith, who live in the Gorton district of Manchester, have just become parents to their first child - a baby girl called Angela. Tragedy strikes when Angela dies of cot-death at the age of six months, and Maureen turns to her older sister, Myra Hindley, for comfort, while David finds friendship in Myra's boyfriend, Ian Brady. David and Maureen know nothing of the secrets harboured by Brady and Hindley. By Christmas 1964, Hindley and Brady have moved with Hindley's grandmother Ellen Maybury, to a new council house: 16 Wardle Brook Avenue, on the Hattersley estate near Hyde, Cheshire. David and Maureen follow them to Hattersley soon after, their new home being a flat in a tower block called Underwood Court. In the meantime, local police are seen discussing the possible fate of several missing local children and teenagers. 16-year-old Pauline Reade disappeared without a trace from Gorton in July 1963, with the police suspecting that she had run off with a boyfriend without informing her family. Pauline Reade was a neighbour of Myra Hindley and her family in Gorton, but since her disappearance most of the local residents have been rehoused to other districts of Manchester and neighbouring towns, in order to allow for the demolition of the Victorian slums. 12-year-old John Kilbride had disappeared from nearby Ashton-under-Lyne in November 1963, and in June 1964 another 12-year-old - Keith Bennett - went missing from Longsight, a district in the south of the city. Despite months of searching, both disappearances remain a mystery without a clue being found. At least one police officer believes that the two disappearances are linked, but his theory is rubbished by a colleague. Keith Bennett's step-father is questioned several times, but his disappearance remains a mystery. John Kilbride's father faces accusations from members of the public that he murdered his own son, but the police do not believe that this is the case, and have no evidence to lead them to a suspect or a solution to their case. On Boxing Day 1964, 10-year-old Lesley Ann Downey disappears after visiting a fairground near her home in Ancoats. It is not long before local police are speculating that her disappearance is linked to the earlier cases, while in the meantime her step-father is treated as a suspect and taken in for questioning more than once, but once again the disappearance remains a mystery. Soon after moving to Hattersley, David and Maureen discover that they are having another baby. They are also faced with the threat of eviction from their new council flat for rent arrears, and David turns to Ian Brady for a solution. They plan a bank robbery, but on 6 October 1965 Brady and Hindley lure a teenager back to their house, with Brady pledging to rob him. David Smith witnesses Brady killing the stranger with an axe in the lounge of their house; the victim is a 17-year-old, Edward Evans, an apprentice electrician from Ardwick. After the murder, and fearing for his own life, David helps clean up the mess and stays at the house until the early hours of the morning. When he returns home and tells Maureen about the crime, she finds his story hard to believe - particularly the claim that Myra was actively involved. In the morning, however, the couple go to the police, and Brady is swiftly arrested. Brady admits to the murder of Evans but insists that Smith was a willing accomplice. There is no evidence to implicate Hindley, so she walks free from the police station, despite David Smith's claims that she had helped lure Edward Evans back to the house to be murdered at Brady's hands. The police also allow Smith to walk free, despite Brady and Hindley both claiming that Smith was involved in the murder. Nellie Hindley warns her younger daughter that she will disown her if she supports her husband rather than her sister over the conflicting versions of events. Meanwhile, police have found John Kilbride's name written in one of Ian Brady's notebooks, with one officer beginning to wonder if Brady is responsible for the disappearance and potential murder of John Kilbride, although senior officers dismiss this suggestion.
2	"Episode Two"	Nick Mckay	Christopher Menaul	15 May 2006	6.22
Ian Brady is in custody following his arrest, and has already admitted murdering Edward Evans. However, Myra Hindley is still at liberty, as police begin a murder investigation. David Smith tells police that he recalls Brady's claims that he has committed murders in the past, and buried the bodies on nearby Saddleworth Moor - but had not named the victims or stated exactly when he had killed them. Brady and Hindley claim that David Smith was also involved in the murder, but police also doubt that Smith was actively involved in the murder and he too has walked free. David and Maureen Smith are both taken to the moors by two officers in the meantime, in their attempts to jog their memories in hope of locating potential graves of murder victims. Police then recover another notebook from Hindley and Brady’s house containing plans for the disposal of a body, and its content convinces them that Myra Hindley was actively involved in the murder of Edward Evans, and she is arrested on suspicion of murder. During questioning, she states that her version of events is exactly the same as the one which Brady has given. Brady, meanwhile, refuses to cave in and answer any questions about other murders, and urges interviewing officers to direct their questions at David Smith. In the meantime, the police search for bodies on Saddleworth Moor begins, and a suitcase believing to contain incriminating evidence is soon retrieved from a left luggage locker at a Manchester railway station. The suitcase contains numerous items, including photographs of Hindley and Brady on Saddleworth Moor. However, officers are even more horrified when they come across pornographic photographs of a young girl, believed to be Lesley Ann Downey. A reel-to-reel audio tape is also inside the suitcase, which plays out an audio recording of a young girl being sexually abused - the voices are identified as those of Brady and Hindley, and the girl is soon identified as Lesley Ann Downey. This evidence reduces a female officer to tears. Following this discovery, David and Maureen Smith are taken in by police for questioning, but the police soon determine that Smith did not take part in any murders. Maureen was totally unaware of any of the crimes, and was only aware of her husband's plan to rob a bank with Ian Brady shortly after the murder of Edward Evans. While questioning Brady and Hindley, the police read out the names of other missing children and teenagers who have recently vanished in and around Manchester. To most of the names, Brady and Hindley respond "Never heard of him/her", with the exception of one: Pauline Reade, who had been Hindley's neighbour in Gorton. Maureen Smith is also taken in for questioning after Brady and Hindley continue to insist that Smith was involved in the murder of Edward Evans, and was also present in the house when Lesley Ann Downey was being sexually abused. But they quickly realise that David and Maureen were not involved in the murders and were unaware of any of Brady and Hindley's crimes other than the murder of Edward Evans, and he and Maureen are free to return home. The police soon find the bodies of both Lesley Ann Downey and John Kilbride, buried in shallow graves on Saddleworth Moor. They had been led to the grave of John Kilbride by a photograph of Myra Hindley and her dog standing on recently disturbed ground on the moors, identifying the location with a reservoir in the background. Brady and Hindley are soon charged with the murders of Edward Evans, Lesley Ann Downey and John Kilbride, and remanded in custody to await trial the following spring. The police also suspect Brady and Hindley of murdering other missing children and teenagers - including Pauline Reade and Keith Bennett - but have not recovered any bodies or other evidence to charge the pair with any further crimes. On 21 April 1966, Brady and Hindley go on trial at Chester Assizes, where they are greeted by a crowd of vigilantes who taunt them and hammer the side of the van transporting them to court. David Smith is the main prosecution witness, and Maureen, pregnant again, agrees to testify. The defence lawyer attempts to portray David Smith as a murderer, while Brady and Hindley deny the charges against them. During the trial, Lesley Ann Downey's mother, Ann West, and stepfather, Alan, barge into David and Maureen's flat and attack them, believing that they were involved in their daughter's murder. David and Maureen's unborn child is unharmed, while Mr. and Mrs. West are cautioned by the police. Brady and Hindley are convicted of the murders of Edward Evans and Lesley Ann Downey two weeks later. Brady is also convicted of the murder of John Kilbride, and Hindley is found guilty for being an accessory to that murder. Brady is sentenced to three concurrent terms of life imprisonment, while Hindley receives two life sentences for murder and a seven-year sentence on the accessory charge. The birth of their second child soon after the trial does nothing to alleviate public hostility towards David and Maureen, who soon find "Hindley Bitch" painted on their front door and are frequently verbally abused by neighbours. They have a visit from a senior officer who worked on the case, thanking them for helping bring Brady and Hindley to justice, and urging them to get on with their lives now that the trial is over. By 1971, Maureen is living alone in a Manchester bedsit while David has served a prison sentence for wounding a man who provoked him in a pub with groundless claims that he had been involved in the Moors Murders. David and Maureen have had two more sons. Unable to cope with being a single parent, Maureen has placed her children into care. On his release, David is able to get his children back, and moves away from Hattersley. Having initially turned against Maureen for standing by David over Myra, Nellie tracks her younger daughter down and the two reconcile. Nellie convinces Maureen to visit Myra in Holloway Prison. Brady (who the trial judge felt had influenced Hindley into taking part in the killings) has been imprisoned elsewhere. [clarification needed] By now, having rediscovered her Roman Catholic faith, Myra, whose bleached blonde hair has now turned brown, tells Maureen a day does not go by where she does not think about the suffering she helped bring on the children and their families, or the trauma Maureen has been through because of her. Myra also explains that people are always making excuses for her behaviour, such as the beatings from her father when she was herself a child. But Maureen says he used to beat her too, and she didn't do what Myra did. Myra also says some people say Ian Brady corrupted her, and that she has decided to sever all contact with him. David is not pleased when he learns that Maureen has been to see Myra, but Maureen argues that Myra has changed, although David is not convinced by Maureen's claims that Myra was bullied and blackmailed into taking part in the murders by Ian Brady. David is also convinced that Brady and Hindley were responsible for the murder of Pauline Reade, whose disappearance is still a mystery nearly a decade after she was last seen alive. Maureen also mentions that Myra could soon be released from prison on parole. David and Maureen then turn their thoughts to their children and agree to patch up their differences for the children's sake. In the last scene, Maureen leaves the house. For a few moments, she stands on the doorstep, fighting back tears, and then she walks away from the house. Maureen is last seen walking down a street as the screen fades to black. An epilogue follows, revealing the fates of Maureen, David, Brady and Hindley. Maureen died in 1980, aged 34, after suffering a brain haemorrhage; David remarried and had a daughter with his second wife. Brady was imprisoned and later declared insane before being transferred to a psychiatric hospital. Hindley remained in prison until her death in prison from a heart attack in November 2002. By the time of her death, she was one of the longest serving prisoners in Britain. The epilogue also reveals that in 1986 Brady and Hindley confessed to the murders of Pauline Reade and Keith Bennett. They were taken to Saddleworth Moor separately to help locate the bodies. Reade's body was found and buried in a proper grave, but Bennett's body was not. The drama ends with a tribute to the young victims. Since then, David Smith and Ian Brady have both died. David Smith had moved to Ireland by the 1990s and died there in 2012. Ian Brady remained imprisoned for more than 50 years until his death in May 2017, having made it clear long before his death that he never wanted to be considered for parole, and having never appealed against legal decisions that he should not be paroled.

== Production ==
Writer Neil McKay based the story on the gathered research; which included interviews with detectives, relatives of the murdered children, and Hindley's brother-in-law David Smith. The only murder which featured was that of 17-year-old Edward Evans at Hindley and Brady's house in Hattersley. However, the investigation into the disappearance of the four other victims is mentioned on several occasions, particularly that of twelve-year-old John Kilbride.

The serial is the first dramatisation of the notorious murders and was produced to mark the 40th anniversary of Hindley and Brady's trial. It was made with the support of the victims' families, and was based on two years of research.

=== Greenlighting and filming ===
It was announced on 4 August 2005 by ITV Grenada, with the victim's families backing the serial.

On 8 October 2005, Maxine Peake was close to signing a deal to portray Hindley, when she was a regular on Shameless (British TV series). At this time, Brady had written to ITV Granada threatening legal action if the drama went ahead.

Filming took place between late October and mid-December 2005 around Greater Manchester. Specific places include Saddleworth Moor, Chester Crown Court, Wardle Brook Avenue in Rochdale, Hattersley, Ardwick and Gorton.

== Release ==
It was released by ITV Granada on 14 and 15 May 2006. The DVD on 7 July 2008, having received a pre-release in North America on 29 April. It was made available for streaming on Netflix, almost twenty years later in late March 2025.

=== Aftermath ===
Three years before the hint of a serial, Myra Hindley died at West Suffolk Hospital in Bury St Edmunds on 15 November 2002 following respiratory failure; she was 60 years old. Since the serial was released in May 2006, David Smith and Ian Brady have both died. David Smith died of cancer in Ireland on 30 June 2012 at the age of 64. Ian Brady died at Ashworth Hospital in Maghull on 15 May 2017 following a long illness; he was 79 years old and was Britain's longest-serving prisoner, having been imprisoned for more than 50 years.

== Critical reception ==
The miniseries received mostly positive reviews, such as Letterboxd's Mark Cunliffe praising the performances, saying that "both Maxine Peake and Sean Harris dominate proceedings with a deeply disturbing aura as Hindley and Brady, with Matthew McNulty and Joanne Froggatt equally convincing, grounded portrayals of the Smiths, and George Costigan offering light into the darkness as the dogged, honest DCI Joe Mounsey."

The production won the BAFTA TV Award for Best Drama Serial at the 2007 ceremony.
