= Grand Theatre, Leeds =

Theatre in Leeds, West Yorkshire, England

Coordinates: 53.8000°N 1.5408°W

Grand Theatre
- Frontage of the Grand Theatre
- Interactive map of Grand Theatre
- Address: 46 New Briggate; Leeds, LS1 6NZ; England
- Owner: Leeds Grand Theatre and Opera House Ltd; Registered charity 500408
- Capacity: 1,550
- Type: Visiting productions Home of Opera North
- Designation: Listed Grade II*

Construction
- Opened: 1878
- Architect: George Corson

Website
- www.leedsheritagetheatres.com

The Grand Theatre, also known as Leeds Grand Theatre and Leeds Grand Theatre and Opera House, is a theatre and opera house in Briggate, Leeds, West Yorkshire, England. It seats approximately 1,500 people.

== Building ==
It was designed by James Robinson Watson, chief assistant in the office of Leeds-based architect George Corson, and opened on 18 November 1878. It was built as a complex in three parts: the theatre, a set of six shops and Assembly Rooms, all facing onto New Briggate, in High Victorian style of red brick with stone dressings and a slate roof, the whole being a Grade II* listed building.

The exterior is in a mixture of Romanesque and Scottish baronial styles, and the interior has such Gothic motifs as fan-vaulting and clustered columns. The auditorium and assembly room ceilings are by John Wormald Appleyard.

== History ==
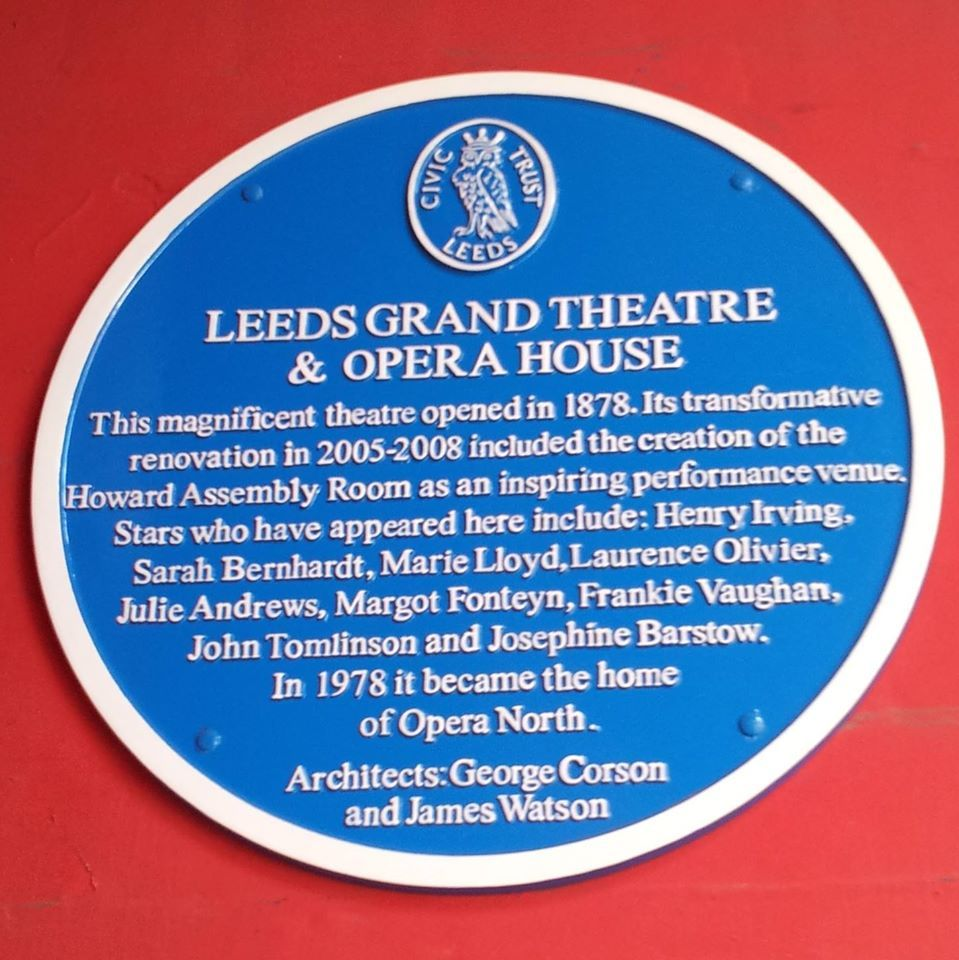
Leeds Grand Theatre Blue Plaque

The Assembly Rooms were modified to create a cinema, which opened in 1907 as the Assembly Rooms Cinema, the name being changed to Plaza in 1958. The cinema closed in 1985 and it became rehearsal rooms.

In 1970 it was bought by Leeds City Council and restored, becoming the home of Opera North in 1978.

Entrance of the Howard Assembly Room

For many years it was programmed by Howard & Wyndham Ltd and staged plays, musicals, pantomime and revues. The theatre closed at the end of May 2005 for a major refurbishment, transformation, and it reopened on 7 October 2006 with a production of Verdi's Rigoletto. The Stalls area was completely re-seated and re-raked, the orchestra-pit enlarged, technical facilities dramatically improved, and improvements to Opera North to the south of the theatre, accessible via a bridge and at street-level, which includes two new stage-sized rehearsal spaces and increased office space. The cost of the refurbishment has been estimated at £31.5 million.

A second phase of transformation included the restoration of the Assembly Rooms, making a second performance space, the Howard Assembly Room, which is used for recitals, concerts, chamber operas, experimental and educational work and other events for which the main theatre is unsuitable.

== Present use ==
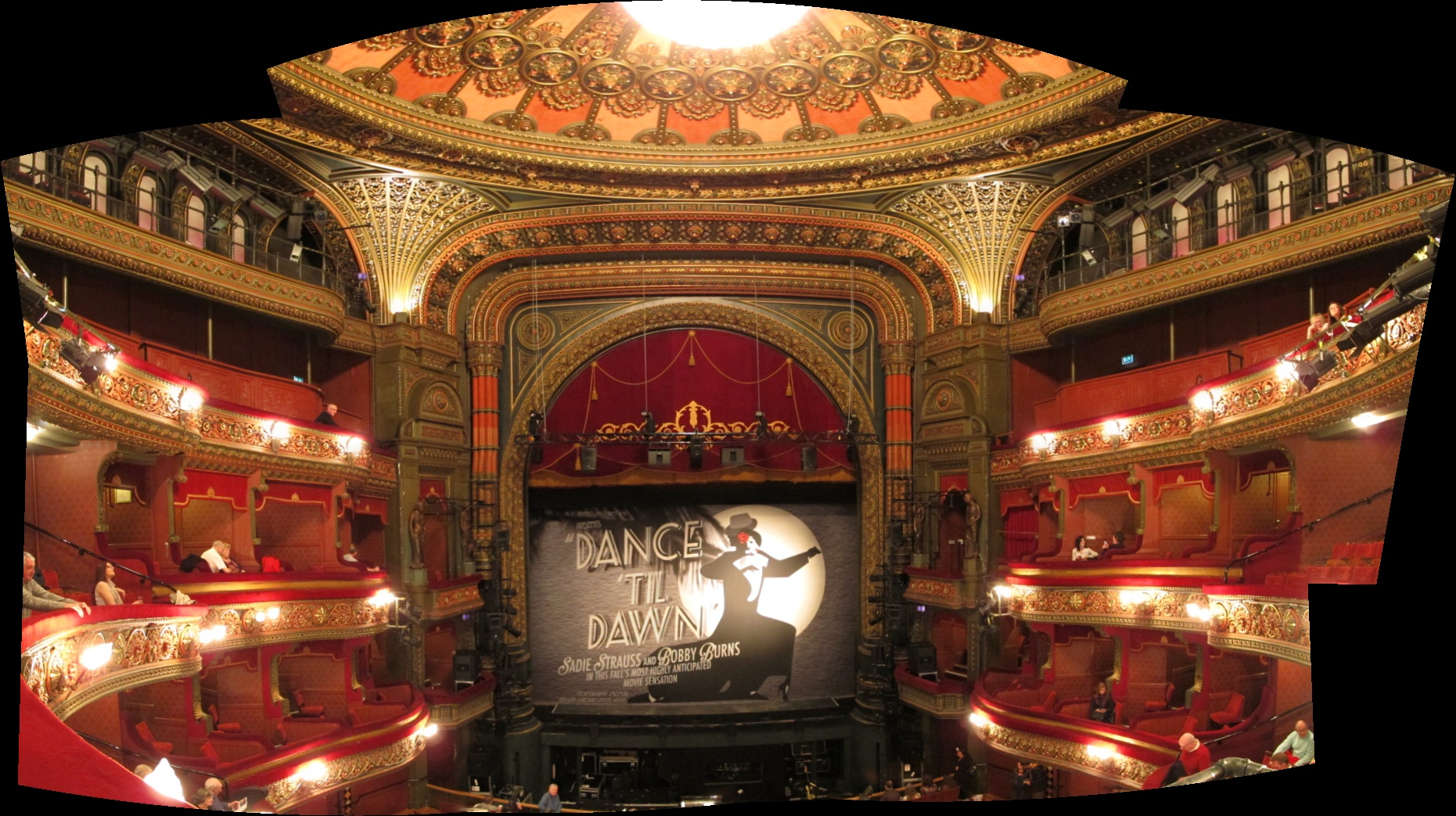
Interior

The theatre is a large scale receiving house and hosts touring productions of West End and Broadway musicals and plays, comedians and music. The theatre is home to Opera North and is regularly visited by Northern Ballet. It has hosted many touring productions, musical artists and comedians.

Since the "transformation" at the theatre, particularly after a state-of-the-art automated flying system was introduced, the theatre has been more able to host larger West End Musicals and plays.

Productions at the theatre have included: The Phantom Of The Opera, Dirty Dancing, Shrek The Musical, Oliver!, We Will Rock You and Wicked.

Leeds Grand Theatre hosted the world stage premier of Kay Mellor's Band Of Gold in November 2019.

The theatre is managed by Leeds Heritage Theatres which also manages City Varieties Music Hall and the Hyde Park Picture House. Leeds Heritage Theatres as a unifying brand was launched in August 2020.

The theatre was forced to close its doors during the coronavirus pandemic from March 2020 and reopened in June 2021 with Northern Ballet's Swan Lake and touring productions of Six (musical), Priscilla Queen of the Desert and Heathers (musical).

== See also ==
- Grade II* listed buildings in Leeds
- Listed buildings in Leeds (City and Hunslet Ward - northern area)
