= Maxine Peake =

British actress (born 1974)

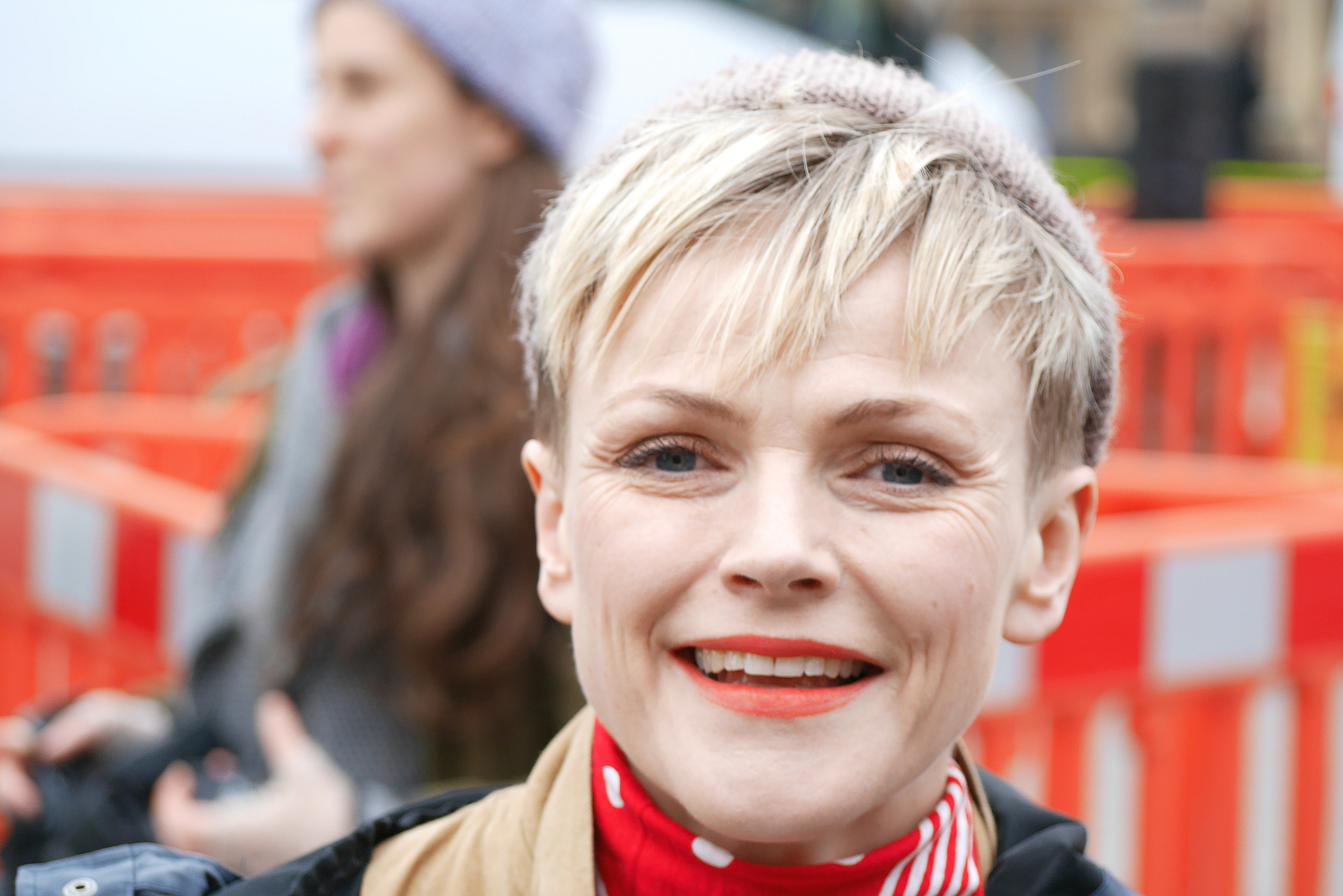
- Peake in February 2015
- Born: 14 July 1974 (age 52); Bolton, Greater Manchester, England
- Education: Royal Academy of Dramatic Art
- Occupations: Actress; narrator
- Years active: 1995–present
- Known for: dinnerladies; Shameless; Silk; The Village
- Partner: Pawlo Wintoniuk

Maxine Peake (born 14 July 1974) is an English actress and narrator. She is known for her roles as Twinkle in dinnerladies, a sitcom on BBC One (1998–2000), as Veronica Ball in Shameless, the comedy drama from Channel 4 (2004–2007), Martha Costello in the BBC One legal drama Silk (2011–2014), and Grace Middleton in the BBC One drama series The Village (2013–2014). In 2017, she starred in the Black Mirror episode "Metalhead". She has also played the title role in a Royal Exchange production of Hamlet, as well as the notorious serial killer Myra Hindley in See No Evil: The Moors Murders, the 2006 dramatisation by ITV of the Moors murders.

== Early life ==
Peake was born in Bolton, England, on 14 July 1974. She went to Westhoughton High School and Canon Slade School (in the same year as Sara Cox) in Bradshaw, acquiring two A-levels.

Peake joined the Octagon Youth Theatre in Bolton at the age of 13, before a period at the youth theatre of the Royal Exchange in Manchester. She later did a two-year performing arts course at the Salford College of Technology. During this time she appeared in productions with two leading amateur theatre companies in Bolton: The Marco Players and The Phoenix Theatre Company. Peake was a member of the Communist Party of Britain Salford branch in her youth. In her teens, Peake played for Wigan Ladies rugby league team.

Peake's early attempts to enter the acting profession were unsuccessful. She applied to multiple theatre schools but was rejected, until she obtained a place at the Royal Academy of Dramatic Art (RADA) at the age of 21. Her attempts to find sponsorship for her study at RADA were the subject of a 1996 documentary by The South Bank Show. Eventually, after being put forward by RADA, she was awarded the Patricia Rothermere Scholarship.

== Career ==
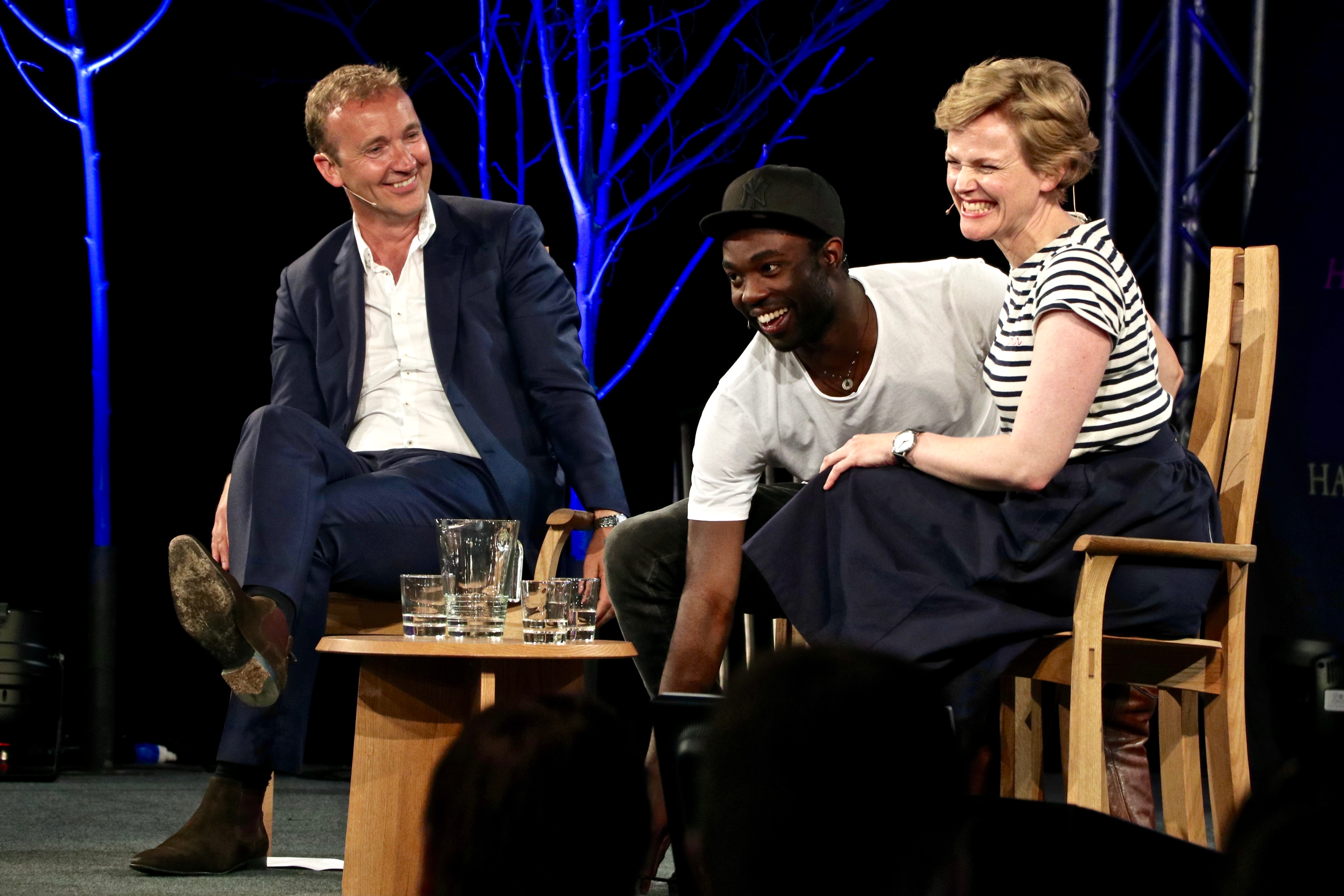
Peake (right) with Jerry Brotton and Paapa Essiedu at the 2016 Hay Festival

Peake has appeared in many television and stage productions, including Victoria Wood's dinnerladies, Channel 4's Shameless, in the lead role of barrister Martha Costello in the BBC's legal drama Silk and alongside John Simm in the BBC drama The Village, depicting life in a Derbyshire village during the First World War. Following career advice from Victoria Wood, between the two series of dinnerladies, Peake lost so much weight that an explanation had to be written into the script for her character, Twinkle.

Peake portrayed Moors murderer Myra Hindley in See No Evil: The Moors Murders, which was broadcast in May 2006. In January 2009, Peake appeared in her first major feature film role, as Angela, in the film Clubbed.

In 2012, Peake played the title role in Miss Julie at the Royal Exchange, Manchester, and previously played the part of Kristin in a 2000 production. She played Doll Tearsheet in the BBC2 adaptations of Henry IV, Parts I and II.

Peake wrote, directed and starred in the play Beryl: A Love Story On Two Wheels about the life of the Leeds-born cyclist Beryl Burton, which was broadcast on BBC Radio 4 in November 2012. In 2014, Peake adapted her play for the stage. Entitled simply Beryl, it was commissioned by the West Yorkshire Playhouse, where it ran in June and July 2014 to coincide with the start of the Tour de France in Leeds. The play returned in June and July 2015 and toured across England in Autumn 2015. Peake wrote a later play called Queens of the Coal Age again for Radio 4 that told the story of Anne Scargill and three other women who tried to occupy a coal mine in 1993.

Peake provided the vocals for the Eccentronic Research Council's 2012 concept album 1612 Underture about the Pendle witch trials and for their 2015 album Johnny Rocket, Narcissist & Music Machine…I'm Your Biggest Fan. Peake also features as a crazed stalker in the music video for "Sweet Saturn Mine" by The Moonlandingz; a collaborative effort by Eccentronic Research Council and Fat White Family in 2015.

In September 2013, Peake was appointed an Associate Artist of the Royal Exchange Theatre in Manchester. Her association with the theatre began in childhood and she was a member of the youth theatre. Major productions in which she has performed include The Children's Hour in 2008, for which she won a MEN Award, and Miss Julie in 2012 for which she won a Manchester Theatre Award. All of her performances at the Royal Exchange have been directed by Sarah Frankcom with whom she also collaborated on The Masque of Anarchy in 2012 for the Manchester International Festival. Building on this work, in September 2014 Frankcom went on to direct her as the title character in a radical re-imagining of Hamlet. The demand for tickets was so great that the production was extended for a week, having been "the theatre's fastest-selling show in a decade". The Guardian said of her performance: "Peake's delicate ferocity, her particular mixture of concentration and lightness, ensure that you want to follow her whenever she appears".

In 2015, Peake appeared in Frankcom's production of The Skriker, as "Caryl Churchill's shape-shifting, doom-wreaking fairy". The Guardian's Lyn Gardner listed the production in her top ten British plays of the year. In 2016, Peake resumed her partnership with Royal Exchange Artistic Director, Sarah Frankcom, to star as Blanche Dubois in Tennessee Williams' A Streetcar Named Desire. Peake's performance in the role garnered critical acclaim with The Guardian describing her performance as "exquisite" and "breathtaking".

Peake starred in "Metalhead", a December 2017 episode of Netflix's Black Mirror anthology. The episode was directed by Hannibal and American Gods director David Slade.

Peake starred as Nellie in Mike Leigh's 2018 film, Peterloo, based on the events of the 1819 Peterloo Massacre in Manchester.

Peake starred as the eponymous protagonist in the 2018 film Funny Cow alongside a cast including Paddy Considine and Stephen Graham. Tony Pitts wrote and starred in the film, which received positive reviews, in particular for Peake's "magnificent" performance.

Peake starred in, and won critical acclaim for, the lead role of Winnie in Samuel Beckett's Happy Days at the Royal Exchange Theatre in May 2018. The Guardian said she gave a "brilliant central performance, there's barely a breath between optimism and despair". Following Happy Days, the theatre presented Queens of the Coal Age, a play written by Peake. Adapted from her earlier radio drama, Queens of the Coal Age looks at the 1993 pit closure protests by miners' wives in northern England. The play received mixed reviews.

Peake starred in The Nico Project as the Velvet Underground singer Nico at the Manchester International Festival in July 2019.

Peake stars as Miss Fozzard in the 2020 BBC remake of Talking Heads, recreating a role originally played by Patricia Routledge.

In August 2026 it was announced that Peake would star with Kate Winslett in The Unheard.

== Personal life ==
Peake is in a relationship with art director Pawlo Wintoniuk. In 2009, Peake left London after living there for 13 years. She said that living in Salford with Wintoniuk gave her the freedom to choose riskier roles and lower-paying jobs in theatre.

== Political views ==
Peake is a feminist and socialist. She was active in communist organisations during her youth and a member of the Communist Party of Britain. In January 2014, Peake won the first Bolton Socialist Club Outstanding Contribution to Socialism Award for using her work to oppose the government's "crippling austerity measures".

In February 2011, Peake spoke against the "class snobbery" that she felt affected the entertainment business of the age.

In January 2016, Peake featured in The Climate Coalition's short film I Wish For You as Mia, with Jeremy Irons starring as her grandfather, to highlight the urgency of combating climate change.

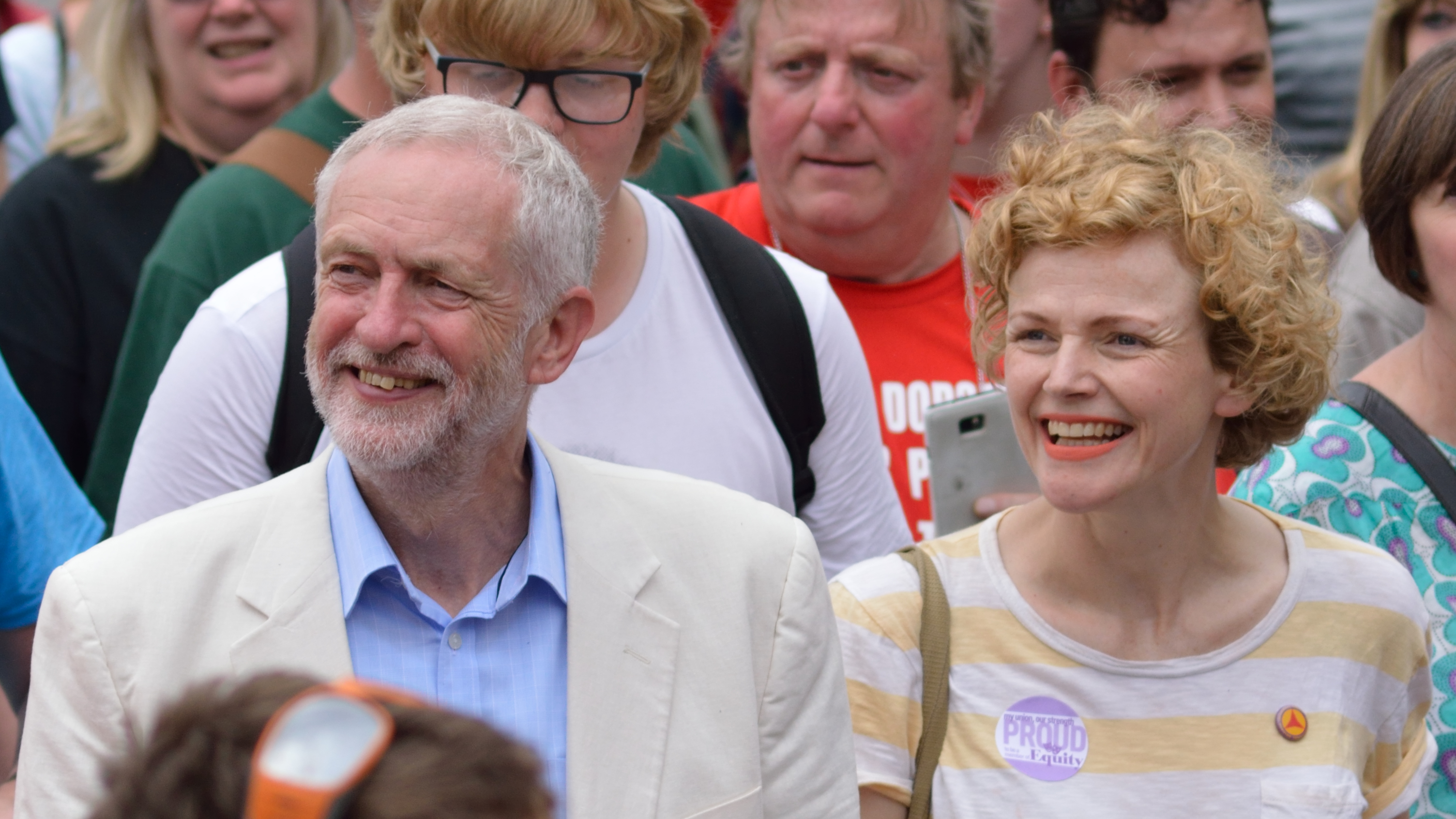
Jeremy Corbyn and Maxine Peake walking together in the procession through the village at the Tolpuddle Martyrs' Festival and Rally 2016

In July 2015, Peake endorsed Jeremy Corbyn's campaign in the Labour Party leadership election. She wrote on her website: "For me, Jeremy Corbyn is our only beacon of hope to get the Labour Party back on track, get the electorate back in touch with politics and save this country from the constant mindless bullying of the vulnerable and poor." In 2016, along with other celebrities, Peake toured the UK to support Corbyn's bid to become prime minister.

In April 2017, Peake endorsed Corbyn in the 2017 general election. She said: "I am a Corbyn supporter. My mind boggles why people treat him like the anti-Christ, but it goes to show people are a lot more right-wing than they like to believe." In November 2019, along with other public figures, Peake signed a letter supporting Corbyn, describing him as "a beacon of hope in the struggle against emergent far-right nationalism, xenophobia and racism in much of the democratic world", and endorsed him in the 2019 general election.

In June 2020, she took part in an interview with The Independent in which she stated that the practice of police officers in the United States kneeling on someone's neck, one example of which led to the murder of George Floyd in Minneapolis, was "learnt from seminars taught by Israeli secret services". The Independent amended the original article to add a note that "the allegation that US police were taught tactics of 'neck kneeling' by Israeli secret services is unfounded". Peake later stated that she was "inaccurate in [her] assumption of American police training and its sources". Peake's statement was denounced by Labour leader Keir Starmer, the Board of Deputies of British Jews and the Jewish Labour Movement as an "antisemitic conspiracy theory". Shadow Education Secretary Rebecca Long-Bailey retweeted the article and called Peake an "absolute diamond". When Jewish groups demanded she delete the tweet, Long-Bailey refused to do so, leading to her dismissal from the Shadow cabinet by Starmer. John McDonnell, the shadow chancellor under Corbyn, said that "criticism of practices of [the] Israeli state is not antisemitic" and that Peake's claim "was not antisemitic". In October 2023, she criticised Israel's military offensive in the Gaza Strip and called for a ceasefire.

== Acting credits ==
=== Film ===
Key
†	Denotes works that have not yet been released

Year	Title	Role	Notes
1998	Girls' Night	Sharon	
2002	All or Nothing	Party Girl	
2005	Be Mine	Tina's mother	Short
2005	Frozen	Ticket Attendant	
2005	Stealing Up	Daughter	Short
2006	The Madness of the Dance	The Professor	Short
2007	I Am Bob	Marilyn Monroe	Short
2007	Would Like to Meet	Heather	Short
2008	Clubbed	Angela	
2010	The Secret Diaries of Miss Anne Lister	Anne Lister	
2010	Alice	Gillian	Short
2010	Edge	Elly	
2011	Room at the Top	Alice Aisgill	
2011	Best Laid Plans	Isabel	
2012	Private Peaceful	Hazel Peaceful	
2013	Run & Jump	Vanetia Casey	
2013	Svengali	Angie	
2014	The Falling	Eileen	
2014	The Theory of Everything	Elaine Mason	
2014	Keeping Rosy	Charlotte	
2017	Dispossession: The Great Social Housing Swindle	Narrator	Documentary
2017	Funny Cow	Funny Cow	
2018	Fanny Lye Deliver'd	Fanny Lye	
2018	Peterloo	Nellie	
2018	Gwen	Elen	
2019	Be Still My Beating Heart		Short film
2019	Judy	Judy	Short film
2020	It's Me	Miriam	Short film
2020	The Way Back	Alyssa, the Sat Nav	Short film
2022	Lapushka!	Scoot Piccolo	Short film
2022	Wendell & Wild	Irmgard Klaxon (voice)	
2023	Tish	Tish Murtha (voice)	
2023	Dance First	Barbara Bray	
2024	Woken	Helen	
2025	Words of War	Anna Politkovskaya	
2025	I Swear	Dottie Achenbach	

=== Television ===
Year	Title	Role	Notes
1995	Children's Ward	Geraldine	5 episodes
1996	Hetty Wainthropp Investigates	Photocopy Assistant	Episode: "Fingers"
1998	Picking Up the Pieces	Lucy	Series 1: Episode 7
1998–2000	dinnerladies	Twinkle	All 16 episodes
1999	Sunburn	Sue	Series 1: Episode 5
1999	Coronation Street	Belinda Peach	Episode #1.4635
1999	Jonathan Creek	Marion Cretiss	Episode: "The Curious Tale of Mr. Spearfish"
2000	Clocking Off	Marie Leach	Episode: "The Leaches' Story"
2001	The Way We Live Now	Ruby Ruggles	TV mini-series; all 4 episodes
2001	Linda Green	Receptionist	Episode: "Fitness Freak"
2002	Holby City	Tanya Wilton	Episode: "Pawns in the Game: Part 1"
2002	Dalziel and Pascoe	Dr. Allison Laurie	Episode: "Mens Sana"
2002	Hamilton Mattress	Lulu (voice)	TV short
2003	At Home with the Braithwaites	Trixie Fletcher	Series 4: Episode 3
2003	Early Doors	Janice	4 episodes
2004	Christmas Lights	Pauline	Television film
2004–2007	Shameless	Veronica Ball	Series regular (series 1–3), guest (series 4); 26 episodes
2005	Faith	Linda	Television film
2005	Messiah IV: The Harrowing	DS Vickie Clarke	TV mini-series; all 3 episodes
2006	See No Evil: The Moors Murders	Myra Hindley	Television film
2007	Confessions of a Diary Secretary	Tracey Temple	Television film
2008	Fairy Tales	Cindy Mellor	Episode: "Cinderella"
2008	Bike Squad	WPC Kate McFay	Television film
2008	Hancock and Joan	Joan Le Mesurier	Television film
2008	Placebo	Dr. Sian Nuttall	Television film
2008	The Devil's Whore	Elizabeth Lilburne	4 episodes
2008	Little Dorrit	Miss Wade	7 episodes
2009	Red Riding: In the Year of Our Lord 1980	Helen Marshall	Television film
2009	Agatha Christie's Marple – They Do It with Mirrors	Jolly Bellever	Television film
2009	The Street	Madeleine	Episode: "Past Life"
2009	Criminal Justice	Juliet Miller	5 episodes
2010	The Secret Diaries of Miss Anne Lister	Anne Lister	Television film
2011–2014	Silk	Martha Costello	All 18 episodes
2012	Henry IV, Parts I and II	Doll Tearsheet	TV dramas, part of the series The Hollow Crown
2013–2014	The Village	Grace Middleton	All 12 episodes
2015	Call Security	Narrator	Documentary
2016	Comic Strip – Red Top	Rebekah Brooks	Television film
2016	A Midsummer Night's Dream	Titania	Television film
2017	Three Girls	Sara Rowbotham	3 episodes
2017	Black Mirror	Bella	Episode: "Metalhead"
2018	The Bisexual	Sadie	All 6 episodes
2020	Inside No. 9	Nadia	Episode: "Thinking Out Loud"
2020	Talking Heads	Miss Fozzard	Episode: "Miss Fozzard Finds Her Feet"
2020	Mandy	Susan Blower	Episode: "Susan Bloody Blower"
2022	Anne	Anne Williams	TV mini-series; all 4 episodes
2022	Rules of the Game	Sam Thompson	TV mini-series; all 4 episodes
2022	Kelvin's Big Farming Adventure	Narrator	Six-part television series
2023	Star Wars: Visions	Kalina Kalfus (voice)	Episode: "I Am Your Mother"
2024	Say Nothing	Dolours Price	7 episodes
2025	The Haunted Season	The Englishwoman (voice)	Episode: The Occupant of the Room
2026	Bait	Helen	2 episodes
2026	Last Seen	Jenna Reid	6 episodes
TBA	Berlin Noir †	Mila Gilhausen	Upcoming series
TBA	First Day on Earth †	Helen	Filming

=== Music videos ===
Year	Title	Artist	Role	Notes
2019	"The Dazzler"	Ex:Re	Actor	Lead actor, portrays a nameless woman spending the night at The Dazzler

=== Theatre ===
Year	Title	Role	Notes	References
1998	Early One Morning	Lizzie		
2000	Miss Julie	Kristin		
2000	The John Ford Investigation	Various		
2000	The Importance of Being Earnest	Gwendoline		
2000	The Cherry Orchard	Dunyasha		
2001	The Relapse	Miss Hoyden		
2001	Luther	Katherine Von Bora		
2002	Mother Theresa Is Dead	Jane		
2002	Hamlet	Ophelia		
2003	Serjeant Musgrave's Dance	Annie		
2003	Robin Hood	Maid Marian		
2003	The Permanent Way	Various	Not in the final cast	
2005	Rutherford and Son	Janet		
2006	On the Third Day	Claire		
2007	Leaves of Glass	Debbie		
2008	The Children's Hour	Karen Wright		
2011	Loyalty	Laura		
2011	The Deep Blue Sea	Hester Collyer		
2012	Miss Julie	Miss Julie		
2013	The Masque of Anarchy	Performer		
2014	Beryl		Writer	
2014	Hamlet	Hamlet		
2015	How to Hold Your Breath	Dana		
2015	The Skriker	The Skriker		
2016	A Streetcar Named Desire	Blanche DuBois		
2018	Happy Days	Winnie		
2019	Avalanche: A Love Story	Julia		
2019	The Nico Project	Nico		
2020	The Welkin	Lizzie Luke		
2020	The Great Mountain Sheep Gather	Narrator		
2022–2023	Betty! A Sort of Musical	Meredith Ankle and Betty Boothroyd	Co-writer and actor	
2025	The Last Stand of Mrs Mary Whitehouse	Mary Whitehouse		

=== Radio drama ===
- Much Ado About Nothing (2005), Beatrice
- Guilty Until Proved Innocent (2009), Dina
- Geoffrey Chaucer – Troilus and Criseyde (2009), Criseyde (dramatised by Lavinia Greenlaw)
- This Repulsive Woman (2010), Deborah Hurst
- Craven (Series 1: 2009, Series 2, 3 & 4: 2012, Series 5: 2013, Series 6: 2014), Detective Sue Craven
- Beryl: A Love Story on Two Wheels (2012), writer and performer (Beryl Burton)
- Queens of the Coal Age (2013) writer and performer (Anne Scargill)
- My Dad Keith (2014), writer and performer (Steph)
- Betsie Coleman (2015), performer (Betsie Coleman)
- Briar Road (2015), narrator (writer Jonathan Buckley)
- Not in Our Name CD (2015), narrator (writer Heathcote Williams)
- Only Mountains, BBC Radio Drama on 3 (writer) 8 March 2020

==== Radio (other) ====
- Only Artists (2018), meets the musician and performance artist Cosey Fanni Tutti.

== Awards and nominations ==
Year	Nominated work	Association/Awards	Category	Result
2006	See No Evil: The Moors Murders	Royal Television Society – North	Best Actress	Won
2009	Hancock & Joan	BAFTA TV Awards	Best Actress	Nominated
2010	The Street	Broadcasting Press Guild Awards	Best Actress	Won
2010	Criminal Justice	Broadcasting Press Guild Awards	Best Actress	Won
2010	Criminal Justice	Crime Thriller Awards	Best Actress	Nominated
2013	Silk	Broadcasting Press Guild Awards	Best Actress	Nominated
2013	Silk	Crime Thriller Awards	Best Actress	Nominated
2013	Room at the Top	Broadcasting Press Guild Awards	Best Actress	Nominated
2014	Keeping Rosy	Fantasporto Awards	Best Actress	Won
2014	The Village	BAFTA TV Awards	Best Actress	Nominated
2014	The Village	Broadcasting Press Guild Awards	Best Actress	Nominated
2018	Three Girls	Broadcasting Press Guild Awards	Best Actress	Nominated
2018		UK Theatre Awards	Outstanding contribution to British Theatre	Won
2018	Funny Cow	British Independent Film Awards	Best Actress	Nominated
2025	Say Nothing	BAFTA TV Awards	Best Supporting Actress	Nominated
2025	I Swear	British Independent Film Awards	Best Supporting Performance	Nominated
