= A Is for Acid =

British television film

- DVD Cover
- Genre: True crime
- Written by: Glenn Chandler
- Directed by: Harry Bradbeer
- Starring: Martin Clunes; Keeley Hawes; Richard Hope; Celia Imrie
- Country of origin: United Kingdom
- Original language: English

Production
- Running time: 120 minutes
- Production company: Yorkshire Television

Original release
- Network: ITV
- Release: 9 September 2002

A Is for Acid is a 2002 British television film based on the life of the serial killer John Haigh, known as the Acid Bath Murderer because he dissolved the bodies of six people in sulphuric acid. Haigh, hanged in 1949 for his crimes, had wrongly believed that murder could not be proven without the presence of a body. Starring Martin Clunes in the lead role, the film was shot in Scarborough, chosen because its appearance was believed to be similar to that of London when Haigh lived there during the 1940s, and also Saltaire to represent his early life. The film was produced by Yorkshire Television for the ITV network and aired on 9 September 2002. Directed by Harry Bradbeer and written by Glenn Chandler, A Is for Acid also featured among its cast Keeley Hawes, Richard Hope and Celia Imrie.

== Plot ==
John George Haigh is raised in a Yorkshire village by sheltering parents who fellowship with the strict Plymouth Brethren. His father teaches him that their family is different from others, being among "God's elect"; but as an adult John turns to petty crime. He marries Beatrice 'Betty' Hamer, who becomes pregnant with his child. While serving a prison sentence for fraud, Haigh reads about the term corpus delicti, wrongly assuming it means murder cannot be proven without the presence of a body. He subsequently dreams up what he believes to be the perfect murder and experiments by dissolving mice in sulphuric acid. After learning that Betty gave birth to a daughter and moved away, Haigh travels to London upon his release, where he finds employment as an engineer.

After being fired from his job because of a relationship with his boss's daughter, Gillian Rogers, Haigh sets himself up as an inventor. He bumps into a former employer, Donald McSwan, who has a successful property business. Befriending McSwan and his elderly parents, William and Amy, Haigh offers to help them when Donald is conscripted to fight in the Second World War. Donald agrees to Haigh's suggestion that he run the business and take care of his parents while Donald hides out in Scotland for the duration of the war. Haigh then invites Donald to his workshop where he bludgeons his friend to death and places his body in a vat of acid to dissolve, then forges Donald's signature to take control of his affairs. He keeps up the pretense that Donald is on the run through the rest of the war, but as Britain celebrates VE Day, Haigh tells William and Amy that Donald has returned to London and is waiting for them at his workshop. He then kills them both after individually driving them there. With the McSwans' money, Haigh sets himself up at the Onslow Court Hotel in Kensington.

Haigh's next victims are Archie and Rose Henderson, a doctor and his wife, whom he befriends after visiting a shop they have recently purchased. Dr. Henderson discloses to Haigh that he and Rose are quite wealthy, but their marriage is in difficulty. The couple embark on a make-or-break holiday which is interrupted by Haigh, who invites Archie to his workshop and kills him there. He later lures Rose to the same premises under the pretense that her husband is ill. Rose's brother Arnold Burton is suspicious when Haigh tells them the Hendersons had to leave the country because Archie performed an illegal abortion, and signed over their affairs to Haigh, someone they have only known for a few months. Finally, Haigh kills Olive Durand-Deacon, a fellow Onslow Court resident, when his funds begin to run low. Her friend, Constance Lane, becomes concerned about Olive's disappearance and persuades Haigh to accompany her to the police to report Olive missing.

Burton also goes to the police after seeing Haigh's picture in a newspaper article about the missing woman, prompting detectives to launch an investigation. Haigh confesses to killing Olive, saying he dissolved her in acid and therefore cannot be prosecuted for her murder, there being no body. He goes on to confess to the other five murders, and claims another three killings. A Home Office pathologist is called in to examine Haigh's workshop where gallstones and a pelvic bone are recovered. After being convicted of murder, Haigh awaits a death sentence. He is visited by Gillian Rogers, and asks her to visit his parents after he has been hanged. The film ends with Gillian honouring that promise.

== Cast ==
- Martin Clunes as John Haigh
- Keeley Hawes as Gillian Rogers
- Richard Hope as Dr. Archie Henderson
- Celia Imrie as Rose Henderson
- Rowena Cooper as Olive Durand-Deacon
- John Flanagan as Arnold Burton
- Terence Beesley as Detective Sergeant Heslin
- Matyelok Gibbs as Constance Lane
- Geoff Holman as John Haigh Sr.
- Barbara Marten as Emily Haigh
- Sally Carman as Betty Haigh (née Hamer)
- Neil McKinven as Donald McSwan
- Claire Nielson as Amy McSwan
- Donald Douglas as William McSwan
- Christopher Ettridge as Steven Rogers
- Christopher Town as John Haigh (as a boy)
- Charlotte Webb as Dead Woman's legs

== Background ==
The Scarborough News reported in November 2001 Yorkshire Television was working on a production titled A Is for Acid that would portray the life of the serial killer John George Haigh, and that Martin Clunes had been cast in the starring role. Scenes for the forthcoming production would be filmed in locations around Scarborough, particularly the town's South Cliff area, which was believed to resemble Kensington as it had looked during the time Haigh lived there in the 1940s. The article also reported that Yorkshire Television had asked the Scarborough Council for permission to close some roads and the town's Esplanade for filming purposes, but that permission had been refused, so residents were being asked to avoid the area on a voluntary basis. Additional scenes were filmed in Wetherby, Saltaire and outside Hyde Park Picture House, Leeds.

The Manchester Evening News carried an interview with Clunes on 9 September 2002, the day the film was aired, in which the actor spoke about the role: "I've never been asked to play someone who actually existed before. Haigh was a real challenge. Although he was real he's almost forgotten and my generation didn't really know about him. My mum, on the other hand, can remember the case as a truly horrific event of the last century. When I told an older friend of mine who I was playing, he said he was often told as a child: 'You eat that up or John Haigh will get you.' He was the stock bogeyman of the day."

== Reception ==
The film was heavily promoted by ITV before its first broadcast at 9:00pm on 9 September 2002, but attracted a relatively small audience for a peak time programme. Overnight figures suggested 6 million viewers had tuned in to watch A Is for Acid, a figure beaten by an episode of Waking the Dead which appeared in the same time slot on BBC One. A review in the Manchester Evening News the day after the film was shown was generally favourable: "Clunes might seem an unlikely choice for this sinister and demanding role ... but he acquitted tremendously in his portrayal of the beaming, oily trickster with a murderous heart ... Clunes made the killer plausible, disarming and businesslike as he went about murdering for profit." However, the reviewer was critical of the film's lack of tension and its failure to analyse Haigh's psyche.

== Filming ==
The opening scene depicting Haigh's childhood was filmed in Saltaire, West Yorkshire. Later where John is shown courting Betty, the Hyde Park Picture House in Hyde Park, Leeds. The police station to which John takes Constance Lane to report her friend missing, was filmed at Wetherby Council Offices.
