= Cottage Road Cinema =

Cinema in Headingley, Leeds, England

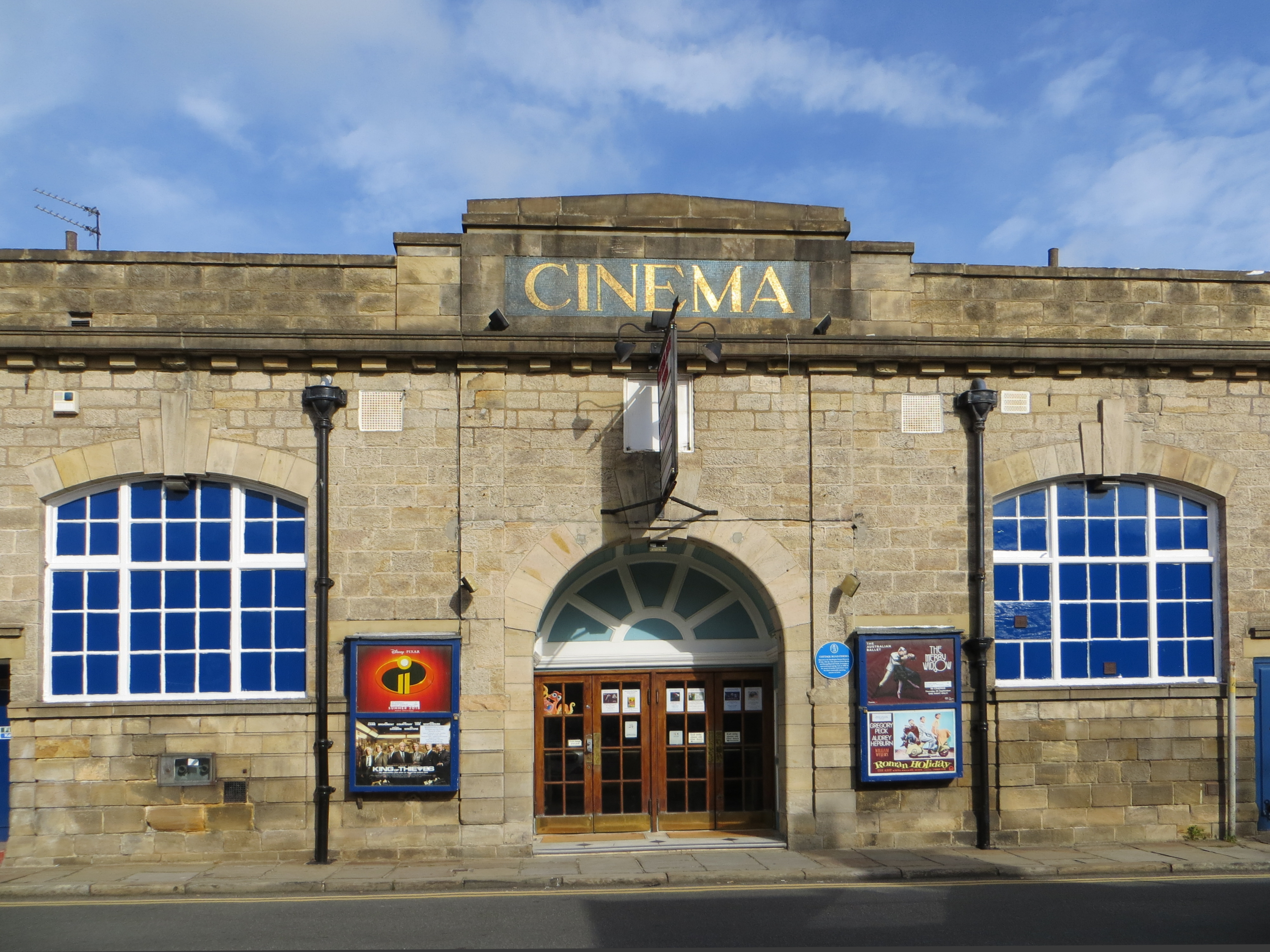
- The front entrance of Cottage Road Cinema
- Interactive map of Cottage Road Cinema
- Location: Cottage Road, Headingley, Leeds, West Yorkshire, England
- Coordinates: 53.826944°N 1.581389°W
- Owner: Northern Morris Group
- Capacity: 466
- Type: Cinema

Construction
- Opened: 29 July 1912

Website
- www.cottageroad.co.uk

Cottage Road Cinema is the oldest remaining cinema in continuous use in Leeds, West Yorkshire, England. Situated in the suburb of Headingley, Cottage Road was originally built in 1905 as a garage for the nearby Castle Grove mansion. Local newsreel cameraman Owen Brooks leased the garage with his friend George Reginald 'Reg' Smith and the two converted the building into a cinema, which opened as 'Headingley Picture House' on Monday, 29 July 1912. The cinema changed hands in the late 1930s, ultimately being purchased by Associated Tower Cinemas, who changed its name to Cottage Road Cinema and undertook building work.

Associated Tower invested £20,000 to modernise the cinema in 1972, but announced that Cottage Road would close on 28 July 2005, due to unsustainable financial losses. The cinema was saved by a last minute bid from Charles Morris's Northern Morris Group. Under Northern Morris's ownership, Cottage Road celebrated its 100th birthday on 29 July 2012, with a Leeds Civic Trust blue plaque being unveiled by screenwriter Kay Mellor. Aiming to provide "cinema-going as it used to be", Cottage Road shows a mix of family-friendly films alongside classic movies, with ice creams being sold in the auditorium during the interval before films begin, and the national anthem being played at the end of each evening.

== History ==
Cottage Road Cinema was originally built in 1905 (on the site of a former stable block) as a garage for H.R. Kirk, a Leeds textile merchant and owner of the nearby Castle Grove mansion. Pioneering Leeds-born newsreel cameraman Owen Brooks rented the garage several years later and, in partnership with his friend and fellow motoring enthusiast George Reginald 'Reg' Smith, converted it into a cinema. This 590-seat cinema opened as 'Headingley Picture House' on Monday, 29 July 1912, with tickets costing sixpence, or one shilling for reserved seating. Smith died in 1922, after which Brooks and Smith's widow, along with a new partner, bought the freehold of the property from the Kirk family. Two years later Brooks left the business and, following a one-week closure in 1931 to install sound equipment at the end of the silent film era, (Note: Sheena Hastings' Yorkshire Post article about the 100th anniversary of Cottage Road claims this one-week period in 1931 is the only time the cinema has closed, but Tuffrey notes a reopening of the cinema following renovations in 1972.) Headingley Picture House was purchased in 1937 by entrepreneur Frank T. Thompson. The cinema changed hands again the following year, with Associated Tower Cinemas taking over ownership and renaming it 'Cottage Road Cinema'. Associated Tower added a balcony to the auditorium and, around this time, the building was also re-fronted. Cottage Road continued to show films through the 'talkies' boom of the 1930s and 40s and the advent of colour until a major renovation in 1972, when £20,000 was spent modernising the cinema. The cinema re-opened on Boxing Day 1972 with a screening of Diamonds Are Forever. Further improvements were made in 1982 when Cinemeccanica Victoria 8 projectors, taken from the Grove cinema in Smethwick, were installed.

By 2005 Cottage Road's fortunes had waned and Associated Tower, who disposed of Headingley's other historic cinema, The Lounge, in January of that year, announced that the venue would close on 28 July, one day shy of its 93rd birthday. In statements to the BBC, Associated Tower variously claimed that the cinema was losing £100,000 a year and between £1,000 and £2,000 a month due to "competition from multiplexes" and that it was no longer viable as a business. Despite protests from local residents, staff were issued with redundancy notices and Cottage Road was set to close its doors as planned until a last minute buyout was agreed with Charles Morris's Northern Morris Group, who paid a “nominal fee” to secure an initial nine-year lease. Morris claimed that he "couldn't resist" attempting to save the cinema given that it had "survived when so many other cinemas had succumbed to bingo halls and supermarkets due to competition from television, video and other entertainment", but warned that the local community would need to attend showings regularly to ensure Cottage Road's continued survival.

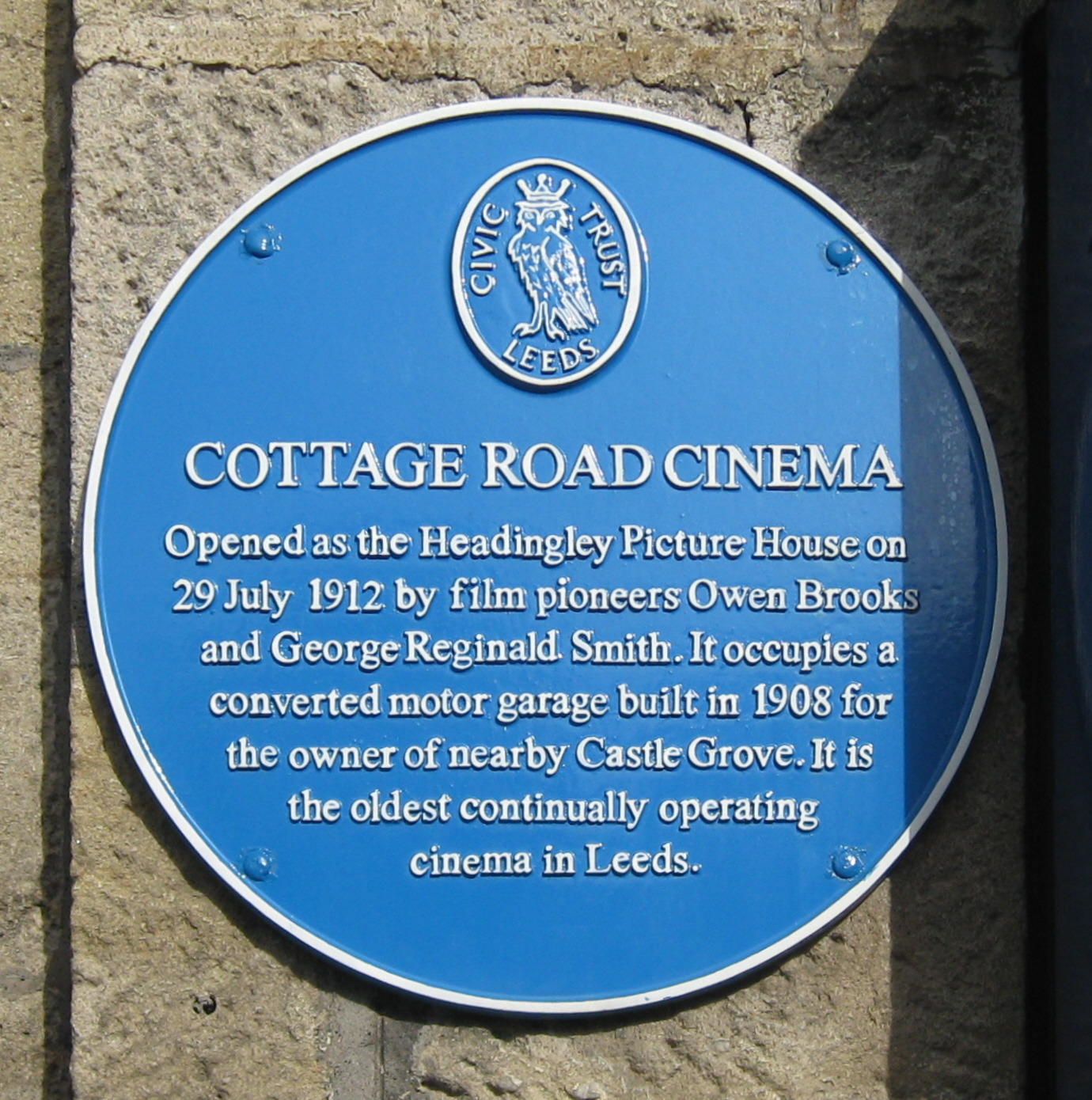
Cottage Road Cinema's blue plaque

Cottage Road regained its alcohol licence under Northern Morris ownership and, a year on from its acquisition, Charles Morris told the Yorkshire Evening Post that he was happy with sales at the cinema, stating that "it's doing particularly well really as it's been a bad year for cinemas generally" and pointing to a sold-out showing of the 2006 James Bond film Casino Royale as a highlight. In 2008 the cinema received a National Lottery grant from the UK Film Council for roof repairs and, on 29 July 2012, a Leeds Civic Trust blue plaque was unveiled by Leeds-born screenwriter Kay Mellor to commemorate its 100th anniversary. Local poet Linda Marshall gave a special tribute entitled "Havoc In Far Headingley" after the plaque was unveiled, before the 1957 comedy The Smallest Show on Earth was shown. 100th birthday celebrations continued with more classic films, including a screening of Singin' in the Rain introduced by Labour MP Gerald Kaufman, and culminated with a silent film showing with live musical accompaniment, in conjunction with the Leeds International Film Festival. Leeds North West MP Greg Mulholland tabled an early day motion in the House of Commons, calling on his fellow politicians to congratulate "Leeds' oldest cinema in continuous use [...] as it celebrates the centenary of its founding" along with Charles Morris and the Northern Morris Group for their role in saving Cottage Road and "similar historic cinemas up and down the country".

The COVID-19 pandemic caused the cinema to close for seven months in 2020, before it reopened on 23 October with a showing of Breakfast at Tiffany’s.

== Present day ==
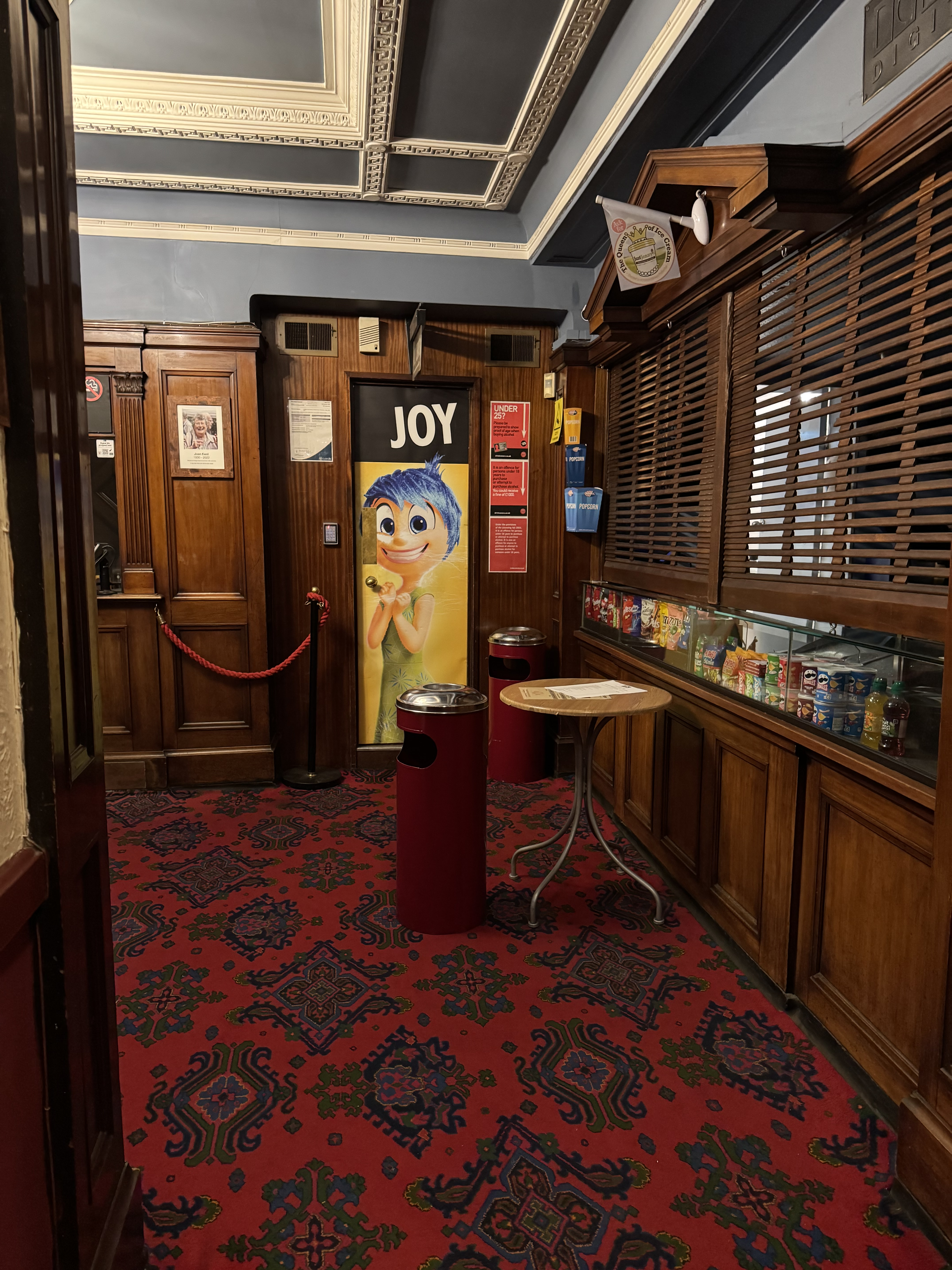
Lobby, featuring ticket office and concession stand

Although it has digital projectors and Dolby Surround 7.1 sound, Cottage Road retains its wood-panelled lobby and aims to provide "cinema-going as it used to be". Ice creams are sold in the auditorium during the interval before films begin, and the national anthem is played at the end of each evening. Every six weeks, the cinema hosts 'Classics at the Cottage' events, where classic movies, often introduced by owner Charles Morris, are shown. Cottage Road's regular programme includes films that appeal to young children and families — according to Morris "Nightmare on Elm Street isn't for Cottage Road. We're lucky to have very loyal and appreciative audiences, and we try to give them what they want". Cottage Road has 466 seats, (Note: Cottage Road's official website gives capacity as 466, but several articles about the cinema state the capacity as 468.) and cinemagoers can choose between regular stalls seating or larger and more comfortable 'Pullman seats', situated in the centre of the cinema, which offer a view of the screen unobstructed by other patrons.

== Bibliography ==
- Armstrong, Jill (30 July 2012). "Leeds' magic little cinema in Cottage Road celebrates its 100th birthday". The Guardian. Archived from the original on 20 December 2018.
- "Second independent cinema to shut". BBC News. 4 July 2005. Archived from the original on 7 March 2019.
- "Cinema boss defends new closure". BBC News. 6 July 2005. Archived from the original on 7 March 2019.
- "Small cinemas get lottery boost". BBC News. 2 August 2008. Archived from the original on 7 March 2019.
- Bradford, Eveleigh (September 2014). "Owen Brooks (1863—1947), pioneer Photographer and Motorcycle enthusiast, founder of Cottage Road Cinema". Thoresby Society. Archived from the original on 7 August 2018.
- "Cinema Auditorium". Cottage Road Cinema. 2018. Archived from the original on 8 December 2017.
- "Cinema History". Cottage Road Cinema. 2018. Archived from the original on 22 August 2017.
- "Cinema History". About — Auditorium. 2019. Archived from the original on 1 August 2019.
- Hastings, Sheena (24 July 2012). "Reel life goes on as cinema celebrates 100 years of big screen entertainment". Yorkshire Post. Archived from the original on 7 March 2019.
- Hazan, Sophie (2006). "Picture is rosy at Cottage Road". Yorkshire Evening Post. Archived from the original on 7 March 2019.
- McTagg, Suzanne (16 July 2012). "Blue plaque honour for oldest cinema in Leeds". Yorkshire Evening Post. Archived from the original on 18 March 2019.
- Marano, Rebecca (24 October 2020). "Headingley's Cottage Road cinema reopens for first time in seven months". Yorkshire Evening Post. Archived from the original on 1 November 2020.
- Mulholland, Greg (16 July 2012). "Early Day Motion 415: Cottage Road Cinema Centenary". Parliament of the United Kingdom. Archived from the original on 7 March 2019.
- Preedy, Robert (2005). Leeds Cinemas. Tempus. ISBN 978-0752435831.
- "The enduring cinemas of LS6". Time Out. 26 June 2015. Archived from the original on 4 July 2015.
- Tuffrey, Peter (2013). West Yorkshire Cinemas and Theatres. Fonthill. ISBN 9781781552063.
- Woodward, Grant; Murphy, Chris (26 July 2005). "Celebrations as Cottage Road cinema gets reprieve". Yorkshire Evening Post. Archived from the original on 7 March 2019.
- Wrathmell, Susan (2008). Leeds. Yale University Press. ISBN 9780300107364.
- "Leeds Cottage Road Cinema ready for 100th birthday bash". Yorkshire Evening Post. 17 February 2011. Archived from the original on 13 March 2019.
- "Leeds is still making cinema history". Yorkshire Evening Post. 25 June 2014. Archived from the original on 7 March 2019.
