= Tish (2023 film) =

2023 documentary film directed by Paul Sng

- Directed by: Paul Sng
- Produced by: Jennifer Corcoran
- Starring: Maxine Peake; Shin-Fei Chen
- Cinematography: Hollie Galloway; David Lee
- Production companies: Demon Snapper Productions; Freya Films; Hopscotch Films; Velvet Joy Productions
- Release date: 2023
- Country: United Kingdom

Tish is a British 2023 documentary film directed by Paul Sng. The film details the life and work of Newcastle social documentary photographer Tish Murtha. The film was critically acclaimed.

== Background ==
Tish Murtha was best known for her work documenting the working-class area of Elswick, in the west end of Newcastle in the late 1970s. At that time Elswick was considered "the worst square mile in England" for its poverty and deprivation. She lived in the area and was able to gain the trust of those she photographed. Her series Youth Unemployment and Elswick Kids were particularly important in bringing her work to a wider audience. After a period living and working in London in the mid-1980s, she returned to Newcastle but struggled to find work and funding in the 1990s and 2000s. She died suddenly of a brain aneurysm in relative obscurity and poverty in March 2013, one day before her 57th birthday.

== Production ==
Her daughter Ella Murtha is custodian of her comprehensive archive of photographs, correspondence and other material and was involved in promoting her work through exhibitions and monographs of her work. Director Paul Sng was involved in editing two books of social documentary photography; Invisible Britain: Portrait of Hope and Resilience in 2018 and The Separated Isle: Invisible Britain in 2021 and Ella Murtha wrote a blurb for him. Sng contacted Ella Murtha and asked if she had considered making a documentary about her mother. She was initially opposed to the project, but met Sng in Newcastle. They bonded over their status as only children. She has one proviso, that her mother's politics would be central to the documentary. The film was produced in the northeast of England with producer Jennifer Corcoran of Freya Films and cinematographer, Hollie Galloway from Middlesbrough.

The film features interviews with Ella and her family members, friends, mentors and photography contemporaries such as David Hurn and Chris Killip. There was no contemporary film footage of Murtha available, so the film features extensive use of Murtha's correspondence and writing, read by actress Maxine Peake. The film features recreations of Murtha working in her dark room, which was filmed in a disused Marks & Spencers shop in Darlington. The set had previously been used for Ricky Gervais's sitcom After Life, the sitcom's production designer Richard Drew was a fan of Murtha's work and adapted the set for the documentary. Murtha, played by Shin-Fei Chen, is only ever seen from behind in the reconstructions.

The film was part crowdfunded through a Kickstarter campaign, with £45,000 raised from 850 contributors and £75,000 of support from Screen Scotland in association with BBC England and BBC Arts. Support was also provided from the BFI Doc Society Fund.

The film premiered, opening the Sheffield documentary festival on 14 June 2023, and went on general release in the United Kingdom on 17 November 2023.

== Reception ==
The film received universally positive reviews and currently holds a 100% rating on Rotten Tomatoes from nine reviews. Writing for The Arts Desk, Graham Fuller described it as "one of the best British films of 2023". The film featured in The Guardian's top 50 films of 2023 at number 46 and made number 10 on the Financial Times's best films of 2023.
