= Sleaford Mods: Invisible Britain =

- Film poster
- Directed by: Paul Sng; Nathan Hannawin
- Written by: Paul Sng
- Produced by: Velvet Joy Productions
- Starring: Sleaford Mods
- Music by: Sleaford Mods & Asa Hudson
- Release date: 3 October 2015 (Doc N Roll Festival)
- Running time: 90 minutes
- Country: United Kingdom
- Language: English
- Budget: £19,000

Sleaford Mods: Invisible Britain is a documentary film following the band Sleaford Mods on a tour of the United Kingdom in the run-up to the 2015 general election. The documentary explores the band itself as well as examining the current political situation in the United Kingdom focusing on opposition to austerity. The film was crowdfunded through Indiegogo.

== Background and content ==
Co-director, Paul Sng, had the idea for the film after interviewing Sleaford Mods in October 2014, and came up with the concept for a documentary that would follow the band on a tour of places which have been neglected by both the government and mainstream media. As well as live footage of the band and conversations with Jason Williamson and Andrew Fearn, in each place the tour visited the filmmakers met with people in the local community to interview them about social issues affecting them.

Examples of the social issues explored include: deindustrialisation and a community project set up by Unite the Union and The National Union of Mineworkers in Barnsley in response to this; job losses at Tata Steelworks in Scunthorpe; and people dying due to changes in how the Department for Work and Pensions make decisions about social security benefit payments.
