= Paul Sng =

British filmmaker

- Born: Paul Eng Kim Sng
- Years active: 2010–present

Paul Eng Kim Sng is a British documentary filmmaker and writer, based in Edinburgh.

== Life and work ==
Sng was born in North London to working-class British and Chinese-Singaporean parents.

He has made films about opposition to the United Kingdom government austerity programme, the shortage of social housing in Britain, and homelessness. Sng has profiled public figures such as Sleaford Mods; Poly Styrene with music writer Zoë Howe and Styrene's daughter Celeste Bell; and Tish Murtha with Murtha's daughter Ella.

== Filmography ==
- Sleaford Mods: Invisible Britain (2015) – written and co-directed by Sng
- Dispossession: The Great Social Housing Swindle (2017) – written, directed and produced by Sng
- Poly Styrene: I Am a Cliché (2021) – co-directed by Sng (with Celeste Bell)
- Year of the Dog (2022) – directed by Sng
- Tish (2023) – directed by Sng

== Publications ==
- Invisible Britain. Bristol: Policy, 2018. Edited by Sng. ISBN 978-1447344117. With a foreword by Michael Sheen.

== Awards ==
- 2020: Co-winner (with Celeste Bell), British Independent Film Award for Best Documentary, British Independent Film Awards 2021, for Poly Styrene: I Am a Cliché
- 2021: Co-winner (with Celeste Bell), Whistler Film Festival Documentary Award, Whistler Film Festival, for Poly Styrene: I Am a Cliché
