= Cinemeccanica =

Italian motion picture equipment company

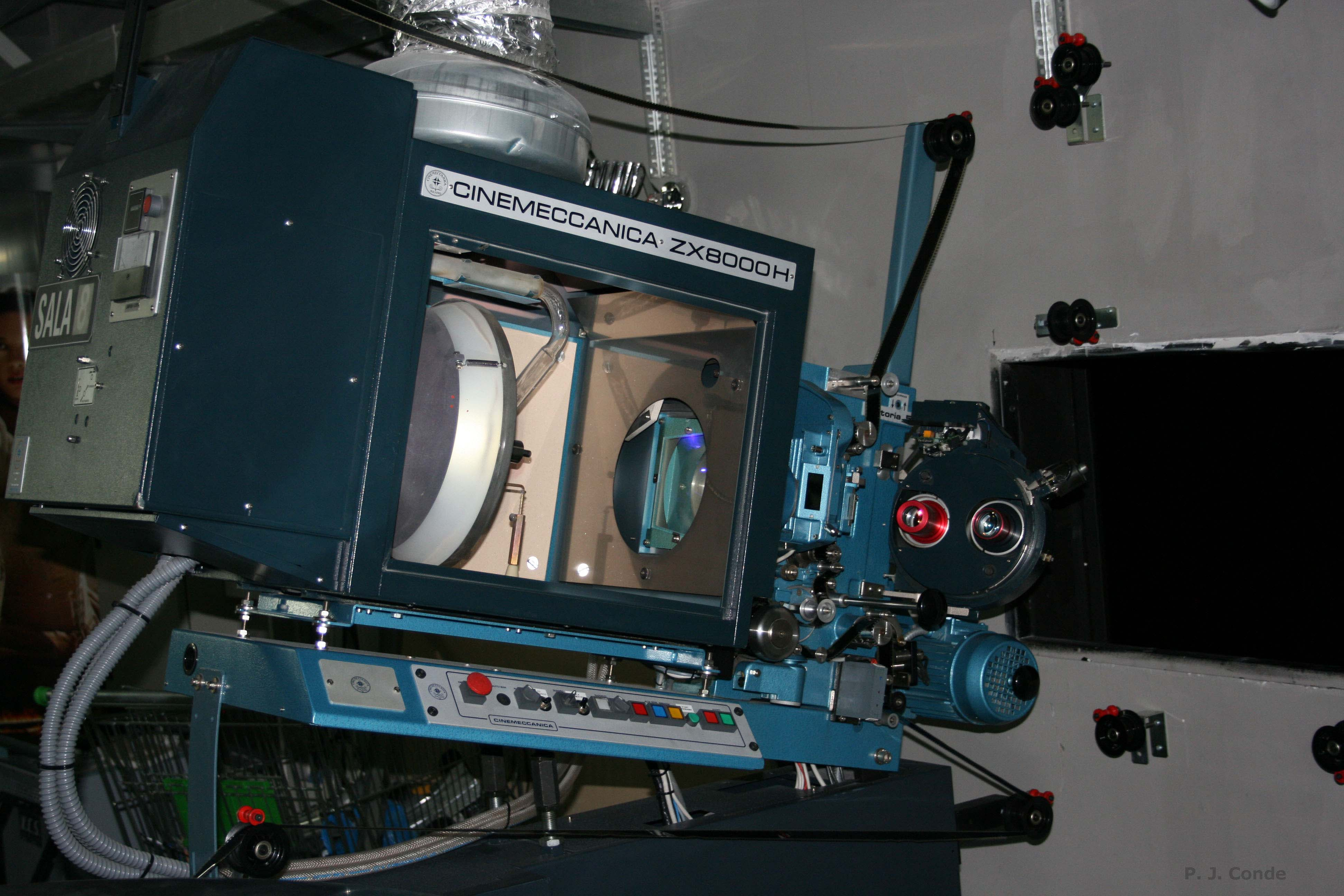
Victoria 5 projector

The sound of the projector running, without the light (Xenon lamp). The projector used in the Nova is an Italian Cinemeccanica projector, Victoria 9 model, one of the last models produced by this firm.

Cinemeccanica is a motion picture equipment company specializing in cinema projectors. The company was formed in 1920 in Milan, Italy. Currently they have two film projectors available, the Victoria 5 (introduced in 1975) and the Victoria 8 (introduced in 1961). A new digital projector, the CMC3 D2 is also available.

The Victoria 8 at one time came in two models, a 35 mm film gauge and a dual 35/70 mm film gauge. The projector has become less popular in recent years with the smaller and cheaper Victoria 5 now the best selling projector from Cinemeccanica.

The company also manufacture film platter systems (the CNR-35N), film rewinders and Dolby Digital and SR soundtrack readers.

== See also ==
- List of Italian Companies
