= British Independent Film Award for Best Technical Achievement =

British film award

- Awarded for: Best Technical Achievement in a British Independent Film
- Country: United Kingdom
- Presented by: BIFA
- First award: 2001
- Final award: 2016
- Currently held by: American Honey – Robbie Ryan (2016)
- Website: www.bifa.org.uk

The British Independent Film Award for Best Technical Achievement was an annual award given by the British Independent Film Awards (BIFA) to recognize below-the-line professionals in various artisan areas in a British independent film. The award was first presented in the 2001 ceremony with Roman Osin being the first recipient of the award for his cinematography on The Warrior.

In May 2017, it was announced that this category would be replaced with nine more specific craft categories in order to better recognize the diverse behind the camera talent in British independent filmmaking.

== Winners and nominees ==
=== 2000s ===
| Year | Film | Recipient(s) | Area |
|---|---|---|---|
| 2001 (4th) | The Warrior | Roman Osin | Cinematography |
| 2001 (4th) | Alone | Jonathan Rudd | Editing |
| 2001 (4th) | Enigma | John Beard | Production Design |
| 2001 (4th) | High Heels and Low Lifes | Jany Temime | Costume Design |
| 2002 (5th) | Morvern Callar | Alwin H. Küchler | Cinematography |
| 2002 (5th) | 24 Hour Party People | Mark Tildesley | Production Design |
| 2002 (5th) | Bloody Sunday | Ivan Strasburg | Cinematography |
| 2002 (5th) | Lawless Heart | Scott Thomas | Editing |
| 2003 (6th) | In This World | Peter Christelis | Editing |
| 2003 (6th) | 16 Years of Alcohol | John Rhodes | Cinematography |
| 2003 (6th) | Bright Young Things | Michael Howells | Production Design |
| 2003 (6th) | Buffalo Soldiers | David Holmes | Music |
| 2003 (6th) | In This World | Tim Alban, Joakim Sundström and Stuart Wilson | Sound |
| 2004 (7th) | Touching the Void | Mike Eley | Cinematography |
| 2004 (7th) | Bride and Prejudice | Eduardo Castro and Ralph Wheeler-Holes | Costume Design |
| 2004 (7th) | Code 46 | Mark Tildesley | Production Design |
| 2004 (7th) | Dead Man's Shoes | Lucas Roche and Chris Wyatt | Editing |
| 2004 (7th) | Enduring Love | Haris Zambarloukos | Cinematography |
| 2005 (8th) | The Descent | Jon Harris | Editing |
| 2005 (8th) | A Cock and Bull Story | Peter Christelis | Editing |
| 2005 (8th) | The Constant Gardener | César Charlone | Cinematography |
| 2005 (8th) | The Libertine | Ben Van Os | Production Design |
| 2005 (8th) | Mrs Henderson Presents | Sandy Powell | Costume Design |
| 2006 (9th) | The Last King of Scotland | Anthony Dod Mantle | Cinematography |
| 2006 (9th) | The Queen | Alan MacDonald | Production Design |
| 2006 (9th) | The Queen | Daniel Phillips | Makeup |
| 2006 (9th) | This Is England | Ludovico Einaudi | Music |
| 2006 (9th) | The Wind That Shakes the Barley | Barry Ackroyd | Cinematography |
| 2007 (10th) | Sunshine | Mark Tildesley | Production Design |
| 2007 (10th) | 28 Weeks Later | Enrique Chediak | Cinematography |
| 2007 (10th) | And When Did You Last See Your Father? | Trevor Waite | Editing |
| 2007 (10th) | Control | Martin Ruhe | Cinematography |
| 2007 (10th) | Hallam Foe | Colin Monie and David Mackenzie | Music |
| 2008 (11th) | Hunger | Sean Bobbitt | Cinematography |
| 2008 (11th) | The Duchess | Michael O'Connor | Costume Design |
| 2008 (11th) | In Bruges | Jon Gregory | Editing |
| 2008 (11th) | Shifty | Harry Escott and Molly Nyman | Music |
| 2008 (11th) | Slumdog Millionaire | Anthony Dod Mantle | Cinematography |
| 2009 (12th) | Bright Star | Greig Fraser | Cinematography |
| 2009 (12th) | Bunny and the Bull | Gary Williamson | Production Design |
| 2009 (12th) | Fish Tank | Robbie Ryan | Cinematography |
| 2009 (12th) | Moon | Clint Mansell | Music |
| 2009 (12th) | Moon | Tony Noble | Production Design |

=== 2010s ===
| Year | Film | Recipient(s) | Area |
|---|---|---|---|
| 2010 (13th) | Monsters | Gareth Edwards | Visual Effects |
| 2010 (13th) | The Arbor | Tim Barker | Sound |
| 2010 (13th) | Brighton Rock | John Mathieson | Cinematography |
| 2010 (13th) | The Illusionist | Sylvain Chomet | Animation |
| 2010 (13th) | The King's Speech | Eve Stewart | Production Design |
| 2011 (14th) | Tinker Tailor Soldier Spy | Maria Djurkovic | Production Design |
| 2011 (14th) | Senna | Chris King and Gregers Sall | Editing |
| 2011 (14th) | Shame | Sean Bobbitt | Cinematography |
| 2011 (14th) | Shame | Joe Walker | Editing |
| 2011 (14th) | We Need to Talk about Kevin | Seamus McGarvey | Cinematography |
| 2012 (15th) | Berberian Sound Studio | Joakim Sundström | Sound Design |
| 2012 (15th) | Berberian Sound Studio | Nic Knowland | Cinematography |
| 2012 (15th) | Broken | Electric Wave Bureau | Music |
| 2012 (15th) | Ginger and Rosa | Robbie Ryan | Cinematography |
| 2012 (15th) | The Imposter | Andrew Hulme | Editing |
| 2013 (16th) | The Selfish Giant | Amy Hubbard | Casting |
| 2013 (16th) | Locke | Justine Wright | Editing |
| 2013 (16th) | Starred Up | Shaheen Baig | Casting |
| 2013 (16th) | Under the Skin | Johnnie Burn | Sound Design |
| 2013 (16th) | Under the Skin | Mica Levi | Music |
| 2014 (17th) | Frank | Stephen Rennicks | Music |
| 2014 (17th) | '71 | Tat Radcliffe | Cinematography |
| 2014 (17th) | '71 | Chris Wyatt | Editing |
| 2014 (17th) | Catch Me Daddy | Robbie Ryan | Cinematography |
| 2014 (17th) | Mr. Turner | Dick Pope | Cinematography |
| 2015 (18th) | Ex Machina | Andrew Whitehurst | Visual Effects |
| 2015 (18th) | Amy | Chris King | Editing |
| 2015 (18th) | Brooklyn | Fiona Weir | Casting |
| 2015 (18th) | Ex Machina | Mark Digby | Production Design |
| 2015 (18th) | Macbeth | Adam Arkapaw | Cinematography |
| 2016 (19th) | American Honey | Robbie Ryan | Cinematography |
| 2016 (19th) | Free Fire | Shaheen Baig | Casting |
| 2016 (19th) | The Girl with All the Gifts | Seb Barker | Visual Effects |
| 2016 (19th) | Notes on Blindness | Joakim Sundström | Sound Design |
| 2016 (19th) | Oasis: Supersonic | Paul Monaghan and Mat Whitecross | Editing |

== Multiple nominations ==
4 nominations

- Robbie Ryan

3 nominations

- Joakim Sundström
- Mark Tildesley

2 nominations

- Shaheen Baig
- Sean Bobbitt
- Peter Christelis
- Anthony Dod Mantle
- Chris King
- Chris Wyatt

== See also ==
- London Film Critics' Circle Award for Technical Achievement
