= British Independent Film Award for Best Supporting Actor =

British film award

- Awarded for: Best Supporting Actor
- Country: United Kingdom
- Presented by: BIFA
- First award: 2008
- Final award: 2021
- Currently held by: Talid Ariss – After Love (2021)
- Website: www.bifa.org.uk

The British Independent Film Award for Best Supporting Actor is a discontinued annual award given by the British Independent Film Awards (BIFA) to recognize the best supporting performance by an actor in a British independent film.

From 2003 to 2007, only one award was presented for supporting performances named Best Supporting Actor/Actress. Since 2008, two categories named Best Supporting Actor and Best Supporting Actress are presented.

Actors Eddie Marsan and Sean Harris are the most nominated actors in this category since its creation in 2008 with three nominations each.

In July 2022, it was announced that the performance categories would be replaced with gender-neutral categories, with both Best Supporting Actor and Best Supporting Actress merging into the Best Lead Performance category. Additionally, a category named Best Joint Lead Performance was created for "two (or exceptionally three) performances that are the joint focus of the film, especially where performances share a large number of scenes and screen time".

== Winners and nominees ==
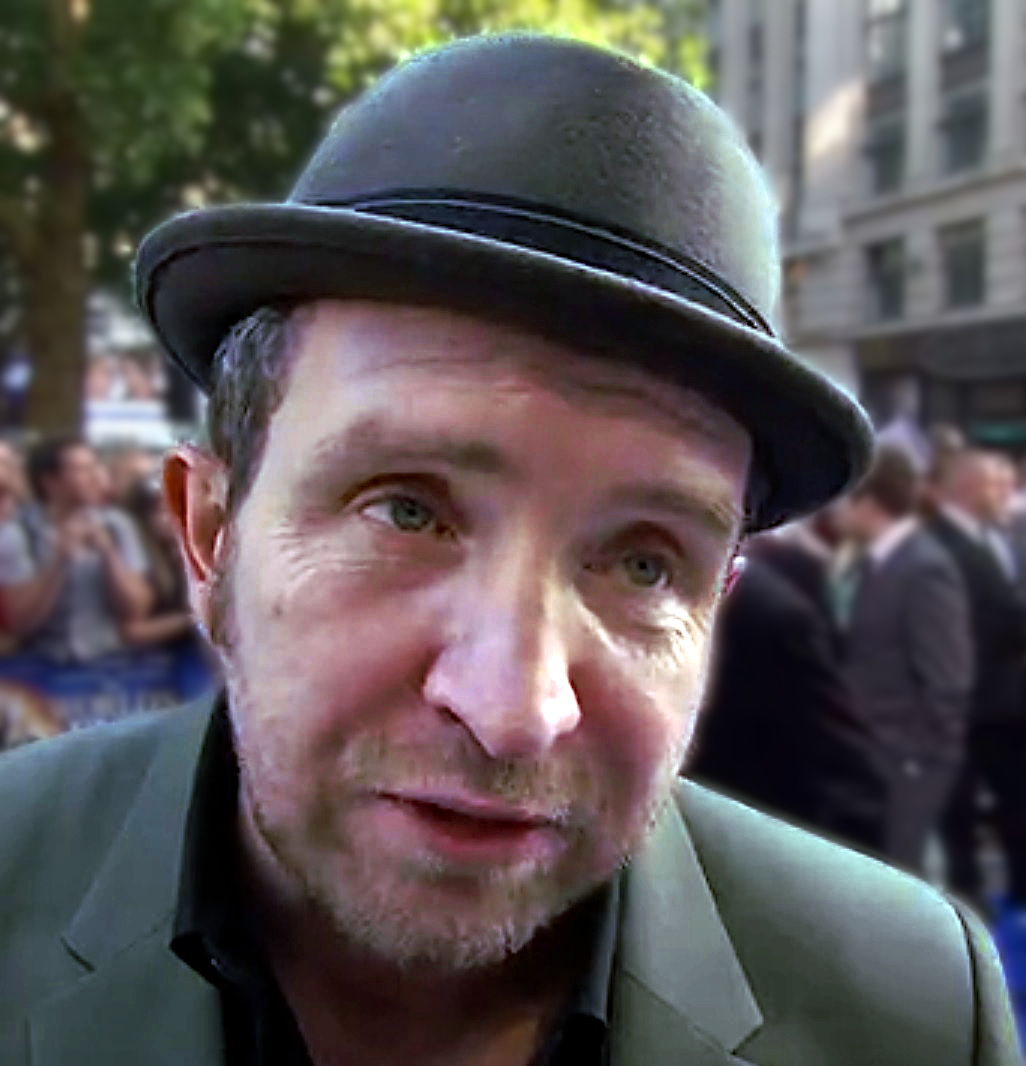
Eddie Marsan has won for Vera Drake (2004) and Happy-Go-Lucky (2008).

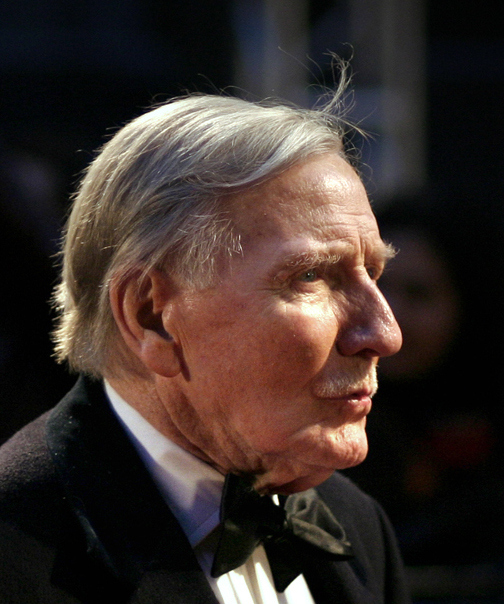
Leslie Phillips won for Venus (2006).

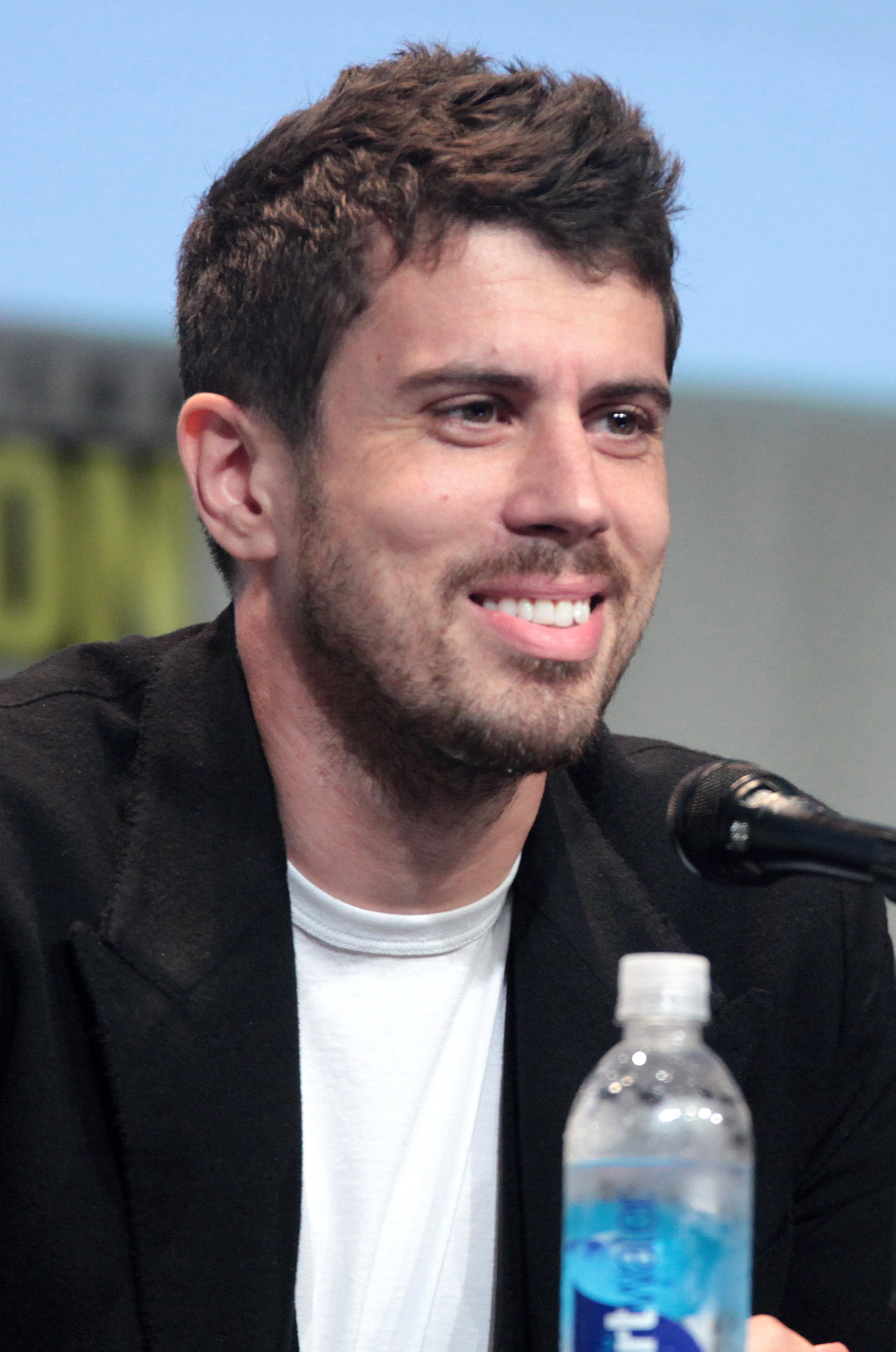
Toby Kebbell won for Control (2007).

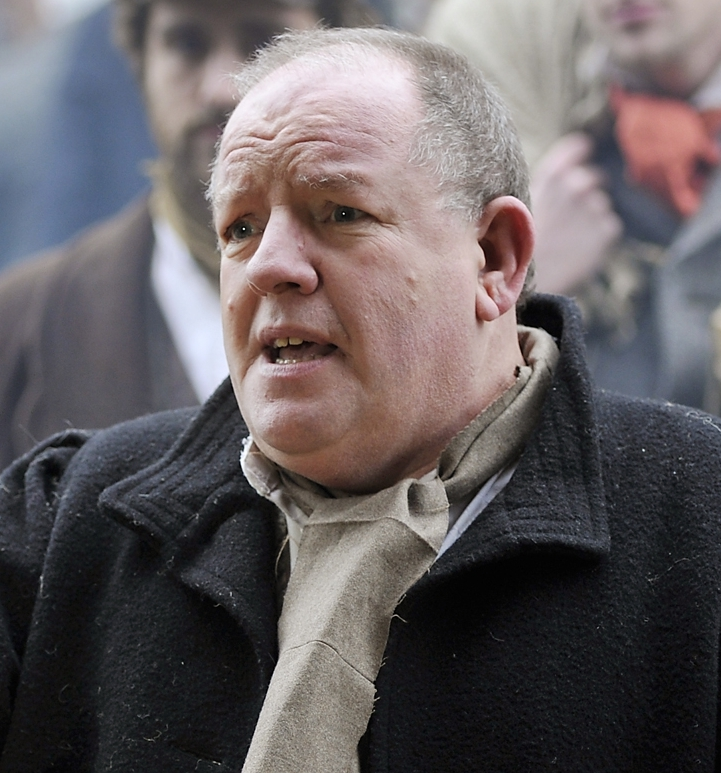
John Henshaw won for Looking for Eric (2009).

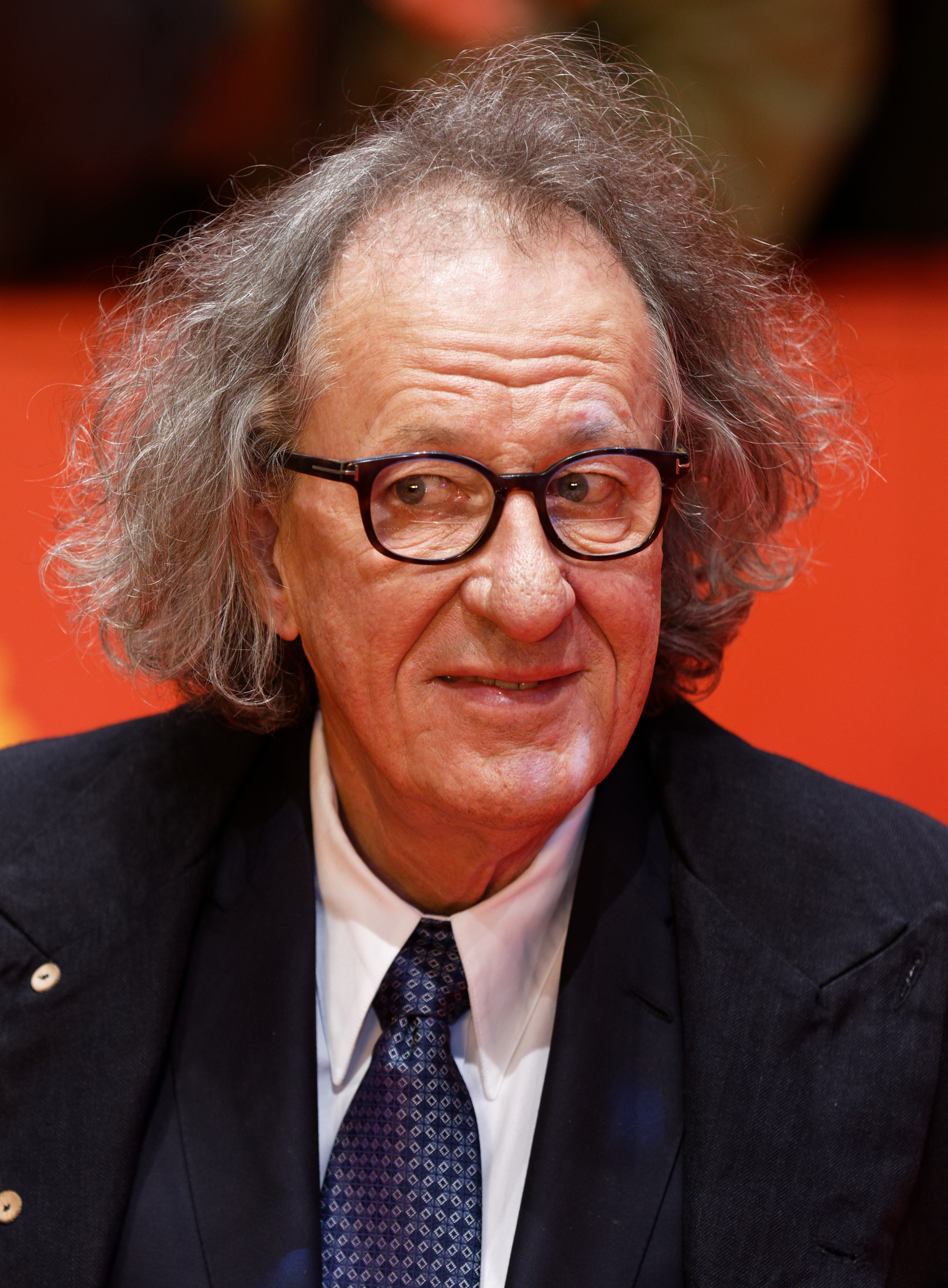
Geoffrey Rush won for The King's Speech (2010).

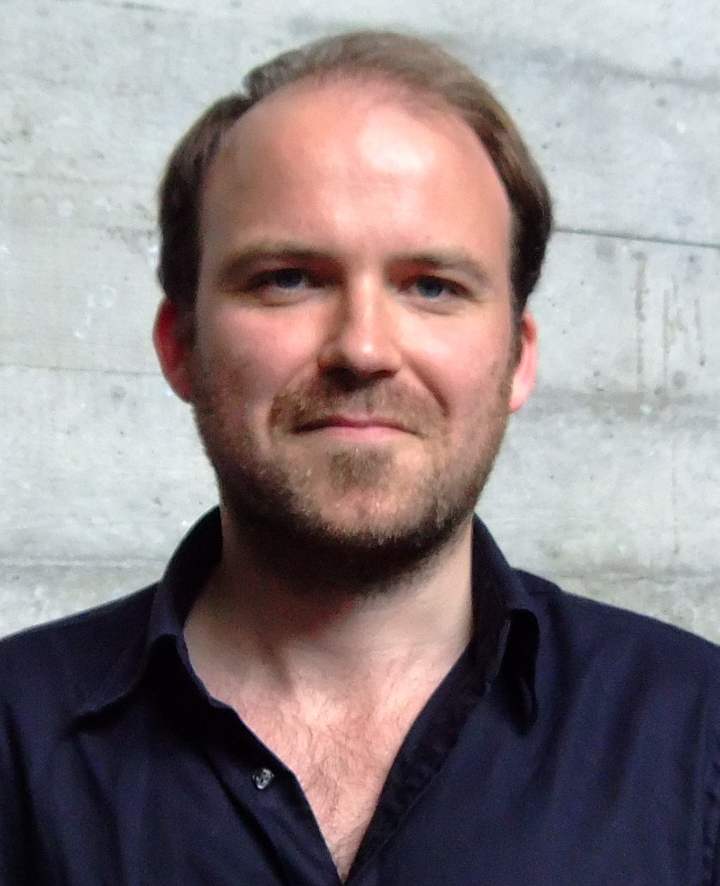
Rory Kinnear won for Broken (2012).

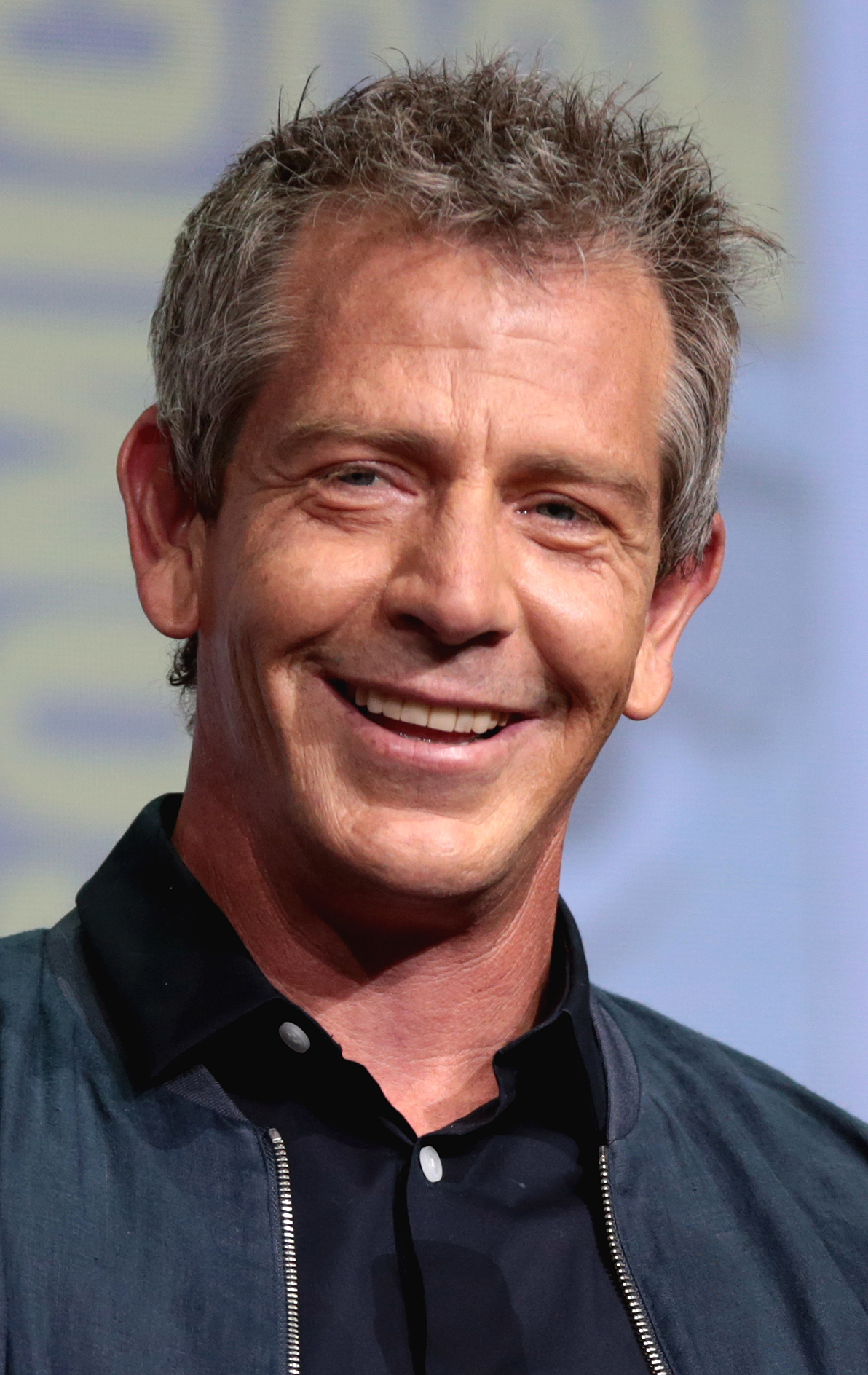
Ben Mendelsohn won for Starred Up (2013).

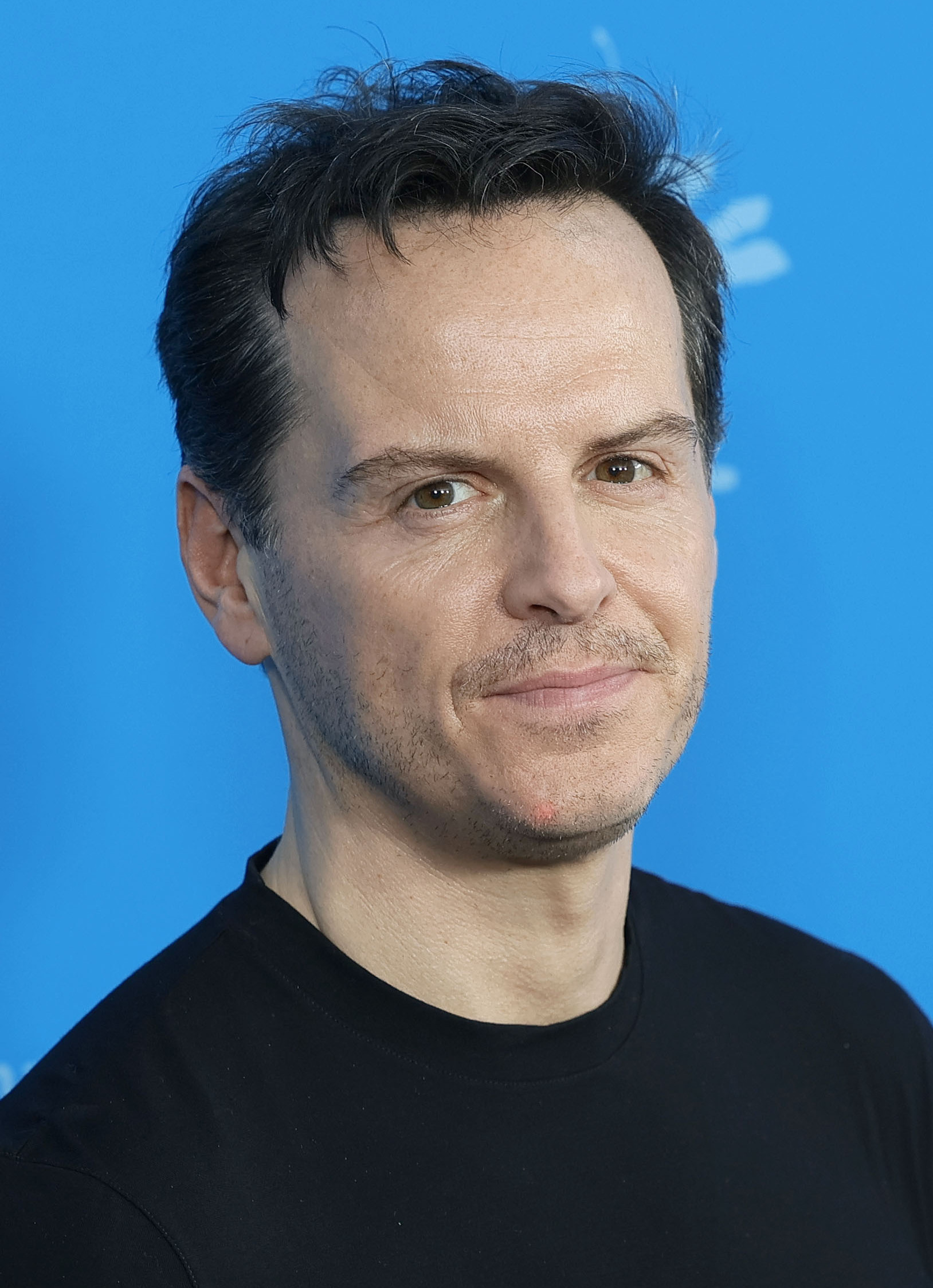
Andrew Scott won for Pride (2014).

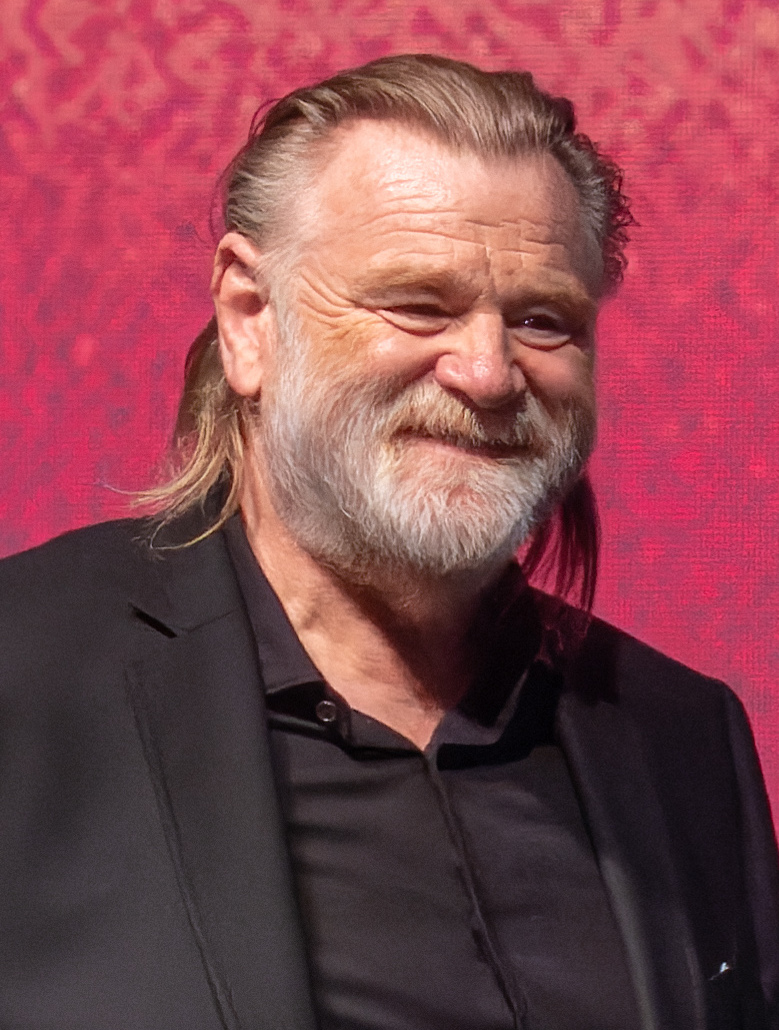
Brendan Gleeson won for Suffragette (2015).

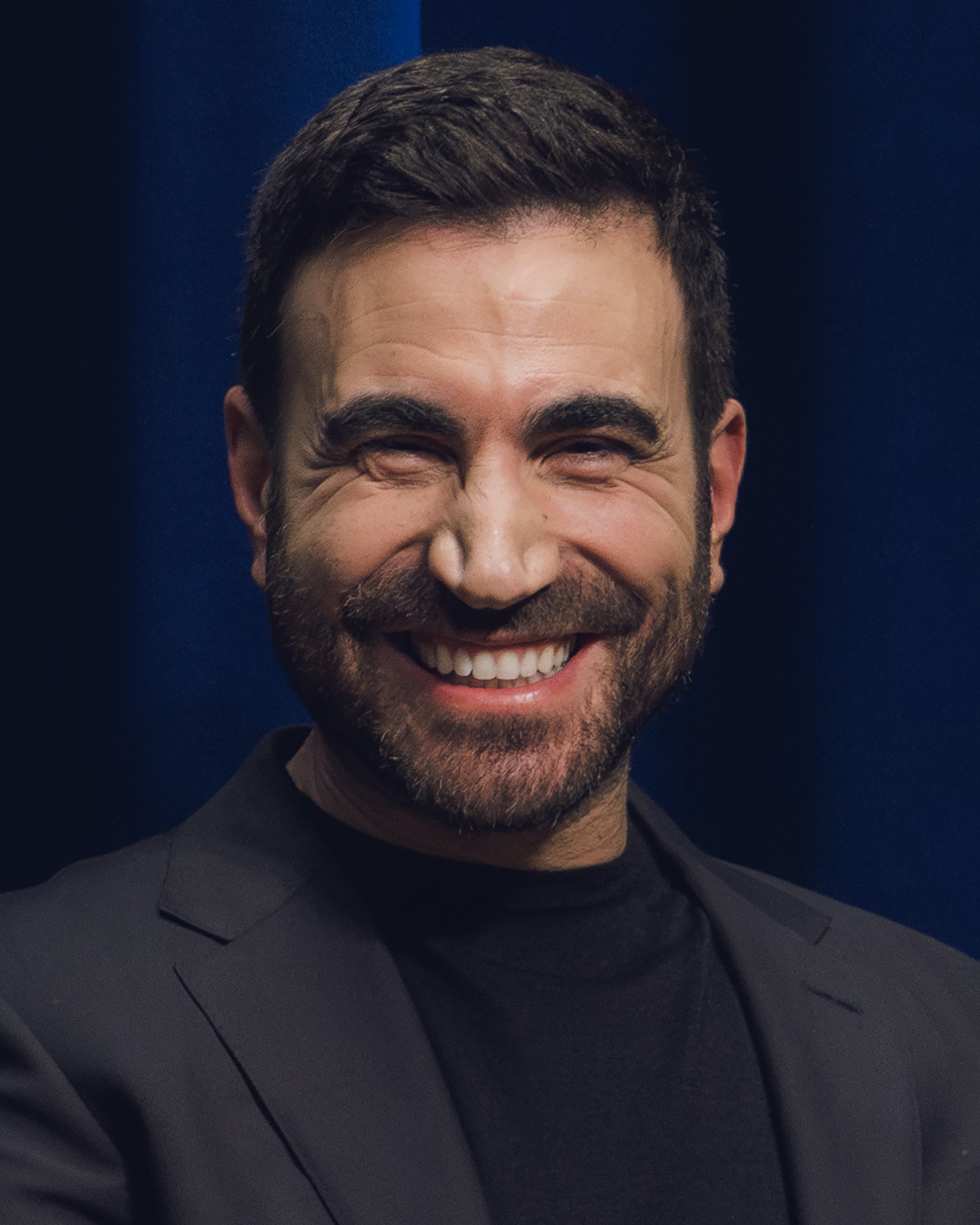
Brett Goldstein won for Adult Life Skills (2016).

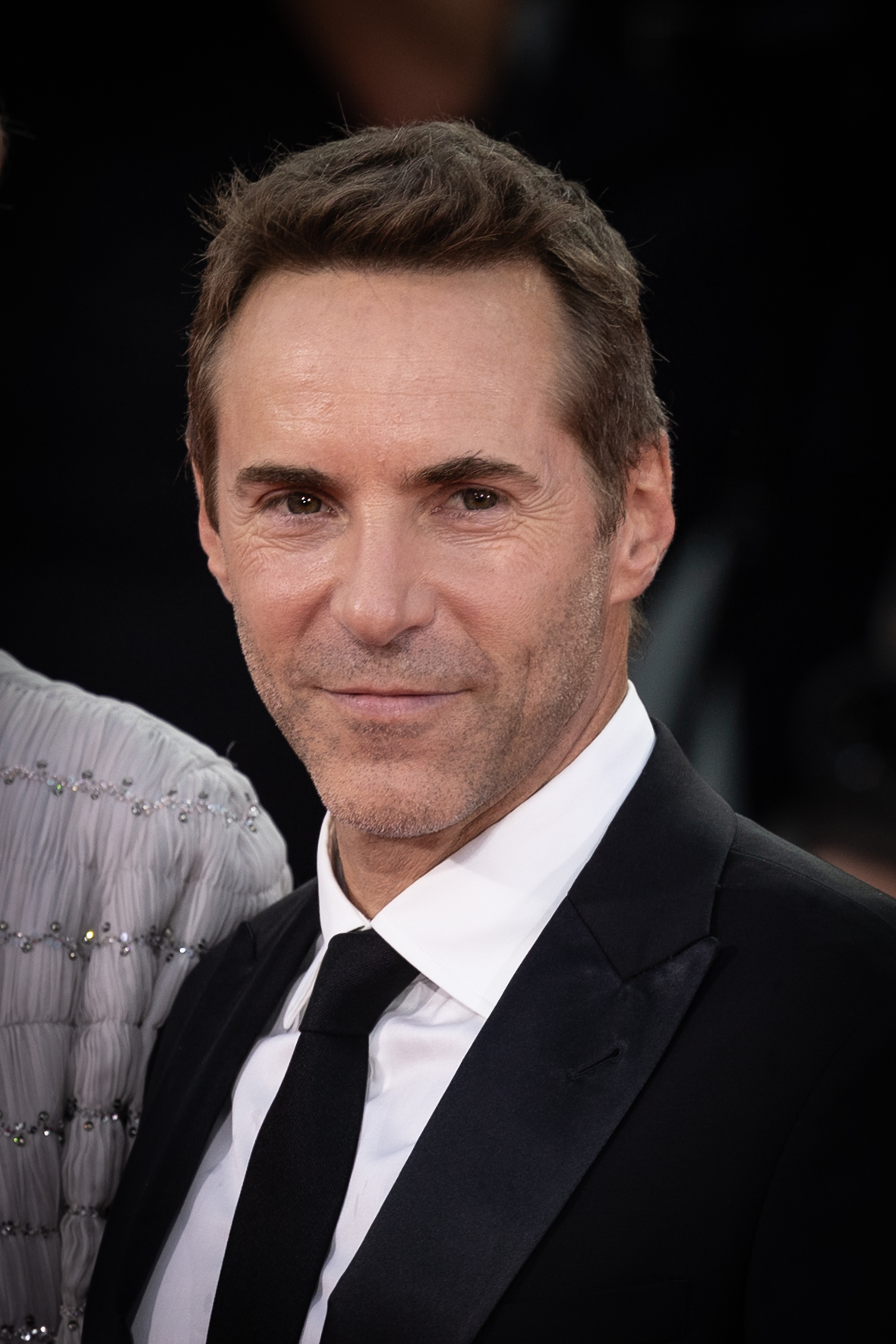
Alessandro Nivola won for Disobedience (2017).

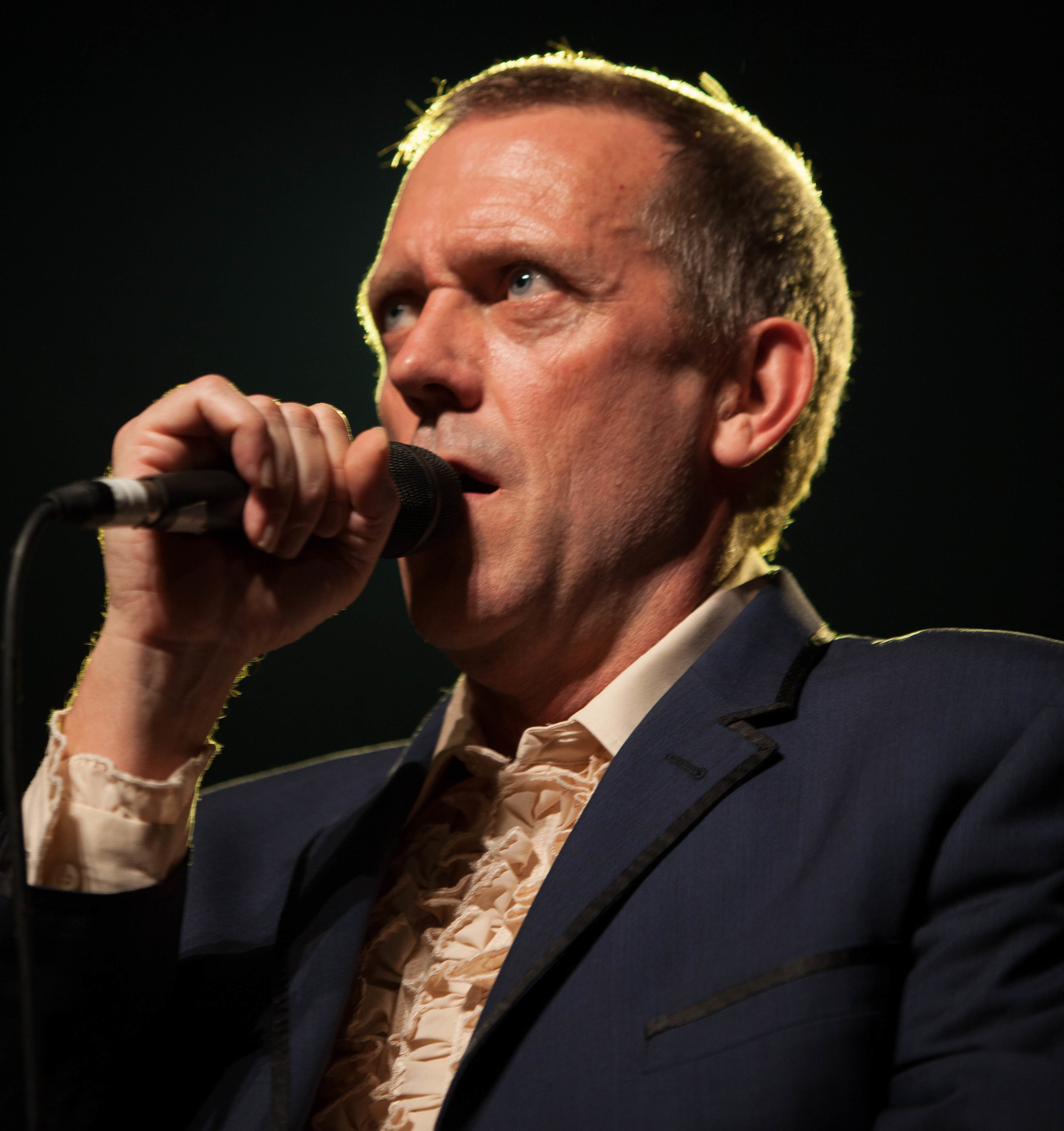
Hugh Laurie won for The Personal History of David Copperfield (2019).

=== 2000s ===
Best Supporting Actor/Actress

| Year | Actor/Actress | Film | Character |
|---|---|---|---|
| 2003 (6th) | Susan Lynch | 16 Years of Alcohol | Mary |
| 2003 (6th) | Shirley Henderson | Wilbur Wants to Kill Himself | Alice |
| 2003 (6th) | Sophie Okonedo | Dirty Pretty Things | Juliette |
| 2003 (6th) | Adrian Rawlins | Wilbur Wants to Kill Himself | Harbour |
| 2003 (6th) | Benedict Wong | Dirty Pretty Things | Guo Yi |
| 2004 (7th) | Eddie Marsan | Vera Drake | Reg |
| 2004 (7th) | Paddy Considine | My Summer of Love | Phil |
| 2004 (7th) | Romola Garai | Rory O'Shea Was Here | Siobhán |
| 2004 (7th) | Samantha Morton | Enduring Love | Claire |
| 2004 (7th) | Gary Stretch | Dead Man's Shoes | Sonny |
| 2005 (8th) | Rosamund Pike | The Libertine | Elizabeth Wilmot, Countess of Rochester |
| 2005 (8th) | Rob Brydon | A Cock and Bull Story | Captain Toby Shandy / Rob Brydon |
| 2005 (8th) | Tom Hollander | The Libertine | George Etherege |
| 2005 (8th) | Bill Nighy | The Constant Gardener | Sir Bernard Pellegrin |
| 2005 (8th) | Kelly Reilly | Mrs Henderson Presents | Maureen Ashford |
| 2006 (9th) | Leslie Phillips | Venus | Ian |
| 2006 (9th) | Martin Compston | Red Road | Stevie |
| 2006 (9th) | Joseph Gilgun | This Is England | Woody |
| 2006 (9th) | Stephen Graham | This Is England | Combo |
| 2006 (9th) | Vanessa Redgrave | Venus | Valerie |
| 2007 (10th) | Toby Kebbell | Control | Rob Gretton |
| 2007 (10th) | Cate Blanchett | Notes on a Scandal | Sheba Hart |
| 2007 (10th) | Colin Firth | And When Did You Last See Your Father? | Blake Morrison |
| 2007 (10th) | Samantha Morton | Control | Deborah Curtis |
| 2007 (10th) | Armin Mueller-Stahl | Eastern Promises | Vor Semyon |

Best Supporting Actor

| Year | Actor | Film | Character |
|---|---|---|---|
| 2008 (11th) | Eddie Marsan | Happy-Go-Lucky | Scott |
| 2008 (11th) | Liam Cunningham | Hunger | Father Dominic Moran |
| 2008 (11th) | Ralph Fiennes | The Duchess | William Cavendish, 5th Duke of Devonshire |
| 2008 (11th) | Ralph Fiennes | In Bruges | Harry Waters |
| 2008 (11th) | Daniel Mays | Shifty | Chris |
| 2009 (12th) | John Henshaw | Looking for Eric | Meatballs |
| 2009 (12th) | Jim Broadbent | The Damned United | Sam Longson |
| 2009 (12th) | Michael Fassbender | Fish Tank | Connor |
| 2009 (12th) | Tom Hollander | In the Loop | Simon Foster |
| 2009 (12th) | Alfred Molina | An Education | Jack Mellor |

=== 2010s ===
| Year | Actor | Film | Character |
|---|---|---|---|
| 2010 (13th) | Geoffrey Rush | The King's Speech | Lionel Logue |
| 2010 (13th) | Andrew Garfield | Never Let Me Go | Tommy D |
| 2010 (13th) | Bob Hoskins | Made in Dagenham | Albert Passingham |
| 2010 (13th) | Kayvan Novak | Four Lions | Waj |
| 2010 (13th) | Guy Pearce | The King's Speech | King Edward VIII |
| 2011 (14th) | Michael Smiley | Kill List | Gal |
| 2011 (14th) | Benedict Cumberbatch | Tinker Tailor Soldier Spy | Peter Guilliam |
| 2011 (14th) | Tom Hardy | Tinker Tailor Soldier Spy | Ricki Tarr |
| 2011 (14th) | Eddie Marsan | Tyrannosaur | James |
| 2011 (14th) | Ezra Miller | We Need to Talk about Kevin | Kevin Khatchadourian |
| 2012 (15th) | Rory Kinnear | Broken | Bob Oswald |
| 2012 (15th) | Billy Connolly | Quartet | Wilfred "Wilf" Bond |
| 2012 (15th) | Domhnall Gleeson | Shadow Dancer | Connor McVeigh |
| 2012 (15th) | Cillian Murphy | Broken | Mike Kiernan |
| 2012 (15th) | Tom Wilkinson | The Best Exotic Marigold Hotel | Graham Dashwood |
| 2013 (16th) | Ben Mendelsohn | Starred Up | Neville Love |
| 2013 (16th) | John Arcilla | Metro Manila | Douglas Ong |
| 2013 (16th) | Rupert Friend | Starred Up | Oliver Baumer |
| 2013 (16th) | Jeff Goldblum | Le Week-End | Morgan |
| 2013 (16th) | Eddie Marsan | Filth | Clifford Blades |
| 2014 (17th) | Andrew Scott | Pride | Gethin Roberts |
| 2014 (17th) | Michael Fassbender | Frank | Frank |
| 2014 (17th) | Sean Harris | '71 | Captain Sandy Brown |
| 2014 (17th) | Ben Schnetzer | Pride | Mark Ashton |
| 2014 (17th) | Rafe Spall | X+Y | Martin Humphreys |
| 2015 (18th) | Brendan Gleeson | Suffragette | Arthur Steed |
| 2015 (18th) | Luke Evans | High-Rise | Richard Wilder |
| 2015 (18th) | Domhnall Gleeson | Brooklyn | Jim Farrell |
| 2015 (18th) | Sean Harris | Macbeth | Macduff |
| 2015 (18th) | Ben Whishaw | The Lobster | The Limping Man |
| 2016 (19th) | Brett Goldstein | Adult Life Skills | Brendan |
| 2016 (19th) | Jamie Dornan | Anthropoid | Jan Kubiš |
| 2016 (19th) | Sean Harris | Trespass Against Us | Gordon Bennett |
| 2016 (19th) | Arinze Kene | The Pass | Ade |
| 2016 (19th) | Christopher Lloyd | I Am Not a Serial Killer | Bill Crowley |
| 2017 (20th) | Simon Russell Beale | The Death of Stalin | Lavrentiy Beria |
| 2017 (20th) | Steve Buscemi | The Death of Stalin | Nikita Khrushchev |
| 2017 (20th) | Woody Harrelson | Three Billboards Outside Ebbing, Missouri | Bill Willoughby |
| 2017 (20th) | Ian Hart | God's Own Country | Martin Saxby |
| 2017 (20th) | Sam Rockwell | Three Billboards Outside Ebbing, Missouri | Jason Dixon |
| 2018 (21st) | Alessandro Nivola | Disobedience | Dovid Kuperman |
| 2018 (21st) | Steve Buscemi | Lean on Pete | Del Montgomery |
| 2018 (21st) | Barry Keoghan | American Animals | Spencer Reinhard |
| 2018 (21st) | Evan Peters | American Animals | Warren Lipka |
| 2018 (21st) | Dominic West | Colette | Henry Gauthier-Villars |
| 2019 (22nd) | Hugh Laurie | The Personal History of David Copperfield | Mr. Dick |
| 2019 (22nd) | Chiwetel Ejiofor | The Boy Who Harnessed the Wind | Trywell Kamkwamba |
| 2019 (22nd) | Peter Mullan | The Vanishing | Thomas Marshall |
| 2019 (22nd) | Edlison Manuel Olbera Núñez | Yuli: The Carlos Acosta Story | Young Carlos Acosta |
| 2019 (22nd) | Bluey Robinson | Dirty God | Naz |

=== 2020s ===
| Year | Actor | Film | Character |
|---|---|---|---|
| 2020 (23rd) | D'angelou Osei Kissiedu | Rocks | Emmanuel Omotoso |
| 2020 (23rd) | Harris Dickinson | County Lines | Simon |
| 2020 (23rd) | Barry Keoghan | Calm with Horses | Dymphna |
| 2020 (23rd) | Alyy Khan | Mogul Mowgli | Bashir |
| 2020 (23rd) | Merab Ninidze | The Courier | Oleg Penkovsky |
| 2021 (24th) | Talid Ariss | After Love | Solomon |
| 2021 (24th) | Richard Ayoade | The Souvenir Part II | Patrick |
| 2021 (24th) | Ciarán Hinds | Belfast | Pop |
| 2021 (24th) | Ray Panthaki | Boiling Point | Freeman |
| 2021 (24th) | Lucian River-Chauhan | Encounter | Jay Kahn |

== Multiple nominations ==
3 nominations

- Sean Harris
- Eddie Marsan

2 nominations

- Steve Buscemi
- Michael Fassbender
- Ralph Fiennes
- Domhnall Gleeson
- Barry Keoghan

== See also ==
- Academy Award for Best Supporting Actor
- BAFTA Award for Best Actor in a Supporting Role
- Critics' Choice Movie Award for Best Supporting Actor
- Golden Globe Award for Best Supporting Actor – Motion Picture
- Screen Actors Guild Award for Outstanding Performance by a Male Actor in a Supporting Role
