= Frank (soundtrack) =

Frank (Original Motion Picture Soundtrack)

Soundtrack album by Stephen Rennicks and various artists
- Released: 4 August 2014
- Genre: Film soundtrack
- Length: 64:00
- Label: Silva Screen

Stephen Rennicks chronology
What Richard Did (2012)	Frank (2014)	Room (2014)

Frank (Original Motion Picture Soundtrack) is the soundtrack album to the 2014 film Frank directed by Lenny Abrahamson. The album consists of original songs composed by Stephen Rennicks and performed by Domhnall Gleeson and Michael Fassbender and his fictional band Soronprfbs. Besides singing, Gleeson further composed and wrote a few numbers which are bit songs compiled into individual songs. The lyrics for the songs were written by Abrahamson, Jon Ronson and Rennicks.

== Development ==
Frank is Rennicks' second collaboration with Abrahamson after What Richard Did (2012). Rennicks was involved during the film's pre-production, where besides composing, he further served as the vocal coach to the principal characters. He wrote 70 musical pieces, combining both songs and incidental underscore. Most of the songs were performed live by the cast. Regarding the music, Abrahamson described it as "eclectic, strange, deliberately hard to pin down because we wanted Frank's character to be permanently exploring musical possibilities."

== Reception ==
Henry Barnes of The Guardian described the music as "spiky, abrasive and extremely hard to predict". John Anderson of The Wall Street Journal opined that Rennicks' music "turns into a brilliantly inaccessible amalgam of Sun Ra, [Frank] Zappa and John Cage". Donald Clarke of The Irish Times wrote "Stephen Rennicks's music is quite brilliant: odder yet less mannered than most of the Brooklyn-loft sub-folk baloney".

== Track listing ==
Frank (Original Motion Picture Soundtrack) track listing
No.	Title	Lyrics	Music	Artist(s)	Length
1.	"Jon's Crap Songs (Note: the song itself consisted of six other songs: "Endless Rolling Waves", "Children Building Castles In The Sand", "Band's Playing In My Town", "Lady In The Red Coat", "Little Boxes", "Suburbia")"	Lenny Abrahamson; Jon Ronson; Domhnall Gleeson	Gleeson; Stephen Rennicks	Gleeson	2:43
2.	"Ginger Crouton"	Abrahamson	Rennicks	Michael Fassbender; The Soronprfbs; Rennicks	3:42
3.	"Welcome To Vetno"		Rennicks	Rennicks	0:45
4.	"Lay an Egg"		Rennicks	Soronprfbs; Rennicks	2:27
5.	"Frank's Dawn Chorus"		Rennicks	Rennicks	1:22
6.	"Jon Shares His Songs (Note: the song itself consists of five other songs: "Blues Warm Up", "Für Elise", "Walking Down The Street", "Lady In The Red Coat" and "Crouton Piano")"		Gleeson; Rennicks; Ludwig van Beethoven	Gleeson	1:09
7.	"Lone Standing Tuft"	Abrahamson; Rennicks	Rennicks	Fassbender; Rennicks	1:46
8.	"Work Begins in Earnest"		Rennicks	Rennicks	1:44
9.	"Creaky Door"	Abrahamson; Rennicks	Rennicks	Soronprfbs	6:25
10.	"Be Still (Don's Song)"	Rennicks	Rennicks	Scoot McNairy; Darragh O'Kelly; Rennicks	1:25
11.	"Idiot Shriek"		Rennicks	Rennicks	0:43
12.	"The Holidaymakers"		Rennicks	Rennicks; Evanna Lyons	0:58
13.	"Again"		Rennicks	Soronprfbs	0:39
14.	"Jon's Song Changed by Frank and Clara"		O'Kelly; Gleeson; Rennicks	Fassbender; Gleeson; Rennicks	1:22
15.	"Secure the Galactic Perimeter"	Abrahamson	Rennicks	Fassbender; Soronprfbs; Rennicks	5:02
16.	"Broken"	Rennicks	Rennicks	Fassbender; Soronprfbs; Rennicks	2:08
17.	"Viking Funeral"		Rennicks	Orchestra; Karl Ronan; Rennicks	2:09
18.	"Just Like 'Paris Texas'"		Rennicks	Rennicks	2:18
19.	"SXSW"		Rennicks; Hugh Drumm	Rennicks; Drumm	0:57
20.	"I'm Just Me"	Abrahamson; Rennicks	Rennicks; Drumm	Jordyn Aurora Aquino; Rennicks	2:00
21.	"Frank's Most Likeable Song... Ever"	Ronson; Rennicks	Rennicks	Fassbender; Rennicks	0:33
22.	"The Music's Shit"		Rennicks	Rennicks	0:33
23.	"#findfrank"		Rennicks	Rennicks	1:15
24.	"Lighthouse Keeper"		Erika Eigen	Maggie Gyllenhaal; Soronprfbs; Rennicks	1:49
25.	"I Love You All"	Abrahamson; Rennicks	Rennicks	Fassbender; Soronprfbs; Rennicks	2:54
26.	"I Love You All (Credits)"	Abrahamson; Rennicks	Rennicks	Fassbender; Carla Azar; Rennicks	3:20
27.	"All Broken (Credits)"	Rennicks	Rennicks	Fassbender; O'Kelly	2:07
28.	"Tuft (Credits)"	Abrahamson; Rennicks	Rennicks	Rennicks; Abrahamson	2:09
29.	"Frank's Cacophony"	Rennicks	Rennicks	Fassbender; Rennicks	1:20
30.	"Stop Sign"	Rennicks	Rennicks	Fassbender; Rennicks	2:24
31.	"I Love You All" (radio mix)	Abrahamson; Rennicks	Rennicks	Fassbender; Azar; Rennicks	3:52
Total length:					64:00

== Charts ==
Chart performance for Frank (Original Motion Picture Soundtrack)
Chart (2014)	Peak position
UK Soundtrack Albums (OCC)	15
UK Vinyl Albums (OCC)	36
