= Sean Harris =

British actor (born 1966)

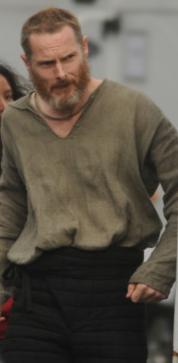
- Harris in 2014 portraying MacDuff on the set of Macbeth
- Born: 1 June 1966 (age 60); Bethnal Green, London
- Education: Drama Centre London
- Occupation: Actor
- Years active: 1994–present

Sean Harris (born 1 June 1966) is an English actor. He played Ian Curtis in 24 Hour Party People (2002), Micheletto Corella in The Borgias (2011–2013), Fifield in Prometheus (2012), Solomon Lane in Mission: Impossible – Rogue Nation (2015) and Mission: Impossible – Fallout (2018), Philip in Possum (2018), William Gascoigne in The King (2019), Henry Peter Teague / Peter Morley in The Stranger (2022) for which he won the AACTA Award for Best Actor in a Supporting Role, and Jacob Pearce in Paris Has Fallen (2024).

Harris won a British Academy Television Award for Best Actor for his role in the miniseries Southcliffe (2013) and received three consecutive nominations for the BIFA for Best Supporting Actor.

== Early life and education ==
Harris was born on 1 June 1966 in Bethnal Green and grew up in Lowestoft, Suffolk. He attended Denes High School, now the Ormiston Denes Academy, in Lowestoft.

At 23, he moved to London to train at the Drama Centre London from 1989 to 1992.

== Career ==
=== Stage ===
Harris was a member of the Glasgow Citizens Theatre, where he performed in stage productions such as Tybalt in Romeo and Juliet directed by Giles Havergal and as Carino in Don Juan directed by Robert David MacDonald. He also appeared as Lysander in a production of A Midsummer Night's Dream, directed by Matthew Lloyd at the Haymarket Theatre (Leicester) and as Johnny in a Nottingham Playhouse production of Angels Rave On, directed by Jonathan Church.

=== Television ===
Harris' television credits include serial killer Ian Brady, on ITV1's television mini-series, See No Evil: The Moors Murders (2006), the 2007 television films Wedding Belles, Channel 4's drama series Cape Wrath (Meadowlands in the United States) as Gordon Ormond and the BBC series Ashes to Ashes as Arthur Layton.

In 2009, he played corrupt Detective Inspector Bob Craven in Channel 4's critically acclaimed Red Riding trilogy, and as photographer Anton Blair in Dean Cavanagh's comedy series, Svengali.

In the BBC TV drama Five Daughters (2010), Harris portrayed Brian Tobin, co-founder of the drug treatment facility, The Iceni Project, based in Suffolk. In preparing to play Tobin, Harris followed the real Brian Tobin around during pre-production.

From 2011 to 2013, Harris appeared as the assassin Micheletto in The Borgias, a series created by Neil Jordan. In 2013, he starred as Stephen Morton in the Channel 4 drama Southcliffe, for which Harris won a BAFTA award for Best Actor in 2014. He also played Joss Merlyn in the poorly received BBC adaptation of Jamaica Inn, which became a subject of controversy and made national news over its mumbling cast and other sound problems.

He appears as the disfigured former soldier turned terrorist mastermind Jacob Pearce in the 2024 French/British action thriller series Paris Has Fallen.

=== Film ===
Harris played the main cast role of Thomas the Disciple, and later Thomas the Apostle in the 1999 biblical, historical, drama television film Jesus. His notable roles include that of Joy Division's lead singer Ian Curtis in Michael Winterbottom's 2002 film 24 Hour Party People and as Steven in the film short True Love (Once Removed), directed by Kevin Thomas. The film won Best Short Film at both the Palm Springs and Houston Film Festivals, was selected for the several international festivals, and also qualified for an Oscar nomination in 2004.

Harris also played Nick Sidney in the 2005 mockumentary Brothers of the Head, directed by Keith Fulton and Louis Pepe.

In 2007, he appeared in his first feature film lead role as Eddie in Saxon, directed by Greg Loftin. In 2009, he played Stretch in Harry Brown, directed by Daniel Barber.

In 2010, Harris appeared in another film short, Native Son, written and directed by Scottish director Scott Graham. It premiered at the 2010 Cannes Film Festival.

In 2012, he played Fifield in Ridley Scott's Prometheus.

In 2014, Harris played Mick Santino in Deliver Us from Evil (2014), directed by Scott Derrickson and based upon the 2001 novel "Beware the Night" by Ralph Sarchie and Lisa Collier Cool. He was cast by Derrickson for the film, without an interview, based upon the director had seen the actor's performance in Harry Brown. That same year, he appeared as Gene Womack in Guy Myhill's The Goob. Myhill previously directed Harris in two film shorts, Two Halftimes to Hell (1997) and The Fabulous Bilsons (2001). Harris finished the year with his performances as Captain Sandy Browning in '71, directed by Yann Demange, for which he earned a 2014 British Independent Film Award nomination for Best Supporting Actor, and he starred as Campbell in Serena (2014), directed by Susanne Bier.

In 2015, Harris appeared as Solomon Lane in Mission: Impossible – Rogue Nation, directed by Christopher McQuarrie, and as Macduff in Justin Kurzel's Macbeth earning another BIFA nomination. In 2016, he starred in the crime drama Trespass Against Us, in a cast that included Michael Fassbender, Brendan Gleeson, and Rory Kinnear. His performance in the film merited a third BIFA nomination in a row.

Harris filmed Possum in 2016, a film by Matthew Holness, in which he plays the main character. He reprised his role as Solomon Lane in the sequel Mission: Impossible – Fallout (2018).

In 2021, Harris portrayed Darren McGrady, the Royal Head Chef, in the film Spencer, and a frail, aged King Arthur in the film The Green Knight.

=== Music videos ===
Harris made a cameo appearance as a clown in a music video for the Norwich band the Black Sharks' debut album titled Lose Control, directed by Myhill (evidently filmed at the same time as The Fabulous Bilsons).

In 2007, he appeared in a video for Mark Ronson's "Stop Me".

In 2012, Harris appeared in London-based music group Barbarossa's video short, Battles, directed by Montserrat Lombard.

== Filmography ==
=== Film ===
Year	Title	Role	Notes	Ref.
1997	Two Half-Times to Hell	Tom	Short film	
1997	Wet Work	Sean	Short film	
2001	The Discovery of Heaven	Bart Bork		
2001	The Bilsons	Perry	Short film	
2002	True Love (Once Removed)	Steven	Short film	
2002	Tom & Thomas	Kevin		
2002	24 Hour Party People	Ian Curtis		
2002	Pay Day	Andy	Short film	
2003	Nicotine Yellow	Diggie	Short film	
2004	Trauma	Roland		
2004	Creep	Craig, the "Creep"		
2004	The Hare	Bourne	Short film	
2005	Asylum	Nick		
2005	Frozen	Hurricane Frank		
2005	Brothers of the Head	Nick Sidney		
2005	Isolation	Jamie		
2007	Outlaw	Simon Hillier		
2007	Saxon	Eddie		
2009	Harry Brown	Stretch		
2010	Native Son	John	Short film	
2010	Brighton Rock	Hale		
2011	A Lonely Place to Die	Mr Kidd		
2012	Prometheus	Fifield		
2014	Deliver Us from Evil	Santino		
2014	'71	Captain Sandy Browning		
2014	Serena	Campbell		
2015	The Goob	Gene Womack		
2015	Paradise Lost?	Satan	Short film	
2015	Mission: Impossible – Rogue Nation	Solomon Lane		
2015	Macbeth	Macduff		
2016	Trespass Against Us	Gordon Bennett		
2018	Mission: Impossible – Fallout	Solomon Lane		
2018	Possum	Philip		
2019	The King	William Gascoigne		
2020	The Banishing	Harry Reed		
2021	The Green Knight	King Arthur		
2021	Spencer	Darren McGrady		
2022	The Stranger	Henry Teague		
2027	The Take	TBA	Post-production	
TBA	Wizards!	TBA	Post-production	

=== Television ===
Year	Title	Role	Notes	Ref.
1994	Minder	Dean	Episode: "Bring Me the Head of Arthur Daley"	
1994; 1997; 2002	The Bill	Matthew Grogan; Russell Hines; Stuart Kennedy	3 episodes	
1995	Signs and Wonders	Carl Maynard	Television film	
1995	The Vet	Neil Fairbrother	Episode: "Home Truths"	
1996	A Mug's Game	Con		
1998	Kavanagh QC	Mark Holmes	Episode: "Care in the Community"	
1999	Jesus	Thomas	Television film	
1999	Hot House	Cheddar	Television film	
2000	Casualty	Tim Vanner	Episode: "Starting Over"	
2001	The Hunt	Clem Mackie	Television film	
2002	Judge John Deed	Gerry Hewitt	Episode: "Political Expediency"	
2003	The Vice	Miles Wilson	Episode: "Control"	
2003	Strange	Robin Thomas	Episode: "Asmoth"	
2006	See No Evil: The Moors Murders	Ian Brady	Television film	
2007	Wedding Belles	Adrian Collins	Television film	
2007	Cape Wrath	Gordon Ormond	3 episodes	
2008	Ashes to Ashes	Arthur Layton	2 episodes	
2009	Red Riding	Sgt/DSupt Bob Craven	Limited series 3 episodes	
2009	Law & Order: UK	Roland Kirk	Episode: "Community Service"	
2009	Waking the Dead	Radovan Sredinic	2 episodes	
2010	Five Daughters	Brian Tobin	3 episodes	
2011–2013	The Borgias	Micheletto Corella	27 episodes	
2013	Southcliffe	Stephen Morton	4 episodes	
2014	Jamaica Inn	Joss Merlyn	3 episodes	
2023	The Gold	Gordon Parry	6 episodes	
2024	Paris Has Fallen	Jacob Pearce	8 episodes	
TBA	Assassin's Creed	TBA	Recurring role	

== Awards and nominations ==
Year	Awards	Category	Work	Result	Ref.
2003	Chlotrudis Awards	Best Supporting Actor	24 Hour Party People	Nominated	
2011	Austin Fantastic Fest	Horror Jury Prize - Best Actor – Feature	A Lonely Place to Die	Won	
2014	60th British Academy Television Awards	BAFTA Award for Best Leading Actor	Southcliffe	Won	
2014	17th British Independent Film Awards	BIFA for Best Supporting Actor	'71	Nominated	
2015	18th British Independent Film Awards	BIFA for Best Supporting Actor	Macbeth	Nominated	
2016	19th British Independent Film Awards	BIFA for Best Supporting Actor	Trespass Against Us	Nominated	
2016	National Film Awards UK	Best Supporting Actor	Macbeth	Nominated	
2017	National Film Awards UK	Best Supporting Actor	Trespass Against Us	Nominated	
2018	Brooklyn Horror Film Festival	Best Actor	Possum	Won	
2022	AACTA Awards	Best Supporting Actor	The Stranger	Won	
2023	AACTA Awards	Best Supporting Actor (International)	The Stranger	Nominated	
2023	Film Critics Circle of Australia	Best Supporting Actor	The Stranger	Won	
