= '71 (film) =

2014 British film by Yann Demange

- UK release poster
- Directed by: Yann Demange
- Written by: Gregory Burke
- Produced by: Angus Lamont; Robin Gutch
- Starring: Jack O'Connell; Paul Anderson; Richard Dormer; Sean Harris; Martin McCann; Charlie Murphy; Sam Reid; Killian Scott; David Wilmot
- Cinematography: Tat Radcliffe
- Edited by: Chris Wyatt
- Music by: David Holmes
- Production companies: Crab Apple Films; Warp Films
- Distributed by: StudioCanal
- Release dates: 7 February 2014 (Berlin Film Festival); 10 October 2014 (United Kingdom)
- Running time: 99 minutes
- Country: United Kingdom
- Language: English
- Budget: £8.1 million
- Box office: $3.1 million

'71 is a 2014 British thriller film directed by Yann Demange (in his feature directorial debut) and written by Gregory Burke. Set in Northern Ireland, it stars Jack O'Connell, Sean Harris, David Wilmot, Richard Dormer, Barry Keoghan, Paul Anderson and Charlie Murphy, and tells the fictional story of a British soldier who becomes separated from his unit during a riot in Belfast at the height of the Troubles in 1971. Filming began on location in Blackburn, Lancashire, in April 2013 and continued in Sheffield, Leeds and Liverpool. The film was funded by the British Film Institute, Film4, Creative Scotland and Screen Yorkshire, and had its premiere in the competition section of the 64th Berlin International Film Festival, held in February 2014, where it was particularly praised for O'Connell's performance and Demange's direction.

== Plot ==
Gary Hook, a new recruit to the British Army, is sent to Belfast in 1971 during the early years of the Troubles. Under the leadership of the inexperienced Second Lieutenant Armitage, his platoon is deployed without protective gear to a volatile area where Irish Catholics (largely Republicans) and Ulster Protestants (largely Loyalists) live side by side. The unit provides support for the Royal Ulster Constabulary as it inspects homes for firearms, shocking Hook with their rough treatment of Catholic civilians. A crowd gathers to protest against the search; the soldiers, who were ordered to leave riot gear behind, are ordered to keep the crowd back, but the latter turn violent when they witness the RUC beating homeowners in the street.

One soldier is hit by a rock and drops his L1A1 rifle to the ground. In the confusion, a young boy seizes it and runs off through the mob. Hook and another soldier, Thompson, pursue him. As the crowd's protest escalates, the soldiers and police pull out, leaving the two soldiers behind. Hook and Thompson are severely beaten and disarmed by a mob, until a sympathetic woman manages to intervene. However, Thompson is suddenly shot dead at point-blank range by a Provisional IRA gunman, Paul Haggerty. Hook flees through streets and back alleys and hides in an outhouse until dark.

After Hook leaves, he wanders into the Shankill Estate. A foul-mouthed Protestant youngster takes Hook to a local pub that serves as a front for Loyalists. There, Hook glimpses a Loyalist group in a back room constructing a bomb under the guidance of Sergeant Lewis, a member of the Military Reaction Force (MRF), the British Army's covert counter-insurgency unit. Hook steps outside the pub just before the bomb prematurely detonates and destroys the building, killing and injuring many of those inside, including the young boy. Unaware that the Loyalist bombers have blown themselves up accidentally, the Provisional IRA and Official IRA factions accuse each other of being responsible for the bombing.

Hook staggers away and again gets lost in the streets, eventually collapsing. Two Catholics, Eamon and his daughter Brigid, discover him as he lies in a street unconscious and injured by shrapnel. They take him to their home in the Divis Flats. Eamon, a former army medic, stitches Hook's wounds. Despite the Provisional IRA having recently taken control of the area from the OIRA, Eamon contacts senior OIRA officer Boyle for help, expecting a more humane solution than the Provisional IRA faction would allow. Boyle, less radical and violent than the younger Provisional IRA members, tells Captain Browning, leader of the local MRF section, of Hook's whereabouts and asks in return that Browning kill James Quinn, a key leader of the younger Provisional IRA faction.

Quinn and his squad have tailed Boyle since the pub explosion and saw him visit Eamon's flat without knowing why he was there. Sensing danger, Hook flees the flat, taking a large knife he finds in a bag. Hook eludes Quinn's men but, unable to evade Haggerty, stabs and kills him. Quinn's group captures Hook and takes him to a hideout. Quinn orders Sean, the young boy who, in the early neighbourhood persecution, had hesitated to kill Hook, to murder him. When Sean hesitates, Quinn prepares to execute Hook, only to leave when Browning's group arrives. Sergeant Lewis of Browning's group shoots Sean, to Hook's horror. Lewis then attempts to strangle Hook to prevent him from informing others about the bomb. As Lieutenant Armitage and his men enter in support of Browning, Armitage sees Lewis's attempt to kill Hook. Sean, having survived the first shot, raises himself and shoots Lewis dead, before being shot again, this time fatally by Armitage. Browning finds Quinn and, rather than arresting or executing him, tells him Boyle wants him dead and needs to be dealt with. As Quinn leaves, Browning tells him he will be in touch soon.

Hook is returned to his barracks. Later, despite a formal complaint by Armitage, the commanding officer dismisses the incident involving Hook, Lewis and Sean as 'a confused situation' that merits no further inquiry. Hook returns to England, throwing his dog tags from the ferry, and is reunited with his younger brother, whom he had left behind in a care home. The pair leave on a bus, presumably to start a new life for themselves, away from war and conflict.

== Cast ==
- Jack O'Connell as Private Gary Hook
- Richard Dormer as Eamon
- Charlie Murphy as Brigid
- David Wilmot as Boyle
- Sean Harris as Captain Sandy Browning
- Killian Scott as James Quinn
- Sam Reid as Second Lieutenant Armitage
- Barry Keoghan as Sean Bannon
- Paul Anderson as Sergeant Leslie Lewis
- Jack Lowden as Private "Thommo" Thompson
- Adam Nagaitis as Jimmy
- Martin McCann as Paul Haggerty
- Babou Ceesay as Corporal
- James McArdle as Sergeant Mark McGowen
- Corey McKinley as Billy (Loyalist child)
- Paul Popplewell as Training Corporal
- Amy Molloy as Mother in Raided House
- Valene Kane as Orla (Spitting Girl)
- Harry Verity as Darren

== Reception ==
Rotten Tomatoes, a review aggregator, reports that 96% of 138 surveyed critics have given the film a positive review; the average rating is 7.80/10. The website's critical consensus reads: "Powerfully directed and acted, '71 stays true to its fact-based origins while remaining as gripping as any solidly crafted action thriller." On Metacritic it has a score of 83 out of 100 based on 33 reviews, indicating "universal acclaim".

Writing for the Los Angeles Times, Kenneth Turan called '71 "a tense thriller from Britain that so adroitly joins physical intensity, emotional authenticity and political acuity that you may find yourself forgetting to take a breath." Manohla Dargis of The New York Times singled out Jack O'Connell for praise, saying, "Mr. O'Connell runs away with '71, in which his character's every emotional, psychological and physical hurdle makes for kinetic cinema." The Hollywood Reporter critic Leslie Felperin noted of Yann Demange's direction, "A big part of [Demange's] achievement resides in the casting of such a veteran crew of character actors in the first place, but credit is due for coaxing such subtle performances." Jonathan Romney in Film Comment praised the originality of the film, "a rare hybrid between hard-nosed realism, on the cusp of a quasi-documentary style, and genre thriller-adventure", while criticising the opening and closing scenes as conventional.

=== Accolades ===
'71 won Best Director at the 2014 British Independent Film Awards, after receiving nine nominations.

The National Board of Review named '71 one of the top 10 independent films of 2015.

Award	Date of ceremony	Category	Recipients	Result
British Independent Film Awards	7 December 2014	Best British Independent Film	'71	Nominated
British Independent Film Awards	7 December 2014	Best Director	Yann Demange	Won
British Independent Film Awards	7 December 2014	Best Actor	Jack O'Connell	Nominated
British Independent Film Awards	7 December 2014	Best Supporting Actor	Sean Harris	Nominated
British Independent Film Awards	7 December 2014	Best Screenplay	Gregory Burke	Nominated
British Independent Film Awards	7 December 2014	Best Technical Achievement	Chris Wyatt (Editing)	Nominated
British Independent Film Awards	7 December 2014	Best Technical Achievement	Tat Radcliffe (Cinematography)	Nominated
British Independent Film Awards	7 December 2014	Best Achievement in Production	'71	Nominated
British Independent Film Awards	7 December 2014	The Douglas Hickox Award for Debut Director	Yann Demange	Nominated
