= Traders (film) =

2015 Irish film

- Theatrical film poster
- Directed by: Rachael Moriarty; Peter Murphy
- Written by: Rachael Moriarty; Peter Murphy
- Produced by: Libby Durdy; Rachel Lysaght; Stuart Switzer
- Starring: Killian Scott; John Bradley; Nika McGuigan; Barry Keoghan; Peter O'Meara; Aoibhinn McGinnity
- Cinematography: Peter Robertson
- Edited by: Joe McElwaine; Alastair Reid
- Release dates: July 11, 2015 (Galway); March 11, 2016 (Ireland); July 29, 2016 (UK)
- Running time: 90 mins.
- Country: Ireland
- Language: English

Traders is a 2015 Irish thriller film, written and directed by Rachael Moriarty and Peter Murphy. It stars Killian Scott, John Bradley, Nika McGuigan, Barry Keoghan, Peter O'Meara, David Murray, Caoilfhionn Dunne, Olwen Fouéré, Dónall Ó Héalai, and Laurence Kinlan. It premiered at the 2015 Galway Film Fleadh, and was subsequently released in Ireland and the UK the following year.

== Plot ==
Harry Fox and John Stynes have both been laid off from lucrative jobs. Harry is in danger of apartment repossession until John concocts an idea called "trading", in which people fight to the death to earn the loser's life savings. Harry cannot bring himself to kill John, but John attempts to kill Harry only to stab himself in the shoulder. Harry brings John back to his apartment for convalescence, and his neighbor Orla (whom John is in love with) tracks him down. She and Harry begin a relationship secretly, while Harry all the while continues to increase his kills and savings. John, bitter at losing money, decides to become an agent to Ken, the florist's son. This all culminates in a final showdown.

== Cast ==
- Killian Scott as Harry Fox
- John Bradley as Vernon Stynes
- Nika McGuigan as Orla Johnson
- Barry Keoghan as Ken Grogan
- Peter O'Meara as Anthony Grogan
- Aoibhinn McGinnity as Nuala
- David Murray as Kevin
- Caoilfhionn Dunne as Vicious
- Olwen Fouéré as Helen Stynes
- Tom Davis as Big John
- Dónall Ó Héalai as Kicker
- Donal O'Farrell as Pickaxe
- David McSavage as Tallman
- Nick Lee as Simon
- Laurence Kinlan as Ger
- Patrick McDonnell as Tony
- Mary O'Driscoll as Sally
- Tom Sullivan as Bri234

== Reception ==
On the review aggregator website Rotten Tomatoes, 82% of 11 critics' reviews are positive, with an average rating of 6.10/10.

Peter Bradshaw of The Guardian lauds this as "an ingenious satirical thriller". The staff at The Hollywood Reporter say "Though its recipe of anxious misanthropy doesn’t crackle from the start, the picture builds steadily to an end so satisfying it could well generate fest buzz and lead to an art house run."

Brian Lloyd of Entertainment.ie gives it 3/5 stars and compliments the cast including lead Killian Scott, additionally stating "There's never been an Irish John Carpenter or Wes Craven to take on the underbelly of Irish society, but Traders is a decent shot at it." Colm Quinn of Film Ireland says "John Bradley steals the show…He is a weasel, a snake, and bloody brilliant."

Slightly less enthusiastic, Jason Coyle of Scannain rates it 2.6/5, suggesting that the film "passes the time harmlessly enough—Just don't expect it to live long in the memory afterwards".
