= British Independent Film Awards 2014 =

British film awards ceremony

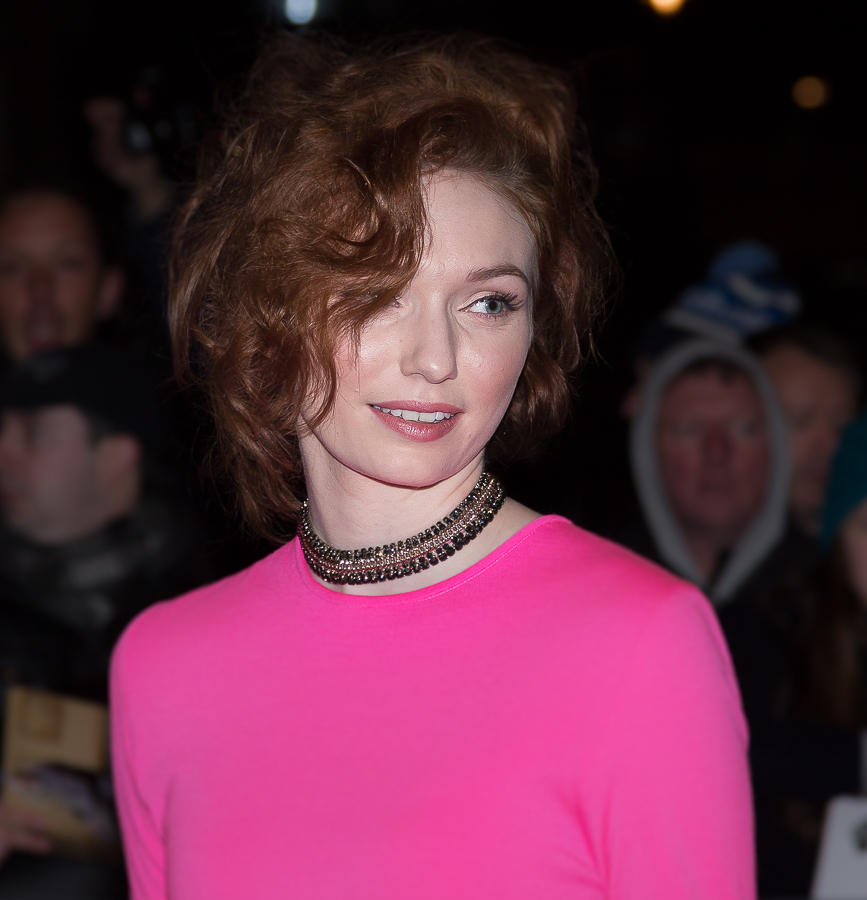
Eleanor Tomlinson at the British Independent Film Awards 2014

The 17th British Independent Film Awards were held on 7 December 2014 in London. The awards honoured the best British independent films of 2014.

== Awards ==
=== Best British Independent Film ===
- Pride
- '71
- Calvary
- Mr. Turner
- The Imitation Game

=== Best Director ===
- Yann Demange - '71
- John Michael McDonagh - Calvary
- Lenny Abrahamson - Frank
- Matthew Warchus - Pride
- Mike Leigh - Mr. Turner

=== Best Actress ===
- Gugu Mbatha-Raw - Belle
- Alicia Vikander - Testament of Youth
- Cheng Pei-pei - Lilting
- Keira Knightley - The Imitation Game
- Sameena Jabeen Ahmed - Catch Me Daddy

=== Best Actor ===
- Brendan Gleeson - Calvary
- Asa Butterfield - X+Y
- Benedict Cumberbatch - The Imitation Game
- Jack O'Connell - '71
- Timothy Spall - Mr. Turner

=== Best Supporting Actress ===
- Imelda Staunton - Pride
- Dorothy Atkinson - Mr. Turner
- Maggie Gyllenhaal - Frank
- Sally Hawkins - X+Y
- Sienna Guillory - The Goob

=== Best Supporting Actor ===
- Andrew Scott - Pride
- Ben Schnetzer - Pride
- Michael Fassbender - Frank
- Rafe Spall - X+Y
- Sean Harris - '71

=== Most Promising Newcomer ===
- Sameena Jabeen Ahmed - Catch Me Daddy
- Ben Schnetzer - Pride
- Cara Delevingne - The Face of an Angel
- Gugu Mbatha-Raw - Belle
- Liam Walpole - The Goob

=== The Douglas Hickox Award ===
Given to a British director on their debut feature.

- Iain Forsyth and Jane Pollard - 20,000 Days on Earth
- Daniel Wolfe, Matthew Wolfe - Catch Me Daddy
- Hong Khaou - Lilting
- Morgan Matthews - X+Y
- Yann Demange - '71

=== Best Screenplay ===
- Jon Ronson, Peter Straughan - Frank
- Graham Moore - The Imitation Game
- Gregory Burke - '71
- John Michael McDonagh - Calvary
- Stephen Beresford - Pride

=== Best Achievement in Production ===
- The Goob
- '71
- 20,000 Days on Earth
- Catch Me Daddy
- Lilting

=== Best Technical Achievement ===
- Stephen Rennicks - Frank (Music)
- Chris Wyatt - '71 (Editing)
- Dick Pope - Mr. Turner (Cinematography)
- Robbie Ryan - Catch Me Daddy (Cinematography)
- Tat Radcliffe - '71 (Cinematography)

=== Best Documentary ===
- Next Goal Wins
- 20,000 Days on Earth
- Night Will Fall
- The Possibilities are Endless
- Virunga

=== Best Foreign Independent Film ===
- Boyhood
- Blue Ruin
- Fruitvale Station
- Ida
- The Babadook

=== The Raindance Award ===
- Luna
- Flim: The Movie...
- Gregor
- Keeping Rosy
- The Beat Beneath My Feet

=== Best Short Film ===
- The Kárman Line
- Crocodile
- Emotional Fusebox
- Keeping up with the Joneses
- Slap

=== The Variety Award ===
- Benedict Cumberbatch
