= Robbie Ryan (cinematographer) =

Irish cinematographer (born 1970)

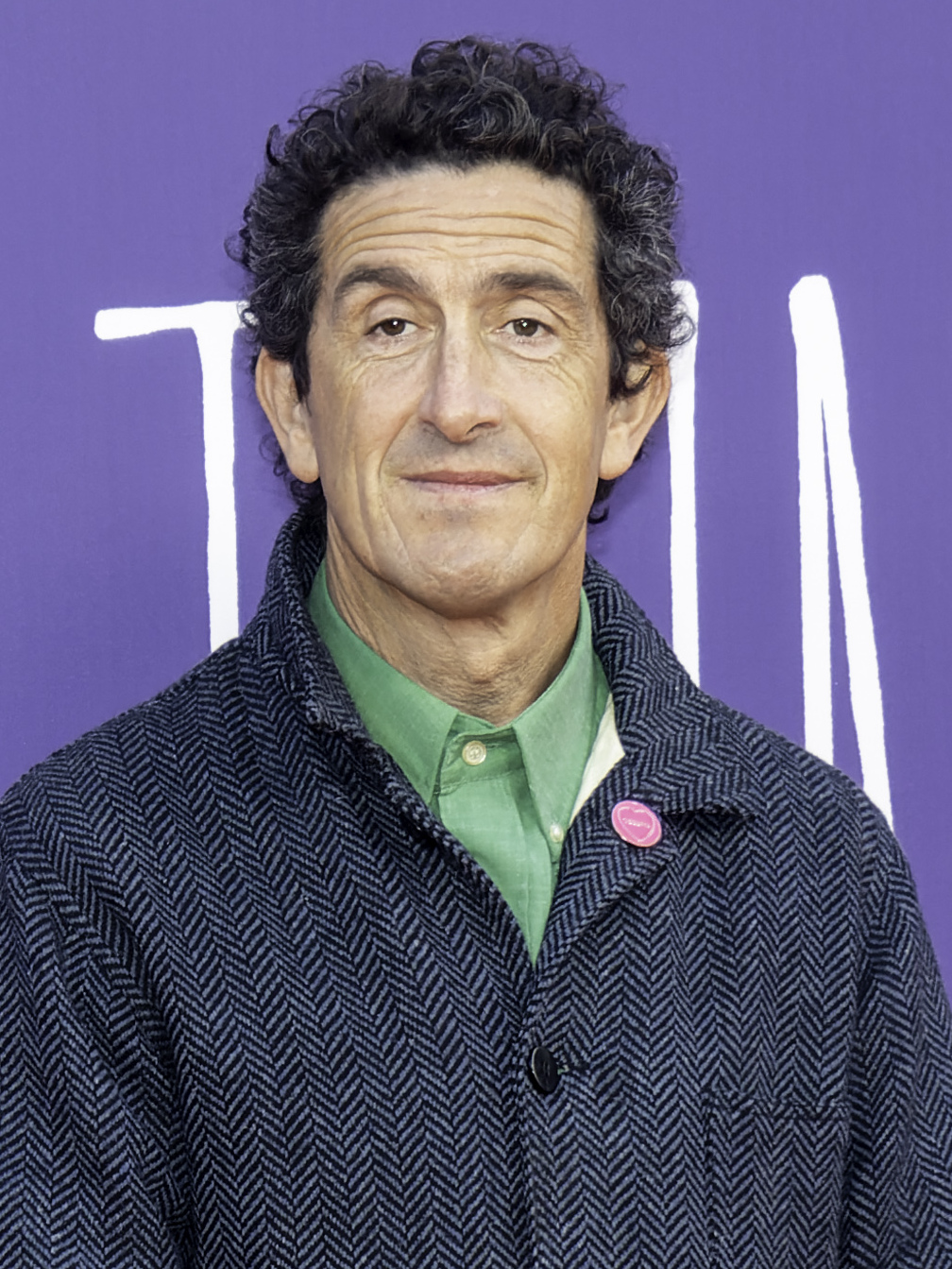
- Ryan in 2023
- Born: 1970 (age 55–56); Dublin, Ireland
- Education: IADT
- Occupation: Cinematographer
- Years active: c. 1990–present
- Organization: British Society of Cinematographers (BSC)
- Known for: Poor Things (2023); Marriage Story (2019); The Favourite (2018); American Honey (2016); I, Daniel Blake (2016); Philomena (2013); Fish Tank (2009)

Robbie Ryan (born 1970) is an Irish cinematographer whose work spans over 106 film projects, including feature-length, short films, commercials, and music videos. He is most known for his collaborations with film auteurs such as Andrea Arnold, Sally Potter, Stephen Frears, Ken Loach, Noah Baumbach, Yorgos Lanthimos, and Mike Mills.

He received Academy Award nominations for Best Cinematography for Yorgos Lanthimos' The Favourite (2018) and Poor Things (2023).

== Early life and education ==
Ryan was born in Sandymount, on the southside of Dublin City. At the age of 14, he decided he wanted to be a cinematographer. He attended and graduated the Dún Laoghaire Institute of Art, Design and Technology.

== Career ==
Ryan is a frequent collaborator on Andrea Arnold's films, including Wasp, Red Road, Fish Tank, Wuthering Heights and American Honey.

He has worked with Ken Loach on the films The Angels' Share, Jimmy's Hall, and I, Daniel Blake. He served as the director of photography on films including Philomena, Slow West and The Favourite, the latter of which earned him a nomination for the Academy Award for Best Cinematography at the 91st Academy Awards.

== Filmography ==
=== Feature film ===
Key
†	Denotes films that have not yet been released

Year	Title	Director	Notes
1997	How to Cheat in the Leaving Certificate	Graham Jones	
2001	Large	Justin Edgar	
2002	This Is Not a Love Song	Bille Eltringham	
2005	Isolation	Billy O'Brien	
2006	Red Road	Andrea Arnold	
2006	Mischief Night	Penny Woolcock	
2007	Brick Lane	Sarah Gavron	
2009	Fish Tank	Andrea Arnold	
2009	The Scouting Book for Boys	Tom Harper	
2010	Patagonia	Marc Evans	
2011	Wuthering Heights	Andrea Arnold	
2012	The Angels' Share	Ken Loach	
2012	Ginger & Rosa	Sally Potter	
2013	The Last Days on Mars	Ruairí Robinson	
2013	Philomena	Stephen Frears	
2014	Catch Me Daddy	Daniel Wolfe; Matthew Wolfe	
2014	Jimmy's Hall	Ken Loach	
2015	Slow West	John Maclean	
2016	I, Daniel Blake	Ken Loach	
2016	American Honey	Andrea Arnold	
2016	I Am Not a Serial Killer	Billy O'Brien	
2017	The Meyerowitz Stories	Noah Baumbach	
2018	The Favourite	Yorgos Lanthimos	
2019	Sorry We Missed You	Ken Loach	
2019	Marriage Story	Noah Baumbach	
2020	The Roads Not Taken	Sally Potter	
2021	C'mon C'mon	Mike Mills	
2021	The Afterlight	Charlie Shackleton	
2022	Medusa Deluxe	Thomas Hardiman	
2023	The Old Oak	Ken Loach	
2023	Poor Things	Yorgos Lanthimos	
2024	Kinds of Kindness	Yorgos Lanthimos	
2024	Bird	Andrea Arnold	
2025	Tornado	John Maclean	
2025	Bugonia	Yorgos Lanthimos	
2026	A Talent for Murder	Anton Corbijn	

=== Short film ===
Year	Title	Director	Notes
2003	Wasp	Andrea Arnold	
2005	Toz	Fatih Kizilgok	
2005	Antonio's Breakfast	Daniel Mulloy	
2007	Son	Daniel Mulloy	
2008	The German	Nick Ryan	

TV movie

Year	Title	Director
2010	I Am Slave	Gabriel Range

Documentary film

Year	Title	Director	Notes
2012	The Summit	Nick Ryan	With Fredrik Sträng
2022	This Much I Know to Be True	Andrew Dominik	

=== Other ===
Concert film

Year	Title	Director
2020	Idiot Prayer	Himself

Music video

Year	Title	Artist	Director	Ref.
2022	"Hypnotized"	Sophie Ellis-Bextor & Wuh Oh	Sophie Muller	
2025	"Stay on Me"	Sophie Ellis-Bextor	Sophie Muller	
2026	Fabulous	MEEK	Sophie Muller & Theo Adams	

== Awards and nominations ==
Academy Awards

Year	Category	Title	Result
2019	Best Cinematography	The Favourite	Nominated
2024	Best Cinematography	Poor Things	Nominated

Alliance of Women Film Journalists

Year	Category	Title	Result
2019	Best Cinematography	The Favourite	Nominated
2024	Best Cinematography	Poor Things	Nominated

American Society of Cinematographers

Year	Category	Title	Result
2019	Outstanding Achievement in Theatrical Releases	The Favourite	Nominated
2024	Outstanding Achievement in Theatrical Releases	Poor Things	Nominated

Austin Film Critics Association

Year	Category	Title	Result
2024	Best Cinematography	Poor Things	Nominated

Boston Society of Film Critics

Year	Category	Title	Result
2023	Best Cinematography	Poor Things	Runner-up

British Academy Film Awards

Year	Category	Title	Result
2019	Best Cinematography	The Favourite	Nominated
2024	Best Cinematography	Poor Things	Nominated

British Independent Film Awards

Year	Category	Title	Result
2009	Best Technical Achievement	Fish Tank	Nominated
2012	Best Technical Achievement	Ginger & Rosa	Nominated
2014	Best Technical Achievement	Catch Me Daddy	Nominated
2016	Best Technical Achievement	American Honey	Won
2018	Best Cinematography	The Favourite	Won

British Society of Cinematographers

Year	Category	Title	Result
2019	Best Cinematography in a Theatrical Feature Film	The Favorite	Nominated
2024	Best Cinematography in a Theatrical Feature Film	Poor Things	Won

Camerimage

Year	Category	Title	Result
2010	Best Cinematography in a Music Video	Plan B: Prayin'	Nominated
2011	Golden Frog	Wuthering Heights	Nominated
2011	Bronze Frog	Wuthering Heights	Won
2012	Best Cinematography in a Music Video	The Shoes: Time to Dance	Nominated
2014	Best Cinematography in a Music Video	Paolo Nutini: Iron Sky	Won
2018	Golden Frog	The Favourite	Nominated
2018	Audience Award	The Favourite	Won
2021	Golden Frog	C'mon C'mon	Won
2021	Audience Award	C'mon C'mon	Won
2023	Golden Frog	Poor Things	Nominated
2023	Bronze Frog	Poor Things	Won
2023	Audience Award	Poor Things	Won

Chicago Film Critics Association

Year	Category	Title	Result
2018	Best Cinematography	The Favourite	Nominated
2023	Best Cinematography	Poor Things	Nominated

Critics' Choice Awards

Year	Category	Title	Result
2019	Best Cinematography	The Favourite	Nominated
2024	Best Cinematography	Poor Things	Nominated

Dallas–Fort Worth Film Critics Association

Year	Category	Title	Result
2018	Best Cinematography	The Favourite	Runner-up

Dublin Film Critics' Circle

Year	Category	Title	Result
2019	Best Cinematography	Marriage Story	7th place
2019	Best Cinematography	The Favourite	8th place

European Film Awards

Year	Category	Title	Result
2019	Best Cinematographer	The Favorite	Won

Evening Standard British Film Awards

Year	Category	Title	Result
2012	Technical Achievement Award	Wuthering Heights	Won
2017	Technical Achievement Award	American Honey	Nominated

Florida Film Critics Circle

Year	Category	Title	Result
2018	Best Cinematography	The Favourite	Nominated
2023	Best Cinematography	Poor Things	Nominated

Georgia Film Critics Association

Year	Category	Title	Result
2019	Best Cinematography	The Favourite	Nominated
2024	Best Cinematography	Poor Things	Nominated

Hollywood Creative Alliance
(Astra Film and Creative Arts Awards)

Year	Category	Title	Result
2024	Best Cinematography	Poor Things	Nominated

Houston Film Critics Society

Year	Category	Title	Result
2019	Best Cinematography	The Favourite	Nominated
2024	Best Cinematography	Poor Things	Nominated

Independent Spirit Awards

Year	Category	Title	Result
2017	Best Cinematography	American Honey	Nominated

IndieWire Critics Poll

Year	Category	Title	Result
2016	Best Cinematography	American Honey	6th place
2023	Best Cinematography	Poor Things	Runner-up

Irish Film & Television Awards

Year	Category	Title	Result
2007	Best Cinematography	Isolation	Nominated
2012	Best Cinematography	Wuthering Heights	Nominated
2017	Best Cinematography	American Honey	Nominated
2020	Best Cinematography	Marriage Story	Nominated

London Film Critics' Circle

Year	Category	Title	Result
2012	Technical Achievement Award	Wuthering Heights	Nominated
2017	Technical Achievement Award	American Honey	Nominated

Los Angeles Film Critics Association

Year	Category	Title	Result
2023	Best Cinematography	Poor Things	Won

MTV Video Music Awards

Year	Category	Title	Result
2006	Best Cinematography	James Blunt: You're Beautiful	Won

Online Film Critics Society

Year	Category	Title	Result
2019	Best Cinematography	The Favourite	Nominated
2024	Best Cinematography	Poor Things	Nominated

San Diego Film Critics Society

Year	Category	Title	Result
2023	Best Cinematography	Poor Things	Nominated

San Francisco Bay Area Film Critics Circle

Year	Category	Title	Result
2018	Best Cinematography	The Favourite	Nominated
2024	Best Cinematography	Poor Things	Nominated

Satellite Awards

Year	Category	Title	Result
2019	Best Cinematography	The Favourite	Nominated
2022	Best Cinematography	C'mon C'mon	Nominated

Seattle Film Critics Society

Year	Category	Title	Result
2018	Best Cinematography	The Favourite	Nominated
2024	Best Cinematography	Poor Things	Won

St. Louis Film Critics Association

Year	Category	Title	Result
2018	Best Cinematography	The Favourite	Nominated

Venice Film Festival

Year	Category	Title	Result
2011	Golden Osella for Outstanding Technical Contribution	Wuthering Heights	Won

Washington D.C. Area Film Critics Association

Year	Category	Title	Result
2018	Best Cinematography	The Favourite	Nominated
2023	Best Cinematography	Poor Things	Nominated
