= Killian Scott =

Irish actor

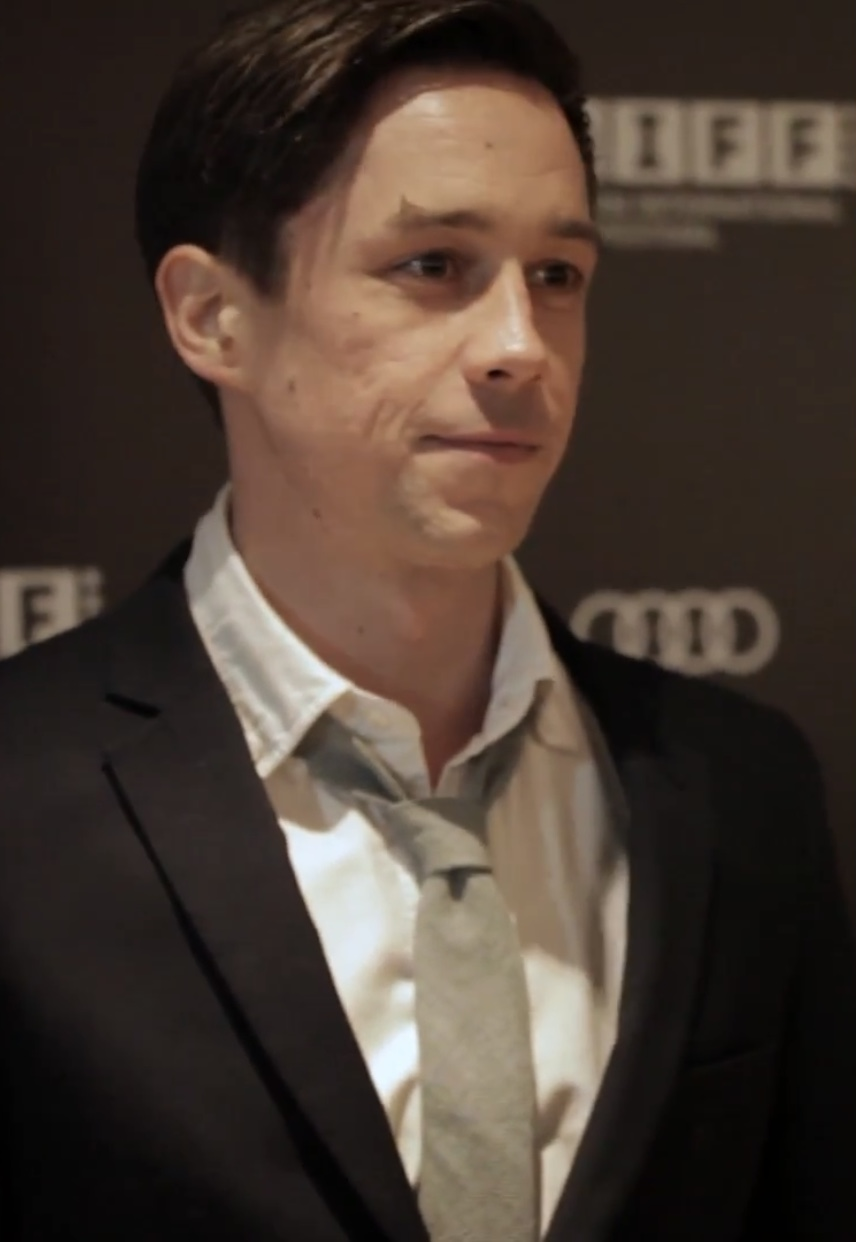
- Scott at the 2016 Dublin International Film Festival
- Born: Cillian Damien Murphy; Sandymount, Dublin, Ireland
- Education: University College Dublin
- Occupation: Actor
- Years active: 2000–present
- Relatives: Eoghan Murphy (brother)

Cillian Damien Murphy, known professionally as Killian Scott, is an Irish actor. He first came to prominence for his role as Tommy in the RTÉ One series Love/Hate (2010–2014). He appears as Orpheus in the 2024 Netflix series Kaos, and plays Commander Noah Pierson in the third series of The Capture on the BBC in 2026.

== Early life and education ==
Killian Scott was born as Cillian Damien Murphy. The youngest of six children, he grew up in Sandymount, Dublin, and attended St Michael's College, a private school on the exclusive Ailesbury Road in Dublin 4. His siblings include former politician Eoghan Murphy and playwright Colin Murphy.

His interest in acting was inspired by his brother Eoghan's performance in a school production of Hamlet. He studied English and philosophy at University College Dublin before moving to London to study at the Drama Centre.

== Career ==
Initially starting out in theatre, he changed his name to Killian Scott to avoid confusion with Cillian Murphy, another Irish actor. He gained fame in Ireland for the role of Tommy in Love/Hate, which first started airing in 2010. During the next few years, Scott appeared in small roles in films including '71 and Calvary, as well as starring in 2013's Black Ice.

After Love/Hate finished, Scott appeared in his first lead role in Irish thriller film Traders in 2015. Scott joined Ripper Street for series four and five in 2016, portraying Assistant Commissioner Augustus Dove. The same year, he appeared in Trespass Against Us.

In 2017 he appeared in Strike as D.I. Eric Wardle. The same year, he was cast as the lead in Damnation, replacing Aden Young, who departed the show due to creative differences. The series was picked up by USA Network in June 2017, with filming beginning the following month. In January 2018, Damnation was cancelled after its first season. He starred in The Commuter with Liam Neeson in 2018, and described the film as a "genuine career highlight".

In 2019 Scott starred alongside Sarah Greene in Dublin Murders, based on the Dublin Murder Squad book series by Tana French. He portrayed lead character Detective Rob Reilly and adopted an English accent for the role. The series was filmed in Belfast and Dublin over seven months.

In April 2021 Scott was cast in the Disney+ series Secret Invasion, set in the Marvel Cinematic Universe.

In 2026 Scott played Commander Noah Pierson in Season 3 of the BBC TV Series The Capture.

== Filmography ==
=== Film ===
Year	Title	Role	Notes
2007	Creatures of Knowledge	Matt	
2008	Christian Blake	Guard 2	Uncredited
2009	The Rise of the Bricks	Luke	Also writer
2012	The Tragedy of Macbeth	Banquo	Direct-to-DVD
2013	The Rafters	Jonathan	
2013	Good Vibrations	Ronnie Matthews	
2013	Black Ice	Jimmy Devlin	Main role
2014	Calvary	Milo Herlihy	
2014	'71	James Quinn	
2014	Get Up & Go	Coilin	Main role
2015	Traders	Harry Fox	Main role
2016	Trespass Against Us	Kenny	
2018	The Commuter	Dylan	

=== Television ===
Year	Title	Role	Notes
2010	Single-Handed	James Kerrigan	3 episodes
2010–2014	Love/Hate	Tommy Daly	Main role
2011–2016	Jack Taylor	Cody Farraher	Main role
2014	Call the Midwife	Declan Doyle	Episode #3.6
2014	Siblings	Bryn	Episode: "Burrito Neighbours"
2016	Ripper Street	Asst. Commissioner Augustus Dove	Series 4–5
2017–2018	Strike	D.I. Eric Wardle	Recurring role
2017–2018	Damnation	Seth Davenport	Main role
2019	Dublin Murders	Detective Rob Reilly	Main role
2023	Secret Invasion	Pagon	Miniseries, main role
2024	Kaos	Orpheus	Main role
2026	The Capture	Commander Noah Pierson	Main role

== Stage ==
Year	Title	Role	Venue	Playwright	Ref
2023	Hangmen	Mooney	Gaiety Theatre, Dublin	Martin McDonagh	
