= Stephen Rennicks =

Irish composer

- Occupations: Musician; Film score composer
- Awards: British Independent Film Award for Best Technical Achievement – Music; Irish Film & Television Award for Best Music

Stephen Rennicks is an Irish musician and film score composer based in Dublin.

== Early life ==
As a boy, Rennicks predominantly listened to and sang what he described as "Irish Protestant Baptist gospel music, choruses and hymns", and later claimed it was an influence on his process of learning harmony. During the later years of the 1980s, Rennicks was a member of a band called the Prunes, which traveled through nightclubs in France and Germany playing punk music.

== Career ==
Rennicks worked with director Lenny Abrahamson on What Richard Did (2012). For Abrahamson, he later served as music director for the 2014 film Frank, where he was tasked to write songs that were a hybrid of pop and experimental rock music. Rennicks was inspired by musicians he met while in the Prunes, wrote the score and supervised the recordings of his original songs. For Frank, Rennicks won the award for Best Technical Achievement – Music at the 2014 British Independent Film Awards, and was nominated for Original Score at the 12th Irish Film & Television Awards.

Abrahamson and Rennicks collaborated again on the 2015 film Room. As a Canadian co-production, Rennicks was nominated for the Canadian Screen Award for Best Score in January 2016. In April, he then won for Original Music at the 13th Irish Film & Television Awards.

== Awards and nominations ==
Year	Award	Category	Work	Result	Ref
2004	Irish Film & Television Awards	Best Original Score	Adam & Paul	Nominated	
2008	Irish Film & Television Awards	Best Original Score	Garage	Nominated	
2011	Maverick Movie Awards	Best Original Score: Short	The Pipe	Won	
2013	Irish Film & Television Awards	Best Original Score	What Richard Did	Nominated	
2014	British Independent Film Awards	Best Technical Achievement	Frank	Won	
2014	Les Arcs Film Festival	Best Music	Frank	Won	
2014	Las Vegas Film Critics Society	Best Song	"I Love You All" from Frank	Won	
2015	Seattle Film Critics	Best Original Song	"I Love You All" from Frank	Nominated	(Note: Shared with Lenny Abrahamson.)
2015	Chlotrudis Awards	Best Use of Music in a Film	Frank	Nominated	
2015	Irish Film & Television Awards	Best Original Score	Frank	Nominated	
2016	Canadian Screen Awards	Achievement in Music – Original Score	Room	Nominated	
2016	Irish Film & Television Awards	Best Original Score	Room	Won	
2016	Irish Film & Television Awards	Best Original Score	Viva	Nominated	
2018	Irish Film & Television Awards	Best Original Score	Maze	Nominated	
2020	Irish Film & Television Awards	Best Original Score	The Little Stranger	Nominated	
2020	Irish Film & Television Awards	Best Original Score	Rosie	Nominated	
2021	Irish Film & Television Awards	Best Original Score	Normal People	Nominated	
2022	Irish Film & Television Awards	Best Original Score	An Cailín Ciúin	Won	
