= Isolation (2005 film) =

- Directed by: Billy O'Brien
- Written by: Billy O'Brien
- Starring: John Lynch; Essie Davis; Sean Harris; Marcel Iureș; Ruth Negga; Stanley Townsend
- Cinematography: Robbie Ryan
- Edited by: Justinian Buckley
- Music by: Adrian Johnston
- Production companies: Film Four; Lions Gate Films; The Irish Film Board
- Distributed by: Lions Gate Films
- Release date: September 11, 2005 (TIFF)
- Running time: 95 minutes
- Country: Ireland
- Language: English

Isolation is a 2005 Irish science fiction horror film directed and written by Billy O'Brien and produced by Film Four and Lions Gate Films.

== Plot ==
Dan Reilly, who owns a failing farm in rural Ireland, is being paid by a bio-genetics firm to assist in some experiments to make faster-growing cattle. The firm sends Orla, a local veterinarian, to inspect the cows and ensure the experiment is running smoothly. While performing a palpation, Orla is seemingly bitten by the unborn calf. She informs John, a genetic scientist from the firm, but he dismisses her concerns. John also informs Dan of a caravan parked near his farm and reminds him that the experiment is supposed to be kept secret from the public. Dan goes out and speaks to the inhabitants, Traveller Jamie and his girlfriend Mary, and tells them they must leave by morning. That same night, one of the cows goes into a difficult labour. Dan is forced to seek Jamie's help and together, they successfully birth the calf, which bites Dan. In gratitude, Dan allows Jamie and Mary, who are on the run from her brothers who disapprove of her relationship with a Traveller, to stay on his farm.

The next day, Orla returns to inspect the calf and is shocked to find it has fangs. When Orla decides to terminate the calf, its mother aggressively comes to its defence and Orla is forced to kill them both. She performs a necropsy on the calf and discovers that it was somehow pregnant with six foetuses, all of which are extremely deformed and have their skeletons growing outside their bodies. Dan and Orla argue and fail to notice when one of the foetuses escapes.

The next morning, while feeding one of the cows, Jamie notices several strange wounds on its lower body. When he passes through some shallow water in the barn, something bites him. Shortly after, a police officer arrives at the farm and informs Dan that Orla is missing. Later that night, John returns to check on the experiments and learns about the malformed foetuses. While inspecting them, he discovers that their cells are multiplying extremely quickly. Inside their caravan, Mary notices unusual behaviour from Jamie as they have sex. They are later awoken by a creature crawling in their bed, but it escapes. John informs them that the entire farm must be quarantined as the creature can infect other cows and cause a pandemic.

They begin searching for the creature but find that it is hiding in the murky water that is flooding the farm. Dan attempts to force it out of hiding with his tractor, but instead finds Orla's body in the water. John takes her body to the lab and finds foreign material inside a wound on her abdomen. The material displays the same extreme cell growth from before, but now also containing human cells. He realises that humans are also susceptible to infection. Jamie, realising he is infected, attempts to escape, but John kills him. When Dan and Mary come outside to investigate, they find that John has killed almost every cow on the farm in search of the creature. He explains that the creature has been hiding inside the cows like a parasite, eating them from the inside and growing larger.

They go to the barn where the final cow is being kept, but find that the calf has already been born and escaped. A violent argument breaks out between John and Dan. John is attacked and killed by the creature while chasing a fleeing Mary. She runs into Dan, who survived the earlier fight with John. They continue searching for the creature and the missing calf. Mary finds the calf just as new creatures begin rupturing out of its body, and she kills them all. The growing creature from the first calf then appears and attacks her, but Dan creates noise to lure it away. He allows the creature to attack him, creating an opening for Mary to injure the creature with boiling water before she finishes it off. Dan dies from his injuries while Mary leaves the farm.

Four months later, in Birmingham, England, a pregnant Mary is assured by her doctor that her baby is healthy. When the ultrasound monitor is shown, a creature-like shape is briefly seen inside the foetus.

== Cast ==
- John Lynch as Dan, owner of the farm
- Essie Davis as Orla, a vet assisting John
- Marcel Iureș as John, the scientist working with the cattle
- Sean Harris as Jamie, an Irish Traveller, Mary's boyfriend
- Ruth Negga as Mary, Jamie's girlfriend
- Stanley Townsend as Garda Sergeant Tom Hourican
- Crispin Letts as the Doctor in St Thomas's Hospital, Birmingham

== Reception ==
=== Critical response ===
Rotten Tomatoes reported the film received 73% positive reviews, with an average score of 6.13/10.

=== Festivals and awards ===
Isolation was screened at Texas' Fantastic Fest in September 2006 where it received three awards: the horror jury awards for best picture and best director Billy O'Brien, and the second-place audience award behind Hatchet.

The following month it was also shown as the mystery screening of the Wales' inaugural Abertoir Horror Festival.
