= The Goob =

- Directed by: Guy Myhill
- Screenplay by: Guy Myhill
- Production company: BBC Films
- Release date: 2014
- Country: United Kingdom
- Language: English

The Goob is a 2014 British film. It was made by BBC Films and directed by Guy Myhill from his own screenplay. The film was backed by the BFI Film Fund.

== Plot ==
"Goob" Taylor is a school leaver with an abusive stepfather, trapped in rural poverty in Norfolk. He clashes with brutal stock car racer Gene Womack for his mother's attention and falls for a foreign field worker.

== Cast ==
- Liam Walpole as "Goob" Taylor
- Sean Harris as Gene Womack
- Sienna Guillory as Janet
- Hannah Spearritt as Mary Ellen
- Marama Corlett as Eva
- Paul Popplewell as Levi

== Awards and nominations ==
- Winner of the British Independent Film Award for Best Achievement in Production.
- Nominated for Best Supporting Actress (Sienna Guillory) and Most Promising Newcomer (Liam Walpole) at the BIFAs.
- Winner of the Hitchcock d’Or Ciné and the Grand Prix du Jury at the Dinard Film Festival.
- Nominated for Best British Newcomer (Guy Myhill) at the BFI London Film Festival.

== Locations ==
The Goob was filmed in Norfolk, including a disused diner at Necton and stock car racing scenes at Swaffham Raceway.

== Score ==
Luke Abbott's "evocative, atmospheric synthscapes" for The Goob won the award for 'Best Music' at the Stockholm International Film Festival, before being released under the title Music For A Flat Landscape.
