= Calvary (2014 film) =

2014 Irish film by John Michael McDonagh

- U.S. theatrical release poster
- Directed by: John Michael McDonagh
- Written by: John Michael McDonagh
- Produced by: Chris Clark; Flora Fernandez-Marengo; James Flynn
- Starring: Brendan Gleeson; Chris O'Dowd; Kelly Reilly; Aidan Gillen; Dylan Moran; Isaach de Bankolé; M. Emmet Walsh; Marie-Josée Croze; Domhnall Gleeson; David Wilmot; Gary Lydon; Killian Scott; Orla O'Rourke; Owen Sharpe; David McSavage; Mícheál Óg Lane; Mark O'Halloran
- Cinematography: Larry Smith
- Edited by: Chris Gill
- Music by: Patrick Cassidy
- Production companies: Reprisal Films; Octagon Films; Bord Scannán na hÉireann/Irish Film Board; BFI; Lipsync Productions
- Distributed by: Entertainment One
- Release dates: 19 January 2014 (Sundance); 11 April 2014
- Running time: 101 minutes
- Countries: Ireland; United Kingdom
- Language: English
- Box office: $16.9 million

Calvary is a 2014 drama film written and directed by John Michael McDonagh. It stars Brendan Gleeson, Chris O'Dowd, Kelly Reilly, Aidan Gillen, Dylan Moran, Domhnall Gleeson, M. Emmet Walsh and Isaach de Bankolé. The film began production in September 2012 and was released in April 2014 in Ireland and the United Kingdom, in July in Australia and in August 2014 in the United States.

The film was screened at the 2014 Sundance Film Festival and at the 64th Berlin International Film Festival.

== Plot ==
Father James accepts confession from an unseen man, a victim of priest sexual abuse. The penitent says his abuser is dead and the Catholic community is largely indifferent, so he will murder an innocent priest to draw greater outrage. The penitent gives James until next Sunday to put his affairs in order.

Bishop Montgomery advises James to inform the police: the sin is pending and forgiveness was not sought, so James would not break the seal of confession. James is visited by Fiona, his daughter from his pre-ordination marriage. James mentions her attempted suicide, but she blames it on her ex-boyfriend. James continues his parochial duties, encountering antagonism from many locals.

James hears butcher, Jack Brennan, has hit his wife, Veronica, for having an affair with mechanic, Simon. Jack blames Simon, and the couple attests they want a divorce. Simon refuses to talk with James, citing violent missions in his native Africa. James struggles to discuss Simon with Father Leary, who suggests ignoring everything, as Simon could accuse them of racism.

James takes supplies to Gerald, an elderly American writer working in a cottage. Gerald asks James to bring him a gun, afraid of succumbing to pain or senility. James visits Inspector Stanton and borrows an antique revolver from the Anglo-Irish War. Stanton confides that he once arrested a priest on rape accusations but was reassigned while the priest escaped as a missionary. Banker, Michael Fitzgerald, requests a house visit from James. Michael drunkenly brags about his exploitative wealth, bemoans detachment from his family and reality, and insults James. James responds that penance requires seeking forgiveness; Fitzgerald responds by urinating on a rare painting.

At the hospital, James performs the last rites for a fatally injured tourist. He comforts his widow, Teresa, who bravely accepts her husband's death. James visits cannibal prisoner, Freddie Joyce, who is flippant about his crimes, but still asks for forgiveness. James accuses Joyce of insincerity, but pities that nobody can understand him, if not God.

While everyone is at a village pub gathering, the church is destroyed by arson. Montgomery blames James's would-be killer and presses him to report him; James refuses, noting every villager has grievances with him or the church. Fitzgerald offers a large sum for a new church, to the delight of Leary, and the distaste of James. Fiona confronts James, saying he abandoned her after her mother's death, first by his alcoholism and later by the celibacy of the priesthood. James apologizes and they embrace. That night, James finds his dog, Bruno, dead with his throat cut. James tearfully buries Bruno, concealing his death from Fiona as she departs.

While on a walk, James starts a conversation with a young girl. Her father arrives and confronts him, believing he is attempting to groom her. At the pub, James is mocked by the locals and relapses. James drunkenly destroys the bar with the revolver before fighting publican, Brendan. Leary finds James, bloody and drunk, and chides him, as Brendan is Buddhist; James berates Leary's ignorance and his uselessness as a priest. James wakes to find Leary entering a taxi. Leary confesses religious doubts and James apologizes, telling Leary he does not hate him but that Leary has no integrity.

James decides to fly to Dublin but happens across Teresa. Seeing her husband's coffin being disrespected by airport staff, James returns to his parish. On Sunday, James meets Gerald, who boasts about finishing his book, and James wishes him luck. James calls Fiona, saying sin is emphasized too greatly over virtue and forgiveness, and they fully reconcile. James throws the revolver off a cliff immediately before a suicidal Fitzgerald appears. James promises to visit later and embraces the tearful Fitzgerald.

James waits on the beach as Jack Brennan appears with a gun. Jack confesses to arson, and hitting Veronica, but denies killing Bruno. Hearing James's remorse for Bruno, Jack asks if he cried for children abused by priests. James admits feeling detached, and Jack shoots and wounds him. An altar boy witnesses the shot, and runs for help. James assures Jack that it is not too late to stop. Jack tells James to say his prayers; James says he already has, and Jack murders him.

In a brief tableaux, the parishioners and Teresa go about their quotidian lives. The final scene ends as Fiona visits Jack in prison, both picking up their phone handsets as the scene fades to black.

== Cast ==
- Brendan Gleeson as Father James
- Chris O'Dowd as Jack Brennan
- Kelly Reilly as Fiona
- Aidan Gillen as Dr Frank Harte
- Dylan Moran as Michael Fitzgerald
- Isaach de Bankolé as Simon
- M. Emmet Walsh as The Writer, Gerald Ryan
- Marie-Josée Croze as Teresa
- Domhnall Gleeson as Freddie Joyce
- David Wilmot as Father Leary
- Pat Shortt as Brendan Lynch
- Gary Lydon as Inspector Stanton
- Killian Scott as Milo Herlihy
- Orla O'Rourke as Veronica Brennan
- Owen Sharpe as Leo
- David McSavage as Bishop Garret Montgomery

== Production ==
=== Development ===
McDonagh conceived the idea for Calvary and wrote the screenplay while filming The Guard with Gleeson in late 2009. McDonagh explained the intentions he had for the film: "There are probably films in development about priests which involve abuse. My remit is to do the opposite of what other people do, and I wanted to make a film about a good priest." He elaborates that it is tonally "in the same darkly comedic vein as The Guard, but with a much more serious and dramatic narrative." Gleeson's casting was announced in October 2011. The casting of Chris O'Dowd, Kelly Reilly and Aidan Gillen was announced in February 2012, while further casting was announced in August 2012.

=== Principal photography ===
Filming began on 24 September 2012. The production spent three weeks shooting in and around County Sligo, primarily in the town of Easkey where the film is set as well as on Streedagh Beach in north County Sligo, with some segments in Ardgillan Castle, Balbriggan, County Dublin followed by two weeks of filming in Rush, County Dublin.

== Reception ==
=== Box office ===
Calvary had its world premiere at the 2014 Sundance Film Festival on January 19, 2014. Shortly after, Fox Searchlight Pictures secured distribution rights for the US and select international territories. Calvary made its European premiere at the 64th Berlin International Film Festival and its Irish premiere as the gala opening of the Jameson Dublin International Film Festival on 13 February 2014. The film earned $16.9 million worldwide.

=== Critical response ===
Calvary received positive reviews from critics and has a score of 90% on Rotten Tomatoes based on 158 reviews with an average rating of 7.6/10. The critical consensus states "Led by a brilliant performance from Brendan Gleeson, Calvary tackles weighty issues with humour, intelligence, and sensitivity." On Metacritic, the film has a score of 77 out of 100, based on 42 critics.

Justin Chang of Variety magazine praised Gleeson for his soulful performance, called the film a "masterful follow-up to The Guard", and predicted near-certain critical plaudits at a distinguished arthouse reception for the film. Tim Griersen of Screen International also praised Gleeson for his performance and the film, calling it "A rich character drama that's equally eloquent and despairing, Calvary carries a weary resignation that feels lived-in and deeply considered." He cautions that the film might prove to be a hard sell as it examines religious faith and does not fit in an easily marketable genre. Xan Brooks of The Guardian comments on the self-referential nature of the film, and also calls the film "terrific (at least until the denouement, when it rather strains for grandeur)". Brooks gives the film 4/5.

Praising Calvary for its treatment of its weighty thematic elements, Lauren Ely for First Things wrote: "Is it possible for a film to capture the horror of the sexual abuse scandal in the Catholic Church while at the same time presenting a case for the necessity of the institutional priesthood? Against all odds, this is exactly what Irish director John Michael McDonagh's Calvary manages to do." In his review, the cultural commentator and Catholic bishop Robert Barron writes that the film "shows, with extraordinary vividness, what authentic spiritual shepherding looks like and how it feels for a priest to have a shepherd's heart."

Xan Brooks in The Guardian compared it to a mysterious and surreal retelling of the Passion.

=== Awards ===
| Award | Date of Ceremony | Category | Recipient(s) and nominee(s) | Result | Ref(s) |
|---|---|---|---|---|---|
| British Independent Film Awards | 7 December 2014 | Best British Independent Film | Calvary | Nominated | |
| British Independent Film Awards | 7 December 2014 | Best Director | John Michael McDonagh | Nominated | |
| British Independent Film Awards | 7 December 2014 | Best Actor | Brendan Gleeson | Won | |
| British Independent Film Awards | 7 December 2014 | Best Screenplay | John Michael McDonagh | Nominated | |
| Berlin International Film Festival | 17 February 2014 | Prize of the Ecumenical Jury | Calvary | Won | |
| European Film Awards | 13 December 2014 | European Actor | Brendan Gleeson | Nominated | |
| Irish Film and Television Awards | April 5, 2014 | Best Film | Calvary | Won | |
| Irish Film and Television Awards | April 5, 2014 | Best Lead Actor - Film | Brendan Gleeson | Won | |
| Irish Film and Television Awards | April 5, 2014 | Best Screenplay - Film | John Michael McDonagh | Won | |
| Irish Film and Television Awards | April 5, 2014 | Best Director - Film | John Michael McDonagh | Nominated | |
| Irish Film and Television Awards | April 5, 2014 | Best Supporting Actress - Film | Orla O'Rourke | Nominated | |
| Irish Film and Television Awards | April 5, 2014 | Best Original Score | Patrick Cassidy | Nominated | |
| Saturn Award | June 25, 2015 | Best International Film | Calvary | Nominated | |
