= Yann Demange =

French film director

- Born: Yann Demange; November 7, 1977 (age 49); Paris, France
- Occupations: Film director, television director

Yann Demange (born November 7, 1977) is a French film and television director of French and Algerian descent, who grew up in London. After directing the well-received television series Dead Set (2008) and Top Boy (2011), he made his directorial film debut with the critically acclaimed independent film '71 (2014), for which he received the British Independent Film Award for Best Director.

== Biography ==
Born in Paris to a French mother and an Algerian father, Demange moved to London with his mother and two older half-brothers when he was two years old, initially to the south of the city, then the west. His parents split up shortly after the family moved to London, and between the ages of four and twelve, Demange was raised in two four-year placements in foster care in Essex, one with a French-speaking family and the other with a white Cockney family. He was originally given the first name Mounir, however one of his half-brothers convinced his mother to change it so he could avoid discrimination for having an Arabic name, so after his parents split his first name was changed to Yann and Mounir became his middle name. Although he is a French citizen, Demange has said that he does not have a single sense of national identity and that he primarily describes himself as a Londoner.

In the summer of 1991, shortly before the outbreak of the country's Civil War, he travelled to Algeria to meet his extended family: on this trip he saw The Battle of Algiers for the first time, a film in which an aunt of Demange's appeared as one of the film's many non-professional actors. He has said that the awareness of his aunt's role in the film strengthened his love for the medium: "As absurd as it sounds, on some level I think I felt like I had discovered an inheritance to some sort of personal lineage in movies". He began his career at age 18 as a runner on the set of music videos, before enrolling at an arts foundation at the London College of Printing. He later made observational documentaries for General Electric.

In his late 20s, Demange attended the National Film and Television School on a scholarship from Disney. He secured a deal with ICM Partners on the basis of his graduation film, which led to him directing several episodes of the television series Secret Diary of a Call Girl (2007). He next directed the zombie horror series Dead Set (2008), which was nominated for a BAFTA Television Award for Best Drama Serial. For his direction of Channel 4's Top Boy (2011), a gang drama set in Hackney, Demange received a nomination for a BAFTA Television Award for Best Director, while the serial was nominated in the category Best Mini-Series.

Demange made his directorial film debut with '71 (2014), which stars Jack O'Connell as a soldier deployed to Belfast at the height of political violence in Northern Ireland. '71 premiered in competition at the Berlin International Film Festival and went on to receive critical acclaim. Demange won the British Independent Film Award for Best Director and was nominated for the BAFTA Award for Outstanding Debut by a British Writer, Director or Producer. Demange has also been hailed as a promising new voice in British filmmaking.

In November 2022, it was reported that Demange would direct Blade, a theatrical reboot of the Blade film franchise set in the Marvel Cinematic Universe, but was no longer working on the film by June 2024.

== Filmography ==
Film

- Incomplete (2006, short film)
- Headspace (2006, short film)
- Alan & Samir (2007, short film)
- '71 (2014)
- White Boy Rick (2018)
- Dammi (2023, short film)
- Lineage (2027)

Television

- Secret Diary of a Call Girl (2007)
- Coming Up (2007)
- Dead Set (2008)
- Criminal Justice (2009)
- Top Boy (2011)
- Lovecraft Country (2020)
