= Trespass Against Us =

2016 film

- Theatrical release poster
- Directed by: Adam Smith
- Written by: Alastair Siddons
- Produced by: Andrea Calderwood; Gail Egan; Alastair Siddons
- Starring: Michael Fassbender; Brendan Gleeson; Lyndsey Marshal; Killian Scott; Rory Kinnear; Sean Harris
- Cinematography: Eduard Grau
- Edited by: Kristina Hetherington; Jake Roberts
- Music by: Tom Rowlands
- Production companies: Film4; BFI; Protagonist Pictures; Animal Kingdom; Lipsync LLP; Westgrove Partners; DMC Film; Potboiler Productions; Albert Granville
- Distributed by: Lionsgate (United Kingdom); A24 (United States)
- Release dates: 9 September 2016 (Toronto); 20 January 2017 (United States); 3 March 2017 (United Kingdom)
- Running time: 99 minutes
- Countries: United Kingdom; United States
- Language: English
- Box office: $517,197

Trespass Against Us is a 2016 crime drama film directed by Adam Smith and written by Alastair Siddons. The film stars Michael Fassbender, Brendan Gleeson, Sean Harris, Lyndsey Marshal, Rory Kinnear, and Killian Scott.

It was selected to be screened in the Special Presentations section at the 2016 Toronto International Film Festival. It was released in the United States on 20 January 2017, by A24 and in the United Kingdom on 3 March 2017 by Lionsgate.

== Plot ==
To give a better future to his son, traveller Chad Cutler tries to get out of the criminal business which his family has run for generations. However, his own father Colby considers doing so a betrayal, making the task of leaving a well-rooted criminal system an uneasy one.

The Cutler family lives in Gloucestershire, England. They stage a police chase in honour of their brother Bryan, who is in prison. Chad is approached by his father Colby in relation to a Sunday night robbery which he opposes due to the unnecessary risk involved. Chad's wife Kelly wants him to stand up to his aggressive father. Chad wants a different life for his son Tyson, but Colby demands respect for his authority and does not want to see Chad or Tyson leave. The robbery goes forward, and during the robbery the gang set fire to a country estate mansion. In the escape, Chad is forced to kill Officer Lovage's police dog, but manages to elude the police and their helicopter's heat camera by hiding under a heifer.

Chad takes the children from the site to school but later his wife wakes him to the news the children are missing. When the Cutler family approach the police for help, PC Lovage informs Chad's wife that if she informs on her husband and tells them where her husband really was the night of the robbery, they may be able to help. It is later shown that the police already know where the children are as they are in their custody. The next day, an armed response unit descend on the Cutler's family camp. The police damage all the campers and seize the dogs and goat. Colby and Chad are interrogated by the police and are met with uncooperative response. Although the police know Chad and Colby are involved, they are forced to release both men due to a lack of evidence.

Colby calls a family meeting and makes a demand for unity ahead of their next move. Meanwhile, Chad learns his father has forbidden Noah from selling a patch on the settled site to him and thereby blocking him from leaving his controlling father behind. To add to his woes, Chad learns that the local school has expelled his children. Chad and his wife want to escape their current existence and start fresh. Chad goes to buy a puppy for his son for his 7th birthday. But Chad, who never learned to read, cannot complete the necessary paperwork, so the puppy breeder refuses to sell him the dog. In anger Chad comes back, kicks the back door in, takes the puppy and throws the money for it in the air. He takes the puppy and escapes in the taxi which brought him to the house, driving it himself with the taxi driver as an unwilling passenger. The police now have a provable crime. Chad calls Colby to bring his son to the old oak tree. Chad and Tyson climb the tree, where Chad gives his son the puppy, and together they hold off the police. After giving Tyson some fatherly advice, Chad surrenders with words of love to his wife.

== Cast ==
- Michael Fassbender as Chad Cutler - Son
- Brendan Gleeson as Colby Cutler - Father
- Lyndsey Marshal as Kelly Cutler - Wife
- Georgie Smith as Tyson - Grandson
- Rory Kinnear as P.C. Lovage
- Killian Scott as Kenny
- Sean Harris as Gordon Bennett
- Kingsley Ben-Adir as Sampson
- Gerard Kearns as Lester
- Barry Keoghan as Windows
- Kacie Anderson as Mini Cutler - Granddaughter
- Tony Way as Norman
- Ezra Khan as Jamail
- Alan Williams as Noah
- Anastasia Hille as Mrs. Crawley
- Peter Wight as Dog owner
- Mark Lewis Jones as P.C. Pollock

== Production ==
On 31 October 2013, it was announced that Michael Fassbender would be starring in the gangster film, titled Trespass Against Us, which Adam Smith would direct, based on the script by Alastair Siddons. Siddons would produce along with Gail Egan and Andrea Calderwood through Potboiler Productions. Film4 Productions would co-finance the film, whose score would be done by The Chemical Brothers. On 16 May 2014, more cast was announced including Brendan Gleeson, Sean Harris, Lyndsey Marshal, Rory Kinnear and Killian Scott.

Filming began in June 2014 in the United Kingdom.

== Release ==
On 16 May 2014, Lionsgate acquired the UK rights to the film. A24 acquired US rights to the film on 16 December 2014. The film was released in the United States on 24 November 2016, before opening in a limited release and through video on demand on 20 January 2017. The film was released in the United Kingdom on 3 March 2017.

== Reception ==
=== Critical response ===
Trespass Against Us received mixed reviews from critics. On review aggregator Rotten Tomatoes, the film has an approval rating of 56%, based on 73 reviews, with an average score of 5.6/10. The site's consensus reads, "Trespass Against Us benefits from Michael Fassbender and Brendan Gleeson's typically strong performances, even when they aren't quite enough to balance the story's narrative drift and awkward tonal shifts." On Metacritic, the film has a score of 50 out of 100, based on 16 critics, indicating "mixed or average reviews".
