= Catch Me Daddy =

2014 film

- Film poster
- Directed by: Daniel Wolfe
- Written by: Daniel Wolfe; Matthew Wolfe
- Starring: Sameena Jabeen Ahmed; Gary Lewis; Conor McCarron
- Cinematography: Robbie Ryan
- Production companies: Film4; British Film Institute; Screen Yorkshire
- Distributed by: StudioCanal
- Release dates: 16 May 2014 (Cannes); 27 February 2015 (UK)
- Running time: 110 minutes
- Country: United Kingdom
- Language: English

Catch Me Daddy is a 2014 British thriller film directed by Daniel Wolfe. It was screened as part of the Directors' Fortnight section of the 2014 Cannes Film Festival. The film received its British debut screening at the 2014 London Film Festival. Sameena Ahmed won the award at the festival for the Best British Newcomer. It was shown at the Leeds Film Festival in November 2014. Wolfe wrote the script with his brother, Matthew Wolfe.

== Plot ==
A young Pakistani woman (Sameena Jabeen Ahmed), Laila, lives in a caravan with her boyfriend Aaron, after fleeing from her family. The couple get by on little means, relying on Laila's job at a local hairdressers. Laila's brother, his friends, and two hired thugs track Laila down when Aaron is out. Her brother enters the caravan alone, and, after a struggle, is accidentally wounded and dies. Laila escapes through a window, later reuniting with Aaron.

When Aaron receives a photograph on his phone showing his mother tied up and gagged, they decide to give themselves up. On doing so, they are greeted by two cars. One of the hired thugs exits his vehicle and savagely murders Aaron with an axe. Tony appears appalled by the scene, and runs out of his car brandishing a pistol. He fends the men off and drives away with Laila.

Tony returns Laila to her distressed father. After receiving payment, he leaves. The film ends with Laila forced to place a noose around her neck and stand on a chair. She begs her father to let her take it off but, in a state of confusion and anger over his son's death, he sits on the floor, head in hands. Laila's fate is left unknown.

== Filming locations ==
Much of the film was shot in Todmorden in West Yorkshire with additional filming conducted on the moors near Rishworth and Wainstalls. The caravan park scenes were shot on the outskirts of Bradford. Droylsden and Accrington were also used for scenes where the men are searching for Aaron and Laila.

== Critical reception ==
The film has a 'fresh' rating of 91% on Rotten Tomatoes.
