= Frank (film) =

2014 black comedy film

- Theatrical release poster
- Directed by: Lenny Abrahamson
- Screenplay by: Jon Ronson; Peter Straughan
- Based on: Newspaper article by Jon Ronson
- Produced by: David Barron; Ed Guiney; Stevie Lee
- Starring: Domhnall Gleeson; Maggie Gyllenhaal; Scoot McNairy; Michael Fassbender; François Civil; Carla Azar
- Cinematography: James Mather
- Edited by: Nathan Nugent
- Music by: Stephen Rennicks
- Production companies: Film4; BFI; Protagonist Pictures; Bord Scannán na hÉireann/Irish Film Board; Element Pictures; Runaway Fridge Films
- Distributed by: Element Pictures (Ireland); Artificial Eye (United Kingdom)
- Release dates: 17 January 2014 (Sundance); 9 May 2014 (Ireland/United Kingdom); 15 August 2014 (United States)
- Running time: 95 minutes
- Countries: Ireland; United Kingdom; United States
- Language: English
- Budget: $1 million
- Box office: $1.9 million

Frank is a 2014 black comedy film directed by Lenny Abrahamson from a screenplay by Jon Ronson and Peter Straughan. It stars Michael Fassbender, Domhnall Gleeson, Maggie Gyllenhaal, Scoot McNairy, and François Civil.

Frank premiered at the 2014 Sundance Film Festival on 17 January 2014 and was released theatrically in Ireland and the United Kingdom on 9 May. The film received critical acclaim.

== Plot ==
While walking along the beach in his hometown, aspiring songwriter Jon Burroughs witnesses a man named Lucas trying to drown himself. As Lucas is taken to the hospital, Jon meets Don, who explains that Lucas was the keyboardist for a band called The Soronprfbs, which Don manages. After mentioning that he plays keyboards, Jon is invited to perform with them that night. The Soronprfbs' drummer Nana, synthesizer and theremin player Clara, and guitarist Baraque are reluctant to accept Jon, but he is warmly welcomed by lead vocalist Frank, who always wears a papier-mâché mask over his head. Their performance abruptly ends when Clara storms offstage after being shocked by an electrical fault.

Frank invites Jon to be part of a Soronprfbs project. He agrees and accompanies them to a remote cabin in Ireland, believing it will only take a few days, only to realize they are set to stay there for a whole year. One day, Don confesses to Jon that he feels he cannot live up to Frank's prowess. The next day, Don reveals they are being evicted from the cabin, but Jon offers to pay the outstanding rent using his grandfather's inheritance. After completing their debut album, the band finds what appears to be Frank's corpse hanging from a tree, but upon removing the mask, they discover it is actually Don. After they cremate him, Clara reveals to Jon that Don was the band's original keyboardist.

Jon reveals that he has been secretly uploading the band's recording sessions on social media, earning them a small fan following and an invitation to perform at South by Southwest. Most of the band is offended by Jon's clandestine promotion of them, but Frank, excited by the prospect of a large audience, agrees to go to the festival. Clara confronts Jon as the latter is soaking in the hot tub, expressing contempt for his growing influence over Frank. The ensuing argument culminates in them having angry sex, and Clara threatens to stab him if the trip to America goes awry.

The band begins to argue over creative differences leading up to the performance. Clara and Frank disappear shortly before the concert; Jon finds them in an alley, where Clara is helping Frank stave off a mental breakdown. Jon tries to get Frank to return to the festival with him, prompting Clara to stab him in the leg as promised. After she is arrested, Jon uses the scandal to build publicity for the band. The night before the concert, Nana and Baraque quit the band. Jon and Frank go onstage by themselves in spite of Frank's deteriorating mental health. When Jon tries to begin the set with one of his own songs rather than one from the album, Frank has a breakdown and collapses on stage. They move into a cheap motel together, where a frustrated Jon tries to forcibly unmask Frank. Frank tries to escape and is hit by a car, smashing the fake head. He flees before Jon can see his face.

Sometime later, Jon visits a dive bar where Clara, Nana, and Baraque are playing as a trio, and apologizes to them for having taken control of the band. After numerous failed attempts, he finally succeeds in tracking Frank to his hometown of Bluff City, Kansas, where he is living with his parents. Jon sees Frank's real face for the first time, and discovers he is scarred and balding from prolonged use of the mask. Frank's parents explain that he has suffered from severe mental health issues most of his life, and began wearing the mask as a teenager after his dad made it for him for an alleged costume party. When Jon suggests that Frank's suffering has led to his creativity and brilliance, his parents retort that Frank has always been musically talented, and that if anything, his mental illness has held him back. Frank declares he has been unable to make music since the band fell apart. Jon takes Frank to the dive bar where the others are playing; they quickly realize who he is and join him as he begins to sing. With the original Soronprfbs restored, Jon leaves the bar alone.

== Cast ==
- Michael Fassbender as Frank, the eccentric titular character and leader of the band who wears a large papier-mâché head throughout the film, similar to that worn by the late Frank Sidebottom. Director Lenny Abrahamson said that Fassbender was "very comfortable" wearing the head and said that he even enjoyed acting in it.
- Domhnall Gleeson as Jon Burroughs, a young wannabe musician who joins Frank's band.
- Maggie Gyllenhaal as Clara Wagner, Frank's often aggressive sidekick who plays a Korg MS-20 and a theremin. Gyllenhaal originally turned down the role, saying that she didn't understand it, but the story stuck with her and weeks later she changed her mind. Before filming started, Gyllenhaal decided to act as though Clara was Frank's true love but said that it was hard due to Frank's head.
- Scoot McNairy as Don, the band's manager, producer and sound engineer.
- François Civil as Baraque, the band's French guitar player.
- Carla Azar as Nana, the band's drummer.
- Tess Harper as Frank's Mother.
- Bruce McIntosh as Frank's Father.
- Haley Derryberry as Simone
- Lauren Poole as Alice

== Production ==
Frank is a fictional story mostly inspired by Frank Sidebottom, the comic persona of Chris Sievey who is thought to have given his backing to the film before his death, but the plot was also inspired by other musicians like Daniel Johnston, Captain Beefheart, and Frank Zappa. Jon Ronson, who co-wrote the film, was part of Sidebottom's band, and the plot began as an adaptation of his writings but later became a fictional take on it. The film was shot in County Wicklow, Dublin, and New Mexico in 2013.

Stephen Rennicks served as music director, tasked to write songs that were a hybrid of pop and experimental rock music. Rennicks was inspired by musicians he met while in his own 1980s band, the Prunes. He also wrote the score and supervised the recordings of his original songs. The music performed by the band in the film was recorded live by the cast while filming.

== Release ==
The film premiered at the Sundance Film Festival on 17 January 2014. When audiences went to see the film at Sundance, they were all given masks similar to that worn by Frank in the film. The film premiered in Europe at its European premiere in Dublin on 25 April 2014. The film was released in cinemas nationwide in the Republic of Ireland and in the United Kingdom on 9 May 2014.

== Reception ==
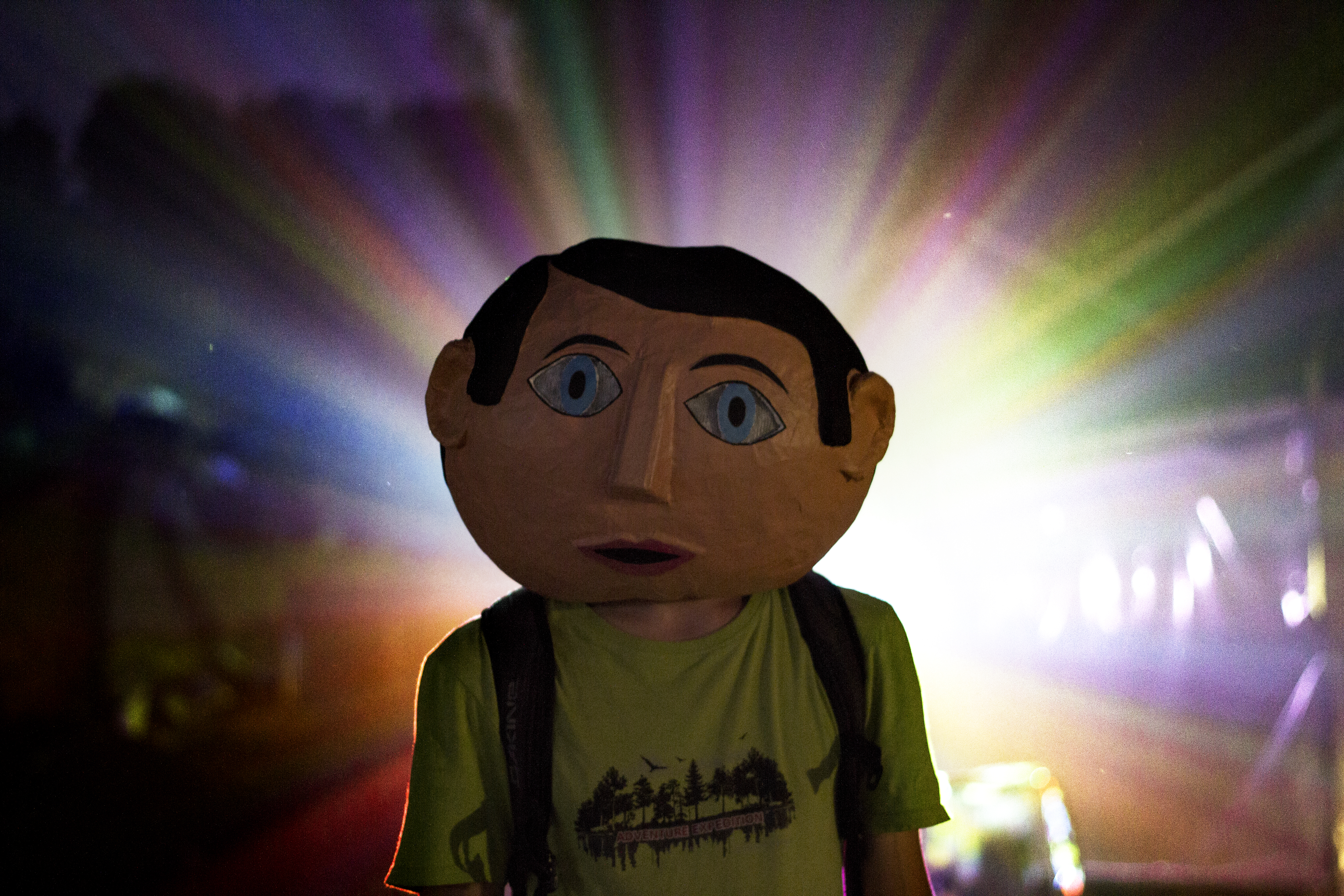
Person with a Frank mask at Sziget Festival 2015

Frank received highly positive reviews from critics and has a rating of 92% on Rotten Tomatoes based on 163 reviews with a weighted average score of 7.46/10. The website's critical consensus states, "Funny, clever, and endearingly unusual, Frank transcends its quirky trappings with a heartfelt — and surprisingly thought-provoking — story." On review aggregator Metacritic, Frank has a score of 75 out of 100 based on 33 critics, signifying "generally favourable reviews".

The Daily Telegraph's Amber Wilkinson rated the film 4/5, calling it "off-beat and punk-spirited." Peter Bradshaw of The Guardian gave it four stars out of five, saying: "Frank works as satire, as memoir, as comedy bromance, but it works mostly because it is just so weird". Mark Kermode of The Observer named it one of the top five films of 2014. Criticism for the film was largely based on how the plot developed towards its end.

In conjunction with the U.S. release of the film, Michael Fassbender made an appearance as Frank with his band on The Colbert Report.

=== Accolades ===
| Date of ceremony | Group | Category | Recipient(s) | Result |
|---|---|---|---|---|
| 7 December 2014 | British Independent Film Awards | Best Screenplay | Jon Ronson and Peter Straughan | Won |
| 7 December 2014 | British Independent Film Awards | Best Technical Achievement – Music | Stephen Rennicks | Won |
| 18 December 2014 | Las Vegas Film Critics Society Awards | Best Song | "I Love You All" | Won |
| December 2014 | Les Arcs European Cinema Festival | Best Score | Stephen Rennicks | Won |
| 24 May 2015 | Irish Film and Television Awards | Best Director in Film | Lenny Abrahamson | Won |
| 24 May 2015 | Irish Film and Television Awards | Best Actor in a Supporting Role in a Feature Film | Domhnall Gleeson | Won |
| 24 May 2015 | Irish Film and Television Awards | Best Cinematography | James Mather | Won |

== See also ==
- Frank (soundtrack)
