= British Independent Film Award for Best Documentary =

Film award category

- Awarded for: Best Documentary
- Country: United Kingdom
- Presented by: BIFA
- First award: 2003
- Currently held by: Witches (2024)
- Website: www.bifa.org.uk

The British Independent Film Award for Best Documentary is an annual award given by the British Independent Film Awards (BIFA) to recognize the best documentary.

The award was first presented in the 2003 ceremony, with the film Bodysong, directed by Simon Pummell and Janine Marmot, being the first recipient of the award.

Senna and For Sama have won both this award and the BAFTA Award for Best Documentary, while The Imposter, Marley, 20,000 Days on Earth, Virunga, Amy, Notes on Blindness, Diego Maradona, Cow, and Super/Man: The Christopher Reeve Story, all have been nominated for both awards.

== Winners and nominees ==
=== 2000s ===
| Year | Film | Recipient(s) |
|---|---|---|
| 2003 (6th) | Bodysong | Simon Pummell and Janine Marmot |
| 2003 (6th) | 100 Doors | Kerri Davenport-Burton |
| 2003 (6th) | Bugs | Mike Slee |
| 2003 (6th) | The Game of Their Lives | Daniel Gordon |
| 2003 (6th) | Hoover Street Revival | Sophie Fiennes |
| 2004 (7th) | Touching the Void | Kevin Macdonald and John Smithson |
| 2004 (7th) | Aileen: Life and Death of a Serial Killer | Nick Broomfield, Joan Churchill and Jo Human |
| 2004 (7th) | Drowned Out | Franny Armstrong |
| 2004 (7th) | Peace One Day | Jeremy Gilley |
| 2004 (7th) | Trollywood | Madeleine Farley, Philip Moross, Nick Nahum and Simon White |
| 2005 (8th) | The Liberace of Baghdad | Sean McAllister, Nick Fraser, Mette Heide and Mette Hoffman Meyer |
| 2005 (8th) | Andrew and Jeremy Get Married | Don Boyd |
| 2005 (8th) | Black Sun | Gary Tarn and John Battsek |
| 2005 (8th) | McLibel | Franny Armstrong and Ken Loach |
| 2005 (8th) | Sisters in Law | Florence Ayisi and Kim Longinotto |
| 2006 (9th) | The Road to Guantánamo | Michael Winterbottom and Melissa Parmenter |
| 2006 (9th) | Blindsight | Lucy Walker and Sybil Robson Orr |
| 2006 (9th) | The Great Happiness Space | Jake Clennell |
| 2006 (9th) | The Pervert's Guide to Cinema | Sophie Fiennes and Slavoj Žižek |
| 2006 (9th) | Unknown White Male | Rupert Murray |
| 2007 (10th) | Joe Strummer: The Future Is Unwritten | Julien Temple, Anna Campeau, Alan Moloney and Amanda Temple |
| 2007 (10th) | Black Gold | Marc Francis, Nick Francis and Christopher Hird |
| 2007 (10th) | Deep Water | Louise Osmond, Jerry Rothwell, Alison Morrow, Jonny Persey and John Smithson |
| 2007 (10th) | Garbage Warrior | Oliver Hodge and Rachel Wexler |
| 2007 (10th) | In the Shadow of the Moon | David Sington, Christopher Riley, Duncan Copp, Sarah Kinsella, John Battsek and Julie Goldman |
| 2008 (11th) | Man on Wire | James Marsh and Simon Chinn |
| 2008 (11th) | A Complete History of My Sexual Failures | Chris Waitt, Henry Trotter and Mary Burke |
| 2008 (11th) | Derek | Isaac Julien |
| 2008 (11th) | Of Time and the City | Terence Davies, Solon Papadopoulos and Roy Boulter |
| 2008 (11th) | Three Miles North of Molkom | Robert Cannan and Corinna McFarlane |
| 2009 (12th) | Mugabe and the White African | Lucy Bailey, Andrew Thompson, David Pearson and Elizabeth Morgan Hemlock |
| 2009 (12th) | The Age of Stupid | Franny Armstrong and Lizzie Gillett |
| 2009 (12th) | The End of the Line | Rupert Murray, George Duffield and Claire Lewis |
| 2009 (12th) | Sons of Cuba | Andrew Lang, Francine Heywood and Laura Giles |
| 2009 (12th) | Sounds Like Teen Spirit | Jamie Jay Johnson, Simon Fawcett, Maxyne Franklin, Jess Search and Paul White |

=== 2010s ===
| Year | Film | Recipient(s) |
|---|---|---|
| 2010 (13th) | Enemies of the People | Thet Sambath and Rob Lemkin |
| 2010 (13th) | The Arbor | Clio Barnard |
| 2010 (13th) | Exit Through the Gift Shop | Banksy and Jaimie D'Cruz |
| 2010 (13th) | Fire in Babylon | Stevan Riley |
| 2010 (13th) | Waste Land | Lucy Walker, João Jardim, Karen Harley, Angus Aynsley and Hank Levine |
| 2011 (14th) | Senna | Asif Kapadia, Tim Bevan, Eric Fellner, James Gay-Rees and Manish Pandey |
| 2011 (14th) | Hell and Back Again | Danfung Dennis, Martin Herring and Mike Lerner |
| 2011 (14th) | Life in a Day | Kevin Macdonald and Liza Marshall |
| 2011 (14th) | Project Nim | James Marsh and Simon Chinn |
| 2011 (14th) | TT3D: Closer to the Edge | Richard De Aragues, Steve Christian and Marc Samuelson |
| 2012 (15th) | The Imposter | Bart Layton and Dimitri Doganis |
| 2012 (15th) | Dreams of a Life | Carol Morley and Cairo Cannon |
| 2012 (15th) | London: The Modern Babylon | Julien Temple |
| 2012 (15th) | Marley | Kevin Macdonald and Charles Steele |
| 2012 (15th) | Roman Polanski: A Film Memoir | Laurent Bouzereau, Luca Barbareschi, Andrew Braunsberg, Christoph Fisser, Henning Molfenter and Charlie Woebcken |
| 2013 (16th) | Pussy Riot: A Punk Prayer | Mike Lerner, Maxim Pozdorovkin and Havana Marking |
| 2013 (16th) | The Great Hip Hop Hoax | Jeanie Finlay |
| 2013 (16th) | The Moo Man | Andy Heathcote and Heike Bachelier |
| 2013 (16th) | The Spirit of '45 | Ken Loach, Rebecca O'Brien, Kate Ogborn and Lisa Marie Russo |
| 2013 (16th) | The Stone Roses: Made of Stone | Shane Meadows, Mark Herbert and Libby Durdy |
| 2014 (17th) | Next Goal Wins | Mike Brett, Steve Jamison and Kristian Brodie |
| 2014 (17th) | 20,000 Days on Earth | Iain Forsyth and Jane Pollard |
| 2014 (17th) | Night Will Fall | André Singer, Sally Angel and Brett Ratner |
| 2014 (17th) | The Possibilities are Endless | James Hall and Edward Lovelace |
| 2014 (17th) | Virunga | Orlando von Einsiedel and Joanna Natasegara |
| 2015 (18th) | Dark Horse: The Incredible True Story of Dream Alliance | Louise Osmond |
| 2015 (18th) | Amy | Asif Kapadia and James Gay-Rees |
| 2015 (18th) | How to Change the World | Jerry Rothwell, Al Morrow and Bous de Jong |
| 2015 (18th) | Palio | Cosima Spender |
| 2015 (18th) | A Syrian Love Story | Sean McAllister and Elhum Shakerifar |
| 2016 (19th) | Notes on Blindness | Peter Middleton, James Spinney, Mike Brett, Jo-Jo Ellison, Steve Jamison and Alex Usborne |
| 2016 (19th) | Dancer | Steven Cantor and Gabrielle Tana |
| 2016 (19th) | The Confession: Living the War on Terror | Ashish Ghadiali and James Rogan |
| 2016 (19th) | The Hard Stop | George Amponsah and Dionne Walker |
| 2016 (19th) | Versus: The Life and Films of Ken Loach | Louise Osmond and Rebecca O'Brien |
| 2017 (20th) | Almost Heaven | Carol Salter |
| 2017 (20th) | Half Way | Daisy-May Hudson |
| 2017 (20th) | Kingdom of Us | Lucy Cohen, Julia Nottingham, Lucas Ochoa, Thomas Benski and Bill Rudgard |
| 2017 (20th) | Uncle Howard | Aaron Brookner and Paula Alvarez Vaccaro |
| 2017 (20th) | Williams | Morgan Matthews, Hayley Reynolds and Sarah Hamilton |
| 2018 (21st) | Evelyn | Orlando von Einsiedel and Joanna Natasegara |
| 2018 (21st) | Being Frank: The Chris Sievey Story | Steve Sullivan |
| 2018 (21st) | Island | Steven Eastwood and Elhum Shakerifar |
| 2018 (21st) | Nae Pasaran | Felipe Bustos Sierra |
| 2018 (21st) | Under the Wire | Chris Martin and Tom Brisley |
| 2019 (22nd) | For Sama | Waad Al-Kateab and Edward Watts |
| 2019 (22nd) | Coup 53 | Taghi Amirani, Walter Murch and Paul Zaentz |
| 2019 (22nd) | Diego Maradona | Asif Kapadia, James Gay-Rees and Paul Martin |
| 2019 (22nd) | Seahorse | Jeanie Finlay and Andrea Cornwell |
| 2019 (22nd) | Tell Me Who I Am | Ed Perkins and Simon Chinn |

=== 2020s ===
| Year | Film | Recipient(s) |
|---|---|---|
| 2020 (23rd) | The Reason I Jump | Jerry Rothwell, Jeremy Dear, Stevie Lee and Al Morrow |
| 2020 (23rd) | The Australian Dream | Daniel Gordon, Stan Grant and Sarah Thomson |
| 2020 (23rd) | Being a Human Person | Fred Scott, Mike Brett, Seve Jamisonand and Jo Jo Ellison |
| 2020 (23rd) | Rising Phoenix | Ian Bonhôte, Peter Ettedgui, John Battsek, Greg Nugent and Tatyana McFadden |
| 2020 (23rd) | White Riot | Rubika Shah and Ed Gibbs |
| 2021 (24th) | Poly Styrene: I Am a Cliché | Paul Sng, Celeste Bell, Zoë Howe, Rebecca Mark-Lawson, Matthew Silverman and Daria Mitsche |
| 2021 (24th) | Cow | Andrea Arnold and Kat Mansoor |
| 2021 (24th) | Dying to Divorce | Chloe Fairweather and Sinead Kirwan |
| 2021 (24th) | I Am Belmaya | Sue Carpenter and Christopher Hird |
| 2021 (24th) | Keyboard Fantasies | Posy Dixon and Liv Proctor |
| 2022 (25th) | Nothing Compares | Kathryn Ferguson, Eleanor Emptage and Michael Mallie |
| 2022 (25th) | My Childhood, My Country – 20 Years in Afghanistan | Phil Grabsky, Shoaib Sharifi and Amanda Wilkie |
| 2022 (25th) | My Old School | Jono McLeod, John Archer and Olivia Lichtenstein |
| 2022 (25th) | Nascondino | Victoria Fiore, Jennifer Corcoran and Aleksandra Bilić |
| 2022 (25th) | Young Plato | Neasa Ní Chianáin, Declan McGrath and David Rane |
| 2023 (26th) | If the Streets Were on Fire | Alice Russell and Gannesh Rajah |
| 2023 (26th) | Bobi Wine: The People's President | Christopher Sharp, Moses Bwayo and John Battsek |
| 2023 (26th) | Another Body | Sophie Compton, Reubyn Hamlyn, Isabel Freeman and Elizabeth Woodward |
| 2023 (26th) | Lyra | Alison Millar and Jackie Doyle |
| 2023 (26th) | Occupied City | Steve McQueen, Bianca Stigter, Anna Smith-Tenser and Floor Onrust |
| 2024 (27th) | Witches | Elizabeth Sankey, Jeremy Warmsley, Chiara Ventura and Manon Ardisson |
| 2024 (27th) | Grand Theft Hamlet | Pinny Grylls, Sam Crane, Julia Ton and Rebecca Wolff |
| 2024 (27th) | Super/Man: The Christopher Reeve Story | Ian Bonhôte, Peter Ettedgui, Lizzie Gillett and Robert Ford |
| 2024 (27th) | Two Strangers Trying Not to Kill Each Other | Jacob Perlmutter, Manon Ouimet and Signe Byrge Sørensen |
| 2024 (27th) | The Contestant | Clair Titley, Megumi Inman, Andee Ryder, Amit Dey and Ian Bonhôte |
| 2025 (28th) | Antidote | James Jones and David Moulton |
| 2025 (28th) | Mother Vera | Cecile Embleton, Alys Tomlinson, and Laura Shacham |
| 2025 (28th) | Motherboard | Victoria Mapplebeck |
| 2025 (28th) | The Shepherd and the Bear | Max Keegan, Elizabeth Woodward, Amanda McBaine, and Jesse Moss |
| 2025 (28th) | A Want in Her | Myrid Carten, Tadhg O’Sullivan, Roisin Geraghty, and Kat Mansoor |

== See also ==
- BAFTA Award for Best Documentary
