= British Independent Film Award – The Raindance Maverick Award =

British film award

Raindance Maverick Award
- Awarded for: Risk-taking films made under £1m
- Country: United Kingdom
- Presented by: Raindance Film Festival; British Independent Film Awards (BIFA)
- First award: 2004
- Currently held by: Grand Theft Hamlet (2024)
- Website: www.bifa.org.uk

The Raindance Maverick Award is an award created by independent film festival Raindance Film Festival and presented during the British Independent Film Awards, to "highlight innovation, uniqueness of vision, maverick filmmaking and risk-taking generally in fiction films with a budget under £1m, rewarding bold, creative, ambitious work that belies its limited budget". The award goes to the film's director, producers, and screenwriters.

It was first presented in 2004. The Barn, directed by Ruaridh Webster, was the first recipient of the award. Since its inception, it has been presented under different names. From 2003 to 2014, the award was presented as The Raindance Award. The following name it was renamed into The Discovery Award, remaining under said name until 2019. Later, from 2020 to 2022, the names were merged into The Raindance Discovery Award, being changed into its current name in 2023.

== Winners and nominees ==
=== 2000s ===
Year	Film	Recipient(s)
2004 (7th)	The Barn	Ruaridh Webster, Jake Broder and Adam Long
2004 (7th)	Blinded	Eleanor Yule and Oscar van Heek
2004 (7th)	Chicken Tikka Masala	Harmage Singh Kalirai, Rony Ghosh, Roopesh Parekh and Sanjay Tandon
2005 (8th)	Evil Aliens	Jake West
2005 (8th)	Billy Childish Is Dead	Graham Bendel
2005 (8th)	Sam Jackson's Secret Video Diary	Guy Rowland
2006 (9th)	Ballad of AJ Weberman	James Bluemel and Oliver Ralfe
2006 (9th)	London to Brighton	Paul Andrew Williams, Alastair Clark, Rachel Robey and Ken Marshall
2006 (9th)	Scenes of a Sexual Nature	Ed Blum, Aschlin Ditta, Suran Goonatilake, Vadim Jean and Amanda Wilkie
2007 (10th)	The Inheritance	Charles-Henri Belleville, Tim Barrow and David Boaretto
2007 (10th)	Exhibit A	Dom Rotheroe and Darren Bender
2007 (10th)	Tovarisch, I Am Not Dead	Stuart Urban, Frances Cook, Emily Harris, Alan Jay and Mark Pegg
2008 (11th)	Zebra Crossings	Sam Holland
2008 (11th)	Clubbed	Neil Thompson, Geoff Thompson and Martin Carr
2008 (11th)	Flick	David Howard and Rik Hall
2008 (11th)	One Day Removals	Mark Stirton
2009 (12th)	Down Terrace	Ben Wheatley, Robin Hill and Andrew Starke
2009 (12th)	Colin	Marc Price
2009 (12th)	The Disappearance of Alice Creed	J Blakeson and Adrian Sturges
2009 (12th)	Exam	Stuart Hazeldine, Simon Garrity and Gareth Unwin
2009 (12th)	They Call It Acid	Gordon Mason

=== 2010s ===
Year	Film	Recipient(s)
2010 (13th)	Son of Babylon	Mohamed Al-Daradji, Mithal Ghazi, Jennifer Norridge, Isabelle Stead and Atia Al-Daradji
2010 (13th)	Brilliant Love	Ashley Horner and Sean Conway
2010 (13th)	Jackboots on Whitehall	The McHenry Brothers, Patrick Scoffin, Karl Richards and Frank Mannion
2010 (13th)	Legacy	Thomas Ikimi, Amrit Walia, Idris Elba, Jessica Levick, Arabella Page Croft and Kieran Parker
2010 (13th)	Treacle Jr.	Jamie Thraves and Rob Small
2011 (14th)	Leaving Baghdad	Koutaiba Al-Janabi
2011 (14th)	Acts of Godfrey	Johnny Daukes
2011 (14th)	Black Pond	Tom Kingsley, Will Sharpe and Sarah Brocklehurst
2011 (14th)	Hollow	Michael Axelgaard and Matthew Holt
2011 (14th)	A Thousand Kisses Deep	Dana Lustig, Alex Kustanovich and Vadim Moldovan
2012 (15th)	Strings	Rob Savage and Nathan Craig
2012 (15th)	Love Tomorrow	Christopher Payne
2012 (15th)	Frank	Richard Heslop
2012 (15th)	Jason Becker: Not Dead Yet	Jesse Vile
2012 (15th)	City Slacker	James Larkin and Michael Müller
2013 (16th)	The Machine	Caradog W. James and John Giwa-Amu
2013 (16th)	Everyone's Going to Die	Jones and Kelly Broad
2013 (16th)	The Patrol	Tom Petch, Tom Stuart and Karim Debbagh
2013 (16th)	Sleeping Dogs	Floris Ramaekers and Simon Clark
2013 (16th)	Titus	Charlie Cattrall and Nico Mensinga
2014 (17th)	Luna	Dave McKean and Allen Spiegel
2014 (17th)	Film: The Movie	Raffaello Degruttola
2014 (17th)	Gregor	Mickey Down and Konrad Kay
2014 (17th)	Keeping Rosy	Steve Reeves and Mike Oughton
2014 (17th)	The Beat Beneath My Feet	John Williams and Michael Müller
2015 (18th)	Orion: The Man Who Would Be King	Jeanie Finlay
2015 (18th)	Aaaaaaaah!	Steve Oram and Andrew Starke
2015 (18th)	Burn Burn Burn	Chanya Button, Charlie Covell, Daniel-Konrad Cooper and Tim Phillips
2015 (18th)	The Return	Steven F. Zambo and Jeffrey Schallert
2015 (18th)	Winter	Heidi Greensmith
2016 (19th)	The Greasy Strangler	Jim Hosking, Toby Harvard, Daniel Noah, Andrew Starke, Ant Timpson, Josh C. Waller and Elijah Wood
2016 (19th)	Black Mountain Poets	Jamie Adams and Jon Rennie
2016 (19th)	The Darkest Universe	Tom Kingsley, Will Sharpe, Tiani Ghosh and Jo-Jo Elison
2016 (19th)	The Ghoul	Gareth Tunley, Jack Healy Guttmann and Tom Meeten
2016 (19th)	Gozo	Miranda Bowen and Steven Sheil
2017 (20th)	In Another Life	Philippe de Pierpont, Julie Frères, Hanne Phlypo, Rebecca Houzel and Quentin Jacques
2017 (20th)	Even When I Fall	Sky Neal, Kate McLarnon and Elhum Shakerifar
2017 (20th)	Halfway	Ben Caird and Jonny Paterson
2017 (20th)	Isolani	R. Paul Wilson
2017 (20th)	My Pure Land	Sarmad Masud and Bill Kenwright
2018 (21st)	Voyageuse	May Miles Thomas
2018 (21st)	The Dig	Simon Stone, Moira Buffini, Gabrielle Tana, Ellie Wood, Carolyn Marks Blackwood and Murray Ferguson
2018 (21st)	Irene's Ghost	Iain Cunningham and David Arthur
2018 (21st)	A Moment in the Reeds	Mikko Mäkelä, James Watson and Jarno Pimperi
2018 (21st)	Super November	Douglas King and Josie Long
2019 (22nd)	Children of the Snow Land	Zara Balfour, Marcus Stephenson and Mark Hakansson
2019 (22nd)	A Bump Along the Way	Shelly Love
2019 (22nd)	Here for Life	Adrian Jackson & Andrea Luka Zimmerman, James Lingwood, Michael Morris, Cressida Day Cunningham, Rebecca Mark-Lawson, David Arthur and Ellie Land
2019 (22nd)	Muscle	Gerard Johnson, Matthew James Wilkinson, Richard Wylie and Ed Barratt
2019 (22nd)	The Street	Zed Nelson

=== 2020s ===
Year	Film	Recipient(s)
2020 (23rd)	Perfect 10	Eva Riley, Jacob Thomas, Bertrand Faivre and Valentina Brazzini
2020 (23rd)	Justine	Jamie Patterson, Jeff Murphy, Jason Rush, Sarah Drew and Julius Beltrame
2020 (23rd)	Looted	Rene Van Pannevis, Kefi Chadwick, Jennifer Eriksson and Jessie Magnum
2020 (23rd)	One Man and His Shoes	Yemi Bamiro and Will Thorne
2020 (23rd)	Rose: A Love Story	Jennifer Sheridan, April Kelley, Sara Huxley, Matt Stokoe, Rob Taylor and Sophie Rundle
2021 (24th)	Poly Styrene: I Am a Cliché	Paul Sng, Celeste Bell, Zoë Howe, Rebecca Mark-Lawson, Matthew Silverman and Daria Mitsche
2021 (24th)	Bank Job	Daniel Edelsty, Hilary Powell and Christopher Hird
2021 (24th)	The Bike Thief	Matt Chambers, PK Fellowes, Sophia Gibber and Lene Bausager
2021 (24th)	I Am Belmaya	Sue Carpenter and Christopher Hird
2021 (24th)	Rebel Dykes	Harri Shanahan, Sian A. Williams and Siobhan Fahey
2022 (25th)	Winners	Hassan Nazer, Nadira Murray and Paul Welsh
2022 (25th)	Electric Malady	Marie Lidén and Aimara Reques
2022 (25th)	Fadia's Tree	Sarah Beddington and Susan Simnett
2022 (25th)	Off the Rails	Peter Day, Grant Keir and Rob Alexander
2022 (25th)	Rebellion	Elena Sánchez Bellot, Maia Kenworthy and Kat Mansoor
2023 (26th)	If the Streets Were on Fire	Alice Russell and Gannesh Rajah
2023 (26th)	Is There Anybody Out There?	Ella Glendining and Janine Marmot
2023 (26th)	Name Me Lawand	Edward Lovelace
2023 (26th)	Raging Grace	Paris Zarcilla and Chi Thai
2023 (26th)	Red Herring	Kit Vincent and Ed Owles
2024 (27th)	Grand Theft Hamlet	Pinny Grylls, Sam Crane, Julia Ton and Rebecca Wolff
2024 (27th)	The Ceremony	Jack King, Hollie Bryan and Lucy Meer
2024 (27th)	Restless	Jed Hart and Benedict Turnbull
2024 (27th)	Satu: The Year of the Rabbit	Joshua Trigg
2024 (27th)	Witches	Elizabeth Sankey, Jeremy Warmsley, Chiara Ventura and Manon Ardisson
