= British Independent Film Award for Best British Short Film =

British film award

- Awarded for: Best British Short Films
- Country: United Kingdom
- Presented by: BIFA
- First award: 2003
- Currently held by: Wander to Wonder (2024)
- Website: www.bifa.org.uk

The British Independent Film Award for British Short Film is an annual award given by the British Independent Film Awards (BIFA) to recognize the best British short film.

The award was first presented in the 2003 ceremony. The film Dad's Dead was the first recipient of the award, directed by Chris Shepherd and Maria Manton.

== Winners and nominees ==
=== 2000s ===
Year	Film	Recipient(s)
2003 (6th)	Dad's Dead	Chris Shepherd and Maria Manton
2003 (6th)	72 Faced Liar	Mark Waites
2003 (6th)	Extn. 21	Lizzie Oxby
2003 (6th)	Perfect	Rankin and Simon Ashdown
2003 (6th)	Salaryman 6	Jake Knight and Ryoko Tanaka
2004 (7th)	School of Life	Jake Polonsky and Malachi Smyth
2004 (7th)	6.6.04	Simon Hook and Jayne Kirkham
2004 (7th)	Brand Spanking	John-Paul Harney and Neil Jaworski
2004 (7th)	London Skies are Blue	Brendan Grant
2004 (7th)	Wasp	Andrea Arnold and Natasha Marsh
2005 (8th)	Six Shooter	Martin McDonagh, Kenton Allen and Mia Bays
2005 (8th)	Can't Stop Breathing	Amy Neil
2005 (8th)	Dupe	Chris Waitt and Henry Trotter
2005 (8th)	Pitch Perfect	J Blakeson
2006 (9th)	Cubs	Tom Harper
2006 (9th)	At the End of the Sentence	Marisa Zanotti and David Greig
2006 (9th)	Ex Mmemoria	Josh Appignanesi
2006 (9th)	The 10th Man	Sam Leifer
2006 (9th)	Who I Am and What I Want	Chris Shepherd, David Shrigley and Maria Manton
2007 (10th)	Dog Altogether	Paddy Considine and Diarmid Scrimshaw
2007 (10th)	Cherries	Tom Harper and Fiona Kissane
2007 (10th)	The Girls	Sebastian Godwin
2007 (10th)	What Does Your Daddy Do?	Martin Stitt
2007 (10th)	À bout de truffe	Tom Tagholm
2008 (11th)	Soft	Simon Ellis
2008 (11th)	Alex and Her Arse Truck	Sean Conway
2008 (11th)	Gone Fishing	Chris Jones and Ivan Francis Clements
2008 (11th)	Love Does Grow on Trees	Bevan Walsh and Geraldine Patten
2008 (11th)	Red Sands	David Procter, Geoff Bellhouse, Tom Turley and Andrea Farrena
2009 (12th)	Love You More	Sam Taylor-Wood, Patrick Marber, Caroline Harvey, Anthony Minghella and Adrian Sturges
2009 (12th)	Christmas with Dad	Conor McCormack
2009 (12th)	Leaving	Sam Hearn and Richard Penfold
2009 (12th)	Sidney Turtlebaum	Tristram Shapeero and Raphael Smith
2009 (12th)	Washdays	Simon Neal and Graham Lester-George

=== 2010s ===
Year	Film	Recipient(s)
2010 (13th)	Baby	Daniel Mulloy and Ohna Falby
2010 (13th)	Photograph of Jesus	Laurie Hill
2010 (13th)	Sign Language	Oscar Sharp and Stephen Follows
2010 (13th)	Sis	Deborah Haywood
2010 (13th)	The Road Home	Rahul Gandotra and Milja Fenger
2011 (14th)	Chalk	Martina Amati and Ilaria Bernardini
2011 (14th)	507	Ben Blaine and Chris Blaine
2011 (14th)	Rough Skin	Laura Lomas and Cathy Brady
2011 (14th)	Love at First Sight	Michael Davies and Julian Unthank
2011 (14th)	Rite	Michael Pearce
2012 (15th)	Volume	Mahalia Belo and Anna Ingeborg Topsøe
2012 (15th)	Friday	Sebastian Rice-Edwards and Anna Symon
2012 (15th)	Junk	Kirk Hendry
2012 (15th)	Skyborn	Jamie Magnus Stone
2012 (15th)	Swimmer	Lynne Ramsay
2013 (16th)	Z1	Gabriel Gauchet and Rungano Nyoni
2013 (16th)	Dr. Easy	Jason Groves, Chris Harding and Richard Kenworthy
2013 (16th)	Dylan's Room	Layke Anderson
2013 (16th)	Jonah	Kibwe Tavares and Jack Thorne
2013 (16th)	L'Assenza	Jonathan Romney
2014 (17th)	The Kárman Line	Oscar Sharp, Dawn King
2014 (17th)	Crocodile	Gaëlle Denis and Robin French
2014 (17th)	Emotional Fusebox	Rachel Tunnard
2014 (17th)	Keeping Up with the Joneses	Michael Pearce, Selina Lim and Megan Rubens
2014 (17th)	Slap	Nick Rowland and Islay Bell-Webb
2015 (18th)	Edmond	Nina Gantz
2015 (18th)	Balcony	Toby Fell-Holden
2015 (18th)	Crack	Peter King
2015 (18th)	Love Is Blind	Dan Hodgson
2015 (18th)	Manoman	Simon Cartwright
2016 (19th)	Jacked	Rene van Pannevis and Ashish Ghadiali
2016 (19th)	Mother	Leo Leigh
2016 (19th)	Over	Jörn Threlfall
2016 (19th)	Rate Me	Fyzal Boulifa
2016 (19th)	The Wrong End of the Stick	Terri Matthews and Chris Cornwell
2017 (20th)	Fish Story	Charlie Shackleton
2017 (20th)	1745	Gordon Napier and Morayo Akandé
2017 (20th)	The Entertainer	Jonathan Schey
2017 (20th)	Work	Aneil Karia
2017 (20th)	Wren Boys	Harry Lighton and John Fitzpatrick
2018 (21st)	The Big Day	Dawn Shadforth, Kellie Smith, Michelle Stein
2018 (21st)	Bitter Sea	Fateme Ahmadi and Emma Parsons
2018 (21st)	The Field	Sandhya Suri, Balthazar de Ganay and Thomas Bidegain
2018 (21st)	Pommel	Paris Zarcilla, Sebastian Brown and Ivan Kelava
2018 (21st)	To Know Him	Ted Evans, Kellie Smith, Jennifer Monks and Michelle Stein
2019 (22nd)	Anna	Dekel Berenson, Merlin Merton and Olga Beskhmelnitsyna
2019 (22nd)	Boiling Point	Bart Ruspoli, Philip Barantini, Grace Nelder, Gabriella Callea and James Cummings
2019 (22nd)	Goldfish	Hector Dockrill, Laura Dockrill, Benedict Turnbull and Harri Kamalanathan
2019 (22nd)	The Devil's Harmony	Dylan Holmes Williams, Jess O'Kane and Nathan Craig
2019 (22nd)	Serious Tingz	Abdou Cisse and Kieran Kenlock

=== 2020s ===
Year	Film	Recipient(s)
2020 (23rd)	The Long Goodbye	Aneil Karia, Riz Ahmed and Tom Gardner
2020 (23rd)	Filipiñana	Rafael Manuel and Naomi Pacifique
2020 (23rd)	Mandem	John Ogunmuyiwa and Emily Everdee
2020 (23rd)	Sudden Light	Sophie Littman and Tom Wood
2020 (23rd)	The Forgotten C	Molly Manning Walker and Jessi Gutch
2021 (24th)	Femme	Sam H Freeman, Ng Choon Ping, Sam Ritzenberg, Hayley Williams and Rienkje Attoh
2021 (24th)	Egúngún (Masquerade)	Olive Nwosu and Alex Polunin
2021 (24th)	Night of the Living Dead	Ida Melum, Laura Jayne Tunbridge, Hannah Kelso and Danielle Goff
2021 (24th)	Play It Safe	Mitch Kalisa and Chris Toumazou
2021 (24th)	Precious Hair & Beauty	John Ognmuyiwa, Sophia Gibber, Tony Longe and Lene Basager
2022 (25th)	Too Rough	Sean Lìonadh, Ross McKenzie and Alfredo Covelli
2022 (25th)	A Fox in the Night	Keeran Anwar Blessie and Benjamin Jacob Smith
2022 (25th)	Honesty	Roxy Rezvany, Emily Renée and Elly Camisa
2022 (25th)	Sandstorm	Seemab Gul and Abid Aziz Merchant
2022 (25th)	Scale	Joseph Pierce and Hélène Mitjavile
2023 (26th)	Festival of Slaps	Abdou Cissé, Cheri Darbon and George Telfer
2023 (26th)	Christopher at Sea	Tom CJ Brown, Amanda Miller, Hanna Stolarski, Emily-Jane Brown, Nick Read, Pierre Boivin, Constance Le Scouarnec and Laure Desmazières
2023 (26th)	Lions	Beru Tessema and Ama Ampadu
2023 (26th)	Muna	Warda Mohamed, Angela Moneke and Simon Hatton
2023 (26th)	The Talent	Thomas May Bailey, Emma D'Arcy and Ellen Spence
2024 (27th)	Wander to Wonder	Nina Gantz, Stienette Bosklopper, Simon Cartwright, Daan Bakker and Maarten Swart
2024 (27th)	Housewarming	Liam White and Guy Lindley
2024 (27th)	Meat Puppet	Eros V, Masha Thorpe and Leah Draws
2024 (27th)	A Move	Elahe Esmaili and Hossein Behboudi Rad
2024 (27th)	Delivery	Ben Lankester, Bophanie Lun and Joe Binks

== See also ==
- BAFTA Award for Best Short Film
- Academy Award for Best Live Action Short Film
