= British Independent Film Awards 2005 =

British awards ceremony

8th British Independent Film Awards
- Awarded for: Best in British independent film
- Date: 30 November 2005
- Site: Hammersmith Palais, London
- Hosted by: James Nesbitt
- Official website: www.bifa.film

Highlights
- Best Film: The Constant Gardener
- Most awards: The Constant Gardener (3)
- Most nominations: Mrs Henderson Presents & The Libertine (8 each)

The 8th British Independent Film Awards, held on 30 November 2005 and hosted by James Nesbitt, honoured the best British independent films of 2005. For the third year in succession, the award ceremony was held at the Hammersmith Palais, London.

As per previous years, only films intended for theatrical release, and those which had a public screening to a paying audience either on general release in the UK or at a British film festival between 1 October 2004 and 30 November 2005 were eligible for consideration. In addition, they needed either to have been produced / majority co-produced by a British company, or in receipt of at least 51% of their budget from a British source or qualified as a British Film under DCMS guidelines. Lastly, they could not be solely funded by a single studio.

Shortlists were announced on 25 October 2005. Mrs Henderson Presents and The Libertine led with eight nominations apiece. Winners in fourteen categories were selected from the shortlists and a further three were awarded entirely at the jury's discretion, whose make up included Michael Kuhn (chair), Mick Audsley, Alan Cumming, Amanda Donohoe, Mikael Hafstrom, Bryce Dallas Howard, Hugh Hudson, Tom Hunsinger, Beeban Kidron, Sue Latimer (Agent), Uberto Pasolini, Anne Reid and Ashley Walters.

== Winners and nominees ==
Best British Independent Film	Best Director
The Constant Gardener – Fernando Meirelles; The Descent – Neil Marshall; The Libertine – Laurence Dunmore; Mrs Henderson Presents – Stephen Frears; A Cock and Bull Story – Michael Winterbottom	Neil Marshall – The Descent; Fernando Meirelles – The Constant Gardener; Laurence Dunmore – The Libertine; Stephen Frears – Mrs Henderson Presents; Michael Winterbottom – A Cock and Bull Story
Best Actor	Best Actress
Ralph Fiennes – The Constant Gardener as Justin Quayle; Matthew Macfadyen – In My Father's Den as Paul Prior; Chiwetel Ejiofor – Kinky Boots as Lola / Simon; Johnny Depp – The Libertine as John Wilmot, 2nd Earl of Rochester; Bob Hoskins – Mrs Henderson Presents as Vivian Van Damm	Rachel Weisz – The Constant Gardener as Tessa Abbott-Quayle; Natasha Richardson – Asylum as Stella Raphael; Judi Dench – Mrs Henderson Presents as Laura Henderson; Emily Watson – Wah-Wah as Ruby; Joan Allen – Yes as She
Best Supporting Actor/Actress	Most Promising Newcomer
Rosamund Pike – The Libertine as Elizabeth Wilmot, Countess of Rochester; Bill Nighy – The Constant Gardener as Sir Bernard Pellegrin; Tom Hollander – The Libertine as Sir George Etherege; Kelly Reilly – Mrs Henderson Presents as Maureen; Rob Brydon – A Cock and Bull Story as Captain Toby Shandy	Emily Barclay – In My Father's Den as Celia; Rupert Friend – The Libertine as Billy Downs; Samina Awan – Love + Hate as Naseema; Alex Etel – Millions as Damian Cunningham; Thelma Barlow – Mrs Henderson Presents as Lady Margot Conway
Best Screenplay	Best International Independent Film
Frank Cottrell Boyce – Millions; Jeffrey Caine – The Constant Gardener; Tim Firth and Geoff Deane – Kinky Boots; Martin Sherman – Mrs Henderson Presents; Martin Hardy – A Cock and Bull Story	Downfall – Oliver Hirschbiegel; Broken Flowers – Jim Jarmusch; Crash – Paul Haggis; Secuestro Express – Jonathan Jakubowicz; The Woodsman – Nicole Kassell
Best Technical Achievement	Best Achievement in Production
Jon Harris – The Descent (Editing); César Charlone – The Constant Gardener (DOP / Cinematography); Ben Van Os – The Libertine (Production design); Sandy Powell – Mrs Henderson Presents (Wardrobe); Peter Christelis – A Cock and Bull Story (Editing)	Gypo – Jan Dunn; The Business – Allan Niblo and James Richardson; Guy X – Mike Downey; It's All Gone Pete Tong – Elizabeth Yake, Allan Niblo and James Richardson; Song of Songs – Gayle Griffiths
Douglas Hickox Award (Best Debut Director)	Best British Short Film
Annie Griffin – Festival; Julian Jarrold – Kinky Boots; Laurence Dunmore – The Libertine; Gaby Dellal – On a Clear Day; Richard E. Grant – Wah-Wah	Six Shooter – Martin McDonagh; Can't Stop Breathing – Amy Neil; Dupe – Chris Waitt; Pitch Perfect – J Blakeson
Best British Documentary	The Raindance Award
The Liberace of Baghdad – Sean McAllister; Andrew and Jeremy Get Married – Don Boyd; Black Sun – Gary Tarn; McLibel – Franny Armstrong and Ken Loach; Sisters in Law – Florence Ayisi and Kim Longinotto	Evil Aliens – Jake West; Billy Childish Is Dead – Graham Bendel; Sam Jackson's Secret Video Diary – Guy Rowland
The Variety Award	The Richard Harris Award
Helen Mirren	Tilda Swinton
Special Jury Prize
Sanford Lieberson

=== Films with multiple nominations ===
Nominations	Film
8	The Libertine
8	Mrs Henderson Presents
7	The Constant Gardener
5	A Cock and Bull Story
3	The Descent
3	Kinky Boots
2	In My Father's Den
