= British Independent Film Awards 2004 =

British awards ceremony

7th British Independent Film Awards
- Awarded for: Best in British independent film
- Date: 30 November 2004
- Site: Hammersmith Palais, London
- Hosted by: Richard Jobson
- Official website: www.bifa.film

Highlights
- Best Film: Vera Drake
- Most awards: Vera Drake (6)
- Most nominations: Dead Man's Shoes (8)

The 7th British Independent Film Awards, held on 30 November 2004 and hosted by Richard Jobson, honoured the best British independent films of 2004. For the second year in succession, the award ceremony was held at the Hammersmith Palais, London. Mike Leigh's period drama, Vera Drake swept the board, winning every category but one in which it was nominated.

As per previous years, only films intended for theatrical release, and those which had a public screening to a paying audience either on general release in the UK or at a British film festival between 1 October 2003 and 30 November 2004 were eligible for consideration. In addition, they needed either to have been produced / majority co-produced by a British company, or in receipt of at least 51% of their budget from a British source or qualified as a British Film under DCMS guidelines. Lastly, they could not be solely funded by a single studio.

Shortlists were announced by James Purefoy on 26 October 2004 at Soho House in London. Dead Man's Shoes led with eight nominations, but would fail to win any category in which it was nominated. Winners in fourteen categories were selected from the shortlists and a further three were awarded entirely at the jury's discretion, whose make up included Anthony Minghella, Helena Bonham Carter, Christian Slater, Cate Blanchett, Rosamund Pike, Lynne Ramsay, Sam Taylor-Wood, Skin, Mark Cousins, Laura De Casto (MD, Tartan Films), Antonia Bird, David Aukin, John Akomfrah and Stewart Till. A new category, The Raindance Award, honouring exceptional achievement for filmmakers working against the odds was introduced in this year.

== Winners and nominees ==
Best British Independent Film	Best Director
Vera Drake – Mike Leigh; Dead Man's Shoes – Shane Meadows; My Summer of Love – Paweł Pawlikowski; Shaun of the Dead – Edgar Wright; Touching the Void – Kevin Macdonald	Mike Leigh – Vera Drake; Kevin Macdonald – Touching the Void; Shane Meadows – Dead Man's Shoes; Roger Michell – Enduring Love; Paweł Pawlikowski – My Summer of Love
Best Actor	Best Actress
Phil Davis – Vera Drake as Stan Drake; Paddy Considine – Dead Man's Shoes as Richard; Daniel Craig – Enduring Love as Joe; Ian Hart – Blind Flight as Brian Keenan; Geoffrey Rush – The Life and Death of Peter Sellers as Peter Sellers	Imelda Staunton – Vera Drake as Vera Drake; Eva Birthistle – Ae Fond Kiss... as Roisin Hanlon; Scarlett Johansson – Girl with a Pearl Earring as Griet; Natalie Press – My Summer of Love as Mona; Anne Reid – The Mother as May
Best Supporting Actor/Actress	Most Promising Newcomer
Eddie Marsan – Vera Drake as Reg; Paddy Considine – My Summer of Love as Phil; Romola Garai – Rory O'Shea Was Here as Siobhán; Samantha Morton – Enduring Love as Claire; Gary Stretch – Dead Man's Shoes as Sonny	Ashley Walters – Bullet Boy as Ricky; Emily Blunt – My Summer of Love as Tamsin; Nick Frost – Shaun of the Dead as Ed; Toby Kebbell – Dead Man's Shoes as Anthony; Atta Yaqub – Ae Fond Kiss... as Casim Khan
Best Screenplay	Best International Independent Film
Edgar Wright and Simon Pegg – Shaun of the Dead; Shane Meadows and Paddy Considine – Dead Man's Shoes; Paul Laverty – Ae Fond Kiss...; Mike Leigh – Vera Drake; Christopher Markus and Stephen McFeely – The Life and Death of Peter Sellers	Oldboy – Park Chan-wook; Fahrenheit 9/11 – Michael Moore; Hero – Zhang Yimou; The Motorcycle Diaries – Walter Salles; Pieces of April – Peter Hedges
Best Technical Achievement	Best Achievement in Production
Touching the Void – Mike Eley (DOP / Cinematography); Bride and Prejudice – Eduardo Castro and Ralph Wheeler-Holes (Costume design); Dead Man's Shoes – Lucas Roche and Chris Wyatt (Editing); Code 46 – Mark Tildesley (Production design); Enduring Love – Haris Zambarloukos (DOP / Cinematography)	Vera Drake – Simon Channing Williams; Bride and Prejudice – Gurinder Chadha and Deepak Nayar; Code 46 – Andrew Eaton; Dead Man's Shoes – Mark Herbert and Louise Meadows; Girl with a Pearl Earring – Andy Paterson and Anand Tucker
Douglas Hickox Award (Best Debut Director)	Best British Short Film
John Crowley – Intermission; Saul Dibb – Bullet Boy; Matthew Vaughn – Layer Cake; Peter Webber – Girl with a Pearl Earring; Emily Young – Kiss of Life	School of Life – Jake Polonksy; 6.6.04 – Simon Hook; Brand Spanking – John-Paul Harney; London Fields Are Blue – Brendan Grant; Wasp – Andrea Arnold
Best British Documentary	The Raindance Award
Touching the Void – Kevin Macdonald; Aileen: Life and Death of a Serial Killer – Nick Broomfield; Drowned Out – Franny Armstrong; Peace One Day – Jeremy Gilley; Trollywood – Madeleine Farley	The Barn – Justin M. Seaman; Blinded – Eleanor Yule; Chicken Tikka Masala – Harmage Singh Kalirai
The Variety Award	The Richard Harris Award
J. K. Rowling	Bob Hoskins
Special Jury Prize
Norma Heyman

=== Films with multiple nominations ===
Nominations	Film
8	Dead Man's Shoes
7	Vera Drake
5	My Summer of Love
4	Enduring Love
4	Touching the Void
3	Ae Fond Kiss...
3	Girl with a Pearl Earring
3	Shaun of the Dead
2	Bullet Boy
2	Code 46
2	The Life and Death of Peter Sellers
