= Eileen Davies =

English actress

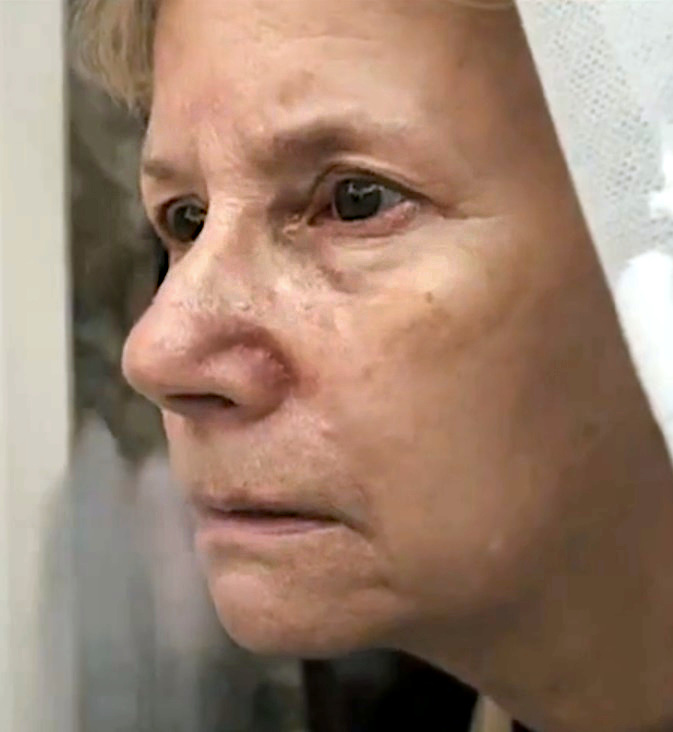
- Davies in Sightseers 2012.
- Born: 23 September 1948 (age 78); Hastings, East Sussex, England
- Occupation: Actress
- Years active: 1974–present

Eileen Davies (born 23 September 1948) is an English actress, nominated for Best Supporting Actress at the British Independent Film Awards 2012 for her performance in the film Sightseers, her roles have included “Flora McArdle” in the TV serial Coronation Street and as Joan Murfield in EastEnders and Molly in Allelujah (2022).

== Acting career ==
Eileen Davies was born and lives in Hastings, East Sussex. Eileen is one of a small group actors that have made appearances on both EastEnders and Coronation Street, the British TV serials. Davies has played 3 characters in the ITV TV serial Coronation Street, the role of Judge Anne Carmichael back in 2006, then as Celia Smethurst for 2 episodes in 2015, and more recently as Flora McArdle for a further 19 episodes in 2018. Davies also played the role of Joan Murfield in EastEnders for five episodes between 2017 and 2018. Elieen Davies was nominated for best supporting actress award at the British Independent Film Awards 2012 for her performance in the film Sightseers. However the award went to Olivia Colman.

In 2022, Davies starred in Allelujah, a film adaptation of Alan Bennett's play of the same name, alongside Jennifer Saunders, Russell Tovey, David Bradley, Derek Jacobi, and Judi Dench.

== Filmography ==
Year	Title	Role
1983	Meantime	Unemployment Benefit Clerk
1991	Where Angels Fear to Tread	Ethel
1993	Foreign Affairs (TV film)	Fortnum's Cashier
1995	A Village Affair	Sally Mott
1997	Gobble (TV film)	Androcles' Mum
2000	Seeing Red	Miss Ross
2004	May 33rd	Resident
2004	Vera Drake	Prison Officer
2009	Bright Star	Mrs. Bentley
2010	Another Year	Mourner
2010	Pulse (TV film)	Mrs Maddox
2011	The Holding	Store Owner
2012	Sightseers	Carol
2014	Mr. Turner	Lady Critics
2014	The Theory of Everything	Eileen Bond
2014	Hen Pecked (Short film)	main role
2015	Norfolk	Old Woman
2015	Mr. Holmes	Lady on Platform
2015	Miss You Already	Ace's Nan
2015	High-Rise	Mrs. Hillman
2016	Notes on Blindness (Documentary)	Madge Hull
2016	Grimsby	Mrs. Wearham (uncredited)
2016	Adult Life Skills	Jean
2016	FirstBorn	Elizabeth
2016	Prevenge	Jill
2016	This Beautiful Fantastic	Milly
2016	Those Who Are Lost (Short film)	Judith
2018	Peterloo	Mrs. Hay
2018	Welcome to Mercy	Mother Superior
2019	Affection (Short film)	Dot
2020	Bird Lady (Short film)	Bird Lady
2020	Tortoise (Short film)	Mim
2021	The Dig (film)	Florence Thompson
2021	Hold My Hand (Short film)	Esther
2021	Bringing back Goldeneye (film)	Ethan's Nan (main role)
2022	Allelujah (film)	Molly

=== TV ===
Year	Title	Role
1974	Village Hall	Other Voter (1 episode)
1976	Red Letter Day	Jean (1 episode)
1976	Within These Walls	Josephine (1 episode)
1977	1990	Mrs. Vickers (2 episodes)
1979	Kids	Annie Goole / Annie (6 episodes)
1982	The Agatha Christie Hour	Nurse (1 episode)
1985	Bleak House	Judy Smallweed (4 episodes)
1986–2006	The Bill (6 episodes)	Marcia Bailey / Mrs. Blake / Mrs. Bentley / Sandra Macintosh /Mary Goodman
1990	Waterfront Beat	Gail Pritchard (2 episodes)
1990	Keeping Up Appearances	The Gypsy (1 episode)
1991	The Sharp End	Carmichael's Landlady (1 episode)
1991	The House of Eliott	Supervisor (1 episode)
1991, 1997	The Ruth Rendell Mysteries	Marge / Waitress (2 episodes)
1992–1993	KYTV	House Owner (2 episodes)
1993	Body & Soul	Sister Julian (4 episodes)
1993	Waiting for God	Mrs Pershaw (1 episode)
1994	Middlemarch	Mrs. Barnacle (1 episode)
1996	Wycliffe	Hannah Creed (1 episode)
1996	Kavanagh QC	Anne Pearson (1 episode)
1998	London's Burning	Noreen (1 episode)
1999–2005	Midsomer Murders	Olive Beauvoisin / Estate Agent (3 episodes)
2001	Heartbeat	Glenda Marriot (1 episode)
2001	Judge John Deed	Gilly (1 episode)
2002	My Hero	(1 episode = Zero Tolerance)
2002	Always and Everyone	Relief Receptionist (1 episode)
2002	Foyle's War	Enid Smith (1 episode)
2003	The Royal	Mrs. Molly Lynson (1 episode)
2003	Hardware	Edna (1 episode)
2006	Afterlife	Auntie Vi (1 episode)
2006–2018	Coronation Street (23 episodes)	Flora McArdle / Celia Smethurst / Judge Anne Carmichael
2009–2020	Doctors (6 episodes)	Evonne Neary / Gaynor Purley / Doris Whiting / Joyce Barwick / Ruth Bletchley / Elsie Tucker
2013	The Job Lot	Linda Collins (1 episode)
2013	Chickens	Gladys (4 episodes)
2014	The Smoke	Carol (1 episode)
2014	Scott & Bailey	Joyce (1 episode)
2014	Remember Me	Nancy (3 episodes)
2015	Call the Midwife	Dora (1 episode)
2015	Home Fires	Anne Quarterbank (3 episodes)
2016	Notes on Blindness (Documentary)	Madge Hull
2016	Casualty	Jan Harvey (1 episode)
2016	Cold Feet	Nancy Harper (1 episode)
2016	So Awkward	Mrs. Edwards (3 episodes)
2017–2018	EastEnders	Joan Murfield (5 episodes)
2017	Witless	Mrs. Ambrose (1 episode)
2017	Liar	Sylvia (2 episodes)
2017	The End of the F***ing World	Stella (2 episodes)
2018	The Tunnel	Lilian Wright (2 episodes)
2019	Grantchester	Clara Carter (1 episode)
2021	Too Close	Julia de Cadenet (3 episodes)
2014 / 2021	Holby City	Joan Wessex (2014), Doreen Spicer (2021) -3 episodes

== Awards and nominations ==
Year	Award	Category	Nominated work	Result	Ref.
2012	British Independent Film Awards 2012	Best Supporting Actress	Sightseers	Nominated	
