= Sukie Smith =

British actress and musician (born 1964)

- Born: 23 September 1964 (age 61)
- Occupations: Actress, Musician
- Known for: EastEnders

Sukie Smith (born 23 September 1964) is a British actress and musician. Her credits include the role of Rachel Branning in EastEnders in 2006, as well as appearances in Peak Practice and Doctors. She also appeared in several films, including A Summer Story (1988), The Witches (1990) and Topsy Turvy (1999).

She is an accomplished composer and has written the soundtrack for Hush Your Mouth, the debut feature for Neophyte Films directed by Tom Tyrwhitt. Smith writes and records songs and poems, which are performed under the name Madam. She has collaborated with artists such as Saskia Volde to make the Tate Gallery exhibited piece "Placebo". Her shows are regularly attended by English artists such as Georgina Starr, Paul Noble and Tim Noble and Sue Webster.

== Filmography ==
Title	Character	Director
Film
The Witches	Marlene	Nicolas Roeg
Lawless Heart	Charlie	Neil Hunter, Tom Hunsinger
Topsy-Turvy	Clothilde	Mike Leigh
Peggy Su!	Rita	Frances Ann Solomon
A Summer Story	Betsy	Piers Haggard
Brand New-U	Sarah	Simon Pummell
Wedlock	Sonya	Devon Dixon
Enchanted April	Gladys	Mike Newell
Asking For It	Adele	Madeline Hall
Television
Casualty	Anna	BBC
Inspector Morse	Lorraine	ITV
Peak Practice	Kirsty Attwood	ITV
EastEnders	Rachel Branning	BBC
Doctors	Unknown	BBC
Hetty Feather	Madame Adeline	CBBC
