= Anna Brewster =

British model, actress

- Born: 2 May 1986 (age 40); Moseley, Birmingham, England
- Occupations: Actress; model
- Years active: 2003–present
- Children: 1
- Modelling information
- Height: 5 ft 6 in (1.68 m)
- Hair colour: Brown
- Eye colour: Hazel
- Agency: Mot Models

Anna Brewster is an English model and actress. Her last role was on the 2022 series El Presidente:The Corruption File.

== Early life ==
Anna Brewster is from Moseley, Birmingham to school teacher parents. She attended St Bernard's RC School, Kings Heath Junior School and Queensbridge School in Moseley before studying for her A levels at Solihull Sixth Form College. She has also studied at the Birmingham School of Speech and Drama.

== Career ==
=== Acting ===
Brewster starred as Anita Rutter in Anita and Me (2002), and played Doris in Mrs Henderson Presents (2005). In 2007, she portrayed the starring role of Kate Sherman in the E4 miniseries Nearly Famous, and appeared as "Anna Buckingham", a composite daughter of the ill-fated Edward Stafford, 3rd Duke of Buckingham in the television series The Tudors. Brewster also played Cynthia Grant in a 2009 episode of The Royal, and Abby in a 2011 episode of Luther.

In 2009, Brewster starred as Laura in the horror film The Reeds, which premiered at the After Dark Horrorfest. In 2010, she played supermodel Lydia Kane in the BBC series Material Girl. In 2012, Brewster played Georgina, one of the lead roles in the short film Volume, directed by Mahalia Belo. In 2013, she appeared in the BBC series Silent Witness as Deanna Collier.

In December 2015, Brewster appeared as Bazine Netal, a First Order spy in Star Wars: The Force Awakens. From 2015 to 2018, she portrayed Françoise-Athénaïs, Marquise de Montespan in the Canal+ series Versailles.

In 2020, Brewster starred as Shelby Dupree in the action thriller film The Last Days of American Crime. She portrayed Jane Boleyn in the 2021 TV series Anne Boleyn.

=== Modelling ===
Brewster was signed to Union Models at the age of 15. She modelled a range of women's clothing for designer label Ben Sherman; she was seen in the autumn/winter 2007 range throughout the UK. She appeared in a campaign for Aquascutum, Hermes for two seasons, Jigsaw A/W 2011, Sportsgirl and was the face of Links of London for a season. She has shot editorials for UK and American Glamour, Dazed & Confused, Italian Vogue, Japanese Vogue, Hercules, Plastique and Russian Vogue. During her career, she was signed to Hive Management in London, Marylin Agency in Paris, Next Models Paris, Monster Models in Milan, Muse Models in New York, Place Models, Hamburg, Scoop Models Copenhagen, Jills Management Belgium, House of Orange Amsterdam and Stockholmsgruppen in Stockholm. She is currently signed to MOT Models in London.

== Personal life ==
Brewster has a daughter, born in 2022.

== Filmography ==
=== Film ===
Year	Title	Role	Notes
2002	Anita & Me	Anita Rutter	
2005	Mrs Henderson Presents	Doris	
2010	The Reeds	Laura	
2011	Archaeology	Noah's Girlfriend	Short film
2012	Volume	Georgiana	Short film
2015	Star Wars: Episode VII - The Force Awakens	Bazine Netal	
2018	L'Ariel	Elma	Short film
2019	Hurt By Paradise	Tessa	
2020	Lola	Ruby	Short film
2020	The Last Days of American Crime	Shelby Dupree	
2020	LX 2048	Reena Bird	

=== Television ===
Year	Title	Role	Notes
2007	The Tudors	Anna Buckingham	2 episodes
2007	Katy Brand's Big Ass Show		
2007	Nearly Famous	Kate Ryman	6 episodes
2009	The Royal	Cynthia Grant	1 episode
2010	Material Girl	Lydia Kane	6 episodes
2011	Luther	Abby	1 episode
2012	Mr and Mrs Jones	Lisa	1 episodes
2013	Silent Witness	Deanna Collier	2 episodes
2014	Only Human	Danielle Lang	Television film
2015–2018	Versailles	Montespan / Madame de Montespan	21 episodes
2021	Anne Boleyn	Lady Rochford / Jane Boleyn	Miniseries
2022	El Presidente: The Corruption Game	Faye Bossard	7 Episodes
