= Dream Horse =

2020 sports comedy-drama film

- Theatrical release poster
- Directed by: Euros Lyn
- Screenplay by: Neil McKay
- Produced by: Katherine Butler; Tracy O’Riordan
- Starring: Toni Collette; Damian Lewis; Owen Teale; Joanna Page; Karl Johnson; Steffan Rhodri; Anthony O'Donnell; Nicholas Farrell; Siân Phillips
- Cinematography: Erik Wilson
- Edited by: Jamie Pearson
- Music by: Benjamin Woodgates
- Production companies: Cornerstone Films; Film4; Raw; Ingenious; Topic Studios; FFilm Cymru Wales
- Distributed by: Warner Bros. Pictures (United Kingdom); Bleecker Street (United States)
- Release dates: 24 January 2020 (Sundance); 21 May 2021 (United States); 4 June 2021 (United Kingdom)
- Running time: 113 minutes
- Countries: United Kingdom; United States
- Language: English
- Box office: $6.6 million

Dream Horse is a 2020 sports comedy-drama film directed by Euros Lyn from a screenplay by Neil McKay. The film stars Toni Collette, Damian Lewis, Owen Teale, Joanna Page, Karl Johnson, Steffan Rhodri, Anthony O'Donnell, Nicholas Farrell, and Siân Phillips, and follows the true story of Dream Alliance, a horse that raced in the Welsh Grand National. It had previously been the subject of the documentary, Dark Horse: The Incredible True Story of Dream Alliance.

The film tells the true story of Dream Alliance, an unlikely race horse bred by Welsh barmaid and cashier Jan Vokes. With very little money and no experience, Jan convinces her neighbours to chip in a bit each week to help raise Dream in the hopes he can compete with the racing elites.

Dream Horse had its world premiere at the Sundance Film Festival on 24 January 2020 and was released in the United States on 21 May 2021, by Bleecker Street and in the United Kingdom on 4 June 2021, by Warner Bros. Pictures.

== Plot ==
Empty nesters Jan and Brian Vokes lead an uneventful, mundane life in Wales. Jan works two jobs as a supermarket cashier and a barmaid, and regularly helps her elderly parents, while the arthritic Brian stays home.

During a shift at the pub, Jan overhears Howard Davies telling stories about a winning horse he once owned. Curious, she finds a breeders’ guidebook through an ad in Horse and Hound and does her research. Telling Brian about her idea to breed a racehorse, he thinks she's mad, as they have only had experience breeding pigeons.

Soon the couple are buying Rewbell, once a racehorse but sold to them as a brood mare for £300. In the pub, Jan asks Howard for help choosing a stud, and he's not encouraging. She aims to form a syndicate of locals contributing £10 per week. Passing out flyers all over town, Jan's evening pitch meeting initially seems to be an epic failure, but enough locals express an interest to form a 20-member syndicate. At the farm, while awaiting the insemination, Jan tells Brian that she needs this project to motivate her.

Rewbell doesn't survive the birth, but her foal is born soundly, and the syndicate agrees to name the colt Dream Alliance. After Howard has a change of heart and deems the horse to be ready, Jan and Brian take Dream Alliance to trainer Phillip Hobbs, who takes him on for a trial period. Considered race-ready, Dream Alliance rises through the ranks with grit and determination. Howard, however, keeps his involvement with the syndicate a secret from his wife Angela, as his previous investment resulted in nearly bankrupting their family; angered when the truth comes out, she implies that she will leave Howard if this new syndicate fails.

When the horse wins the King Edward's Challenge, another breeder offers to buy him, which Jan, Brian and Howard disregard. However, some of the others in the syndicate are angered at her quick refusal. Feeling inspired by the spirit of the community, Howard quits his hated accounting job and opens his own firm, placing a further strain on his marriage to Angela. Jan asks why he quit his job and he explains he wanted to do better than his father, who gave up trying to be a jockey and spent his life working in a factory.

A setback comes when Dream Alliance falls and incurs a serious tendon injury during a race at Aintree, requiring an immediate medical decision from the syndicate. When told of the hefty prospective financial losses if the horse dies, members who are focused on the bottom line argue for the motion of putting Dream Alliance to sleep, but Jan passionately reminds them that he has brought them hope and have given them pride, and the decision is ultimately made to attempt surgery. Whilst Jan awaits news about the treatment, her father dies. After hours of medical care and days of rest and stem cell treatment, Dream Alliance makes a recovery that is deemed as "miraculous". Hobbs further believes not only that the tendon is stronger than ever, but that Dream Alliance could even race in the upcoming Welsh Grand National.

Jan fears for the horse's well-being, but the rest of the syndicate overrules her, including Brian. Jan is upset by this, and confronts Brian in private, but he convinces her that Dream Alliance has racing is in his blood. Most of the syndicate travels to watch the Welsh Grand National, while others and the rest of the community watch the race being broadcast; Angela accompanies Howard, along with their two children, having had a conversation with Jan whilst being served by her at the supermarket. After a performance of the Welsh National Anthem by Katherine Jenkins, the race begins, and Dream Alliance comes from behind to win: the syndicate members celebrate, and during a quiet moment at the side of the track Angela tells Howard that his father would be proud of him. The syndicate returns to Wales to receive a heroes' welcome with a street party, and title cards tell of Dream Alliance going on to continue racing before retiring in 2012, and Jan and Brian starting a new syndicate with Howard with a new project as of 2019.

During the end credits, various cast members are shown singing "Delilah" alongside the real-life Jan and Brian Vokes, Howard Davies, and Maureen, who finally gets to meet her hero Clare Balding.

== Cast ==
- Toni Collette as Jan Vokes
- Damian Lewis as Howard Davies
- Owen Teale as Brian "Daisy" Vokes
- Joanna Page as Angela Davies
- Karl Johnson as Kerby
- Nicholas Farrell as Philip Hobbs
- Siân Phillips as Maureen
- Steffan Rhodri as Gerwyn
- Anthony O'Donnell as Maldwyn
- Peter Davison as Lord Avery
- Di Botcher as Nerys
- Alex Jordan as Johnson White
- Max Hutchinson as James Lingsford
- Lynda Baron as Elsie
- Asheq Akhtar as Peter
- Darren Evans as Goose
- Katherine Jenkins OBE as herself
- Clare Balding OBE as herself

== Production ==
It was announced in March 2019 that Euros Lyn was directing the film, with Toni Collette and Damian Lewis cast in the lead roles. Owen Teale, Joanna Page, Nicholas Farrell, Siân Phillips and Karl Johnson were added in May.

Filming began by May 2019 in Wales.

== Release ==
Dream Horse had its world premiere at the Sundance Film Festival on 24 January 2020. The film was originally scheduled to be released in the United Kingdom on 17 April 2020, and in the United States on 1 May 2020, but these were delayed due to the COVID-19 pandemic. The film was eventually released to theaters on May 21, 2021, and was released on DVD, July 20, 2021.

== Reception ==
=== Box office ===
Dream Horse grossed $796,000 from 1,254 theaters in its opening weekend. Females made up 62% of the audience, with 85% being over the age of 25.

=== Critical response ===
On the review aggregator website Rotten Tomatoes, 88% of 132 reviews are positive, with an average rating of 6.7/10. The site's critics consensus reads, "Spurred on by an excellent Toni Collette, Dream Horse has a comfortably crowd-pleasing gait that makes the most of the story's familiar formula." On Metacritic, the film has a weighted average score of 68 out of 100, based on 30 critics, indicating "generally favorable" reviews. According to PostTrak, 81% of audience members gave the film a positive score, with 57% saying they would definitely recommend it.

== See also ==
- List of films about horse racing
- List of films about horses
