= Anna (2019 short film) =

- Directed by: Dekel Berenson
- Written by: Dekel Berenson
- Produced by: Dekel Berenson; lga Beskhmelnitsyna; Paul Wesley; Andrew Carlberg; Elad Keidan; Natalia Libet
- Starring: Svetlana Alekseevna Barandich; Anastasia Vyazovskaya; Eric Ross Gilliatt; Alina Chornogub; Liana Khobelia
- Cinematography: Volodymyr Ivanov
- Edited by: Yegor Troyanovsky
- Production companies: Three Color Films; ESSE Production House; Blue Shadow Films
- Distributed by: 168 Wardour Filmworks
- Release date: May 24, 2019
- Running time: 15 minutes
- Countries: Ukraine; Israel; United Kingdom
- Language: English

Anna (Ukrainian: «Анна») is a live-action short film directed by London-based Israeli filmmaker Dekel Berenson. This 15 minute film addresses real-world social and humanitarian issues by depicting the "Love Tours" organised in Ukraine for foreign men who are searching for a female partner to take home. Anna premiered in competition at the 72nd Cannes Film Festival, won a BIFA, was shortlisted for a BAFTA and was nominated for both the Israeli Film Academy Awards and Ukrainian Film Academy Awards. The film was also included in the National Competition program of the 48th Kyiv International Film Festival Molodist.

== Plot ==
Anna, a middle-aged single mother living in war-torn Eastern Ukraine, is desperate for a change. While at work in a meat processing plant, she hears a radio advertisement to attend a party organised for foreign men who are touring the country, searching for love. Once there along with her daughter, Anna faces the realities of old age, and understands men's real intentions. They both become aware of the absurdity and indignity of the situation.

== Cast ==
- Svetlana Alekseevna Barandich as Anna
- Anastasia Vyazovskaya as Alina
- Eric Ross Gilliatt as Eric
- Alina Chornogub as the translator
- Liana Khobelia as the party organiser

== Reception ==
The film has received numerous awards, and screened at about 350 festivals and selected more than 160 times.

Year	Presenter/Festival	Award/Category	Status
2020	BAFTA	British Short Film	Shortlisted
2020	Awards of the Israeli Film Academy	Best Short Feature Film	Nominated
2019	British Independent Film Awards (BIFA)	Best British Short Film	Won
2019	DC Shorts Film Festival	Outstanding International Narrative Film	Won
2019	72nd Cannes Film Festival	Palme d'or - Best Short Film	Nominated
