= Jamael Westman =

British actor (born 1991)

- Born: Jamael Anwar Hermitt; 1991 (age 34–35); Lambeth, London, England
- Education: RADA (BA)
- Occupation: Actor
- Years active: 2013–present

Jamael Anwar Hermitt-Westman (born December 1991) is a British actor. He is best known for starring as the title role in the West End production of Lin-Manuel Miranda's musical Hamilton, which earned him a Laurence Olivier Award nomination.

== Early life and education ==
Westman was born in Lambeth, London, to football coach Wallace Hermitt and lecturer Susan Westman. He spent the first ten years of his life in Brixton before gentrification pushed his family out to Streatham and later Croydon. His younger brother, Myles, is also an actor. Their parents separated when Westman was a teenager. He is the grandson of football coach Barry Hermitt; Westman's paternal grandparents immigrated to England from Jamaica as part of the Windrush generation. His mother, from Gloucestershire, is of Irish descent.

He attended St Joseph's College in Upper Norwood. He later went on to graduate from the Royal Academy of Dramatic Art (RADA) in 2016.

== Career ==
=== Theatre ===
Westman started out in pantomimes and community theatre projects. Before Hamilton, he had only acted in two professional stage productions, The White Devil at Shakespeare's Globe and Torn at the Royal Court.

In June 2017, it was announced Westman was cast as the lead in the West End production of Lin-Manuel Miranda's Hamilton at the Victoria Palace Theatre, a role he has since played both on the West End and on tour. He was due to appear in a new production in Los Angeles of Hamilton from 12 March to 22 November 2020, at the Hollywood Pantages Theatre, but the production was suspended on the date of its intended debut in response to the COVID-19 pandemic. The show eventually premiered in Los Angeles on 17 August 2021.

=== Television and film ===
Westman made his onscreen debut with a guest role in a 2013 episode of Casualty. He appeared in the films Brand New-U (2015) and Animals (2019). He has also been in several short films, such as Kebab (2014), Wilton (2016), A Poem for Every Autumn Day (2020), and Ice Cream & Doughnuts (2021).

In 2021 he appeared in the Channel 5 miniseries Anne Boleyn as Jane Seymour's ambitious brother, Edward Seymour, 1st Duke of Somerset. He was next cast in the role of Dr George Spencer in the six-part drama The Essex Serpent on Apple TV+, starring Claire Danes and Tom Hiddleston.

== Personal life ==
Westman has been outspoken about racism. In 2019, he said Britain needed to confront its colonial past, and in 2020 he was one of the big names in theatre to sign a letter to industry leaders calling for "urgent reform" to tackle racism and the lack of diversity in the profession.

== Filmography ==
=== Film ===
Year	Title	Role	Notes
2015	Brand New-U	Kemal	
2019	Animals	Leo	
2021	Ice Cream & Doughnuts	Robbie	Short film
2023	Good Grief	Terrance	
2025	Hedda	David	
2027	Star Wars: Starfighter †	TBA	Post-production

=== Television ===
Year	Title	Role	Notes
2013	Casualty	Dex Woods	Episode: "Human Resources"
2020	On the Edge	Michael	Miniseries; Episode: "BBW"
2021	Anne Boleyn	Edward Seymour	Episode #1.1
2022	The Essex Serpent	Dr. George Spencer	5 episodes

== Stage ==
Year	Title	Role	Notes
2016	Torn	Brotha	Royal Court Theatre, London
2017	The White Devil	Marcello	Globe Theatre, London
2017–2022	Hamilton	Alexander Hamilton	Victoria Palace Theatre, London; Hollywood Pantages Theatre, Los Angeles (Eliza Tour)
2022	Patriots	Alexander Litvinenko	Almeida Theatre
2024	London Tide	Eugene Wrayburn	National Theatre (Lyttelton), London
2026	An Ideal Husband	Lord Goring	Lyric Hammersmith

== Awards and nominations ==
He was nominated for Best Actor at the Laurence Olivier Awards in 2018 for his performance in Hamilton. That same year he was also nominated for the Emerging Talent Award at the Evening Standard Theatre Awards, the oldest theatrical awards ceremony in the United Kingdom, which he won. He was a 2018 Screen International Stars of Tomorrow pick.
