= Scale (film) =

Animated short film directed by Joseph Pierce

- Directed by: Joseph Pierce
- Written by: Joseph Pierce; Nicolas Pleskof
- Produced by: Helene Mitjavile; Chris Hees; Jiri Konecny; Jérémie Mazurek; Christophe Beaujean
- Starring: Sam Spruell; Zahra Ahmadi; Evelyn Neghabian Pierce; Minou Neghabian Pierce
- Music by: Lung Dart
- Production company: Melocoton Films
- Distributed by: Salaud Morisset
- Release date: May 2022
- Running time: 15mn
- Countries: France; United Kingdom; Czech Republic; Belgium

Scale is a 2022 French animated short film directed by Joseph Pierce. The film debuted at the 2022 Critics Week at Cannes Film Festival and was produced by Melocoton Films (France), in co-production with Bridge Way Films (UK), Endorfilm (Czech Republic) and Ozù Productions (Belgium). Scale has received several nominations and awards, including a nomination for Best British Short Film at the 2022 British Independent Film Awards and winning the Golden Zagreb Award at the 2023 Zagreb World Festival of Animated Films. In August 2022, the film won the Oscar-qualifying award for Best Animation at HollyShorts Film Festival, and became eligible for the 96th Academy Awards. The film is also in the official selection for the 2024 César Awards.

== Background ==
The film is an adaptation of the homonymous novella written by Will Self as part of the short story collection Grey Area (1994). Pierce, who read the story as a teenager, felt compelled to adapt the story into an ambitious animated short.

== Cast ==
- Sam Spruell as Will
- Zahra Ahmadi as Eden
- Evelyn Neghabian Pierce as Edith
- Minou Neghabian Pierce as Lyla

== Plot ==
An opium-addicted father obsessed with the UK highway system narrates his descent into crippling addiction and isolation, and how he lost his sense of scale.

== Reception ==
Since its release, the film has been selected for various festivals around the world:

Year	Award	Award/Category	Status	Ref
2022	Annecy International Animation Film Festival	Cristal Award	Nominated	
2022	HollyShorts Film Festival	Best Animation	Won	
2022	British Independent Film Awards	Best British Short Film	Nominated	
2022	Guanajuato International Film Festival	Best Animated Short Film	Nominated	
2022	Raindance Film Festival	Best Animated Short	Nominated	
2022	Vila do Conde International Short Film Festival	Grand Prize for Best Animation	Won	
2022	Les Arcs Film Festival	Grand Prix for Best Short Film	Won	
2023	Clermont-Ferrand International Short Film Festival	Audience Award	Won	
2023	Cinema Jove - Valencia International Film Festival	Moon of Valencia Award	Nominated	
2023	Brussels International Animation Film Festival	Press Award	Won	
