= A Summer Story =

- Theatrical release poster
- Directed by: Piers Haggard
- Screenplay by: Penelope Mortimer
- Based on: "The Apple Tree" by John Galsworthy
- Produced by: Danton Rissner
- Starring: James Wilby; Imogen Stubbs; Susannah York; Kenneth Colley
- Cinematography: Kenneth MacMillan
- Edited by: Ralph Sheldon
- Music by: Georges Delerue
- Production company: ITC Entertainment
- Distributed by: Atlantic Entertainment Group
- Release dates: 23 July 1988 (South Korea); 11 August 1988 (New York City); 28 October 1988 (Ireland)
- Running time: 95 minutes
- Country: United Kingdom
- Language: English

A Summer Story is a 1988 British drama film directed by Piers Haggard and written by Penelope Mortimer, based on John Galsworthy’s 1916 short story "The Apple Tree". Starring James Wilby, Imogen Stubbs and Susannah York, the plot takes place in 1902 and 1920, wherein a young gentleman visiting a rural area had an intense love affair with a village girl. Eighteen years later, he is passing that way again.

== Plot ==
In the summer of 1902, Frank Ashton, an educated young barrister from London, is on a walking holiday in Devon with a friend. When he falls and twists his ankle, Ashton is helped at a nearby farmhouse in Dartmoor and stays there for a few days to recover, while his friend goes on. During his stay, he quickly falls for the village girl who looks after him, Megan David. Joe Narracombe, Megan's cousin who is wary of refined men like Ashton, wants Megan for himself. Ashton, seeking ways to get close to Megan, goes to the local sheep shearing festivities and learns to shear his first sheep. That night, Megan professes she returns Ashton's feelings and they consummate their relationship.

After a fight with Joe over Megan, Ashton leaves the farm and makes arrangements to meet again with her. He takes the train to the seaside resort town of Torquay to cash a cheque at a bank, after promising to return the next morning and take Megan away with him and marry her. On arrival in the town, Ashton finds a branch of his bank, but it will not cash his cheque, insisting on first contacting his branch in London. Ashton agrees to wait in town until the bank can be contacted. While walking around, Ashton runs into Halliday, an old school friend staying at a local hotel with his three sisters. The eldest of Halliday's sisters, Stella, takes a liking to Ashton. Thanks to the bank's delays, Ashton misses the train he needed to make his rendezvous with Megan.

When Halliday asks why Ashton is so anxious, Ashton tells him about Megan and how he can't live without her. Halliday cautions Ashton against rash decisions when it comes to love, warning him that he is getting caught up in the idealism of romance rather than reality, including the fact that he would be uprooting Megan from the only home she knows.

The following day, Ashton spends more time with Halliday and his sisters. Stella flirts with him, suggesting his missed train must have been due to fate. He begins to have second thoughts about marrying Megan. Back in Dartmoor, Megan holds onto the hope that Ashton will return for her and she goes to wait at a rendezvous spot they had agreed upon. After hours of waiting for him with no success, she decides to travel to Torquay to look for Ashton.

While talking with Stella on the beach, Ashton suddenly sees Megan walking amongst the crowds. He makes up a ruse to send Stella back to the hotel, then follows the unsuspecting Megan. He trails her down a street, nearly catching up to her. Right as she is about to turn around, she almost catches a glimpse of Ashton, but he hides behind a building until she is gone.

Eighteen years later, Ashton is married to Stella and they are motoring through Devon. They have no children. Ashton visits the farm where he seduced Megan and is greeted by Jim, a farm hand he befriended long ago. Ashton learns that Megan returned to Dartmoor heartbroken about losing him. She died soon after giving birth to a son, whom she named "Francis," or Frank. Ashton is taken to see Megan's grave, which is at the spot where they had first met. She had asked to be buried there, to wait for his return. As he motors away with Stella, Ashton passes by a young man who is herding sheep. The man gives a friendly smile to Ashton, and as he leaves, he realizes it is Megan's son Frank.

== Cast ==
- James Wilby as Frank Ashton
- Imogen Stubbs as Megan David
- Susannah York as Mrs. Narracombe
- Kenneth Colley as Jim
- Jerome Flynn as Joe Narracombe
- Lee Billett as Nick
- Oliver Perry as Rick
- Harry Burton as Garton
- Sophie Ward as Stella Halliday
- John Elmes as Mr. Halliday
- Camilla Power as Sabina Halliday
- Juliette Fleming as Freda Halliday
- Sukie Smith as Betsy
- John Savident as Bank Clerk
- Rachel Joyce as Post Office Girl
- Patrick Morris as Pierrot 1
- Paul Allain as Pierrot 2
- Christopher Majeika as Pierrot 3
- James Wilson as Pierrot 4
- Perry Cree as Pierrot 5

== Production ==
In 1946, Jesse L. Lasky announced he would make a film of the story from a script by DeWitt Bodeen at RKO, but nothing came of it. In 1969, Kenneth Hyman said he wanted to make his directorial debut with a film version of the story, which would be made for under $800,000, but again no movie resulted.

In 1971 Peter Bogdanovich said he had wanted to make a film of the story "since he was about 16", but wanted to change the setting to Maine.

In 1987, production was at last funded, based on a script by Penelope Mortimer, and James Wilby, Imogen Stubbs, and Susannah York were cast in the leading roles. Despite being set on Dartmoor, the rural scenes were mostly filmed on Exmoor, specifically at Lyncombe Farm. Other scenes were filmed in Exeter, Dartmouth, and Sidmouth.

Penelope Mortimer had written the film script long before, in the 1960s, when she was working as a screenwriter. "I took the money and ran and totally forgot about it," she said in 1988. "I couldn't remember a thing about it", adding that "the last apple got written out [of the script] a week before shooting - it was the wrong time of year." She made some changes to the original story, including adding a sheep-shearing party ("I thought, something has to happen", Mortimer commented), and the producers decided that Megan and Frank needed to make love, resulting in Megan having a son. "I don't know what Galsworthy would have thought", said Mortimer. "I was terribly anxious that the couple should never have it off. But oh no they had to have all those muscles writhing in the moonlight."

Mortimer called the character of Frank Ashton "very much a Galsworthy character, someone with the guilt of not living up to his own expectations. Such a bastard but with the best gentlemanly motives... such a yuppie. I'm sure there are still plenty of young men with their BMWs who act much the same way." She said the character of Megan was "a bit of a hoyden... pretty amoral really but with a lot of guts. And Imogen Stubbs... is sensational."

== Critical reception ==
Critics lauded the film's cast and the scenery, but criticized the screenplay as wading into tearjerker territory. Variety called the film a "beautifully made pastoral romance", and commented, "Stage actress Stubbs is a real find as the heartbroken heroine, bringing a modern strength to the period role, while Wilby is a sympathetic version of the archetypal weak young aristocrat."

Sheila Benson of Los Angeles Times also gave acclaim to Stubbs, calling her a "magical screen presence", but critiqued the framing device that brings Ashton back to Devon 18 years later, saying, "It sets a mucilaginous tone to what should be a minor-key tragedy; the sharp differences of class and privilege have been sandpapered down into bucolic quaintness and banality." In Video Review, Molly Haskell wrote, "This story of a tragic betrayal of a loving heart rolls with the inexorable force of a runaway railway train as it unfurls one unforgettable image after another of unrequited commitment. It is here that writer Mortimer's detailed characterizations come to the rescue of an otherwise obvious situation". She concluded, "The fiercely expressive beauty of Stubbs rescues this material from whimpering sentimentality".
