= John M. Hull =

British academic

John Hull
- Born: John Martin Hull; 22 April 1935; Corryong, Victoria, Australia
- Died: 28 July 2015 (aged 80); Birmingham, England, U.K.
- Education: General arts, education, theology
- Alma mater: University of Melbourne, University of Cambridge, University of Birmingham
- Occupations: Professor of Religious Education at University of Birmingham; later Honorary Professor of Practical Theology in The Queen's Foundation, Birmingham
- Years active: In higher education: 1966–2015
- Known for: Modern approach to RE in schools Editor of BJRE, 1971 to 1996; Co-founder of ISREV, 1978, and its General Secretary until 2010; Writings on blindness and disability Training future CofE & Methodist ministers in prophetic witness
- Title: Emeritus Professor of Religious Education
- Awards: Litt.D. (Cambridge) for work on RE; Hon. D.Theol. (Frankfurt) Dr. H.C. (Vrije Universiteit Amsterdam); Festschrift Education, Religion, & Society
- Website: www.johnmhull.co.uk

John Martin Hull (22 April 1935 – 28 July 2015) was emeritus Professor of Religious Education at the University of Birmingham. He was the author of a number of books and many articles in the fields of religious education, practical theology and disability. The latter interest arose from his experiences, and personal and theological reflections, on becoming blind in mid-career. He edited the British Journal of Religious Education for 25 years, and co-founded the International Seminar on Religious Education and Values, of which he was general secretary for 32 years, and president emeritus at the time of his death. After retirement he pursued a further interest as Honorary Professor of Practical Theology at the Queen's Foundation for Ecumenical Theological Education, Birmingham, England.

== Early life ==
John Hull was born in Corryong, Victoria, Australia, the son of John Eaglesfield Hull (born in Leicester, England, U.K.), a Methodist minister, and Madge Enid Hull, a teacher. He received a general arts degree from the University of Melbourne and became a school teacher, but after three years teaching at Caulfield Grammar School, Melbourne, whilst also obtaining a post-graduate BEd, he moved to England in 1959 to study theology at Fitzwilliam College, Cambridge, followed by Cheshunt College. He became domiciled in the UK in 1962.

== Work on religious education ==
After Cambridge and four years as head of religious education at a London grammar school, Hull moved to Birmingham to train religious education teachers, first at Westhill College, then at the University of Birmingham, which awarded him a PhD in theology in 1969.

From 1971 to 1996 he was editor of the British Journal of Religious Education, and he remained a member of its UK editorial board until 2009. He served two terms as president of the National Christian Education Council. In 1978 he was the co-founder with John H. Peatling (US) of the International Seminar on Religious Education and Values, by its 2012 session an association of over 240 religious education scholars from 36 countries, which meets in a different country every other year. He was its general secretary from 1978 to 2010, when he was appointed president emeritus.

In 1989, Hull was appointed to a personal chair as Professor of Religious Education in the University of Birmingham, the first such in the United Kingdom. In 1990 he was also appointed dean of its Faculty of Education and Continuing Studies. In his time in Birmingham, he wrote many papers and contributed over 50 chapters to books. Books on religious education which he wrote or edited include:

- Sense and Nonsense about God (1974). Study guide for older secondary and college students on the philosophy of religion.
- School Worship: An Obituary (1975). Seminal discussion of the philosophy and practice of school worship; arguing that it should be replaced by an assembly devoted to spiritual and moral development of the school.
- New Directions in Religious Education (1982). Seventeen outstanding articles from the British Journal of Religious Education, selected and commented on by Journal Editor John Hull.
- Studies in Religion and Education (1984). A collection of Hull's academic articles published between 1969 and 1982.
- What Prevents Christian Adults from Learning? (1985). "When we find that Christian adults often seem to stop learning and developing in their faith, one must ask why."
- The Act Unpacked: The Meaning of the 1988 Education Reform Act for Religious Education (1989). Drew attention to the world religions approach of the legislation, whereas publicity had focussed on the Christianity aspect.
- Mishmash: Religious Education in Multi-Cultural Britain, a study in metaphor (1991). The debate on the 1988 Education Reform Act had used this metaphor of disgusting food to attack a world religions approach to religious education. This booklet analyses this rhetoric, tracing it back to an elitist view.
- God-Talk With Young Children: Notes for Parents & Teachers (1991). Thirty-three conversations with children, mostly about God; with interpretation and suggestions.
- A Gift to the Child (1991)(with others). Teachers' Source Book.
- Utopian Whispers: Moral, Religious and Spiritual Values in School (1998). BJRE editorials, originally written and now selected by John Hull; covering a period of major changes in religious education in Britain.
- Glaube und Bildung (2000). Some of Hull's writings on 'Faith and Education', edited and translated into German. (Book not available in English.)

Hull lectured on religious education or the consideration of disability in many countries. For example, in the three years after he became a professor emeritus at the University of Birmingham in 2002, he spoke at meetings in Canada, Germany, Hungary, Ireland, Malta, The Netherlands, Norway, Taiwan and the United States, as well as at many events in England.

In 1992, Hull received the William Rainey Harper Award of the Religious Education Association of the United States and Canada, given for outstanding contributions to the study of religion in society, especially religious education. A festschrift was commissioned to mark his 70th birthday: Education, Religion, and Society: Essays in Honour of John M. Hull (2005). Another book has been published as a tribute to "his exceptional academic achievements in the field of religious education": Religious Education as Encounter: A Tribute to John M. Hull (2009).

In 2006 the University of Cambridge awarded Hull the higher doctorate of Litt.D. in respect of his published works on religious education. His work has also been recognised internationally by the award of the honorary doctorates of Hon.D.Theol. (Frankfort) and Dr.H.C. (Free University of Amsterdam).

== Work on blindness and disability ==
Hull became blind in 1983, and beyond his academic work on religious education was best known as the author of the autobiographical account of blindness, Touching the Rock: An Experience of Blindness (1990). This was later republished with additional material as On Sight and Insight: A Journey into the World of Blindness (1997); which tends to emphasise features of the state of blindness rather than the experience of losing sight. Of this work, the neurologist and writer on disability Oliver Sacks commented in The New Yorker, "There has never been, to my knowledge, so minute and fascinating (and frightening) an account of how not only the outer eye, but the 'inner eye', gradually vanishes with blindness; of the steady loss of visual memory, visual imagery, visual orientation, visual concepts... of the steady advance or journey... into the state which he calls 'deep blindness'."

Hull's experiences led him into further consideration of blindness and disability, particularly in a Christian context on which he wrote a number of challenging articles. He also wrote another book, In the Beginning there was Darkness: A Blind Person's Conversations with the Bible (2001) in which he interpreted the Bible as the product of a sighted culture, with a negative attitude towards blindness.

In 1988, Hull initiated Cathedrals through Touch and Hearing, a scheme which has provided 17 English cathedrals with wooden models and elevated ground plans for the benefit of blind visitors. In 2003 the Vice President of the Republic of China presented him with a Global Love of Life Award given by the Chou Ta-Kuan Cultural and Education Foundation of Taiwan to honour those who have contributed to the cause of disabled people or have overcome personal disability.

== Work on practical theology ==
Hull read theology at Cambridge University from 1959 to 1962, and received a PhD in theology from the University of Birmingham in 1969, for a study of the background to the miracles of Jesus, in the magical world of the first century. This was the basis of his book of the same title, Hellenistic Magic and the Synoptic Tradition (1974).

Alongside his work on religious education, he was concerned with the theology of education, the theology of disability, and the theology of Christian mission, including a critique of money. Some of Hull's writings on the last subject have been edited and translated into German, and published as Gott und Geld ('God and Money') (2000). (Book not available in English.)

After becoming a professor emeritus at the University of Birmingham, his research and teaching interests turned to issues of practical theology. In 2004 he took up a post at the Queen's Foundation for Ecumenical Theological Education, Birmingham, as Honorary Professor in Practical Theology. There he was involved with the training of students for the Anglican and Methodist ministries, particularly in the area of prophetic ministry which concerns leadership on questions of social justice – questioning and criticising society in the name of the God of justice and peace.

He was the author of Mission-Shaped Church: A Theological Response (2006), a serious theological evaluation of the framework within which the Anglican policy document "Mission-Shaped Church" is presented, raising questions about the concepts of kingdom, church, gospel and mission.

== Death ==
Hull died on 28 July 2015 in hospital after a serious fall at his home in Birmingham four days earlier. He had celebrated his 80th birthday with friends and family three months before. Heralded as a brilliant thinker, he was survived by his wife and five children.

== See also ==
- Notes on Blindness – a documentary film on his diary of the experience
- List of Caulfield Grammar School people
