= Prevenge =

- Theatrical release poster
- Directed by: Alice Lowe
- Written by: Alice Lowe
- Produced by: Alice Lowe; Vaughn Sivell; Jennifer Handorf; Will Kane
- Starring: Alice Lowe; Kate Dickie; Kayvan Novak; Jo Hartley; Gemma Whelan; Tom Davis; Dan Renton Skinner; Mike Wozniak; Tom Meeten
- Cinematography: Ryan Eddleston
- Edited by: Matteo Bini
- Music by: Toydrum
- Production companies: Western Edge Pictures; Gennaker Group; Ffilm Cymru Wales
- Distributed by: Kaleidoscope Entertainment
- Release dates: 15 May 2016 (Cannes); 10 February 2017 (United Kingdom)
- Running time: 87 minutes
- Country: United Kingdom
- Language: English
- Budget: £80,000
- Box office: $103,885

Prevenge is a 2016 British comedy slasher film written by, directed by and starring Alice Lowe in her directorial debut. The film also stars Kate Dickie, Kayvan Novak, Jo Hartley, Mike Wozniak, Gemma Whelan and Tom Davis. The plot follows a pregnant widow who is convinced her foetus is compelling her to embark on a killing spree as revenge for the death of her husband.

Principal photography mainly took place in Cardiff in under two weeks, whilst Lowe was herself pregnant. The film was released in cinemas in February 2017. Before the film was released, Lowe gave birth to a baby girl, Della, who was able to portray Ruth’s newborn in the film, at ten days old.

== Plot ==
After her husband dies in a climbing accident when he was cut loose by the rest of his group, Ruth, now heavily pregnant, becomes convinced that her fetus is compelling her to murder and she tracks down the other people who were involved in the climbing accident for revenge. Her first victim is the owner of a reptile shop, whom she kills by slitting his throat. When her midwife tells her that the baby will let her know what’s good for her, Ruth reveals that she thinks that her baby is already telling her what to do.

Between several midwife appointments, Ruth kills people including her second victim who is a DJ whom she fakes drinking with at a bar and when they get back to his place, she slashes his femoral artery as well as cutting off one of his testicles. She then meets with a lawyer pretending to be applying for a job. After the lawyer tells her she needs to sort out her own life with the pregnancy, she walks over and kisses the lawyer then proceeds to slam her head onto the table before slitting her throat. While researching the climbing instructor Tom, she joins him at his rock-climbing gym. He tells her he can't teach her to climb as she is still pregnant, and he doesn't want to be held liable. On her way home, she collapses in a tunnel in severe pain.

Ruth then meets Josh, a man she pretends to be interested in renting a room in a flat from. His overwhelming kindness surprises her as she noticeably has doubts about killing him. She appears to get up, potentially to give up on her plot when his flatmate Zac comes home and appears to recognize her, she attacks him and drives a statue through his eye as he shouts, "It wasn't me!" before knocking over Josh and killing him too for being a witness. While she's attempting to kill Len, she's punched in the stomach when Len defends herself. This gives Ruth the opportunity to stab Len to death. Before the police arrive, Ruth is forced to climb out of the dog door to escape. Her midwife assures her that her baby is healthy.

On one of her last attempts, Ruth suffers a life-threatening emergency regarding her baby. Her baby thus is delivered quickly via emergency caesarean section. Several days after the surgery, Ruth is quite depressed but soon realises that her baby is just a normal baby girl, not a psychopathic baby. The midwife tried to reassure Ruth that everything is going to be okay and goes off to get the health assistant to help Ruth with her feelings. Ruth takes this time to kiss her baby goodbye and go off to the cliffs to kill one last time.

== Cast ==
- Alice Lowe as Ruth
- Jo Hartley as the Midwife
- Gemma Whelan as Len
- Kate Dickie as Ella
- Kayvan Novak as Tom
- Tom Davis as DJ Dan
- Dan Renton Skinner as Mr Zabek
- Mike Wozniak as Josh
- Tom Meeten as Zac
- Eileen Davies as Jill
- Della Moon Synnott as Baby

== Reception ==
Prevenge received positive reviews for its blend of black comedy and horror. It holds a rating of 91% on the review aggregator Rotten Tomatoes. The site's consensus reads, "As ambitious as it is daringly transgressive, Prevenge should thrill fans of pitch black horror comedy - and open untold opportunities for writer/director/star Alice Lowe." Metacritic, which uses a weighted average, assigned the film a score of 71 out of 100, based on 20 critics, indicating "generally favorable" reviews.

Peter Bradshaw of The Guardian gave the film four out of five, calling it "gruesomely successful". Mark Kermode, also for The Guardian, gave the film four out five and called it an "impressively peculiar film".

Jeanette Catsoulis of The New York Times calling the film "a brilliantly conceived meditation on prepartum anxiety and extreme grief". Guy Lodge of Variety called the film "a scrappy but excitingly singular directorial debut". David Ehrlich of IndieWire who gave the film a B− but felt the film could have used more time "in utero".

Less effusive was Simon Abrams of RogerEbert.com gave the film one and a half, saying that it is "a gonzo idea in search of better execution".

=== Accolades ===
Award	Date	Category	Recipient(s)	Result	Ref.
British Independent Film Awards	4 December 2016	The Douglas Hickox Award	Alice Lowe	Nominated	
Monster Fest	29 November 2016	Monster Innovation Award	Alice Lowe	Won	
