= Brand New-U =

2015 film by Simon Pummell

- Directed by: Simon Pummell
- Written by: Simon Pummell
- Produced by: Janine Marmot; Conor Barry; John Keville; Reinier Selen
- Starring: Lachlan Nieboer; Nora-Jane Noone
- Edited by: Tim Roza
- Music by: Roger Goula Sarda
- Production companies: Hot Property Films; Savage Productions; Rinkel Film; Finite Films; Illuminations Films
- Distributed by: The Match Factory
- Release date: 20 June 2015 (Edinburgh International Film Festival)
- Running time: 100 minutes
- Countries: United Kingdom; Ireland; Netherlands
- Language: English

Brand New-U (U.S. title: Identicals) is a 2015 science fiction, thriller film written and directed by Simon Pummell and produced by Janine Marmot. It stars Lachlan Nieboer and Nora-Jane Noone.

== Cast ==
- Lachlan Nieboer as Slater
- Nora-Jane Noone as Nadia
- Nick Blood as Johan
- Tony Way as Gun Dealer / Santa
- Robert Wilfort as Surgeon Two 'Peter'
- Jacinta Mulcahy as Abigail
- Tim Ahern as The Founder
- Anthony Cozens as Friend One
- Andrew Buckley as Friend Two
- Tim Faraday as Finder (voice)
- Sukie Smith as Waitress 'Sarah'
- Clare Monnelly as Worker
- Phelim Kelly as Shopper
- Martin Richardson as Santa 2 / Slater's Body Double
- Michelle Asante as Manager
- David Michael Scott as Brand New-U Raider Driver
- Jamael Westman as Brand New-U Hood Kemal

== Production ==
=== Pre-production ===
Brand New-U is bankrolled by the BFI Film Fund, Irish Film Board, Netherlands Film Fund and Finite Films. The film made the official selection for the Rotterdam Lab and is a multi platform, transmedia project featuring urban projection, geo- specific augmented reality, and online media.

=== Casting ===
In March 2013, Lachlan Nieboer and Nora-Jane Noone were cast as the two leads playing Slater and Nadia respectively.

=== Filming ===
Principal photography started on 1 April 2013 for four weeks in London, England and Dublin, Ireland.

== Marketing ==
Two pictures were released on 10 May 2013 via Total Film.
