= LX 2048 =

- Directed by: Guy Moshe
- Written by: Guy Moshe
- Produced by: Guy Moshe; Karolis Malinauskas; Linas Pozera; Matthew G. Zamias; Pedro Tarantino
- Starring: James D'Arcy; Anna Brewster; Delroy Lindo
- Cinematography: Thomas Buelens
- Edited by: Guy Moshe
- Music by: Sarah Decourcy; Ian Richter; Erez Moshe
- Production companies: Chimera Pictures; Lituanica Films
- Distributed by: Quiver Distribution
- Release date: September 25, 2020
- Running time: 103 minutes
- Countries: United States; Lithuania
- Language: English

LX 2048 is a 2020 science fiction thriller drama film written and directed by Guy Moshe and starring James D'Arcy, Anna Brewster and Delroy Lindo.

== Plot ==
In a dystopian future, the environment is so toxic that everyone is obliged to remain shielded from the sun and live in virtual reality for interaction. Father of three, Adam Bird, a worker in tech, struggles with his family relationships and what it means to be human in such a world. The government has instituted an insurance system for parents of three children or more where if one parent dies a clone takes their place. When Adam discovers that he has serious heart disease, he knows the news will be welcome to his ex-wife, but he must keep his company going so that their insurance policy remains valid and retain his grip on the real world.

== Cast ==
- Juliet Aubrey as Dr. Maple
- Anna Brewster as Reena Bird
- Gabrielle Cassi as Maria
- James D'Arcy as Adam Bird
- Delroy Lindo as Donald Stein
- Gina McKee as Dr. Rhys
- Jay Hayden as State Clerk
- Linc Hand as State Officer

== Release ==
The film was released on September 25, 2020.

== Reception ==
On the review aggregator website Rotten Tomatoes, 47% of 30 critics' reviews are positive, with an average rating of 5.3/10. The website's consensus reads: "LX 2048 tries grounding its sci-fi conceit in relatable family dynamics, but is ultimately too thinly sketched and narratively diffuse to work." Metacritic, which uses a weighted average, assigned the film a score of 61 out of 100, based on 4 critics, indicating "generally favorable" reviews. Rachael Harper of SciFiNow awarded the film four stars out of five. Leslie Felperin of The Guardian awarded the film three stars out of five. Grant Hermanns of Comingsoon.net rated the film a 5 out of 10. Brian Shaer of Film Threat scored the film an 8 out of 10.

Ed Fortune of Starburst gave the film a negative review and wrote, “It is partially saved by some amazing key moments and twist. Ultimately, though, it’s just too long and way too interested in its own cleverness.” G. Allen Johnson of the San Francisco Chronicle also gave the film a negative review and wrote, “I’m not sure how good a movie it is, but it would be an excellent basis for a streaming series, in which its ambitious ideas would have time to develop.”

John Defore of The Hollywood Reporter gave the film a positive review and wrote, “While LX 2048 isn’t equally satisfying on all fronts, it’s more than successful enough to add to the where-are-we-going? syllabus.” Cary Darling of the Houston Chronicle also gave the film a positive review and wrote, “It’s always fun when a little film comes out of nowhere that has the ability to surprise.”
