= Posy Miller =

British actress

Posy Miller was a British actress who died of leukemia in late 2002.

Her notable theatre appearances included The Revenger's Tragedy at The Bridewell in 2000 and work for the Reveal Theatre Company that included a leading role in Teechers by John Godber in 2002. She also originated the role of Cassie in the play Feint Traces of an Alien Being... in 1998.

Miller did voice work as well, including characters for the Microsoft Game Studios game Fusion Frenzy in 2001.

For Big Finish Productions range of audio dramas, based on the television science fiction series Doctor Who, she played the part of Sister Jolene in Excelis Dawns in 2002. She reprised the role in the Bernice Summerfield drama, The Plague Herds of Excelis later that same year.

In 2002, Posy recorded some video diary material for a speculative TV drama promo made by Molehill Productions. After her death, the production team used the tapes as a centrepiece for a new script, which began filming in 2004 and co-starred many of Posy's actor friends. The completed film is thought to be the first ever movie to be made starring a leading actor who was deceased before principal photography began. It premiered at the Raindance Film Festival in 2005 as Sam Jackson's Secret Video Diary, and was subsequently nominated for The Raindance Award at The British Independent Film Awards. The film was finally released on 28 December 2007, after being delayed for several years by music licensing problems.
