= Dream Alliance =

British-bred Thoroughbred racehorse (2001–2023)

- Sire: Bien Bien
- Grandsire: Manila
- Dam: Rewbell
- Damsire: Andy Rew
- Sex: Gelding
- Foaled: 23 March 2001
- Died: 21 April 2023 (aged 22)
- Country: Wales
- Colour: Chestnut
- Breeder: Rewbell Syndicate
- Owner: Alliance Partnership
- Trainer: Philip Hobbs
- Record: 30: 5–4–2
- Earnings: £138,646

Major wins
- Welsh National (2009)

Dream Alliance (23 March 2001 – 21 April 2023) was a British thoroughbred racehorse, owned by the Alliance Partnership and trained by Philip Hobbs.

== Background ==
Dream Alliance was bred by Janet Vokes, whose main experience until then had been with breeding whippets and racing pigeons. While working as a barmaid at a local pub, she overheard Howard Davies, a local tax adviser, discussing a racehorse he had once owned. She was inspired by the idea, and soon after she and her husband, Brian, found a mare named Rewbell who was available for £1000, due in part to a barbed wire injury and a very bad temperament. They ultimately bought her for £350 and named Davies as the "racing manager" of the group.

They bred Rewbell to Bien Bien, a stallion in his first year at stud in the UK, and the ensuing foal was born in 2001. The horse was reared on an allotment in Cefn Fforest near the town of Blackwood in south Wales, and ultimately 23 different people joined the ownership syndicate. Each member originally contributed £10 per week to help develop the young horse and keep him in race training. The syndicate was organized by Davies, who estimated that it would cost £15,000 a year to keep the horse in training and determined that 30 people, each contributing £10 a week, could work.

== Racing career ==
Dream Alliance moved from the Vokes' allotment to a stable when he was a yearling. At age three, he came to Philip Hobbs for training, after the syndicate had raised enough money to pay the training costs. On November 10, 2004, he came in fourth in his first race, third the next time, then second and finally in January 2006, won in his fourth race, over hurdles at Chepstow. He then entered a slump, but began winning again in April 2007 at the Perth Gold Cup. In a 2008 preparatory race for the Grand National at the Aintree Festival, he sliced a tendon on the course, and only the quick thinking of his jockey and the urging of Davies saved him from being euthanized. Treatment required a very new stem cell treatment, but ultimately he healed and was able to race again. His winnings were adequate to cover the costs of his surgery and 15 months of rehabilitation. He re-entered race training in July 2009.

The horse won the 2009 Welsh National by three-quarters of a length, ridden by Tom O'Brien. As a result of his humble background and the successful treatment, the horse received significant media coverage in the run-up to the 2010 Grand National. He failed to complete that race, being pulled up after the seventh fence. After the Grand National, he was found to have a lung condition. Though he ran in seven more races, he did not place again. He was retired in 2012.

Altogether, he ran 30 races and won £138,646 in prize money. After all training and veterinary expenses were paid, including his surgery costs, the 23 syndicate members each obtained a profit of £1430.

As of 2012, Dream Alliance was stabled in Somerset under the care of the groom who worked for Hobbs and took care of him during his career.

== Post-racing ==
In 2015, a documentary about the horse and the people around him, titled Dark Horse: The Incredible True Story of Dream Alliance, premiered at the Sundance Film Festival and won the World Cinema audience award.

Dream Horse, a fictionalized account of the Alliance Partnership and Dream Alliance starring Toni Collette and Damian Lewis, played the Sundance Film Festival in 2020 and went into general release in 2021.

Dream Alliance died on 21 April 2023, at the age of 22.
