= The Apple Tree (short story) =

1917 short story by John Galsworthy

"The Apple Tree" is a 1917 short story by John Galsworthy that has been adapted several times for other media.

== Adaptations ==
- Lady Esther Almanac radio show (CBS) - 12 January 1942 - with Orson Welles
- Mercury Summer Theatre radio show - 6 September 1946
- A Summer Story (1988) - film
