= Volume (film) =

- Screenshot
- Directed by: Mahalia Belo
- Written by: Anna Ingeborg Topsøe
- Story by: Mahalia Belo; Anna Ingeborg Topsøe
- Produced by: Casey Herbert
- Starring: Joe Cole; Anna Brewster
- Edited by: Arttu Salmi
- Music by: Jonathan Hill
- Release date: 2012
- Running time: 27 minutes
- Country: United Kingdom
- Language: English

Volume is a 2012 short film directed by Mahalia Belo, written by Anna Ingeborg Topsøe, and starring Joe Cole and Anna Brewster. It won the Best British Short film at the 2012 Moët British Independent Film Awards and the Grand Jury Prize for Best Film at San Francisco Shorts 2013. It was also part of the official selection at the 2013 Sundance Film Festival while also appearing at numerous other film festival. Volume was director Mahalia Belo's graduation short at the National Film and Television School (NTFS).

== Cast ==
- Joe Cole as Sam
- Anna Brewster as Georgina
- Jamie Sives as Nik
- Susan Vidler as Angie
- Hilary Tones as Julie
- David Acton as Richard
- Jake Davies as Johnny
- Melanie Jessop as Claire
