= British Independent Film Awards 2016 =

Annual British film awards ceremony

The 19th British Independent Film Awards nominations were announced on 1 November 2016.

== Awards ==
=== Best British Independent Film ===
- American Honey
- Couple in a Hole
- I, Daniel Blake
- Notes on Blindness
- Under the Shadow

=== Best Director ===
- Andrea Arnold - American Honey
- Babak Anvari - Under the Shadow
- Ben Wheatley - Free Fire
- Ken Loach - I, Daniel Blake
- Peter Middleton and James Spinney - Notes on Blindness

=== Best Actress ===
- Sasha Lane - American Honey
- Kate Dickie - Couple in a Hole
- Narges Rashidi - Under the Shadow
- Hayley Squires - I, Daniel Blake
- Jodie Whittaker - Adult Life Skills

=== Best Actor ===
- Dave Johns - I, Daniel Blake
- Steve Brandon - My Feral Heart
- Michael Fassbender - Trespass Against Us
- Shia LaBeouf - American Honey
- Max Records - I Am Not a Serial Killer

=== Best Supporting Actress ===
- Avin Manshadi - Under the Shadow
- Gemma Arterton - The Girl With All the Gifts
- Naomie Harris - Our Kind of Traitor
- Terry Pheto - A United Kingdom
- Shana Swash - My Feral Heart

=== Best Supporting Actor ===
- Brett Goldstein - Adult Life Skills
- Jamie Dornan - Anthropoid
- Sean Harris - Trespass Against Us
- Arinze Kene - The Pass
- Christopher Lloyd - I Am Not a Serial Killer

=== Most Promising Newcomer ===
- Hayley Squires - I, Daniel Blake
- Steve Brandon - My Feral Heart
- Dave Johns - I, Daniel Blake
- Sennia Nanua - The Girl with All the Gifts
- Letitia Wright - Urban Hymn

=== The Douglas Hickox Award ===
- Under the Shadow - Babak Anvari
- Adult Life Skills - Rachel Tunnard
- Notes on Blindness - Peter Middleton and James Spinney
- Prevenge - Alice Lowe
- Trespass Against Us - Adam Smith

=== Best Debut Screenwriter ===
- Adult Life Skills - Rachel Tunnard
- The Levelling - Hope Dickson Leach
- Mindhorn - Julian Barratt and Simon Farnaby
- The Passing - Ed Talfan
- A Patch of Fog - John Cairns and Michael Lennox

=== Breakthrough Producer ===
- The Girl with All the Gifts - Camille Gatin
- Adult Life Skills - Michael Berliner
- The Hard Stop - Dionne Walker
- Notes on Blindness - Mike Brett, Jo-Jo Ellison and Steve Jamison
- Where You’re Meant to Be - Paul Fegan

=== Best Screenplay ===
- Under the Shadow - Babak Anvari
- Adult Life Skills - Rachel Tunnard
- American Honey - Andrea Arnold
- I Am Not a Serial Killer - Christopher Hyde and Billy O'Brien
- I, Daniel Blake - Paul Laverty

=== Best Achievement in Craft ===
- Robbie Ryan - American Honey (cinematography)
- Shaheen Baig - Free Fire (casting)
- Seb Barker - The Girl with All the Gifts (visual effects)
- Joakim Sundström - Notes on Blindness (sound)
- Paul Monaghan and Mat Whitecross - Supersonic (editing)

=== Best Documentary ===
- Notes on Blindness - Mike Brett, Jo-Jo Ellison, Steve Jamison, Peter Middleton, James Spinney
- The Confession: Living the War on Terror - Ashish Ghadiali, James Rogan
- Dancer - Steven Cantor, Gabrielle Tana
- The Hard Stop - George Amponsah, Dionne Walker
- Versus: The Life and Films of Ken Loach - Rebecca O'Brien, Louise Osmond

=== Best Foreign Independent Film ===
- Moonlight - Dede Gardner, Barry Jenkins, Jeremy Kleiner, Tarell Alvin McCraney, Adele Romanski
- Hunt for the Wilderpeople - Carthew Neal, Matt Noonan, Leanne Saunders, Taika Waititi
- Manchester by the Sea - Lauren Beck, Matt Damon, Kenneth Lonergan, Chris Moore, Kimberly Steward, Kevin J. Wals
- Mustang - Deniz Gamze Ergüven, Charles Gillibert, Alice Winocour
- Toni Erdmann - Maren Ade, Jonas Dornbach, Janine Jackowski, Michael Merkt

=== Discovery Award ===
- The Greasy Strangler
- Black Mountain Poets
- The Darkest Universe
- The Ghoul
- Gozo
