= Adult Life Skills =

- British release poster
- Directed by: Rachel Tunnard
- Written by: Rachel Tunnard
- Produced by: Michael Berliner
- Starring: Jodie Whittaker; Ozzy Myers; Brett Goldstein; Alice Lowe; Lorraine Ashbourne; Eileen Davies; Edward Hogg; Rachael Deering
- Cinematography: Bet Rourich
- Music by: Micah P. Hinson
- Production company: Creative England
- Distributed by: Lorton Distribution
- Release dates: 17 April 2016 (Tribeca Film Festival); 24 June 2016
- Running time: 96 minutes
- Country: United Kingdom
- Language: English

Adult Life Skills (formerly known as 'How To Live Yours') is a 2016 British comedy film funded by Creative England, and the feature debut of writer-director Rachel Tunnard. The feature-length version of the BAFTA-nominated short Emotional Fusebox, it premiered at the London Film Festival in 2014. It tells the story of 29-year-old Anna (portrayed by Jodie Whittaker) who moves into her mum's shed and refuses to move out after the death of her twin brother.

It premiered at the 2016 Tribeca Film Festival in April 2016 and won one of the top awards, the Nora Ephron prize for best female director.

== Plot ==
Since her twin brother Billy died, Anna is stuck, approaching 30 whilst living like a hermit in her mum, Marion's, garden shed. She spends her days making videos, using her thumbs as actors, but shows them to no one. A week before her birthday, her mum gives her an ultimatum: she must move out of the shed, get a haircut, and stop dressing like a homeless teenager. When Anna's school friend comes to visit, her self-imposed isolation becomes impossible to maintain. Soon, she is entangled with Clint, a troubled eight year old whose mother is seriously ill, and the local estate agent, Brendan, whose awkward interpersonal skills continually undermine his attempts to seduce her.

== Locations ==
The film is set and shot predominantly in the Pennine hills of West Yorkshire, England. Jodie Whittaker is therefore able to use her native accent (she is from Skelmanthorpe) to portray her character, Anna. The yacht club at pennine beauty spot Scammonden Reservoir is a prominent outdoor location in the film.

== Cast ==
- Jodie Whittaker as Anna
- Ozzy Myers as Clint
- Edward Hogg as Billy
- Brett Goldstein as Brendan
- Alice Lowe as Alice
- Lorraine Ashbourne as Marion
- Eileen Davies as Jean
- Rachael Deering as Fiona
- Christian Contreras as Hank, Clint's father
