= Dark Horse: The Incredible True Story of Dream Alliance =

- Film poster
- Directed by: Louise Osmond
- Release dates: 23 January 2015 (Sundance Film Festival); 17 April 2015
- Country: United Kingdom
- Language: English

Dark Horse: The Incredible True Story of Dream Alliance is a 2015 documentary directed by Louise Osmond.

== Synopsis ==
In a small valley town in South Wales, a barmaid decides to breed a racehorse she ultimately names Dream Alliance. She and her husband buy a broodmare and she asks other villagers to join in the effort with funding and advice. The horse goes on to win the Welsh Grand National.

== Reception ==
On review aggregator website Rotten Tomatoes, the film holds an approval rating of 96%, based on 77 reviews, and an average rating of 7.5/10. The website's critical consensus reads, "Dark Horse offers a thoroughly crowd-pleasing look at an incredible – and inspirational – real-life story that will thrill equine enthusiasts and novices alike." On Metacritic, the film has a weighted average score of 75 out of 100, based on 29 critics, indicating "generally favorable reviews".

In The Observer, Jonathan Romney found the film to be "a good-humoured, no-frills story" adding that it has "the classic feelgood arc, but it’s also very political, revealing the snobbery directed not just at the owners but the horse itself".

It won the Audience Award in the World Cinema Documentary Competition at the 2015 Sundance Film Festival.

== See also ==
- List of films about horses
- Cinema of Wales
- List of Welsh films
