= Mahalia Belo =

English film and television director

- Born: United Kingdom
- Education: National Film and Television School
- Occupations: Film and television director
- Notable work: Volume, Ellen, Requiem, The Long Song, The End We Start From
- Awards: British Academy Television Craft Award – Best Breakthrough Talent (2017); BIFA – Best British Short Film (Volume)

Mahalia Belo is an English film and television director.

== Biography ==
Belo graduated from the National Film and Television School in 2012. Her graduation film, Volume, won a BIFA in the Best British Short Film category and was shown at the Sundance Film Festival and the BFI London Film Festival.

She won a 2017 British Academy Television Craft Award in the best breakthrough talent category for her work directing the television drama Ellen.

She directed psychological thriller Requiem and the TV adaption of Andrea Levy's novel about the last days of slavery in Jamaica, The Long Song, both of which were broadcast in 2018. Belo also directed The End We Start From, starring Jodie Comer and Benedict Cumberbatch.

== Favourite films ==
In 2022, Belo participated in the Sight & Sound film polls of that year. It is held every ten years to select the greatest films of all time, by asking contemporary directors to select ten films of their choice.

Belo selections were:

- Morvern Callar (2001)
- Days of Heaven (1978)
- The Headless Woman (2008)
- In the Mood for Love (2000)
- Beau travail (1999)
- The Master (2012)
- The Conversation (1974)
- Blue Velvet (1986)
- Citizen Kane (1941)
- Badlands (1973)
