= Janine Marmot =

British film producer

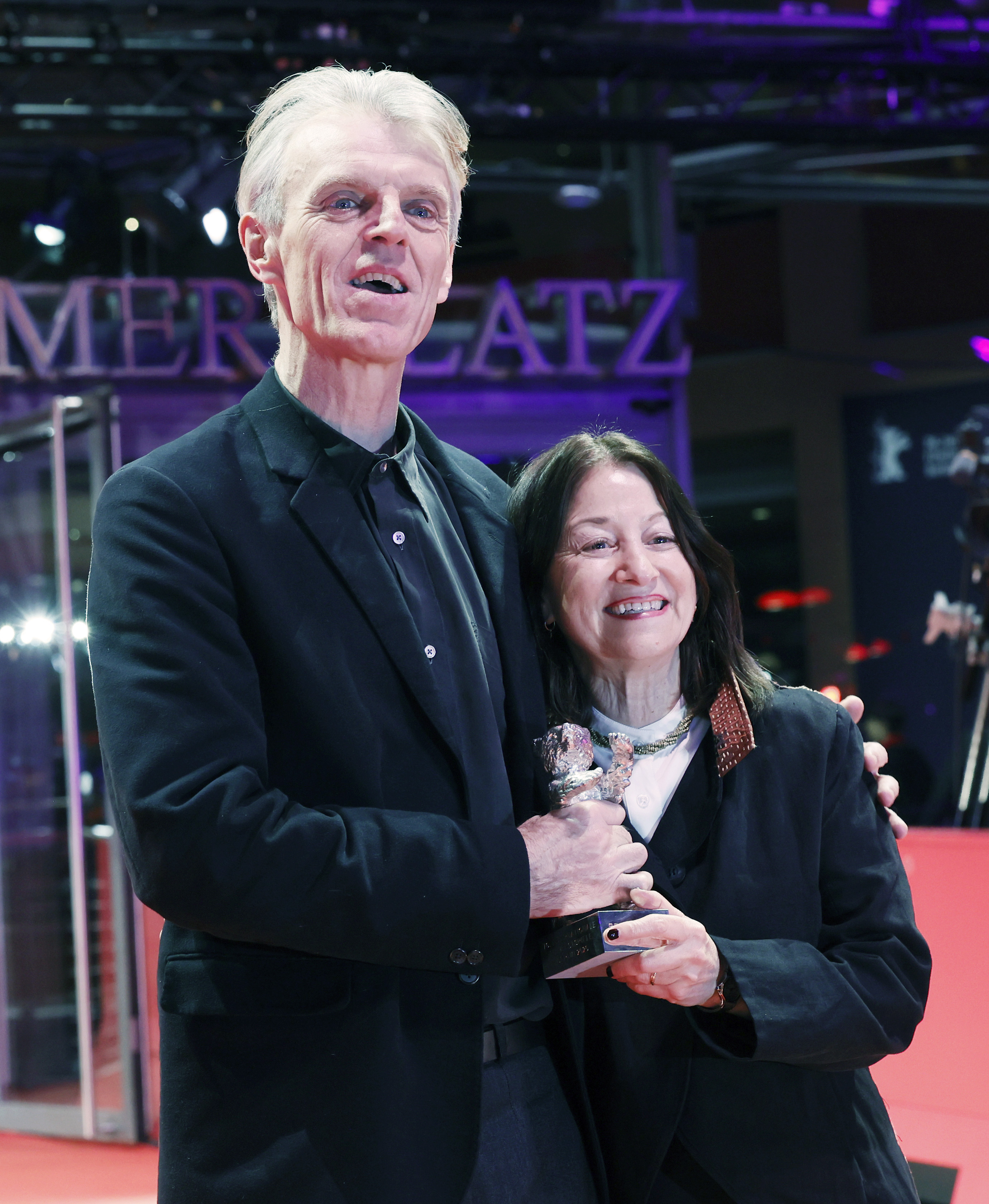
Janine Marmot (right) with Grant Gee at the Berlin Film Festival 2026

Janine Marmot is a British film producer and founder of Hot Property Films. She is best known for the BAFTA-winning documentary Bodysong and the relationship drama Kelly + Victor, which won the BAFTA award for Outstanding British Debut in 2014.

Her feature credits as producer include Simon Pummell's BAFTA and BIFA winning feature documentary Bodysong, scored by Jonny Greenwood of Radiohead and Shock Head Soul; Michael Whyte's No Greater Love and Looking For Light, Institute Benjamenta directed by the Brothers Quay; I Could Read The Sky directed by Nichola Bruce; and the multi-directed film Made In Heaven for the rock band Queen and the BFI. She has also produced documentaries and short drama working with directors including Tom Shankland, Jim Gillespie, Chantal Akerman and Christopher Petit.

She frequently co-produces with European partners, and produced Simon Pummell's new feature Brand New-U with finance from British Film Institute, Netherlands Film Fund, Irish Film Board and Finite Films.

Announced at International Film Festival Rotterdam in 2015 is an adaptation of Gibson's short story "Dogfight" by BAFTA award-winning writer and director Simon Pummell. Written by Gibson and Michael Swanwick and first published in Omni in July 1985, the film is being developed by British producer Janine Marmot at Hot Property Films.

Her development slate also includes an original screenplay by Ned Beauman, one of the writer's on Granta magazine's once in a decade list: Best of Young British Novelists, and an adaptation of the Margaret Atwood novel The Edible Woman.

== Teaching ==
For the last decade she has been an active teacher and mentor within the industry: in 2006 she ran a Channel Four Directors’ Workshop with Palme d’Or winning director Abbas Kiarostami; she was Director of Film at Skillset from 2007 until March 2009 and she is currently a visiting tutor for Masters students at the London Film School.

== Filmography ==
- Innocence of Memories (2015)
- Brand New-U (2015)
- Looking for Light: Jane Bown (2014)
- Kelly + Victor (2012)
- Relics and Roses (Documentary) (2011)
- Shock Head Soul (Documentary) (2011)
- No Greater Love (Documentary) (2009)
- Confession of a Vampire (Short) (2006)
- Monday Morning (Short) (2005)
- Trumpet (TV Short) (2005)
- Riko (Short) (2005)
- Bodysong (Documentary) (2003)
- I Could Read the Sky (1999)
- Wavelengths (Short) (1999)
- The Loved (Short) (1998)
- Ray Gun Fun (Short) (1998)
- Shankhill (1997)
- Queen: Made in Heaven (Feature) (1997)
- Evolution (Short) (1995)
- Heart-ache (Short) (1995)
- Institute Benjamenta, or This Dream That One Calls Human Life (1995)
- Lloyds Bank Channel 4 Film Challenge (TV Series) (producer - 1 episode) (1995)
- Rose Red (Short) (1994)
- The Temptation of Sainthood (Short) (1993)
- Ordinary People (1990)
- Dream from the Bath (1988)
- Family Business: Chantal Akerman Speaks About Film (TV Short) (1984)
