= Williams (film) =

2017 British documentary film by Morgan Matthews

- British release poster
- Directed by: Morgan Matthews
- Produced by: Hayley Reynolds; Sarah Hamilton
- Starring: Frank Williams
- Edited by: Johnny Burke
- Distributed by: Curzon Artificial Eye
- Release date: 4 August 2017
- Country: United Kingdom
- Language: English

Williams is a 2017 British feature documentary film that tells the story of the Williams Formula 1 team, from its inception. The film was produced by BBC Films, Minnow Films and Curzon Artificial Eye, and was distributed in cinemas across the UK and Ireland by Curzon Artificial Eye from 4 August 2017.

Directed by Morgan Matthews, the documentary focuses on the life, career and family of Sir Frank Williams, the founder of the Williams team. The film draws on Virginia William's autobiography, A Different Kind of Life, and makes extensive use of audiotapes recorded in the course of writing the book with a ghostwriter.
