= Bodysong =

2003 documentary film

- Directed by: Simon Pummell
- Written by: Simon Pummell
- Produced by: Janine Marmot
- Edited by: Daniel Goddard
- Music by: Jonny Greenwood
- Distributed by: FilmFour; UK Film Council
- Release date: 2003
- Running time: 78 Minutes
- Country: United Kingdom
- Language: None

Bodysong is a 2003 BAFTA-winning documentary about human life and the human condition directed by Simon Pummell and produced by Janine Marmot. The image search and research on the film was performed by Ann Hummel.

== Synopsis ==
The found footage film tells the story of an archetypal human life using stock footage and images, sourced from various countries and taken over the course of a century. Sources include microscopic medical footage, portraits, and newsreels. The images include the inside of the body, the first cry of a new-born baby, and archive footage of ritual celebration and the carnage of war. The story follows the human life cycle from birth to death. There is no spoken dialogue. All scenes are set to a score composed by Jonny Greenwood of Radiohead.

== Release ==
The film was released by Pathé in 2003. A limited collector's edition was released on DVD by the BFI in 2010, which included original essays by William Gibson, Geoff Andrew, Gareth Evans and Matt Hanson.

== Reception ==
Paul Thomas Anderson saw the film at its Rotterdam Festival premiere and said it was "like I was in a trance. A wonderful collection of the two simple things a film has to work with: pictures and music. It's a moving, scary and hypnotic potpourri of images and an experience that gets more lucid the more you watch." Anderson would go on to hire Greenwood as a composer for many of his films.

== Awards ==
The film won a BAFTA Interactive Award in 2004 and Best British Documentary at the British Independent Film Award in 2003.
