= Trollywood (film) =

2004 documentary film

- Directed by: Madeleine Farley
- Produced by: Philip Moross; Nick Nahum; Simon White
- Cinematography: Robert Bennett
- Edited by: Helen Lindley
- Music by: Jess Bailey
- Release date: 2004
- Running time: 82 minutes
- Countries: United Kingdom; United States
- Language: English

Trollywood is a 2004 documentary film about homelessness, directed by first-time British filmmaker Madeleine Farley, previously an artist and cartoonist. The film was nominated for Best Documentary at the British Independent Film Awards 2004 (but lost to Touching the Void) but won for Best Documentary at the Cinemanila International Film Festival.

== Content ==
Farley became interested in the causes and consequences of homelessness when she visited Los Angeles and Hollywood and observed the number of homeless people pushing their belongings in "trollies" (shopping carts, in American English). The documentary begins by focusing on how and why transients obtain their trollies and then examines some of the individual stories of homeless men and women.

The film also provides some background information, such as the increasing numbers of war veterans and those suffering from mental illness among the helpless, as well as examining Southern California's attempts to address the issue.

The film includes music donated royalty-free by Lou Reed, John Cale, and Nick Rhodes of Duran Duran (whom Farley was dating at the time).
