= Even When I Fall =

- DVD cover of Even When I Fall
- Directed by: Sky Neal; Kate McLarnon
- Produced by: Elhum Shakerifar
- Production companies: Postcode Films; Satya Films
- Release date: 11 June 2017 (UK)
- Running time: 93 Minute
- Countries: Nepal; United Kingdom
- Language: Nepali

Even When I Fall is a 2017 British-Nepalese documentary film directed by Sky Neal and Kate McLarnon. The film is produced by Elhum Shakerifar under the banner of Postcode Films, and Satya Films. The documentary follows Saraswoti, and Sheetal who are human trafficking survivors; once were slaves at circuses of India.

== Synopsis ==
Saraswoti and Sheetal met in Kathmandu. They are survivors of child trafficking in India's circuses. Both of them have been rescued and brought to Nepal; however, they return to a land they can barely remember. The documentary traces these two women over six years, as they reclaim their skills.

== Reception ==
=== Critical response ===
On review aggregator Rotten Tomatoes, the film holds an approval rating of 100% based on 9 reviews. The film received praise from audience and critics including The Guardian, The Irish Times, and Screen International.

=== Accolades ===
Year	Award	Category	Result	Refs.
2017	British Independent Film Awards	Discovery Award	Nominated	
2018	One World Media Awards	Best Feature Documentary	Nominated	
