= Children of the Snow Land =

- Directed by: Zara Balfour; Marcus Stephenson
- Starring: Nima Gurung; Sangpo Lama; Tsering Deki Lama; Jeewan Mahatara
- Edited by: Graham Taylor
- Music by: Chris Roe
- Release date: 2017 (KIMFF)
- Countries: Nepal; United Kingdom
- Languages: Nepali; English

Children of the Snow Land is a 2019 Nepalese English-language feature documentary film written and directed by Zara Balfour, and Marcus Stephenson. The film is produced by Zara Balfour and Marcus Stephenson, and Executive Produced by Christopher Hird. The documentary stars Nima Gurung, Sangpo Lama, Tsering Deki Lama, and Jeewan Mahatara in the lead roles. The documentary is about education in Nepal. The film premiered at the Kathmandu International Mountain Film Festival (KIMFF). It was released in UK cinemas with over 60 screenings nationwide, was shown on TV channels worldwide including Arte, BBC, Nippon and more. It won the BIFA Raindance Discovery Award, and 25 awards at film festivals worldwide, including Best Documentary at the Victoria Film Festival and London Independent Film Festival. It is available to stream on Curzon Home Cinema.

The film was produced by Picture on the Wall Productions and Mayfly TV, it was distributed by Dartmouth Films and the sales agent was Taskovski Films.

This film was the catalyst for director Zara Balfour to start an NGO, Snowland Journeys, to support the Nepalese children and communities featured in the film, with Dame Joanna Lumley as patron.

== Synopsis ==
In remote parts of Nepal, parents are sending their children to a school run by Buddhist monks in Kathmandu, the capital of the country, in hopes of giving them a better life. For about ten years or more, the children do not see their parents nor speak to them. Three students including Nima, Sangpo, and Tsering trek back to the Himalayas, where their parents are waiting for them to be raised in the world of technology. Whilst trekking, they film themselves and speak to the camera about their thoughts and feelings. Nima describes how his father dropped him at the school without even saying goodbye, which made his heart break.

== Cast ==
Credits adapted from I Will Tell.

- Nima Gurung
- Sangpo Lama
- Tsering Deki Lama
- Jeewan Mahatara

== Reception ==
=== Critical response ===
The film received praise from critics and audiences. Cath Clarke of The Guardian wrote, "You can count the miles. But with enormous sensitivity the film observes the distance these bright, confident city kids have travelled from poverty," giving it a rating of three out of five. Nigel Andrews of Financial Times wrote, "It’s a wonderfully touching documentary", "And almost a proof that everyone has a story — even a film — inside his or her life." Brady Clark of The Upcoming wrote, "...the tragedy of the documentary is equalled with the warmth of family and the optimism of its subjects." and gave the film three stars out of five.

=== Accolades ===
Year	Award	Category	Result	Ref(s)
2018	Autrans Mountain Film Festival	Prix Ina Best First Film	Won	
2018	Valletta Film Festival	Teen Choice Award	Won	
2018	Valletta Film Festival	Audience Award	Won	
2018	Nepal Human Rights International Film Festival	Best International Non-fiction	Won	
2018	Swiss Mountain Film Festival	Best Film	Won	
2018	DOC LA	Best International Documentary	Won	
2018	London Independent Film Festival	Best Documentary Feature	Won	
2019	Victoria Film Festival	Best Documentary	Won	
2019	Victoria Film Festival	Cineplex Audience Award	Won	
