= DC Shorts Film Festival =

Film festival in Washington, D.C., U.S.

- Location: Washington, D.C. United States
- Language: International
- Website: www.dcshorts.org

The DC Shorts Film Festival is an annual film festival held in Washington, D.C.

Started in 2003 by Jon Gann and Gene Cowan, the festival was designed to showcase the best short films from around the globe, strengthen Washington, DC's filmmaking community, and honor all visual storytellers. The first event was three days and showcased 33 films. It has since grown to over 10 days and more than 120 films every festival.

== History ==
DC Shorts provides opportunities for filmmakers of every skill level to explore and learn the craft of filmmaking while entertaining and expanding the horizons of audience members. This is done through a series of regularly scheduled educational programs, screening opportunities, sharing resources via online tools, partnering with film, arts and business organizations, as well as the annual DC Shorts International Film Festival and Screenplay Competition. Founded in 2003, the DC Shorts International Film Festival was created by DC-based filmmaker, Jon Gann, in response to the dozens of festivals where the focus wasn’t on the filmmakers and their craft. Jon decided to start his own event, focusing on the form he loves – short films. In 2006, the DC Film Alliance, a nonprofit arts organization, was created to present the DC Shorts Film Festival, and offer other programs and resources for Washington, D.C.–based filmmakers. The Alliance helped to bridge the gap between other area film organizations, foster a community for regional film festival directors, and sponsored monthly salons to educate filmmakers of all levels. In response to the needs of the industry, DC Shorts has recently rebranded many DC Film Alliance activities, re-tooled others, and now hosts year-round programming.

== Programming ==
DC Shorts Wins: special showcases of award-winning films from previous DC Shorts. Each year, some of the films have received Academy Award nominations. All of the films have won accolades worldwide.

DC Shorts Laughs: 90 minute shows that combine film and live performances from stand-up comedians. Runs during the evening.

Mentors: DC Shorts Mentors offers workshops where independent filmmakers can develop their skills through sessions led by film professionals and peers. These interactive workshops build on one another and are intended to support participants in improving their filmmaking abilities.

DC Shorts International Film Festival: The festival presents a large collection of short films in the United States. Its 10‑day program has included educational workshops, family events at DC public libraries, themed showcases (such as LGBTQ, documentary, animation, comedy, and horror), a screenplay competition with live table readings and a cash award, and various receptions for participants.

Online Film Library: DC Shorts provides access to over 375 films from past years. The films can be viewed in full‑screen, and many are available in HD.

== 2019 Event Schedule ==
DC Shorts Film Festival 2019 Screenings: Friday, September 20 through Saturday, September 28, 2019.

City View Party: Saturday, September 23 – This kick-off party is open to the public who can meet and mingle with the filmmakers to celebrate the beginning of the 16th annual festival. It will take place at the Cambria Hotel Rooftop.

Screenplay Auditions: Friday, September 27 – Auditions to participate in a screenplay table reading of screenplay finalists at the Landmark E Street Theater.

Screenplay Competition: Friday, September 27 – The Screenplay Competition showcasing six finalists to determine the winning screenplay at the Miracle Theater.
