= Sam Jackson's Secret Video Diary =

- Directed by: Guy Rowland
- Written by: Guy Rowland
- Starring: Posy Miller; Mia Fothergill; Jonathan Clarkson; Janet Greaves
- Distributed by: Molehill Productions
- Release date: 28 December 2007
- Running time: 75 minutes
- Country: United Kingdom
- Language: English

Sam Jackson's Secret Video Diary is a British independent film. The makers believe it is notable for being the first film ever made whose leading actor has died before the start of principal photography. The film's eponymous lead was played by Posy Miller, who died of acute leukemia on 24 December 2002.

The film takes the form of a TV documentary, and tells the story of a missing person, Samantha Jackson. One of Sam's friends discovers fragments of a video diary she had been making as a secret reality TV project, and comes into contact with the producer who has also lost touch with Sam. As the months go by, more tapes come to light, providing clues as to what really happened to Sam Jackson.

The film premiered at London's Raindance Film Festival in 2005, and was subsequently nominated for a British Independent Film Award. Wide release was then delayed following problems using commercial music in the film, finally resolved in 2007. The film was initially released on 28 December 2007 as a "pay-what-you-like" internet download through the production company's website, with 20% of profits going to the UK charities Leukaemia Research and Missing People. It was released simultaneously with a feature-length documentary, Beyond Fiction, which chronicles the true story behind the production.

In 2011 the film was made available as free to view, via the Sam Jackson's Secret Video Diary website.

== Plot ==
Samantha Jackson, a television videotape editor, was last seen in August 2003 and is officially classified as a missing person. Whilst sifting through Sam's flat several weeks after her disappearance, one of her friends, Abi Wright, discovers part of a video diary that Sam was making only a few weeks before her disappearance. The diary was a record of Sam's experiences phone dating, and was designed to be shown as Reality TV. Soon afterwards, the TV producer working with Sam, Kerry Finch, returns from a foreign assignment and tries to contact her - finding Abi instead. Kerry Finch has more tapes, which end dramatically after an apparent sudden downturn in Sam Jackson's fortunes.

The search, conducted with the police and the National Missing Persons Helpline and followed by the documentary crew, finds more clues which hint at a darker side to Sam's character. However, just when the trail seems to be going cold, a dramatic breakthrough occurs.

== Production ==
As a centrepiece, the film uses tapes Posy Miller made with Molehill Productions for television promotional tape earlier in 2002. The television production was intended to be a one-woman microdrama shown for only a few minutes each day and presented as real to the public. The project was kept secret to preserve the possibility of anonymity. The tape was made up of brief fragments of the entire story and intended to be seen by industry professionals only.

In December 2002, the project's sole actor, Posy Miller, became suddenly very ill and died a week later from acute leukemia. The makers attended her funeral, where they met Posy's friends and family for the first time and explained what she had spent part of her final year doing. Initially there was no question about continuing with the project, since they did not have enough material to complete their story. But a few weeks later, the project's director, Guy Rowland, had an idea of turning it around into a film which followed the search for a missing person.

After the blessing of Posy's family, the film's script was written around the fragments, and the cast was largely actor friends of Posy. Filming and editing ran through 2004 and 2005. Production funding was provided from the makers and friends.

== Release ==
The film premiered at the 13th Raindance Film Festival in 2005, and subsequently picked up a nomination for a British Independent Film Award (The Raindance Award). The makers then faced a problem - some commercial tracks were embedded into the original footage of Posy, and could not be replaced. Although Molehill had clearance for film festival use, use for a wider release proved much more difficult on the film's tiny budget. After 18 months of negotiations, the film was finally cleared, and a release date was set for 28 December 2007 (the week of the 5th anniversary of Posy Miller's death).

This global release followed the pattern of Radiohead's pioneering distribution for their 2007 Album In Rainbows (one of the band's songs is used in the film). The film was available in the DIVX video format, and it was up to the individual to decide how much to pay. The film's makers stated that in memory of Posy Miller, 10% of all income they received from the download sales will go to Leukaemia Research, a UK charity. A further 10% will go to Missing People. The latter charity (also British) was formerly known as the National Missing Persons Helpline, and helped in the film's production. Their spokeswoman at the time, Sophie Woodforde, is interviewed as herself in the film.

=== Free to view ===
In September 2011, the film's rights changed hands from Molehill Productions to the director. At the same time, the film was made available as straightforward free to view, via the Vimeo platform. Links to the Missing People and Leukaemia & Lymphoma Research charities have been maintained via the film's website.

=== Beyond Fiction: Posy Miller and the Story of Sam Jackson's Secret Video Diary ===
A second film, Beyond Fiction: Posy Miller and the Story of Sam Jackson's Secret Video Diary, was released in 2007, a genuine documentary which chronicles the turbulent production. The makers filmed behind-the-scenes footage of production tests, the casting process and filming with Posy Miller, which all feature in the film. Also appearing is Misha Herwin, Posy's mother, who talks with director Guy Rowland about the effect of the film on her.

The film runs for 84 minutes, and is narrated by Guy Rowland.
