= Graham Bendel =

British writer and filmmaker

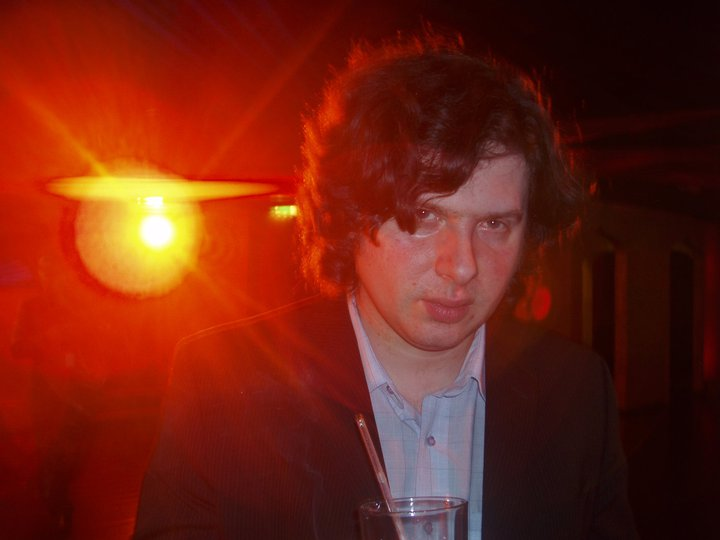
- Born: 30 December 1969 (age 56) Middlesex, England
- Occupation: Author; journalist; filmmaker
- Genre: Literary fiction

Graham Bendel is a British writer and filmmaker. He has written for The Big Issue, New Statesman, Hotdog and Prospect.

== Films ==
In 2005, he directed the documentary Billy Childish Is Dead, which was nominated for a British Independent Film Award and has been shown in Oslo, Montreal, Croatia, London and New York. Bendel has been described by Dazed and Confused as both "multi-talented" & a "creative crackerjack" and in 2019 completed a well-received documentary on Martin Newell & The Cleaners from Venus, which has so far played to several packed audiences in London, New York & Colchester. Bendel describes this film as the Third in his Lo-Fi trilogy of "rugged individuals".

Previous to this, Bendel made an independent documentary about Vic Godard and Subway Sect called Derailed Sense (featuring appearances from Luke Haines and Irvine Welsh). It was shown at the BFI, Hackney Picturehouse and venues in Scotland.

== Literature ==
His debut novel is called A Nasty Piece Of Work, published by Fortune Teller Press. A Nasty Piece Of Work - "a quirky and highly original psychological thriller" - was published in a small initial quantity, featuring the artwork of writer Clive Barker.

His second novel, published by Fortune Teller Press in 2015, is called Dress Rehearsal Brags: An A-Z of Unpopular Culture. It is an encyclopedic examination of an everyman's life, traversing the 80s and 90s and including many instances of 'alternative culture'. The book has been reviewed by Louder Than War and Huck Magazine.

Bendel's third novel, published in 2021, is called The Comforter & other Rose-Tinted Struggles. This is also published by Fortune Teller Press.

== Poetry & other writing ==
Bendel is the editor of two volumes of Poems For The Retired Nihilist, published by Fortune Teller Press. It was featured on "the must list" of The Guardian on 2 September 2005.

== Awards ==
Bendel's first film, Billy Childish is Dead, was nominated for a British Independent Film Award in 2005.
