= British Independent Film Awards 2006 =

9th British Independent Film Awards

The 9th British Independent Film Awards, held in November 2006 at the Hammersmith Palais, London, honoured the best British independent films of 2006.

== Awards ==
=== Best British Independent Film ===
- This Is England
- The Last King of Scotland
- The Queen
- Red Road
- The Wind That Shakes the Barley

=== Best Director ===
- Kevin Macdonald – The Last King of Scotland
- Stephen Frears – The Queen
- Michael Caton-Jones – Shooting Dogs
- Shane Meadows – This Is England
- Ken Loach – The Wind That Shakes the Barley

=== The Douglas Hickox Award ===
Given to a British director on their debut feature

- Menhaj Huda – KiDULTHOOD
- Caradog W. James – Little White Lies
- Paul Andrew Williams – London to Brighton
- Andrea Arnold – Red Road
- Tom Vaughan – Starter for 10

=== Best Actor ===
- Tony Curran – Red Road
- James McAvoy – The Last King of Scotland
- Forest Whitaker – The Last King of Scotland
- Peter O'Toole – Venus
- Cillian Murphy – The Wind That Shakes the Barley

=== Best Actress ===
- Kate Dickie – Red Road
- Juliette Binoche – Breaking and Entering
- Robin Wright – Breaking and Entering
- Frances de la Tour – The History Boys
- Helen Mirren – The Queen

=== Best Supporting Actor/Actress ===
- Leslie Phillips – Venus
- Martin Compston – Red Road
- Joseph Gilgun – This Is England
- Stephen Graham – This Is England
- Vanessa Redgrave – Venus

=== Best Screenplay ===
- Peter Morgan – The Queen
- Alan Bennett – The History Boys
- Peter Morgan and Jeremy Brock – The Last King of Scotland
- Shane Meadows – This Is England
- Hanif Kureishi – Venus

=== Most Promising Newcomer ===
- Thomas Turgoose – This Is England
- Rafi Gavron – Breaking and Entering
- Harry Treadaway and Luke Treadaway – Brothers of the Head
- Samuel Barnett – The History Boys
- Dominic Cooper – The History Boys
- Jodie Whittaker – Venus

=== Best Achievement in Production ===
- London to Brighton
- KiDULTHOOD
- The Road to Guantanamo
- Severance
- Shooting Dogs

=== Best Technical Achievement ===
- Anthony Dod Mantle – The Last King of Scotland (for cinematography)
- Alan MacDonald – The Queen (for production design)
- Daniel Phillips – The Queen (for makeup)
- Ludovico Einaudi – This Is England (for original music)
- Barry Ackroyd – The Wind That Shakes the Barley (for cinematography)

=== Best British Documentary ===
- The Road to Guantanamo
- Blindsight
- The Great Happiness Space: Tale of an Osaka Love Thief
- The Pervert's Guide to Cinema
- Unknown White Male

=== Best British Short ===
- Cubs
- The 10th Man
- At the End of the Sentence
- Ex Memoria
- Who I Am and What I Want

=== Best 15 Second Short ===
- What's the Point?
- Ah, Youth
- Chrysanthemums the Word
- Death of the Dinosaurs
- Fate and Mr. McKinley

=== Best Foreign Film ===
- Caché – (France)
- Brick – (USA)
- The Beat That My Heart Skipped – (France)
- Hard Candy – (USA)
- Volver – (Spain)

=== The Raindance Award ===
- Ballad of AJ Weberman
- London to Brighton
- Scenes of a Sexual Nature

=== The Richard Harris Award ===
- Jim Broadbent

=== Special Jury Prize ===
- Ken Loach

=== Entertainment Personality Award ===
- Helen Mirren
