= Louise Osmond =

British documentary filmmaker

Louise Osmond is a British documentary filmmaker.

Osmond graduated from the University of Oxford with a degree in modern history. Before she became a filmmaker, Osmond worked as a journalist and editor in Brussels, Paris, Rome and Africa. During this time, she was working in the news journalism graduate trainee for the UK network ITN.

Some of Osmond's film titles include: Blitz: London`s Firestorm (2005), Deep Water (2006), The Beckoning Silence (2007), McQueen and I (2011), Richard III: The King in the Car Park (2013), and Dark Horse (2015). Osmond most well known recent films include Dark Horse and Versus: The Life and Films of Ken Loach (2016).

In 2008 Osmond won the International Emmy Award for Documentary for The Beckoning Silence. Osmond's Richard III: The King in the Car Park was nominated for the British Academy Television Award for Best Specialist Factual in 2014. Dark Horse won the 2015 International Documentary Audience Award at Sundance and the 2015 BIFA for Best Documentary.
