= Billy Childish Is Dead =

- Directed by: Graham Bendel
- Release date: 2005

Billy Childish Is Dead is a 2005 rock n’ roll-themed documentary on the life of Billy Childish. It is directed by Graham Bendel. It features live footage of his bands Thee Headcoats, Thee Milkshakes, and others.

== Awards ==
It was nominated for the 2005 The Raindance Award of the British Independent Film Awards.

== Reception ==
- Variety calls it a cult feature.
- Music News calls it a "great rock'n'roll movie".
