= Notes on Blindness =

- British release poster
- Directed by: Pete Middleton; James Spinney
- Produced by: Mike Brett; Jo Jo Ellison; Steve Jamison; Pete Middleton; James Spinney; Alex Usborne
- Cinematography: Gerry Floyd
- Edited by: Julian Quantrill
- Music by: James Ewers; Noah Wood
- Production companies: Archer's Mark; Creative England; Impact Partners; Arte Cinema; BBC Storyville; Curzon Artificial Eye; British Film Institute
- Distributed by: Artificial Eye
- Release dates: 24 January 2016 (Sundance); 1 July 2016 (UK)
- Running time: 90 minutes
- Country: United Kingdom
- Language: English

Notes on Blindness is a 2016 British documentary film directed by Peter Middleton and James Spinney. The film profiles writer and theologian John M. Hull, who became totally blind, just days before the birth of his first son, after decades of steadily deteriorating vision. To help him make sense of the upheaval in his life, Hull began documenting his experiences on audio cassette and wrote his autobiography Touching the Rock: An Experience of Blindness in 1990. He discusses difficulties such as remembering his families faces, and being unable to find audio versions of the academic books he wants to read, and thus having to ask friends and family to record them for him. The film is based upon this work, and his taped diaries and letters. The directors previously created a 2014 Emmy winning short film on the same subject, which this film builds upon.

The film won the British Independent Film Award for Best Documentary and received nominations for Best Director, Breakthrough Producer, Best Achievement in Craft (Joakim Sundström for sound) and the Douglas Hickox Award. At the 70th British Academy Film Awards, the film was nominated for Best British Film, Best Documentary and Outstanding Debut by a British Writer, Director or Producer. It was pitched at Sheffield Doc/Fest's 2012 MeetMarket.

Dan Renton Skinner and Simone Kirby depict John Hull and Marilyn Hull respectively in the film.

"Notes on Blindness: Into Darkness", an immersive VR experience, released alongside the film, won a XR Peabody Award in 2021.
