= The Great Happiness Space =

The Great Happiness Space: Tale of an Osaka Love Thief
- Directed by: Jake Clennell
- Produced by: Jake Clennell
- Cinematography: Jake Clennell
- Release date: 2006
- Running time: 76 minutes
- Country: United Kingdom
- Language: Japanese

The Great Happiness Space: Tale of an Osaka Love Thief is a 2006 documentary film by Jake Clennell, describing a host club in Osaka. The male hosts and their female customers are interviewed, and through the interviews, we learn about the nature of host clubs and why the customers are coming there.

== Awards ==
Award	Category	Result	Ref.
Edinburgh International Film Festival	Best Documentary Feature	Won	
Gotham Award	Best Film Not Playing at a Theatre Near You	Nominated	
British Independent Film Awards	Best British Documentary	Nominated	
IDA Award	Best Documentary Feature	Nominated	
Raindance Film Festival	Best Documentary	Nominated	
