= School of Life (2003 film) =

School of Life is a 7–minute British short film, directed by Jake Polonsky and released in 2003.

== Plot summary ==
Two kids debate about if they should go to school or not. One of the kids, Stanley, decides to go to school because they might learn something, which makes the other kid shrug and walk away. His teacher, Miss Given, hands out the answers to everything and the only problem is that he has to share his copy with a school bully named Garth.

== Reception ==
An Iofilm review says, "This is neatly shot and well acted, but it isn't particularly memorable. Also, what is with these character names? When was the last time you met a school kid named Stanley? And, more importantly, why give the teacher a name that seems to have escaped from Pilgrim's Progress? Grumbles aside, you should watch it. You might just learn something." It won the BIFA for Best British Short Film in 2004.
