= Simon Pummell =

British filmmaker

Simon Pummell is a British filmmaker currently based in Amsterdam in The Netherlands, best known for directing Bodysong (2003) a documentary feature film that portrays the human life-cycle through archive footage from across a century of moving image creation.

He studied Film & Television in the animation department at the Royal College of Art.

== Career ==
Early in his career Pummell made animated films for UK television produced by Keith Griffiths, producer of the animators the Brothers Quay. One of these films Secret Joy of Falling Angels won the Grand Prix at the Oberhausen Film Festival in 1992. In this period Pummell also made two films for the rock band Queen - a special video album for the release of Made In Heaven. The clip Heaven For Everyone was an early documentary portrait of the cyborg body-artist Stelarc. The Queen video album Made In Heaven was produced by Janine Marmot for the British Film Institute. Pummell and Marmot subsequently formed a company together Hot Property Films.

Bodysong (2003) is a transmedia project that included a research project to trace as much individual information and as many narratives as possible about every individual event and person portrayed in the many hundreds of archival footage clips used. In 2004 the project won an interactive BAFTA and a BIFA for best feature documentary. The Ivor Novello Award nominated soundtrack is notable as being the first film soundtrack written by Jonny Greenwood of Radiohead. Paul Thomas Anderson championed the film, and went on to work with Greenwood on the Oscar-winning feature There Will Be Blood. William Gibson has written an essay on the film for the British Film Institute 2010 DVD re-issue of the film.

Having taught for several years at Harvard University VES as a Visiting Professor, Pummell was a Harvard Film Study Center Fellow in 2008-2009.

His second feature film Shock Head Soul (2011) was a feature-length documentary biopic depicting the insanity and Outsider Art autobiography of Daniel Paul Schreber. It premiered in Venice International Film Festival 2011. An associated gallery exhibition has been shown with the film in Rotterdam International Film Festival and Melbourne International Film Festival, as well as M HKA museum of Modern Art Belgium.

He is a course director of the Master of Arts in Fine Art and Design: Lens-Based Media programme at the Piet Zwart Institute, Willem de Kooning Academy, Rotterdam.

== Filmography ==
=== Features ===
- Brand New-U (2015)
- Shock Head Soul (Documentary) (2011)
- Bodysong (Documentary) (2003)

=== Shorts ===
- Stop for a Minute (2001)
- How Long is a Minute? (2001)
- Blinded by Light (2000)
- Ray Gun Fun (1998)
- Queen: Made in Heaven (1997)
- Butcher's Hook (1995)
- Evolution (1995)
- Heart-ache (1995)
- Rose Red (1994)
- The Temptation of Sainthood (1993)
- Secret Joy of Falling Angels (1991)
