= London Film Critics Circle Awards 2021 =

Edition of British film award

42nd London Film Critics' Circle Awards

6 February 2022

Film of the Year:
The Power of the Dog

British/Irish Film of the Year:
The Souvenir Part II

The 42nd London Film Critics' Circle Awards honoured the best in film of 2021, as chosen by the London Film Critics' Circle. All films released in a UK cinema and direct to premiere streaming services between February 2021 and February 2022 were all eligible to be nominated. For the second year in a row, the event took place virtually on the London Critics' Circle YouTube channel, this time with critics presenting awards remotely from the ceremony's usual home at The May Fair Hotel.

The nominations were announced on 16 December 2021 by actors Gwilym Lee and Joanna Vanderham.

The London Critics' Circle Film Awards is sponsored by The Critics' Circle, The May Fair Hotel, Rémy Martin, DDA, and Pearl Pictures Productions. An in-person event to celebrate the winners took place later in 2022.

== Winners and nominees ==
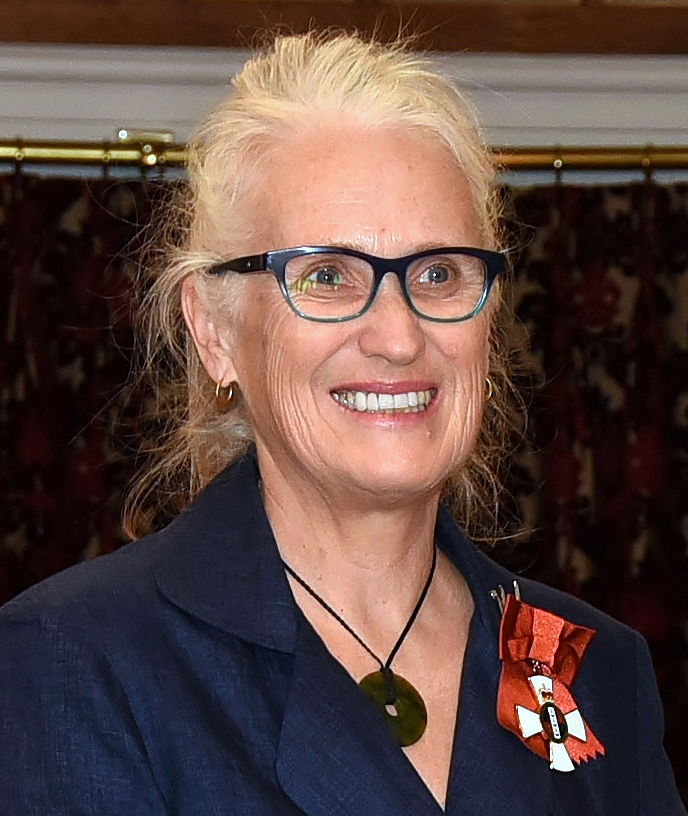
Jane Campion, Director of the Year winner

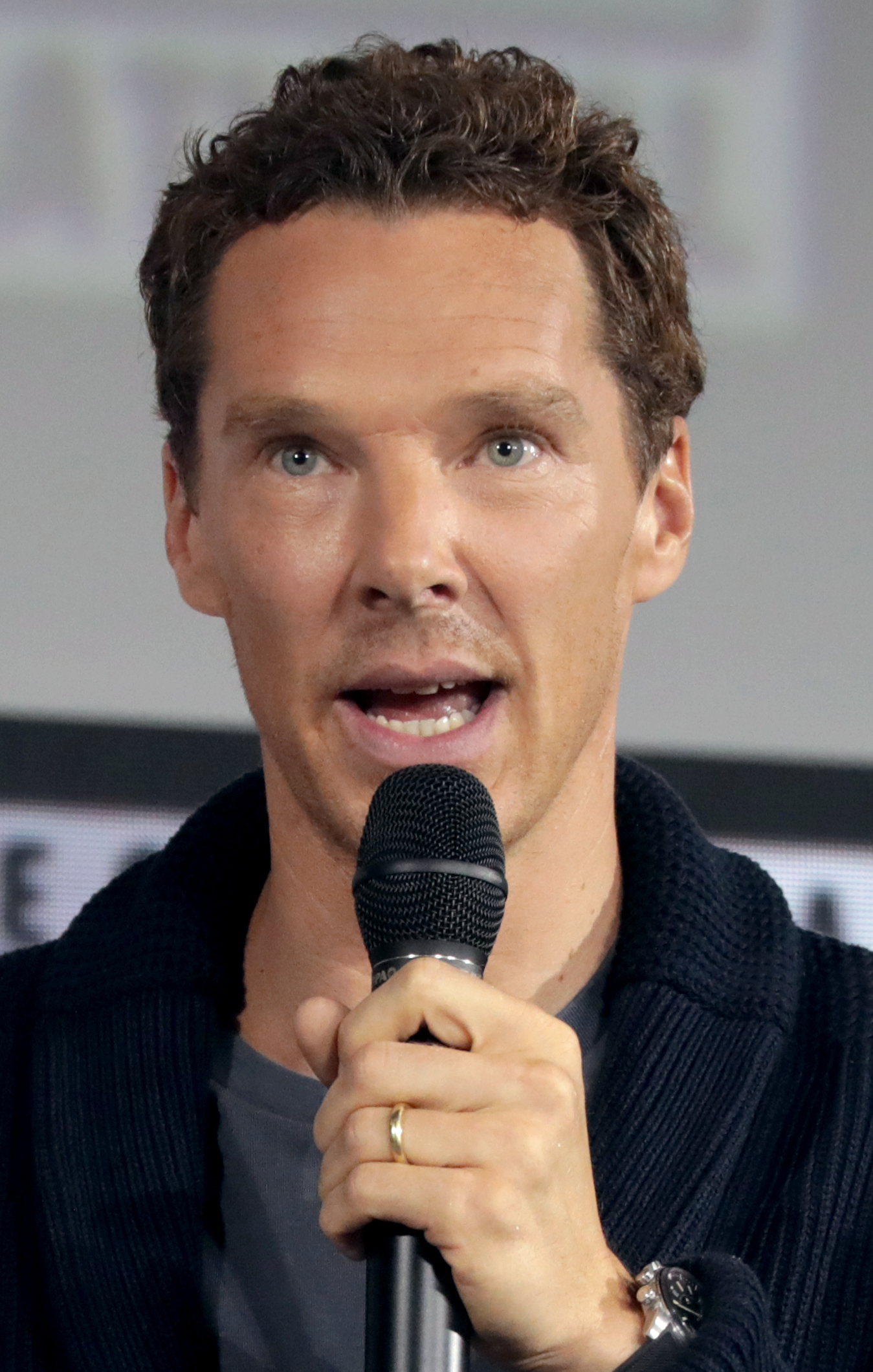
Benedict Cumberbatch, Actor of the Year winner

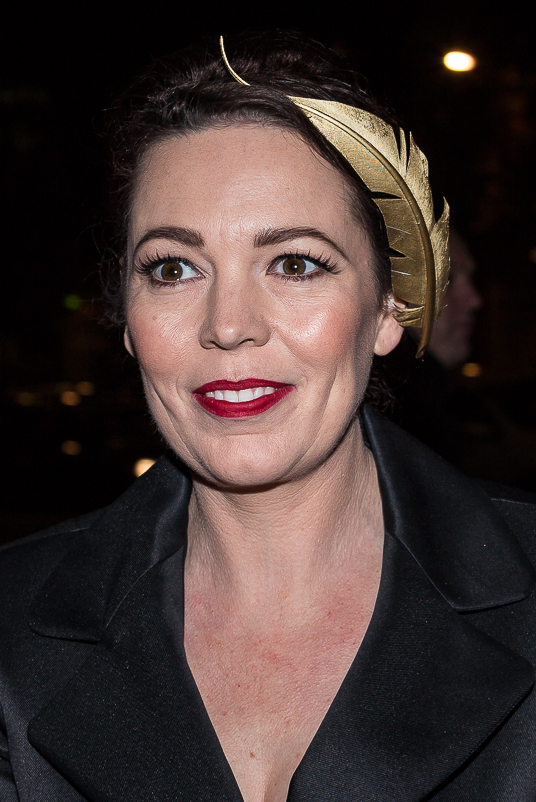
Olivia Colman, Actress of the Year winner

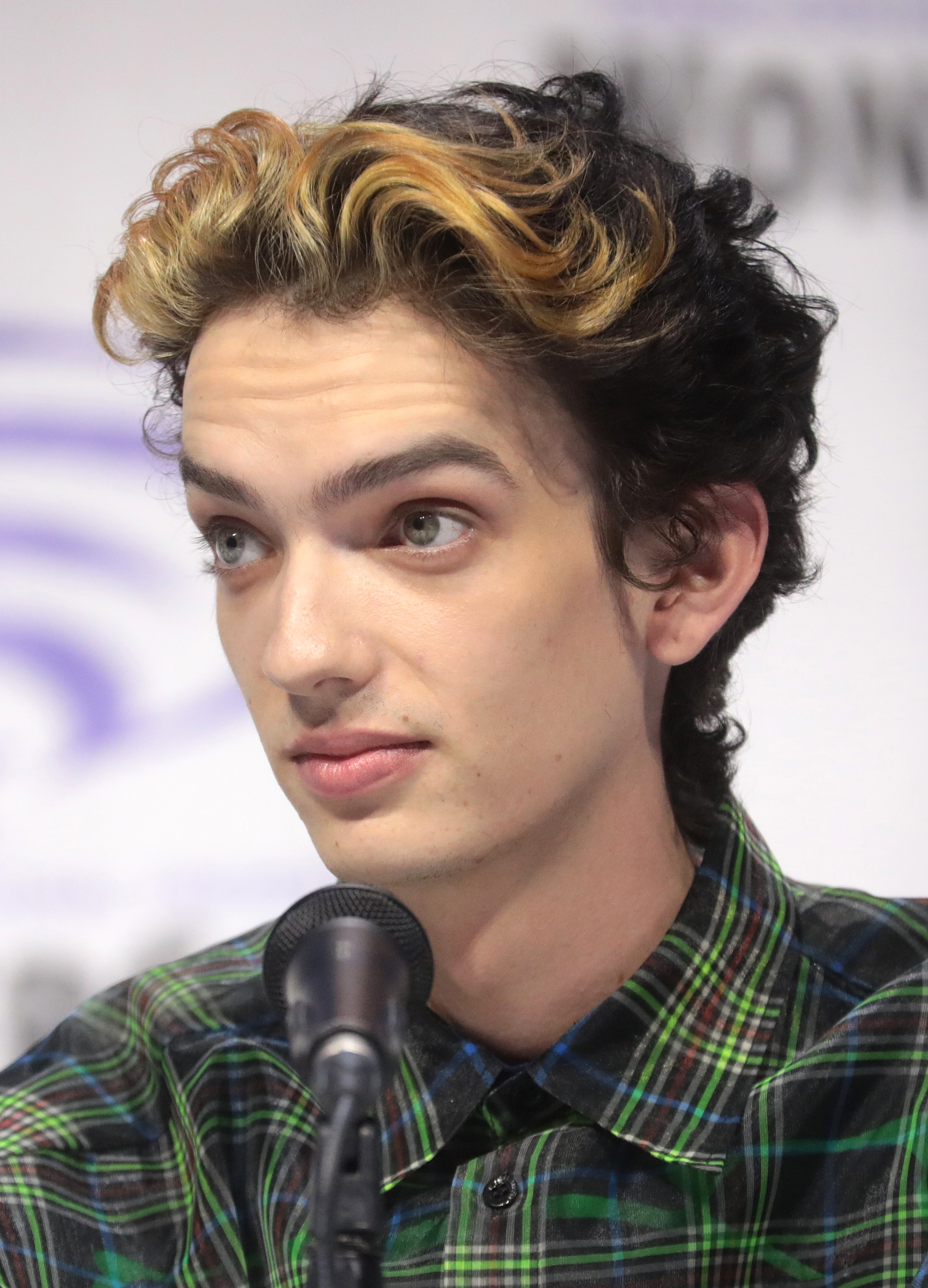
Kodi Smit-McPhee, Supporting Actor of the Year winner

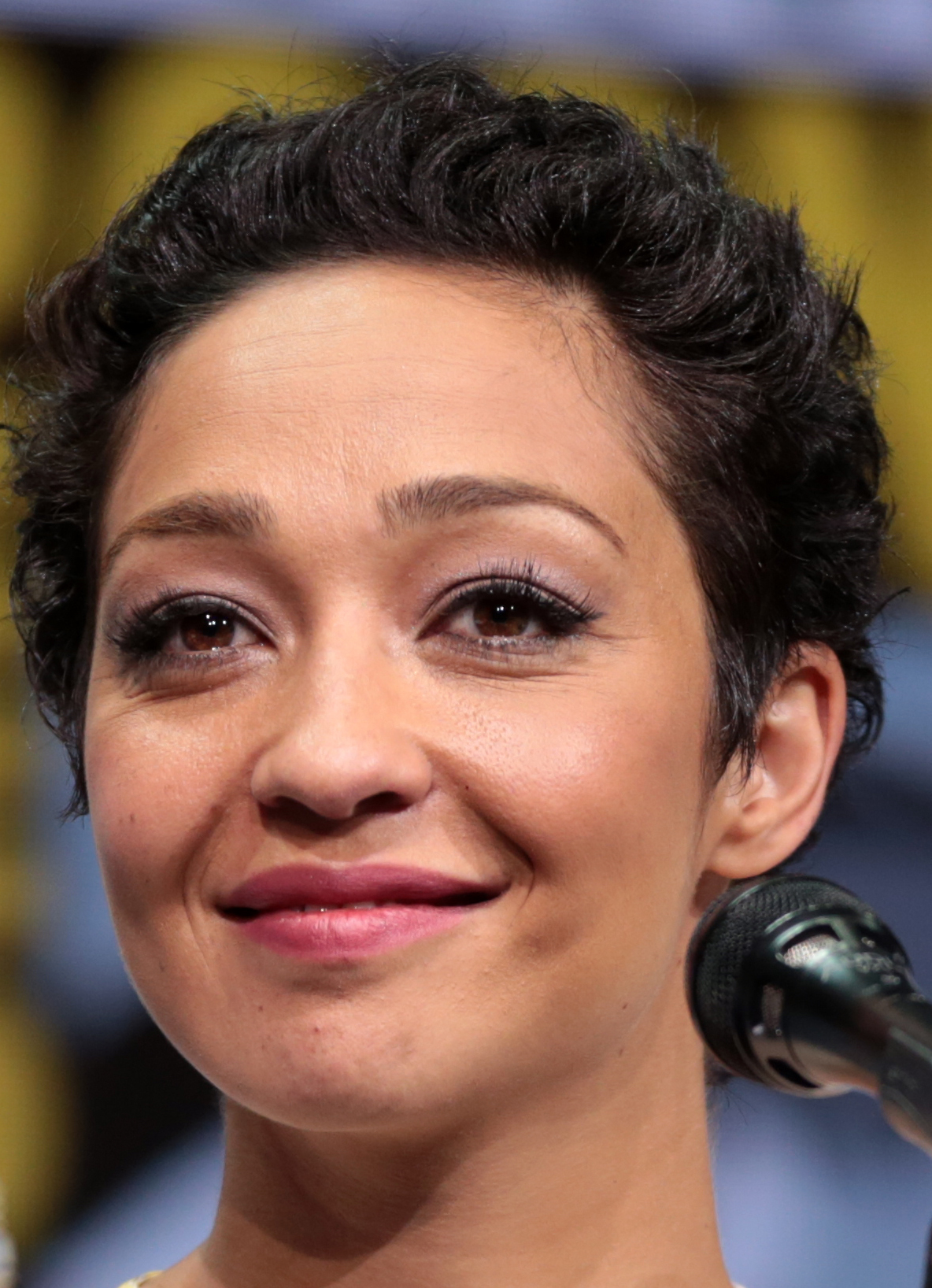
Ruth Negga, Supporting Actress of the Year winner

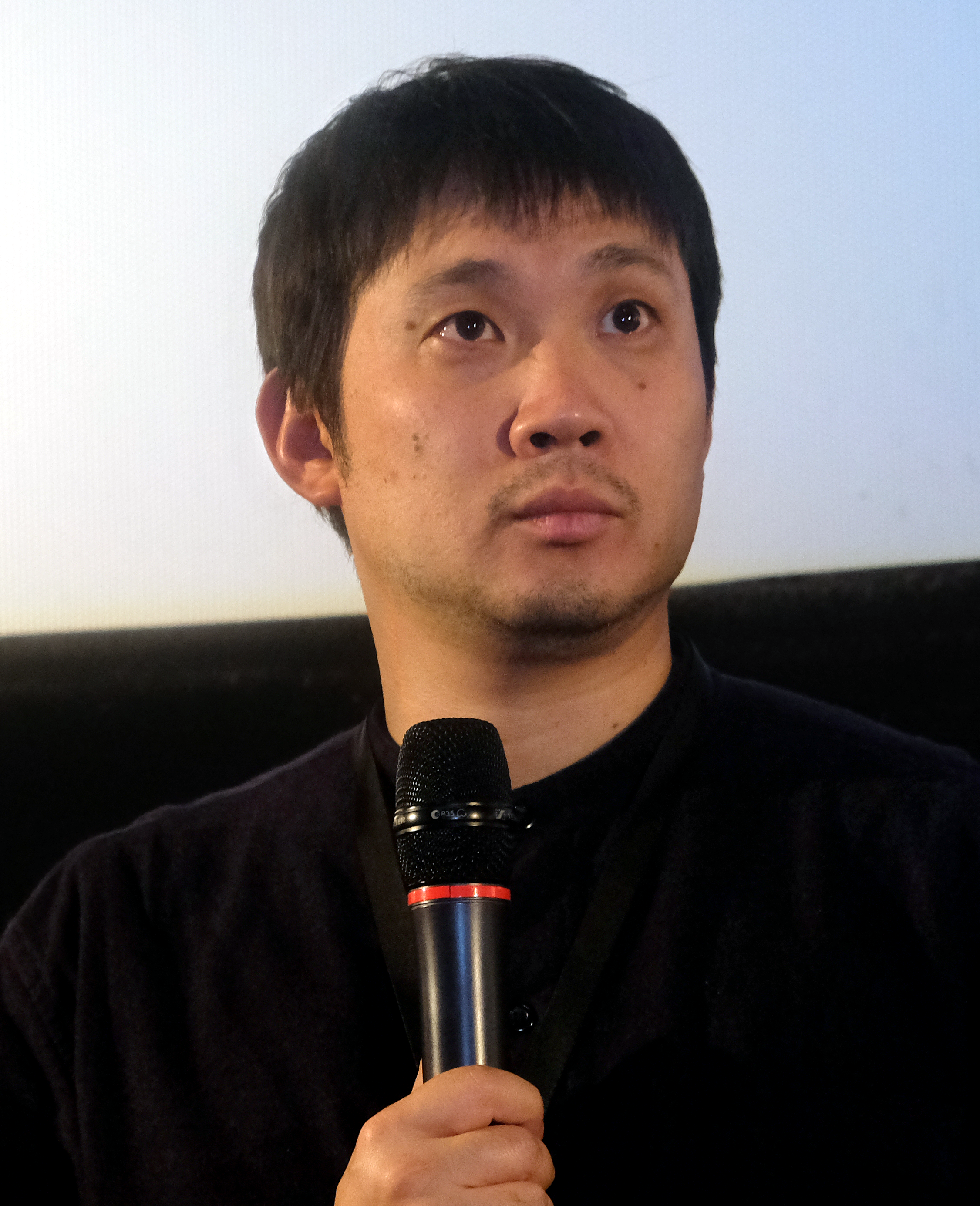
Ryusuke Hamaguchi, Screenwriter of the Year co-winner

Winners are listed first and highlighted with boldface.

Film of the Year	Director of the Year
**The Power of the Dog**; Belfast; Drive My Car; Dune; Licorice Pizza; The Lost Daughter; Memoria; The Souvenir Part II; Titane; West Side Story	**Jane Campion – The Power of the Dog**; Ryusuke Hamaguchi – Drive My Car; Joanna Hogg – The Souvenir Part II; Céline Sciamma – Petite Maman; Denis Villeneuve – Dune
Actor of the Year	Actress of the Year
**Benedict Cumberbatch – The Power of the Dog as Phil Burbank**; Adam Driver – Annette as Henry McHenry; Andrew Garfield – tick, tick... BOOM! as Jonathan Larson; Oscar Isaac – The Card Counter as William Tell; Daniel Kaluuya – Judas and the Black Messiah as Fred Hampton	**Olivia Colman – The Lost Daughter as Leda Caruso**; Penélope Cruz – Parallel Mothers as Janis Martínez; Renate Reinsve – The Worst Person in the World as Julie; Joanna Scanlan – After Love as Mary Hussain; Kristen Stewart – Spencer as Diana Spencer
Supporting Actor of the Year	Supporting Actress of the Year
**Kodi Smit-McPhee – The Power of the Dog as Peter Gordon**; Richard Ayoade – The Souvenir Part II as Patrick; Ciarán Hinds – Belfast as Pop; Jesse Plemons – The Power of the Dog as George Burbank; Jeffrey Wright – The French Dispatch as Roebuck Wright	**Ruth Negga – Passing as Clare Bellew**; Jessie Buckley – The Lost Daughter as Young Leda Caruso; Ariana DeBose – West Side Story as Anita; Kirsten Dunst – The Power of the Dog as Rose Gordon; Rita Moreno – West Side Story as Valentina
Screenwriter of the Year	Foreign Language Film of the Year
**Ryusuke Hamaguchi and Takamasa Oe – Drive My Car**; Paul Thomas Anderson – Licorice Pizza; Wes Anderson – The French Dispatch; Jane Campion – The Power of the Dog; Maggie Gyllenhaal – The Lost Daughter	**Drive My Car**; The Hand of God; Petite Maman; Titane; The Worst Person in the World
Documentary of the Year	The Attenborough Award: British/Irish Film of the Year
**Summer of Soul (...Or, When the Revolution Could Not Be Televised)**; Flee; Gunda; The Most Beautiful Boy in the World; The Velvet Underground	**The Souvenir Part II**; After Love; Belfast; The Green Knight; Limbo
British/Irish Actor of the Year	British/Irish Actress of the Year
**Andrew Garfield – The Eyes of Tammy Faye, Mainstream, Spider-Man: No Way Home, and tick, tick... BOOM!**; Riz Ahmed – Encounter; Adeel Akhtar – Ali & Ava, The Electrical Life of Louis Wain, Everybody's Talking About Jamie, and The Nest; Benedict Cumberbatch – The Courier, The Electrical Life of Louis Wain, and The Power of the Dog; Stephen Graham – Boiling Point and Venom: Let There Be Carnage	**Tilda Swinton – The French Dispatch, Memoria, and The Souvenir Part II**; Jessie Buckley – The Lost Daughter; Olivia Colman – The Electrical Life of Louis Wain, The Lost Daughter, The Mitchells vs. the Machines, Mothering Sunday, and Ron's Gone Wrong; Ruth Negga – Passing and Poly Styrene: I Am a Cliché; Joanna Scanlan – After Love
Young British/Irish Performer of the Year	The Philip French Award: Breakthrough British/Irish Filmmaker of the Year
**Woody Norman – C'mon C'mon as Jesse**; Max Harwood – Everybody's Talking About Jamie as Jamie New / Mimi Me; Jude Hill – Belfast as Buddy; Emilia Jones – CODA as Ruby Rossi; Daniel Lamont – Nowhere Special as Michael	**Rebecca Hall – Passing**; Prano Bailey-Bond – Censor; Aleem Khan – After Love; Marley Morrison – Sweetheart; Ben Sharrock – Limbo
British/Irish Short Film of the Year	Technical Achievement Award
**Play It Safe – Mitch Kalisa**; Diseased and Disorderly – Andrew Kötting; Expensive Shit – Adura Onashile; Know the Grass – Sophie Littman; Precious Hair & Beauty – John Ogunmuyiwa	**Brian Connor, Paul Lambert, Tristan Myles, and Gerd Nefzer – Dune, visual effects**; Jenny Beavan – Cruella, costumes; Fabrizio Federico and Aline Hervé – Martin Eden, film editing; Jonny Greenwood – The Power of the Dog, music; Kenneth Ladekjær – Flee, animation; Hélène Louvart – The Invisible Life of Eurídice Gusmão, cinematography; Andrew Droz Palermo – The Green Knight, cinematography; Justin Peck – West Side Story, choreography; Olivier Schneider – No Time to Die, stunts; Adam Stockhausen – The French Dispatch, production design
