= List of accolades received by Aftersun =

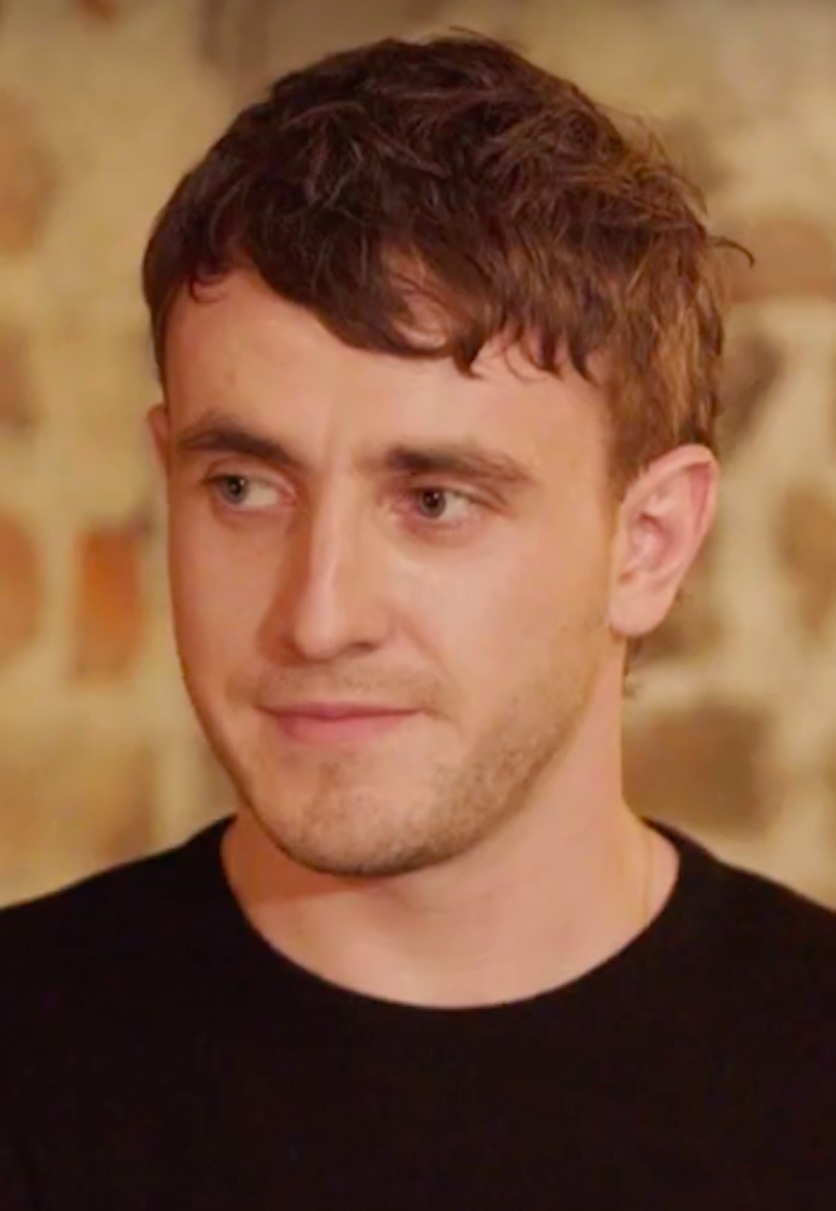
- Paul Mescal received universal acclaim for his performance as Calum Paterson.
Accolades
Award	Wins	Nominations
Academy Awards	0	1
Alliance of Women Film Journalists	0	6
British Independent Film Awards	7	16
Boston Society of Film Critics	2	2
Cannes Film Festival	1	2
Cinema Eye Honors	0	1
Critics' Choice Movie Awards	0	3
Chicago Film Critics Association	1	6
Deauville American Film Festival	2	2
Dublin Film Critics Circle	1	4
European Film Awards	0	1
Florida Film Critics Circle	1	5
Gotham Independent Film Awards	1	4
Hollywood Critics Association	0	3
Independent Spirit Awards	1	5
Los Angeles Film Critics Association	1	1
Melbourne International Film Festival	0	1
Montclair Film Festival	1	1
Munich International Film Festival	1	1
National Board of Review	2	2
New York Film Critics Circle	1	1
National Board of Review	2	2
Sarajevo Film Festival	1	1
Seville European Film Festival	1	1
St. Louis Gateway Film Critics Association	0	1
Washington D.C. Area Film Critics Association	0	2
Zurich Film Festival	0	1

Totals (Note: Certain award groups do not simply award one winner. They acknowledge several different recipients, have runners-up, and have third place. Since this is a specific recognition and is different from losing an award, runner-up mentions are considered wins in this award tally. For simplification and to avoid errors, each award in this list has been presumed to have had a prior nomination.)
- Wins: 54
- Nominations: 145

Aftersun is a 2022 drama film written and directed by Charlotte Wells, starring Paul Mescal, Frankie Corio and Celia Rowlson-Hall. It was released in the United States on 21 October 2022 by A24 and in the United Kingdom on 18 November 2022 by Mubi.

Aftersun is a period film set in the late 1990s and follows Sophie, an 11-year-old Scottish girl, on vacation with her father at a Turkish resort on the eve of his 31st birthday.

The film received universal acclaim from critics, who praised Wells' direction and screenplay, and the performances of Mescal and Corio with the former earning a nomination for Academy Award for Best Actor. It was also named one of the best films of 2022 by the National Board of Review and was awarded top place by Sight and Sound on its poll for the best films of the year.

== Accolades ==
Award	Date of ceremony	Category	Recipient(s)	Result	Ref.
Cannes Film Festival	28 May 2022	Critics' Week Grand Prize	Charlotte Wells	Nominated	
Cannes Film Festival	28 May 2022	French Touch Prize of the Jury	Charlotte Wells	Won	
Munich International Film Festival	2 July 2022	CineVision Award	Charlotte Wells	Won	
Sarajevo Film Festival	19 August 2022	Special Award for the Promotion of Gender Equality	Aftersun	Won	
Melbourne International Film Festival	20 August 2022	Bright Horizons Award	Aftersun	Nominated	
Deauville American Film Festival	10 September 2022	Grand Prize	Aftersun	Won	
Deauville American Film Festival	10 September 2022	Critics Award	Aftersun	Won	
Zurich Film Festival	2 October 2022	Best International Feature Film	Aftersun	Nominated	
Montclair Film Festival	30 October 2022	Fiction Feature	Aftersun	Won	
Seville European Film Festival	12 November 2022	New Waves Award for Best Film	Aftersun	Won	
Gotham Independent Film Awards	28 November 2022	Best Feature	Aftersun	Nominated	
Gotham Independent Film Awards	28 November 2022	Outstanding Lead Performance	Paul Mescal	Nominated	
Gotham Independent Film Awards	28 November 2022	Breakthrough Performer	Frankie Corio	Nominated	
Gotham Independent Film Awards	28 November 2022	Bingham Ray Breakthrough Director Award	Charlotte Wells	Won	
New York Film Critics Circle Awards	2 December 2022	Best First Film	Aftersun	Won	
British Independent Film Awards	4 December 2022	Best British Independent Film	Charlotte Wells, Barry Jenkins, Mark Ceryak, Adele Romanski, Amy Jackson	Won	
British Independent Film Awards	4 December 2022	Best Director	Charlotte Wells	Won	
British Independent Film Awards	4 December 2022	Best Joint Lead Performance	Frankie Corio and Paul Mescal	Nominated	
British Independent Film Awards	4 December 2022	Breakthrough Performance	Frankie Corio	Nominated	
British Independent Film Awards	4 December 2022	Best Screenplay	Charlotte Wells	Won	
British Independent Film Awards	4 December 2022	Douglas Hickox Award (Best Debut Director)	Charlotte Wells	Won	
British Independent Film Awards	4 December 2022	Best Debut Screenwriter	Charlotte Wells	Nominated	
British Independent Film Awards	4 December 2022	Best Casting	Lucy Pardee	Nominated	
British Independent Film Awards	4 December 2022	Best Cinematography	Gregory Oke	Won	
British Independent Film Awards	4 December 2022	Best Costume Design	Frank Gallacher	Nominated	
British Independent Film Awards	4 December 2022	Best Editing	Blair McClendon	Won	
British Independent Film Awards	4 December 2022	Best Make-Up & Hair Design	Oya Aygör, Murat Çağin	Nominated	
British Independent Film Awards	4 December 2022	Best Original Music	Oliver Coates	Nominated	
British Independent Film Awards	4 December 2022	Best Music Supervision	Lucy Bright	Won	
British Independent Film Awards	4 December 2022	Best Production Design	Bailur Turan	Nominated	
British Independent Film Awards	4 December 2022	Best Sound	Jovan Adjer, Vijay Rathinam	Nominated	
National Board of Review	8 December 2022	Top 10 Films	Aftersun	Won	
National Board of Review	8 December 2022	Best Directorial Debut	Charlotte Wells	Won	
European Film Awards	10 December 2022	Best Actor	Paul Mescal	Nominated	
Boston Society of Film Critics	11 December 2022	Best New Filmmaker	Charlotte Wells	Won	
Boston Society of Film Critics	11 December 2022	Best Editing	Blair McClendon	Won	
Los Angeles Film Critics Association	11 December 2022	Best Editing	Blair McClendon	Won	
New York Film Critics Online	11 December 2022	Best Debut Director	Charlotte Wells	Won	
Washington D.C. Area Film Critics Association	12 December 2022	Best Actor	Paul Mescal	Nominated	
Washington D.C. Area Film Critics Association	12 December 2022	Best Youth Performance	Frankie Corio	Nominated	
Chicago Film Critics Association	14 December 2022	Best Film	Aftersun	Nominated	
Chicago Film Critics Association	14 December 2022	Best Actor	Paul Mescal	Nominated	
Chicago Film Critics Association	14 December 2022	Best Original Screenplay	Charlotte Wells	Nominated	
Chicago Film Critics Association	14 December 2022	Best Best Editing	Blair McClendon	Nominated	
Chicago Film Critics Association	14 December 2022	Milos Stehlik Breakthrough Filmmaker Award	Charlotte Wells	Won	
Chicago Film Critics Association	14 December 2022	Most Promising Performer	Frankie Corio	Nominated	
Dublin Film Critics Circle	15 December 2022	Best Film	Aftersun	Nominated	
Dublin Film Critics Circle	15 December 2022	Best Director	Charlotte Wells	Won	
Dublin Film Critics Circle	15 December 2022	Best Screenplay	Charlotte Wells	Nominated	
Dublin Film Critics Circle	15 December 2022	Best Actor	Paul Mescal	Nominated	
St. Louis Gateway Film Critics Association	18 December 2022	Best Actor	Paul Mescal	Nominated	
Florida Film Critics Circle	22 December 2022	Best Picture	Aftersun	Nominated	
Florida Film Critics Circle	22 December 2022	Best Director	Charlotte Wells	Nominated	
Florida Film Critics Circle	22 December 2022	Best First Film	Charlotte Wells	Won	
Florida Film Critics Circle	22 December 2022	Best Actor	Paul Mescal	Nominated	
Florida Film Critics Circle	22 December 2022	Breakout Award	Frankie Corio	Runner-up	
Alliance of Women Film Journalists	5 January 2023	Best Director	Charlotte Wells	Nominated	
Alliance of Women Film Journalists	5 January 2023	Best Screenplay, Original	Charlotte Wells	Nominated	
Alliance of Women Film Journalists	5 January 2023	Best Woman Director	Charlotte Wells	Nominated	
Alliance of Women Film Journalists	5 January 2023	Best Woman Screenwriter	Charlotte Wells	Nominated	
Alliance of Women Film Journalists	5 January 2023	Best Actor	Paul Mescal	Nominated	
Alliance of Women Film Journalists	5 January 2023	Best Woman’s Breakthrough Performance	Frankie Corio	Nominated	
National Society of Film Critics	7 January 2023	Best Picture	Aftersun	Runner-up	
National Society of Film Critics	7 January 2023	Best Director	Charlotte Wells	Won	
National Society of Film Critics	7 January 2023	Best Actor	Paul Mescal	Runner-up	
Toronto Film Critics Association	8 January 2023	Best Picture	Aftersun	Won	
Toronto Film Critics Association	8 January 2023	Best Director	Charlotte Wells	Won	
Toronto Film Critics Association	8 January 2023	Best Actor	Paul Mescal	Won	
Toronto Film Critics Association	8 January 2023	Best First Feature	Aftersun	Won	
San Francisco Bay Area Film Critics Circle	9 January 2023	Best Director	Charlotte Wells	Nominated	
San Francisco Bay Area Film Critics Circle	9 January 2023	Best Original Screenplay	Charlotte Wells	Nominated	
San Francisco Bay Area Film Critics Circle	9 January 2023	Best Actor	Paul Mescal	Nominated	
San Francisco Bay Area Film Critics Circle	9 January 2023	Best Film Editing	Blair McClendon	Nominated	
Austin Film Critics Association	10 January 2023	Best First Film	Charlotte Wells	Won	
Austin Film Critics Association	10 January 2023	Best Actor	Paul Mescal	Nominated	
Austin Film Critics Association	10 January 2023	The Robert R. "Bobby" McCurdy Memorial Breakthrough Artist Award	Frankie Corio	Nominated	
Cinema Eye Honors	12 January 2023	Heterodox Award	Aftersun	Won	
Georgia Film Critics Association	13 January 2023	Best Actor	Paul Mescal	Nominated	
Critics Choice Awards	15 January 2023	Best Actor	Paul Mescal	Nominated	
Critics Choice Awards	15 January 2023	Best Young Actor/Actress	Frankie Corio	Nominated	
Critics Choice Awards	15 January 2023	Best Original Screenplay	Charlotte Wells	Nominated	
Seattle Film Critics Society	17 January 2023	Best Picture	Aftersun	Nominated	
Seattle Film Critics Society	17 January 2023	Best Director	Charlotte Wells	Nominated	
Seattle Film Critics Society	17 January 2023	Best Actor in a Leading Role	Paul Mescal	Nominated	
Seattle Film Critics Society	17 January 2023	Best Film Editing	Blair McClendon	Nominated	
Seattle Film Critics Society	17 January 2023	Best Youth Performance	Frankie Corio	Won	
Online Film Critics Society	23 January 2023	Best Picture	Aftersun	8th place	
Online Film Critics Society	23 January 2023	Best Director	Charlotte Wells	Nominated	
Online Film Critics Society	23 January 2023	Best Debut Feature	Charlotte Wells	Won	
Online Film Critics Society	23 January 2023	Best Lead Actor	Paul Mescal	Nominated	
London Film Critics' Circle	5 February 2023	Film of the Year	Aftersun	Nominated	
London Film Critics' Circle	5 February 2023	British/Irish Film of the Year	Aftersun	Nominated	
London Film Critics' Circle	5 February 2023	Director of the Year	Charlotte Wells	Nominated	
London Film Critics' Circle	5 February 2023	Screenwriter of the Year	Charlotte Wells	Nominated	
London Film Critics' Circle	5 February 2023	Breakthrough British/Irish Filmmaker of the Year	Charlotte Wells	Won	
London Film Critics' Circle	5 February 2023	Actor of the Year	Paul Mescal	Nominated	
London Film Critics' Circle	5 February 2023	British/Irish Actor of the Year (for body of work)	Paul Mescal	Nominated	
London Film Critics' Circle	5 February 2023	Young British/Irish Performer of the Year	Frankie Corio	Won	
International Cinephile Society	12 February 2023	Best Picture	Aftersun	3rd place	
International Cinephile Society	12 February 2023	Best Director	Charlotte Wells	Nominated	
International Cinephile Society	12 February 2023	Best Original Screenplay	Charlotte Wells	Nominated	
International Cinephile Society	12 February 2023	Best Debut Feature	Charlotte Wells	Won	
International Cinephile Society	12 February 2023	Best Actor	Paul Mescal	Won	
International Cinephile Society	12 February 2023	Breakthrough Performance	Frankie Corio	Won	
International Cinephile Society	12 February 2023	Best Cinematography	Gregory Oke	Nominated	
International Cinephile Society	12 February 2023	Best Editing	Blair McClendon	Won	
International Cinephile Society	12 February 2023	Best Score	Oliver Coates	Nominated	
International Cinephile Society	12 February 2023	Best Sound Design	Jovan Ajder	Nominated	
Vancouver Film Critics Circle	13 February 2023	Best Male Actor	Paul Mescal	Nominated	
Vancouver Film Critics Circle	13 February 2023	Best Female Supporting Actress	Frankie Corio	Nominated	
Directors Guild of America Awards	18 February 2023	Outstanding Directorial Achievement in First-Time Theatrical Feature Film	Charlotte Wells	Won	
British Academy Film Awards	19 February 2023	Outstanding British Film	Aftersun	Nominated	
British Academy Film Awards	19 February 2023	Outstanding Debut by a British Writer, Director or Producer	Charlotte Wells (writer/director)	Won	
British Academy Film Awards	19 February 2023	Best Actor in a Leading Role	Paul Mescal	Nominated	
British Academy Film Awards	19 February 2023	Best Casting	Lucy Pardee	Nominated	
Dorian Film Awards	23 February 2023	Film of the Year	Aftersun	Nominated	
Dorian Film Awards	23 February 2023	Unsung Film of the Year	Aftersun	Won	
Dorian Film Awards	23 February 2023	Director of the Year	Charlotte Wells	Nominated	
Dorian Film Awards	23 February 2023	Screenplay of the Year	Charlotte Wells	Nominated	
Dorian Film Awards	23 February 2023	Lead Film Performance of the Year	Paul Mescal	Nominated	
Dorian Film Awards	23 February 2023	Rising Star Award	Frankie Corio	Nominated	
Hollywood Critics Association	24 February 2023	Best Actor	Paul Mescal	Nominated	
Hollywood Critics Association	24 February 2023	Best First Feature	Charlotte Wells	Won	
Hollywood Critics Association	24 February 2023	Best Indie Film	Aftersun	Nominated	
Independent Spirit Awards	4 March 2023	Best First Feature	Charlotte Wells, Mark Ceryak, Amy Jackson, Barry Jenkins, Adele Romanski	Won	
Independent Spirit Awards	4 March 2023	Best Lead Performance	Paul Mescal	Nominated	
Independent Spirit Awards	4 March 2023	Best Breakthrough Performance	Frankie Corio	Nominated	
Independent Spirit Awards	4 March 2023	Best Cinematography	Gregory Oke	Nominated	
Independent Spirit Awards	4 March 2023	Best Editing	Blair McClendon	Nominated	
Academy Awards	12 March 2023	Best Actor	Paul Mescal	Nominated	
Chlotrudis Awards	22 March 2023	Best Movie	Aftersun	Nominated	
Chlotrudis Awards	22 March 2023	Best Director	Charlotte Wells	Nominated	
Chlotrudis Awards	22 March 2023	Best Original Screenplay	Charlotte Wells	Won	
Chlotrudis Awards	22 March 2023	Best Actor	Paul Mescal	Won	
Chlotrudis Awards	22 March 2023	Best Use of Music in a Film	Lucie Bright	Nominated	
Chlotrudis Awards	22 March 2023	Best Editing	Blair McClendon	Nominated	
Irish Film & Television Academy Awards	7 May 2023	Best Actor	Paul Mescal	Won	
Irish Film & Television Academy Awards	7 May 2023	Best International Film	Aftersun	Nominated	
BAFTA Scotland Awards	19 November 2023	Best Feature Film	Aftersun	Nominated	
BAFTA Scotland Awards	19 November 2023	Best Director Fiction	Charlotte Wells	Won	
BAFTA Scotland Awards	19 November 2023	Best Actor Film	Paul Mescal	Won	
BAFTA Scotland Awards	19 November 2023	Best Actress Film	Frankie Corio	Nominated	
BAFTA Scotland Awards	19 November 2023	Best Writer Film/Television	Charlotte Wells	Won	
Gaudí Awards	4 February 2024	Best European Film	Aftersun	Nominated	
Goya Awards	10 February 2024	Best European Film	Aftersun	Nominated	
