= 75th British Academy Film Awards =

2022 film award ceremony

- Date: 13 March 2022
- Site: Royal Albert Hall, London
- Hosted by: Rebel Wilson

Highlights
- Best Film: The Power of the Dog
- Best British Film: Belfast
- Best Actor: Will Smith; King Richard
- Best Actress: Joanna Scanlan; After Love
- Most awards: Dune (5)
- Most nominations: Dune (11)

The 75th British Academy Film Awards, also known as the BAFTAs, were held on 13 March 2022 at the Royal Albert Hall in London, honouring the best national and foreign films of 2021. Presented by the British Academy of Film and Television Arts, accolades were handed out for the best feature-length film and documentaries of any nationality that were screened at British cinemas in 2021.

The nominations were announced on 3 February 2022. The Rising Star Award nominees, which is the only category voted for by the British public, were announced on 1 February 2022; the nomination and eventual win of Lashana Lynch confused commentators, who did not consider her "rising".

The epic science fiction film Dune received the most nominations with eleven; The Power of the Dog and Belfast followed with eight and six, respectively. The former ultimately won two—Best Film and Best Director (Jane Campion); Dune received the most wins, with five, but did not take home any major category awards.

The ceremony was hosted by actress and comedian Rebel Wilson. Many winners were not present to collect their awards, though the ceremony was exclusively in-person. This allowed the speeches of winners who were present to go on at length. While many awards were won by frontrunners in the Oscars race, a surprise win came in the Best Actress category – already populated by no Oscar nominees – for Welsh actress Joanna Scanlan for her performance in After Love.

== Winners and nominees ==
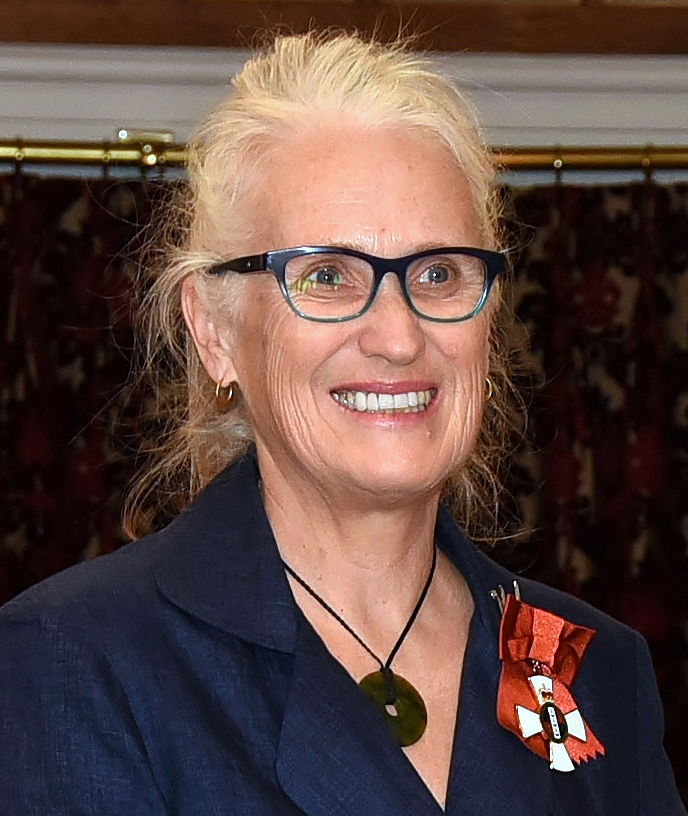
Jane Campion, Best Film co-winner and Best Director winner

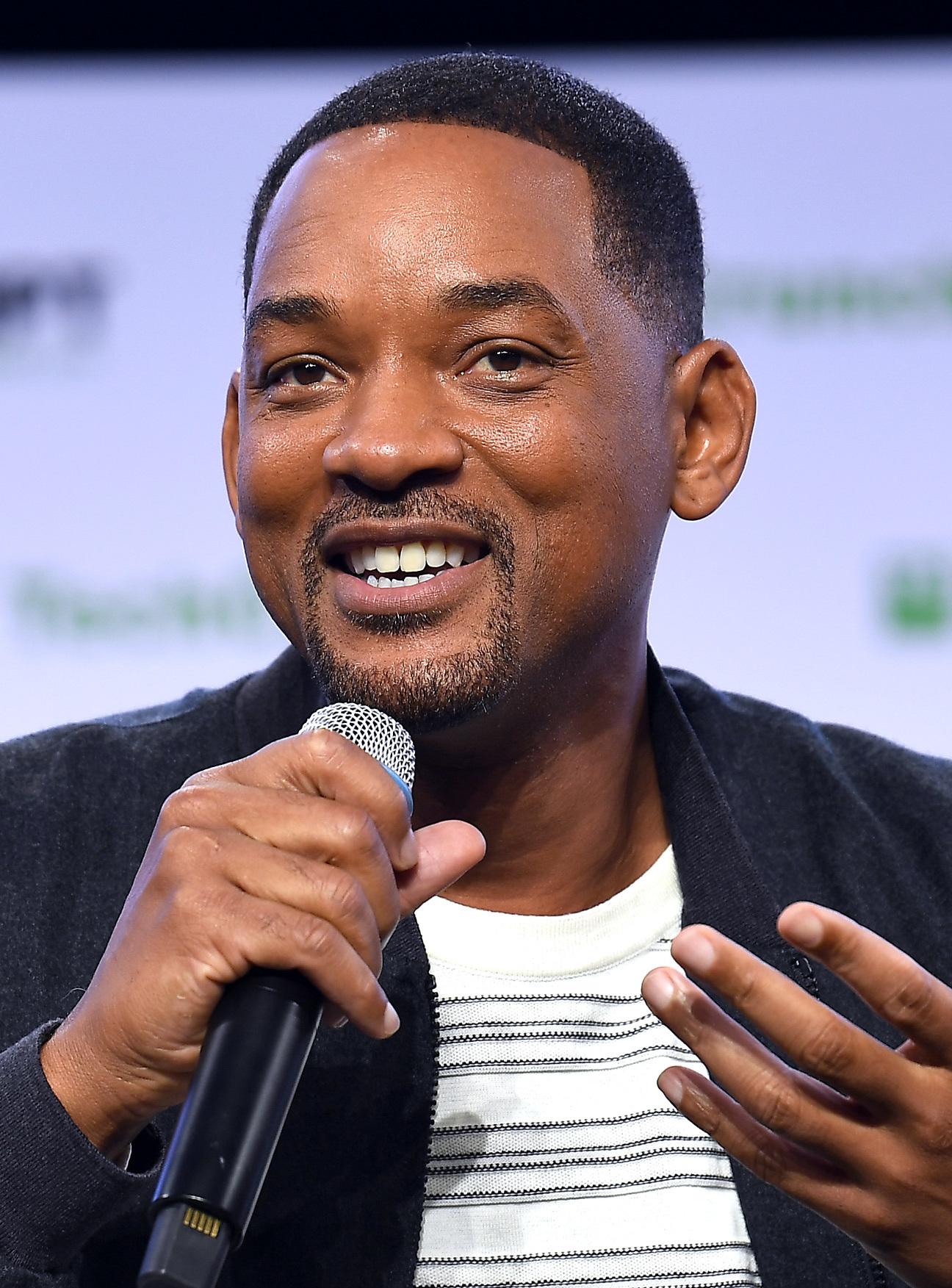
Will Smith, Best Actor winner

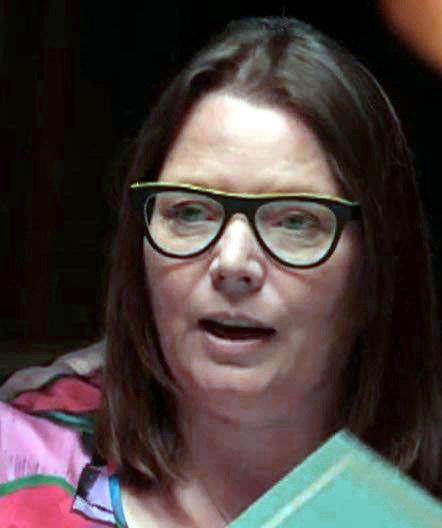
Joanna Scanlan, Best Actress winner

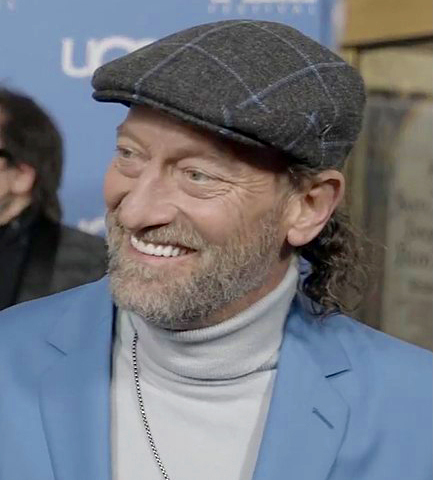
Troy Kotsur, Best Supporting Actor winner

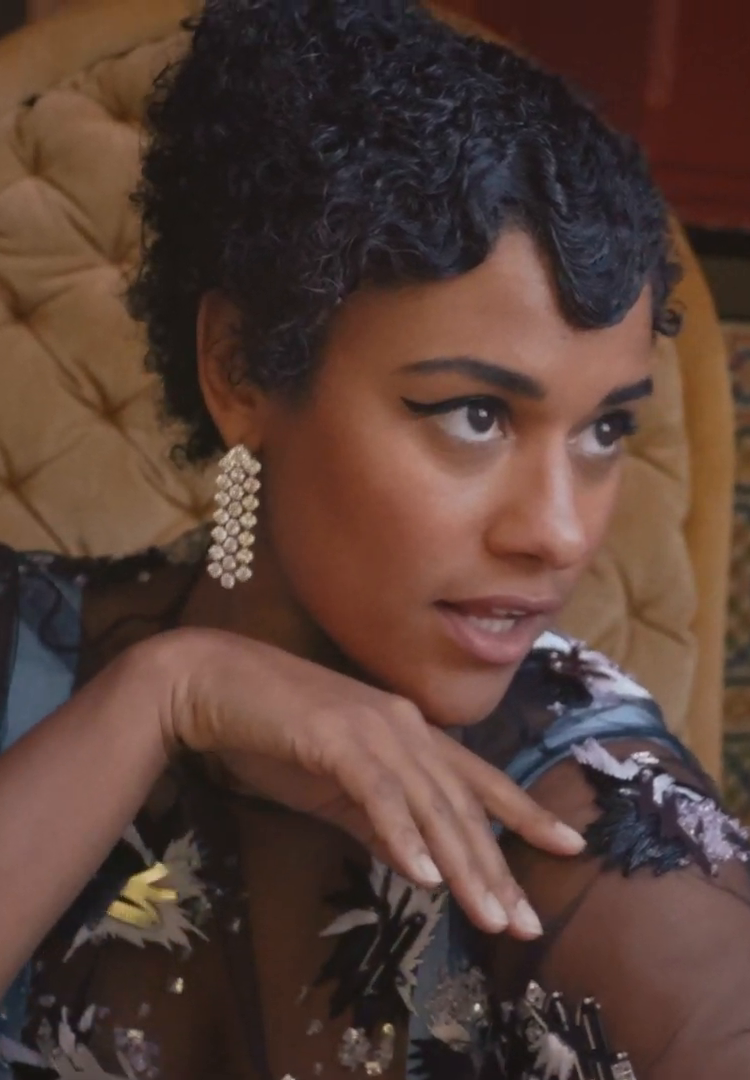
Ariana DeBose, Best Supporting Actress winner

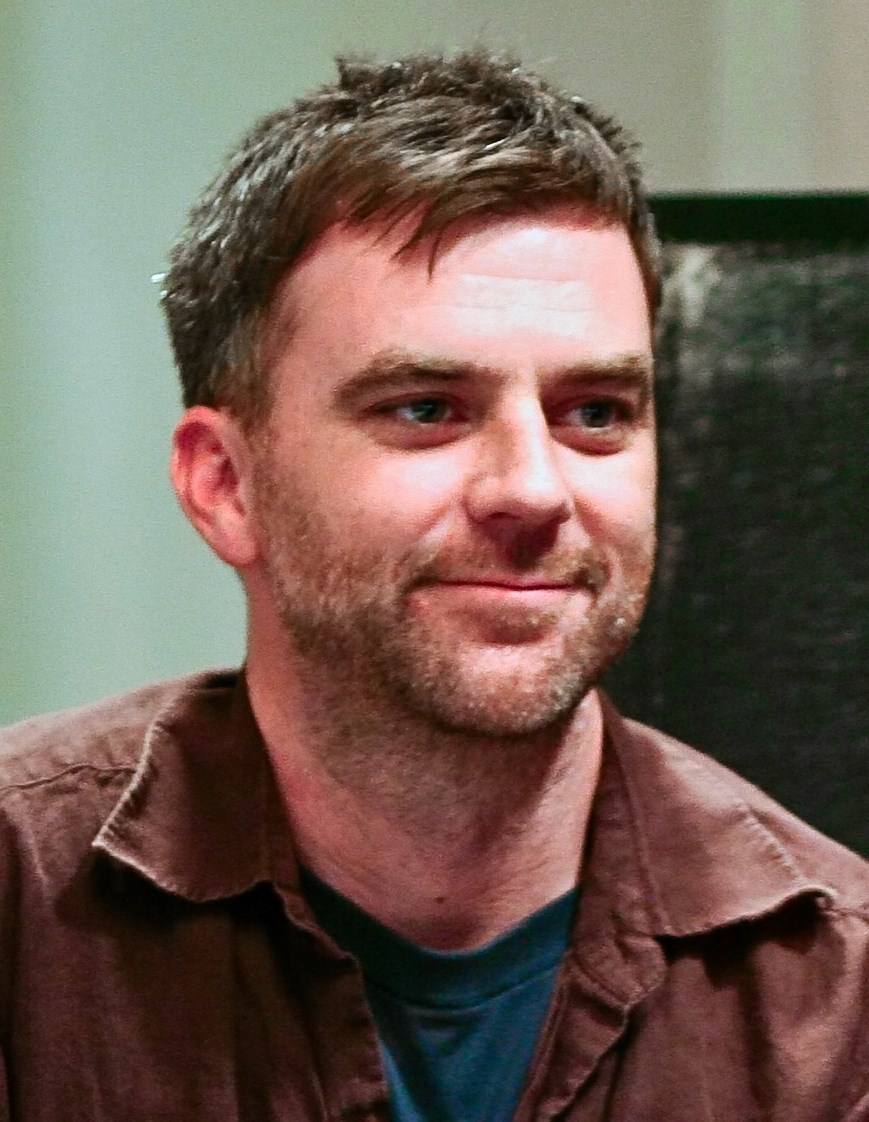
Paul Thomas Anderson, Best Original Screenplay winner

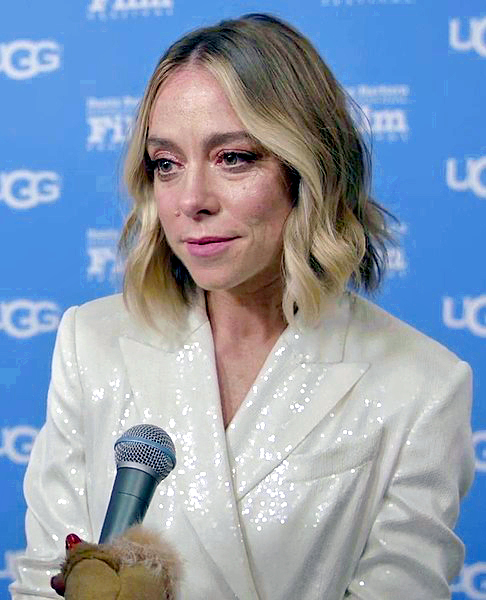
Sian Heder, Best Adapted Screenplay winner

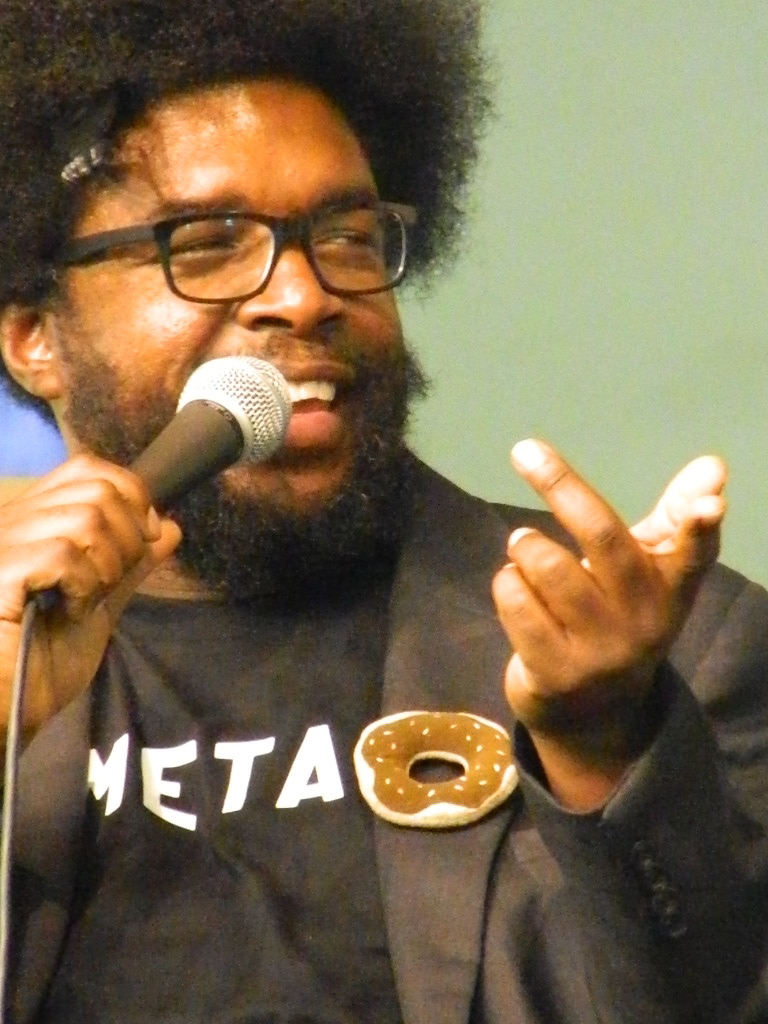
Ahmir "Questlove" Thompson, Best Documentary co-winner

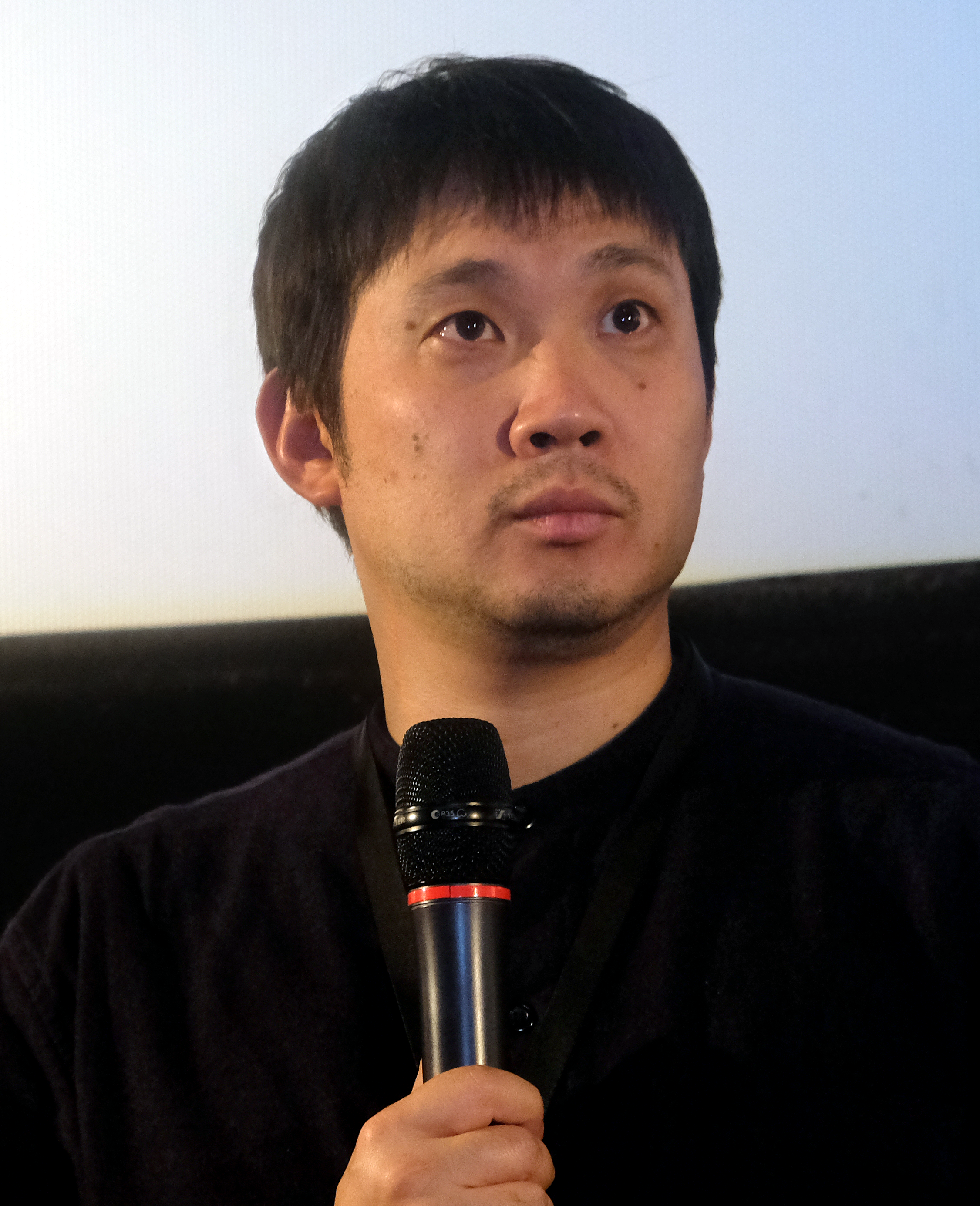
Ryusuke Hamaguchi, Best Film Not in the English Language co-winner

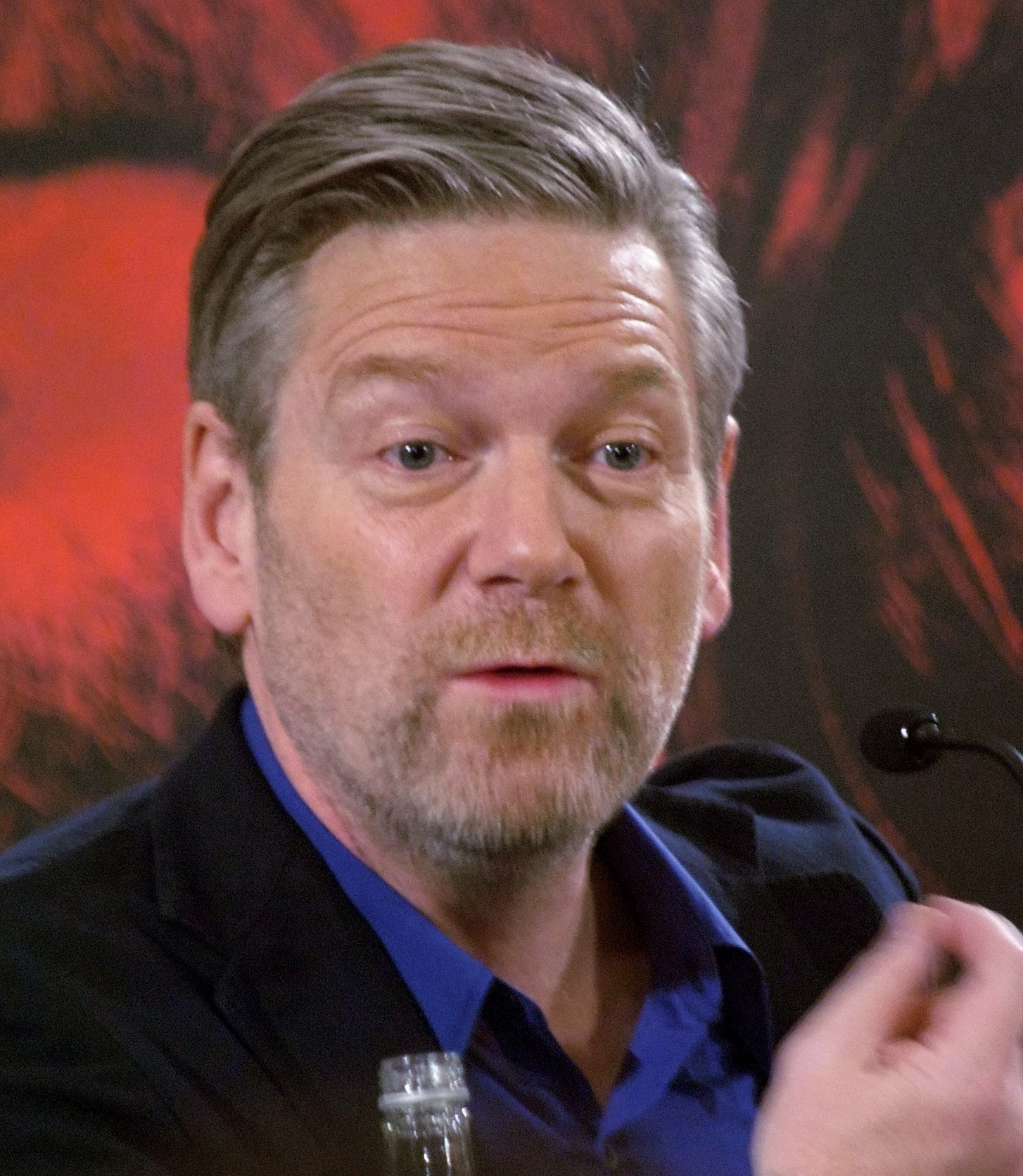
Kenneth Branagh, Outstanding British Film co-winner

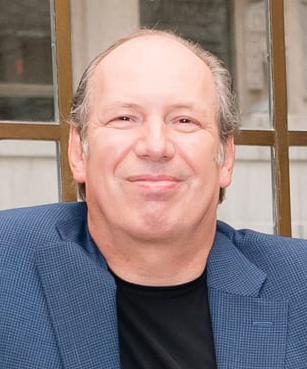
Hans Zimmer, Best Original Score winner

The nominees were announced on 3 February 2022. The winners were announced on 13 March 2022.

This year, BAFTA did not hand out two of its honorary awards—BAFTA Fellowship and BAFTA Outstanding British Contribution to Cinema Award—as it plans to implement new vetting processes following the previous year's controversy surrounding Noel Clarke.

=== Awards ===
Winners are listed first and highlighted in boldface.

**Best Film**: **The Power of the Dog – Jane Campion, Iain Canning, Roger Frappier, Tanya Seghatchian and Emile Sherman**; Belfast – Laura Berwick, Kenneth Branagh, Becca Kovacik and Tamar Thomas; Don't Look Up – Adam McKay and Kevin Messick; Dune – Cale Boyter, Mary Parent and Denis Villeneuve; Licorice Pizza – Paul Thomas Anderson, Sara Murphy and Adam Somner	**Best Director**: **Jane Campion – The Power of the Dog**; Paul Thomas Anderson – Licorice Pizza; Audrey Diwan – Happening; Julia Ducournau – Titane; Ryusuke Hamaguchi – Drive My Car; Aleem Khan – After Love
**Best Actor in a Leading Role**: **Will Smith – King Richard as Richard Williams**; Adeel Akhtar – Ali & Ava as Ali; Mahershala Ali – Swan Song as Cameron Turner; Benedict Cumberbatch – The Power of the Dog as Phil Burbank; Leonardo DiCaprio – Don't Look Up as Dr. Randall Mindy; Stephen Graham – Boiling Point as Andy Jones	**Best Actress in a Leading Role**: **Joanna Scanlan – After Love as Mary Hussain**; Lady Gaga – House of Gucci as Patrizia Reggiani; Alana Haim – Licorice Pizza as Alana Kane; Emilia Jones – CODA as Ruby Rossi; Renate Reinsve – The Worst Person in the World as Julie; Tessa Thompson – Passing as Irene Redfield
**Best Actor in a Supporting Role**: **Troy Kotsur – CODA as Frank Rossi**; Mike Faist – West Side Story as Riff; Ciarán Hinds – Belfast as Pop; Woody Norman – C'mon C'mon as Jesse; Jesse Plemons – The Power of the Dog as George Burbank; Kodi Smit-McPhee – The Power of the Dog as Peter Gordon	**Best Actress in a Supporting Role**: **Ariana DeBose – West Side Story as Anita**; Caitríona Balfe – Belfast as Ma; Jessie Buckley – The Lost Daughter as Young Leda Caruso; Ann Dowd – Mass as Linda; Aunjanue Ellis-Taylor – King Richard as Oracene "Brandy" Price; Ruth Negga – Passing as Clare Bellew
**Best Original Screenplay**: **Licorice Pizza – Paul Thomas Anderson**; Being the Ricardos – Aaron Sorkin; Belfast – Kenneth Branagh; Don't Look Up – Adam McKay; King Richard – Zach Baylin	**Best Adapted Screenplay**: **CODA – Sian Heder**; Drive My Car – Ryusuke Hamaguchi and Takamasa Oe; Dune – Eric Roth, Jon Spaihts and Denis Villeneuve; The Lost Daughter – Maggie Gyllenhaal; The Power of the Dog – Jane Campion
**Best Animated Film**: **Encanto – Jared Bush, Byron Howard, Yvett Merino and Clark Spencer**; Luca – Enrico Casarosa and Andrea Warren; Flee – Jonas Poher Rasmussen and Monica Hellström; The Mitchells vs. the Machines – Mike Rianda, Phil Lord and Christopher Miller	**Best Documentary**: **Summer of Soul (...Or, When the Revolution Could Not Be Televised) – Ahmir "Questlove" Thompson, David Dinerstein, Robert Fyvolent, and Joseph Patel**; Becoming Cousteau – Liz Garbus and Dan Cogan; Cow – Andrea Arnold and Kat Mansoor; Flee – Jonas Poher Rasmussen and Monica Hellström; The Rescue – Elizabeth Chai Vasarhelyi, Jimmy Chin, John Battsek and P.J. van Sandwijk
**Best Film Not in the English Language**: **Drive My Car – Ryusuke Hamaguchi and Teruhisa Yamamoto**; The Hand of God – Paolo Sorrentino and Lorenzo Mieli; Parallel Mothers – Pedro Almodóvar and Agustín Almodóvar; Petite Maman – Céline Sciamma and Bénédicte Couvreur; The Worst Person in the World – Joachim Trier and Thomas Robsahm	**Best Casting**: **West Side Story – Cindy Tolan**; Boiling Point – Carolyn McLeod; Dune – Francine Maisler; The Hand of God – Massimo Appolloni and Annamaria Sambucco; King Richard – Rich Delia and Avy Kaufman
**Best Cinematography**: **Dune – Greig Fraser**; Nightmare Alley – Dan Laustsen; No Time to Die – Linus Sandgren; The Power of the Dog – Ari Wegner; The Tragedy of Macbeth – Bruno Delbonnel	**Best Costume Design**: **Cruella – Jenny Beavan**; Cyrano – Massimo Cantini Parrini; Dune – Robert Morgan and Jacqueline West; The French Dispatch – Milena Canonero; Nightmare Alley – Luis Sequeira
**Best Editing**: **No Time to Die – Tom Cross and Elliot Graham**; Belfast – Úna Ní Dhonghaíle; Dune – Joe Walker; Licorice Pizza – Andy Jurgensen; Summer of Soul (...Or, When the Revolution Could Not Be Televised) – Joshua L. Pearson	**Best Make Up & Hair**: **The Eyes of Tammy Faye – Linda Dowds, Stephanie Ingram and Justin Raleigh**; Cruella – Naomi Donne and Nadia Stacey; Cyrano – Alessandro Bertolazzi and Siân Miller; Dune – Love Larson and Donald Mowat; House of Gucci – Frederic Aspiras, Jana Carboni, Giuliano Mariano and Sarah Nicole Tanno
**Best Original Score**: **Dune – Hans Zimmer**; Being the Ricardos – Daniel Pemberton; Don't Look Up – Nicholas Britell; The French Dispatch – Alexandre Desplat; The Power of the Dog – Jonny Greenwood	**Best Production Design**: **Dune – Patrice Vermette and Zsuzsanna Sipos**; Cyrano – Sarah Greenwood and Katie Spencer; The French Dispatch – Adam Stockhausen and Rena DeAngelo; Nightmare Alley – Tamara Deverell and Shane Vieau; West Side Story – Adam Stockhausen and Rena DeAngelo
**Best Sound**: **Dune – Ron Bartlett, Theo Green, Doug Hemphill, Mark Mangini and Mac Ruth**; Last Night in Soho – Tim Cavagin, Dan Morgan, Colin Nicolson and Julian Slater; No Time to Die – James Harrison, Simon Hayes, Paul Massey, Oliver Tarney and Mark Taylor; A Quiet Place Part II – Erik Aadahl, Michael Barosky, Brandon Proctor and Ethan Van der Ryn; West Side Story – Brian Chumney, Tod A. Maitland, Andy Nelson and Gary Rydstrom	**Best Special Visual Effects**: **Dune – Brian Connor, Paul Lambert, Tristan Myles and Gerd Nefzer**; Free Guy – Swen Gillberg, Bryan Grill, Nikos Kalaitzidis and Dan Sudick; Ghostbusters: Afterlife – Aharon Bourland, Sheena Duggal, Pier Lefebvre and Alessandro Ongaro; The Matrix Resurrections – Tom Debenham, Huw J. Evans, Dan Glass and J. D. Schwalm; No Time to Die – Mark Bakowski, Chris Corbould, Joel Green and Charlie Noble
**Outstanding British Film**: **Belfast – Kenneth Branagh, Laura Berwick, Becca Kovacik and Tamar Thomas**; After Love – Aleem Khan and Matthieu de Braconier; Ali & Ava – Clio Barnard and Tracy O'Riordan; Boiling Point – Philip Barantini, Bart Ruspoli, Hester Ruoff and James Cummings; Cyrano – Joe Wright, Tim Bevan, Eric Fellner, Guy Heeley and Erica Schmidt; Everybody's Talking About Jamie – Jonathan Butterell, Peter Carlton, Mark Herbert and Tom MacRae; House of Gucci – Ridley Scott, Mark Huffam, Giannina Scott, Kevin J. Walsh, Roberto Bentivegna and Becky Johnston; Last Night in Soho – Edgar Wright, Tim Bevan, Eric Fellner, Nira Park and Krysty Wilson-Cairns; No Time to Die – Cary Joji Fukunaga, Barbara Broccoli, Michael G. Wilson, Neal Purvis, Robert Wade and Phoebe Waller-Bridge; Passing – Rebecca Hall, Margot Hand, Nina Yang Bongiovi and Forest Whitaker	**Outstanding Debut by a British Writer, Director or Producer**: **The Harder They Fall – Jeymes Samuel (Writer/Director) [also written by Boaz Yakin]**; After Love – Aleem Khan (Writer/Director); Boiling Point – James Cummings (Writer) and Hester Ruoff (Producer) [also written by Philip Barantini and produced by Bart Ruspoli]; Keyboard Fantasies – Posy Dixon (Writer/Director) and Liv Proctor (Producer); Passing – Rebecca Hall (Writer/Director)
**Best British Short Animation**: **Do Not Feed the Pigeons – Vladimir Krasilnikov, Jordi Morera and Antonin Niclass**; Affairs of the Art – Les Mills and Joanna Quinn; Night of the Living Dread – Danielle Goff, Hannah Kelso, Ida Melum and Laura Jayne Tunbridge	**Best British Short Film**: **The Black Cop – Cherish Oteka**; Femme – Sam H. Freeman, Ng Choon Ping, Sam Ritzenberg and Hayley Williams; The Palace – Jo Prichard; Stuffed – Joss Holden-Rea and Theo Rhys; Three Meetings of the Extraordinary Committee – Max Barron, Daniel Wheldon and Michael Woodward
**Rising Star Award**: **Lashana Lynch**; Ariana DeBose; Harris Dickinson; Millicent Simmonds; Kodi Smit-McPhee

== Ceremony information ==
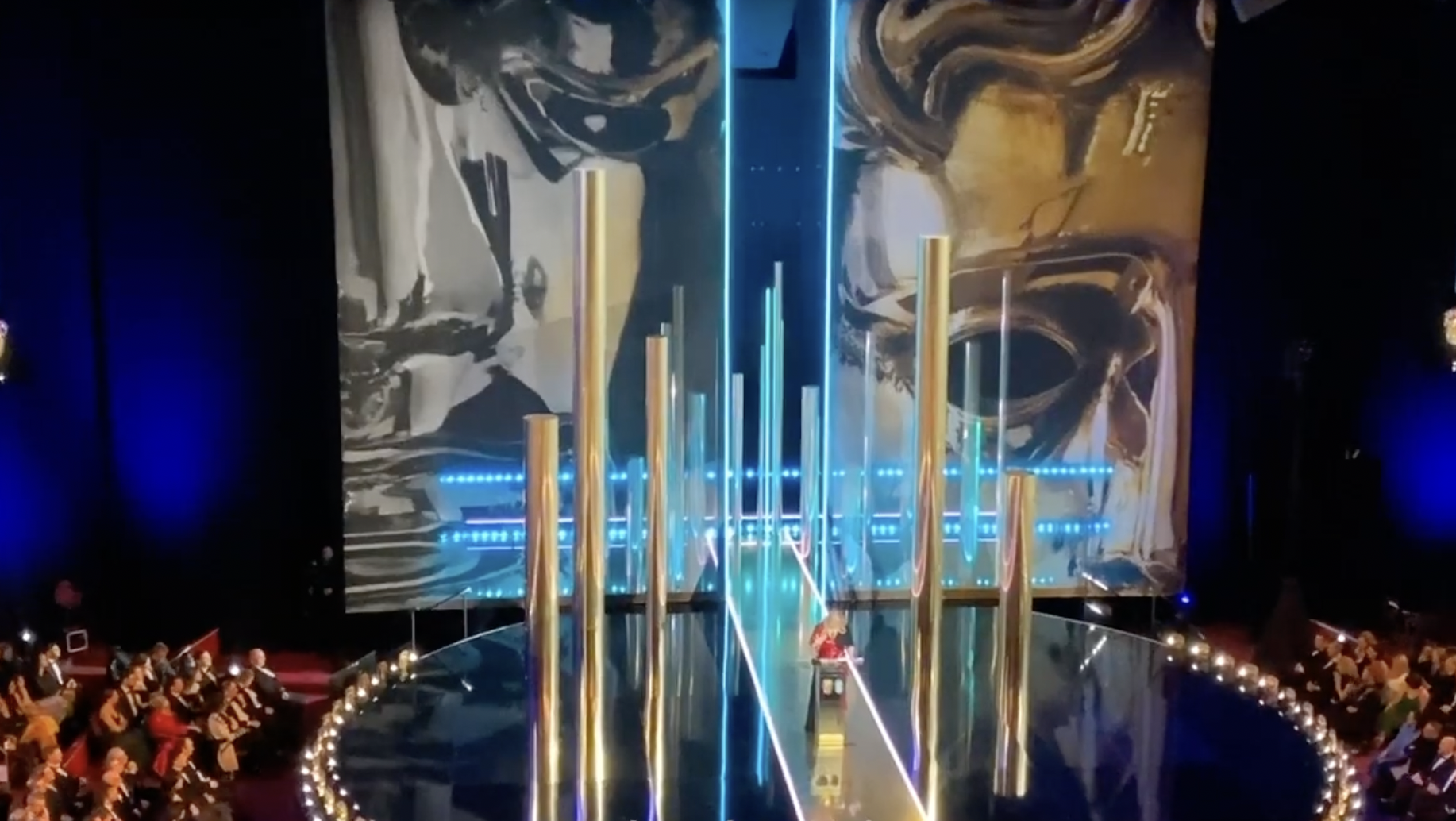
Rebel Wilson presenting at the 73rd British Academy Film Awards in 2020

The ceremony was broadcast on BBC One, BBC One HD and BBC iPlayer at 7:00 p.m on 13 March 2022, the day of the ceremony, and was available to stream exclusively on BritBox in North America and South Africa simultaneously with the UK broadcast. The broadcast was not live with the awards presentation, and some parts were edited out, including host Rebel Wilson ranting about a film production gone awry and cursing the production company. Wilson was selected as host after having presented an award at the previous in-person BAFA ceremony in February 2020; in his live coverage of the 2022 ceremony for The Guardian, British film journalist Stuart Heritage wrote that Wilson had been the only funny part of the 2020 ceremony.

While Heritage enjoyed many parts of Wilson's opening monologue at the 2022 ceremony, including jokes about the demise of the BAF(T)As and her own weight loss, he was unimpressed with her wordplay regarding Tom Hiddleston's "low key" (Loki) appearance at the ceremony; Heritage went on to note throughout the broadcast that Wilson's various skits (including drawing nipples on a flip chart, inviting Andy Serkis to defile a cake shaped like Benedict Cumberbatch, and throwing her bras into the audience) were bad. NME wrote that, while the hosting was troubled, Wilson improved towards the end of the ceremony, particularly her one-liners. Digital Spy, by collecting popular tweets about the ceremony, reported that many viewers were off-put by Wilson's unfunny hosting, though some enjoyed the fact she did not hold back when it came to topical humour. The BBC (which broadcast the ceremony) agreed that Wilson's monologue and one-liners were her strongest points, writing that some of her other jokes fell flat, but they thought "on the whole [she] did a fine job". The Telegraph was instead highly negative of Wilson's hosting and the mismatched tone of the ceremony she created, but praised her ability to "plough on" anyway; it also noted that in coming on after a strong opening song, Wilson was already at a disadvantage.

The de facto theme of the ceremony was "all things Bond". Opening the ceremony, to mark the 60th anniversary of the James Bond franchise, Dame Shirley Bassey, who is connected with the franchise after contributing to the soundtrack of multiple Bond films throughout her career, performed a rendition of the title song from Diamonds Are Forever (1971), the seventh installment of the franchise, with NME praising that her voice was as good as ever, writing: "At 85, her voice remains fully capable of filling the Royal Albert Hall to the rafters." Before the ceremony, it was announced that Bassey would perform an iconic Bond theme, only to be revealed on the night. Also performing live during the ceremony was English actress and singer Emilia Jones, nominated for Best Actress in a Leading Role for her performance in CODA. She performed a rendition of Joni Mitchell's "Both Sides, Now", which her character sings in the film; she was joined by two translators signing the song in American Sign Language (ASL) and British Sign Language (BSL).

Jones' performance was introduced by Wilson, who, while welcoming the interpreters, joked that the sign for "Vladimir Putin" was instead universal, holding up a middle finger to the camera. The same gesture had been made in a different context a week earlier at the 37th Independent Spirit Awards by its hosts, Megan Mullally and Nick Offerman, and presenter Kristen Stewart. Deaf journalist Liam O'Dell wrote that Wilson's version was offensive to sign language users as it reduced their language and accessibility to a punchline. Other political humour included Wilson saying she cut a planned musical number about Prince Andrew called "Pizza Express" and a lengthy but earnest joke Serkis made about the policies of Home Secretary Priti Patel while introducing the award for Best Director. Serious statements regarding the Russian invasion of Ukraine were also made by Wilson, following the In Memoriam montage, and by BAFTA Chair Krishnendu Majumdar in his opening speech, condemning the Russian invasion and reading a message from the Ukrainian Film Academy. For the second year in a row, Prince William, Duke of Cambridge, BAFTA President, did not attend the ceremony, instead delivering a speech via a pre-recorded video that aired during the ceremony.

The acceptance speeches during the ceremony were noted for their excessive length; Heritage found some of them overlong but several of them, instead, moving. He also noted that the speeches could afford to run long because the lack of winners present at the ceremony naturally cut down on speech time; Heritage was more critical towards the nominees for not attending, saying that "they [BAFTA] could have held this ceremony in a minivan for all the people who turned up to collect their awards" and, before the In Memoriam montage, that people featured in it "actually have a good excuse" for not being there. While hosting, Wilson made a poorly-received joke about the personal life of Best Actor in a Leading Role winner Will Smith and, at the response, commented that it was deserved as Smith had not shown up to the ceremony. The high number of absent nominees may be attributed to the ceremony taking place on the same day as the 27th Critics' Choice Awards, which rescheduled their ceremony shortly beforehand and stated that there were no other possible dates, acknowledging the clash and setting up a parallel venue in London (in addition to usual city Los Angeles) to encourage people to attend both ceremonies.

In a series of long speeches, Lady Gaga introduced last year's Rising Star Award winner, Bukky Bakray, so that Bakray could present the award; Lashana Lynch ultimately won. Heritage was also critical of this, explaining his outlook by noting that Lynch had "already risen quite high", playing main characters in major movies, including Captain Marvel (2019) (plus other Marvel Cinematic Universe entries) and the Bond film No Time to Die (2021), and so her career did not need the profile boost of the Rising Star Award. NME was more positive, writing that the award "underlines her rise". Lynch's acceptance speech referred to her family migrating as part of the Windrush generation and how they taught her "about failure, about noes and what noes mean and how to celebrate your yeses", preparing her for the film industry.

Unusually, none of the Best Actress nominees were also nominated in the same category at the 94th Academy Awards. Additionally, of the actresses nominated for the BAFTA, only Lady Gaga had been nominated at the 28th Screen Actors Guild Awards. American film journalist Anne Thompson described Joanna Scanlan's nomination in the category as "bizarre"; Scanlan ultimately won and was surprised herself. In her speech, she thanked BAFTA in Welsh. NME and British film critic Peter Bradshaw wrote that she was a deserving winner. In winning the award for Best Actor in a Supporting Role, CODA actor Troy Kotsur became the first deaf actor to win a BAFA, as well as the first deaf actor to win a BAFTA in a major category and first deaf male actor to win a BAFTA. Bradshaw had worried that Belfast winning Outstanding British Film, and thus being labelled "British", could have been controversial, but was "very pleased" to see it was not significantly so, attributing this to the quality of the film.

Overall, Bradshaw felt that the winners were "well-judged and satisfying". Heritage also noted that the BAFA winners at the ceremony gave little fresh insight to the likely Oscar winners, with a mix of frontrunner and left-field wins.

== Statistics ==
Films that received multiple nominations
Nominations	Film
11	Dune
8	The Power of the Dog (Note: If counting Kodi Smit-McPhee's Rising Star Award nomination, The Power of the Dog would have nine nominations.)
6	Belfast
5	Licorice Pizza
5	No Time to Die (Note: If counting Lashana Lynch's Rising Star Award win, No Time to Die would have six nominations and two wins.)
5	West Side Story (Note: If counting Ariana DeBose's Rising Star Award nomination, West Side Story would have six nominations.)
4	After Love
4	Boiling Point
4	Cyrano
4	Don't Look Up
4	King Richard
4	Passing
3	CODA
3	Drive My Car
3	The French Dispatch
3	House of Gucci
3	Nightmare Alley
2	Ali & Ava
2	Being the Ricardos
2	Cruella
2	Flee
2	The Hand of God
2	Last Night in Soho
2	The Lost Daughter
2	Summer of Soul
2	The Worst Person in the World

Films that received multiple awards
Awards	Film
5	Dune
2	CODA
2	The Power of the Dog
2	West Side Story

== In Memoriam ==
The In Memoriam montage this year was played to the song "Send In the Clowns" by Stephen Sondheim, who was included within the montage.

The following appeared:

- Stephen Sondheim
- Sally Ann Howes
- Jane Powell
- Alan Ladd Jr.
- Lata Mangeshkar
- Roger Michell
- Jean-Paul Belmondo
- Dilip Kumar
- Halyna Hutchins
- Olympia Dukakis
- Monica Vitti
- Richard Donner
- Jean-Marc Vallée
- Ruthie Tompson
- Ivan Reitman
- Douglas Trumbull
- Leslie Bricusse OBE
- Mikis Theodorakis
- Jean-Jacques Beineix
- Lina Wertmüller
- Anthony Powell
- Walter Schneiderman
- Colin Young CBE
- Anthony Smith CBE
- Romaine Hart
- James Higgins
- Jon Gregory
- Richard Conway
- Peter Bogdanovich
- Menelik Shabazz
- Joan Washington
- Sally Kellerman
- Sir Sidney Poitier KBE

== See also ==
- 11th AACTA International Awards
- 94th Academy Awards
- 47th César Awards
- 27th Critics' Choice Awards
- 74th Directors Guild of America Awards
- 35th European Film Awards
- 79th Golden Globe Awards
- 42nd Golden Raspberry Awards
- 36th Goya Awards
- 37th Independent Spirit Awards
- 27th Lumière Awards
- 11th Magritte Awards
- 9th Platino Awards
- 33rd Producers Guild of America Awards
- 26th Satellite Awards
- 47th Saturn Awards
- 28th Screen Actors Guild Awards
- 74th Writers Guild of America Awards
