= British Independent Film Awards 2021 =

Annual film awards

- Date: 5 December 2021
- Most wins: After Love (6)
- Most nominations: Boiling Point (11); Belfast
- Website: www.bifa.film

The British Independent Film Awards 2021 were held on 5 December 2021 to recognise the best in British independent cinema and filmmaking talent from United Kingdom. The nominations were announced on 3 November 2021, by actors Samuel Adewunmi and Mimi Keene via live-stream from the Curzon Soho in London.

The winners of the craft categories were announced on 19 November while the winners for the rest of the categories were presented at the ceremony on 5 December. The awards were hosted by Asim Chaudhry.

== Winners and nominees ==
Best British Independent Film	Best Director
After Love – Aleem Khan, Matthieu de Braconier; Ali & Ava – Clio Barnard, Tracy O'Riordan; Boiling Point – Philip Barantini, James Cummings, Bart Ruspoli, Hester Ruoff; The Nest – Sean Durkin, Ed Guiney, Derrin Schlesinger, Rose Garnett, Amy Jackson, Christina Piovesan; The Souvenir Part II – Joanna Hogg, Ed Guiney, Emma Norton, Andrew Lowe, Luke Schiller	After Love – Aleem Khan; Ali & Ava – Clio Barnard; Boiling Point – Philip Barantini; The Nest – Sean Durkin; The Souvenir Part II – Joanna Hogg
Best Actor	Best Actress
Adeel Akhtar – Ali & Ava as Ali; Riz Ahmed – Encounter as Malik Kahn; Stephen Graham – Boiling Point as Andy Jones; Jude Law – The Nest as Rory O'Hara; James Norton – Nowhere Special as John	Joanna Scanlan – After Love as Mary Hussain; Caitríona Balfe – Belfast as Buddy's mother; Carrie Coon – The Nest as Allison O'Hara; Claire Rushbrook – Ali & Ava as Ava; Ruth Wilson – True Things as Kate
Best Supporting Actor	Best Supporting Actress
Talid Ariss – After Love as Solomon; Richard Ayoade – The Souvenir Part II as Patrick; Lucian River-Chauhan – Encounter as Jay Kahn; Ciarán Hinds – Belfast as Buddy's grandfather; Ray Panthaki – Boiling Point as Freeman	Vinette Robinson – Boiling Point as Carly; Judi Dench – Belfast as Buddy's grandmother; Jo Hartley – Sweetheart as Tina; Nathalie Richard – After Love as Genevieve Longuet; Tilda Swinton – The Souvenir Part II as Rosalind Harte
Breakthrough Performance	Best Screenplay
Nell Barlow – Sweetheart as AJ; Lauryn Ajufo – Boiling Point as Andrea; Max Harwood – Everybody's Talking About Jamie as Jamie New / Mimi Me; Jude Hill – Belfast as Buddy; Ellora Torchia – IN THE EⱯRTH as Alma	After Love – Aleem Khan; Ali & Ava – Clio Barnard; The Nest – Sean Durkin; Benediction – Terence Davis; The Souvenir Part II – Joanna Hogg
Best Documentary	Best Short Film
Poly Styrene: I Am a Cliché – Paul Sng, Celeste Bell, Zoë Howe, Rebecca Mark-Lawson, Matthew Silverman, Daria Mitsche; Cow – Andrea Arnold, Kat Mansoor; Dying to Divorce – Chloe Fairweather, Sinead Kirwan; I Am Belmaya – Sue Carpenter, Christopher Hird; Keyboard Fantasies – Posy Dixon, Liv Proctor	Femme – Sam H Freeman, MG Choon Ping, Sam Ritzenberg, Hayley Williams, Rienjke Attoh; Egúngún (Masquerade) – Olive Nwosu, Alex Polunin; Night of the Living Dead – Ida Melum, Laura Jayne Tunbridge, Hannah Kelso, Danielle Goff; Play It Safe – Mitch Kalisa, Chris Toumazou; Precious Hair & Beauty – John Ognmuyiwa, Sophia Gibber, Tony Longe, Lene Basager
Best International Independent Film	Best Casting
Flee – Jonas Poher Rasmussen, Amin Nawabi, Monica Hellstrøm, Signe Byrge Sørensen; Compartment No. 6 – Juho Kuosmanen, Livia Ulvan, Andris Feldmanis, Jussi Rantamäki, Emilia Hakka; First Cow – Kelly Reichardt, Jon Raymond, Neil Kopp, Vincent Savino, Anish Savjani; Petite Maman – Céline Sciamma, Bénédicte Couvreur; Pleasure – Ninja Thyberg, Peter Modestij, Eliza Jones, Markus Waltå, Erik Hemmendorff	Boiling Point – Carolyn McLeod; After Love – Shaheen Baig; Ali & Ava – Shaheen Baig; Pirates – Shaheen Baig; Belfast – Lucy Bevan, Emily Brockmann
Cinematography	Best Costume Design
Boiling Point – Matthew Lewis; The Nest – Mátyás Erdély; Cow – Magda Kowalczyk; Censor – Annika Summerson; Belfast – Haris Zambarloukos	The Souvenir Part II – Grace Snell; The Electrical Life of Louis Wain – Michael O'Connor; Everybody's Talking About Jamie – Guy Speranza; Benediction – Annie Symons; Belfast – Charlotte Walter
Best Editing	Best Effects
The Souvenir Part II – Helle le Fevre; Cow – Rebecca Lloyd, Jacob Schulsinger, Nicolas Chaudeurge; Belfast – Úna Ní Dhonghaíle; Censor – Mark Towns; IN THE EⱯRTH – Ben Wheatley	DASHCAM – Steven Bray, Mike Knights; Censor – Gary Brown, István Molnár, Dan Martin; The Electrical Life of Louis Wain – Rupert Davies
Best Make-Up & Hair Design	Best Music
The Electrical Life of Louis Wain – Vickie Lang, Kristyan Mallett, Donald McInnes; The Souvenir Part II – Siobhan Harper-Ryan; Censor – Ruth Pease; Everybody's Talking About Jamie – Nadia Stacey; Belfast – Wakana Yoshihara	Ali & Ava – Connie Farr, Harry Escott; Pirates – Iain Cooke; Encounter – Jed Kurzel; IN THE EⱯRTH – Clint Mansell; Belfast – Van Morrison
Best Production Design	Best Sound
The Souvenir Part II – Stéphane Collonge; Boiling Point – Aimee Meek; Belfast – Jim Clay; The Electrical Life of Louis Wain – Suzie Davies; Censor – Paulina Rzeszowska	Boiling Point – James Drake, Rob Entwistle and Kiff McManus; Cow – Nicolas Becker, Cyril Holtz, Linda Forsen; Censor – Tim Harrison, Jamie Roden, Adele Fletcher; IN THE EⱯRTH – Martin Pavey; Encounter – Andrew Stirk, Paul Davies, Morgan Muse, Bernard O'Reilley, Julian Howarth
Douglas Hickox Award (Best Debut Director)	Best Debut Screenwriter
After Love – Aleem Khan; Censor – Prano Bailey-Bond; Wildfire – Cathy Brady; Poly Styrene: I Am a Cliché – Celeste Bell; Sweetheart – Marley Morrison	Wildfire – Cathy Brady; Censor – Prano Bailey-Bond; After Love – Aleem Khan; Sweetheart – Marley Morrison; Pirates – Reggie Yates
Breakthrough Producer	The Raindance Discovery Award
Sweetheart – Michele Antoniades; Censor – Helen Jones; She Will – Jessica Malik; Boiling Point – Hester Ruoff; The Power – Rob Watson	Poly Styrene: I Am a Cliché – Paul Sng, Celeste Bell, Zoë Howe, Rebecca Mark-Lawson, Matthew Silverman, Daria Mitsche; Bank Job – Daniel Edelsty, Hilary Powell, Christopher Hird; The Bike Thief – Matt Chambers, PK Fellowes, Sophia Gibber, Lene Bausager; I Am Belmaya – Sue Carpenter, Christopher Hird; Rebel Dykes – Harri Shanahan, Sian A. Williams, Siobhan Fahey

=== Films with multiple nominations and awards ===
Films that received multiple nominations
Nominations	Film
11	Boiling Point
11	Belfast
9	The Souvenir Part II
9	Censor
9	After Love
7	Ali & Ava
6	The Nest
5	Sweetheart
4	Cow
4	Encounter
4	IN THE EⱯRTH
4	The Electrical Life of Louis Wain
3	Everybody's Talking About Jamie
3	Poly Styrene: I Am a Cliché
3	Pirates
2	Benediction
2	I Am Belmaya
2	Wildfire

Films that received multiple awards
Awards	Film
6	After Love
4	Boiling Point
3	The Souvenir Part II
2	Ali & Ava
2	Poly Styrene: I Am a Cliché
2	Sweetheart
