= Zoë Howe =

English Writer (born 1979)

- Born: October 1979 (age 46)
- Years active: 2006–present
- Spouse: Dylan Howe (m. 2006)
- Father: Sean Street

Zoë Janine Howe (born October 1979) is an English writer, editor, broadcaster, musician and artist. She is best known for her rock music biographies. She is a Royal Literary Fund (RLF) Fellow and a contributor to the Oxford Dictionary of National Biography.

== Personal life ==
Zoë is the daughter of Anglo-Irish poet and broadcaster Seán Street and actor / director Joanne Dynan. Zoë married drummer Dylan Howe in 2006.

== Career ==
=== Writing and biographical work ===
After "[waiting] for ages for someone to write a book about The Slits", Howe started writing one herself in 2006. Howe's work initially focused on the album Cut (1979) in light of its forthcoming 30th anniversary, but it turned into a full biography. For the book, Howe conducted a number of interviews, including with all four of the band's original members. Typical Girls? The Story of the Slits was published in 2009 via Omnibus Press.

Howe's second book How's Your Dad? Living in the Shadow of a Rock Star Parent followed the next year, interrogating the lives of the children of rock musicians. She co-authored Wilko Johnson's 2012 autobiography Looking Back at Me, was commissioned by her publisher to write Florence + the Machine: An Almighty Sound, and contributed to JC Wheatley's The British Beat Explosion: Rock 'n' Roll Island.

In 2014, Howe published The Jesus and Mary Chain: Barbed Wire Kisses and Stevie Nicks: Visions, Dreams & Rumours. She then penned Lee Brilleaux: Rock 'n' Roll Gentleman.

Howe published her debut fiction novel Shine On, Marquee Moon in 2016. Shine On, Marquee Moon was shortlisted for the 2016 Virginia Prize for Fiction.

Returning to biographical work, Howe co-wrote Dayglo: The Poly Styrene Story (2018) with the titular Poly Styrene's daughter Celeste Bell. The pair then collaborated with filmmaker Paul Sng on the 2021 documentary Poly Styrene: I Am a Cliché. The documentary won Best Documentary and the Maverick Prize at the British Independent Film Awards.

From 2020 to 2022 through the Royal Literary Fund (RLF), Howe was a Fellow of Newnham College, Cambridge. She is currently a Royal Literary Fund NHS Trust Fellow in Residence at University College London Hospital in collaboration with Laura Beatty. Howe contributed to 50 Women in the Blues.

In 2022, Howe co-authored The Jam 1982 with Rick Buckler and began writing witch-related books, starting with Witchful Thinking: The Wise Woman's Handbook for Creating a Charmed Life via Llewellyn Worldwide.

=== Other work ===
From 2012, Howe started displaying her own artwork and worked on exhibitions. Howe is a member of the Thames Group of Artists. In terms of her radio work, in addition to appearing on Absolute Radio music documentaries, Howe created the music/psychogeography-focused Resonance FM series City by City in 2010. She later started hosting shows, including The Witching Hour (later Rock 'n' Roll Witch), on Soho Radio. Her other work for the station includes Gary Crowley's punk and new wave show and The Other Woman on the station. She is occasionally a guest on BBC 5 Live.

Musically, Howe has played drums and percussion since she was 12, training with BBC Big Band drummer Paul Brodie. She has played over the years with Viv Albertine, Steve Beresford, Mick Jones and Anne Pigalle. She appeared as Kelly Osbourne's drummer in Paul Weiland's 2003 Doritos advert and she provided backing vocals on SheBeat's 2025 album From Liverpool To Leith. Howe was part of the Southend music scene, playing with groups including Wobbly Lamps, Platypus, The Voronas and The Plan, and presenting shows on the local independent radio station Ship Full Of Bombs.

Zoë has been working with the wildlife presenter and conservationist Ajay Tegala on a project titled 'Witching the Wild Year'; the project began as a live show appearing at theatres and art centres, celebrating the turn of the wheel of the year with explorations into botany, folklore and conservation. The pair are currently developing the show into a book, to be published by The History Press in 2027.

== Bibliography ==
=== Non-fiction ===
- Typical Girls? The Story of the Slits (2009)
- How's Your Dad?: Living in the Shadow of a Rock Star Parent (2010)
- Looking Back at Me (2012) (co-written with Wilko Johnson)
- Florence + the Machine: An Almighty Sound (2012)
- The Jesus and Mary Chain: Barbed Wire Kisses (2014)
- Stevie Nicks: Visions, Dreams & Rumours (2014)
- Lee Brilleaux: Rock'n'Roll Gentleman (2015)
- Dayglo: The Poly Styrene Story (2018) (with Celeste Bell)
- The Jam 1982 (2022) (with Rick Buckler)

=== Novels ===
- Shine On, Marquee Moon (2016)

=== Other ===
- Witchful Thinking: The Wise Woman's Handbook for Creating a Charmed Life (2022)
- Scorpio Witch: Unlock the Magic of Your Sun Sign (2023) (with Ivo Dominguez)

=== Contributions ===
- The British Beat Explosion: Rock 'n' Roll Island (2013) (edited by JC Wheatley)
- 50 Women in the Blues (2020)
- The Art of Punk (2022)

=== Editing ===
- Life's A Gamble, memoir by Pauline Murray (Omnibus Press, 2023)
- A Continual Farewell: My Life in Letters with Tony Wilson, by Lindsay Reade (Omnibus Press, 2024)
- Rebel Grrrlz: The Real Story of Women and Punk, by Molly Tie (Omnibus Press, 2025)

== Filmography ==
- Poly Styrene: I Am a Cliché (2021)
