= Sweetheart (2021 film) =

- Poster
- Directed by: Marley Morrison
- Written by: Marley Morrison
- Produced by: Michelle Antoniades
- Starring: Nell Barlow; Jo Hartley; Ella-Rae Smith; Sophia Di Martino; Samuel Anderson; Tabitha Byron
- Cinematography: Emily Almond Barr; Matthew Wicks
- Edited by: Keelan Gumbley
- Music by: Toydrum
- Production companies: Hazey Jane Films; Bohemia Film; SUMS Film and Media; Film London
- Distributed by: Peccadillo Films
- Release date: 3 March 2021 (Glasgow)
- Running time: 94 minutes
- Country: United Kingdom
- Language: English

Sweetheart is a British coming-of-age film written and directed by Marley Morrison in her feature film debut. It premiered at the 2021 Glasgow Film Festival, where it won the Audience Award. Distributed by Peccadillo Films, the film had a theatrical release on 24 September 2021.

== Synopsis ==
A socially awkward lesbian teenager falls in love for the first time while vacationing at a British holiday park.

== Cast ==
- Nell Barlow as AJ
- Jo Hartley as Tina
- Ella-Rae Smith as Isla
- Sophia Di Martino as Lucy
- Samuel Anderson as Steve
- Tabitha Byron as Dana

== Production ==
Principal photography took place in 2019, wrapping that October. The project received support from Film London's Microwave scheme.

== Reception ==
=== Critical response ===
Rotten Tomatoes reported an approval rating of 100% based on 19 reviews, with an average rating of 7.3/10.

=== Awards and nominations ===
Year	Award	Category	Nominee	Result	Ref.
2021	Glasgow Film Festival	Audience Award	Sweetheart	Won	
2021	Inside Out Film and Video Festival	Best First Feature	Sweetheart	Won	
2021	Frameline Film Festival	Best First Film	Marley Morrison	Nominated	
2021	Outfest	Outstanding Performance in an International Narrative	Nell Barlow	Won	
2021	Merlinka Festival	Best Feature Film	Sweetheart	Nominated	
2021	British Independent Film Awards	Best Supporting Actress	Jo Hartley	Nominated	
2021	British Independent Film Awards	Breakthrough Performance	Nell Barlow	Won	
2021	British Independent Film Awards	Douglas Hickox Award	Marley Morrison	Nominated	
2021	British Independent Film Awards	Best Debut Screenwriter	Marley Morrison	Nominated	
2021	British Independent Film Awards	Breakthrough Producer	Michelle Antoniades	Won	
2022	London Film Critics Circle Awards	Breakthrough British/Irish Filmmaker of the Year	Marley Morrison	Nominated	
