= British Independent Film Award – The Douglas Hickox Award =

Film award

- Awarded for: Best Debut Director
- Country: United Kingdom
- Presented by: BIFA
- First award: 1998
- Currently held by: Christopher Andrews for Bring Them Down (2024)
- Website: www.bifa.org.uk

The Douglas Hickox Award, also named The Douglas Hickox Award (Best Debut Director) is an annual award given by the British Independent Film Awards (BIFA) to recognize the best British debut director. The name of the awards is in honour of British film and television director Douglas Hickox for his commitment and support for new talent. The award was first presented in the 1998 ceremony.

In regards to the category, BIFA states that is "for a British director for their debut fiction feature film. Previous television or documentary credits do not disqualify an individual from consideration. Documentaries are ineligible in this category unless an exception is granted by BIFA’s Nomination Committee".

== Winners and nominees ==
=== 1990s ===
Year	Director(s)	Film
1998 (1st)	Shane Meadows	Twenty Four Seven
1998 (1st)	Geneviève Jolliffe	Urban Ghost Story
1998 (1st)	Peter Mullan	Orphans
1998 (1st)	Andrew Piddington	The Fall
1998 (1st)	Guy Ritchie	Lock, Stock and Two Smoking Barrels
1999 (2nd)	Lynne Ramsay	Ratcatcher
1999 (2nd)	Jasmin Dizdar	Beautiful People
1999 (2nd)	Justin Kerrigan	Human Traffic
1999 (2nd)	Clare Kilner	Janice Beard 45WPM
1999 (2nd)	Damien O'Donnell	East Is East

=== 2000s ===
Year	Director(s)	Film
2000 (3rd)	Kevin Macdonald	One Day in September
2000 (3rd)	Jim Doyle	Going Off Big Time
2000 (3rd)	Ben Hopkins	Simon Magus
2000 (3rd)	Julian Nott	Weak at Denise
2000 (3rd)	Jamie Thraves	The Low Down
2001 (4th)	Asif Kapadia	The Warrior
2001 (4th)	Joel Hopkins	Jump Tomorrow
2001 (4th)	Saul Metzstein	Late Night Shopping
2001 (4th)	Richard Parry	South West 9
2002 (5th)	Christian Taylor and Lindy Heymann	Showboy
2002 (5th)	Duncan Roy	AKA
2002 (5th)	Paul Sarossy	Mr In-Between
2002 (5th)	Kirsten Sheridan	Disco Pigs
2003 (6th)	Richard Jobson	16 Years of Alcohol
2003 (6th)	Stephen Fry	Bright Young Things
2003 (6th)	Sarah Gavron	This Little Life
2003 (6th)	Jeremy Wooding	Bollywood Queen
2003 (6th)	Penny Woolcock	The Principles of Lust
2004 (7th)	John Crowley	Intermission
2004 (7th)	Saul Dibb	Bullet Boy
2004 (7th)	Matthew Vaughn	Layer Cake
2004 (7th)	Peter Webber	Girl with a Pearl Earring
2004 (7th)	Emily Young	Kiss of Life
2005 (8th)	Annie Griffin	Festival
2005 (8th)	Gaby Dellal	On a Clear Day
2005 (8th)	Laurence Dunmore	The Libertine
2005 (8th)	Richard E. Grant	Wah-Wah
2005 (8th)	Julian Jarrold	Kinky Boots
2006 (9th)	Menhaj Huda	Kidulthood
2006 (9th)	Andrea Arnold	Red Road
2006 (9th)	Caradog W. James	Little White Lies
2006 (9th)	Tom Vaughan	Starter for 10
2006 (9th)	Paul Andrew Williams	London to Brighton
2007 (10th)	Anton Corbijn	Control
2007 (10th)	Marc Francis and Nick Francis	Black Gold
2007 (10th)	Oliver Hodge	Garbage Warrior
2007 (10th)	Steve Hudson	True North
2007 (10th)	David Schwimmer	Run Fatboy Run
2008 (11th)	Steve McQueen	Hunger
2008 (11th)	Eran Creevy	Shifty
2008 (11th)	Martin McDonagh	In Bruges
2008 (11th)	James Watkins	Eden Lake
2008 (11th)	Rupert Wyatt	The Escapist
2009 (12th)	Duncan Jones	Moon
2009 (12th)	Armando Iannucci	In the Loop
2009 (12th)	Samantha Morton	The Unloved
2009 (12th)	Peter Strickland	Katalin Varga
2009 (12th)	Sam Taylor-Wood	Nowhere Boy

=== 2010s ===
Year	Director(s)	Film
2010 (13th)	Clio Barnard	The Arbor
2010 (13th)	Gareth Edwards	Monsters
2010 (13th)	Rowan Joffé	Brighton Rock
2010 (13th)	Chris Morris	Four Lions
2010 (13th)	Debs Paterson	Africa United
2011 (14th)	Paddy Considine	Tyrannosaur
2011 (14th)	Richard Ayoade	Submarine
2011 (14th)	Joe Cornish	Attack the Block
2011 (14th)	Ralph Fiennes	Coriolanus
2011 (14th)	John Michael McDonagh	The Guard
2012 (15th)	Bart Layton	The Imposter
2012 (15th)	Rowan Athale	Wasteland
2012 (15th)	Ben Drew	Ill Manors
2012 (15th)	Sally El Hosaini	My Brother the Devil
2012 (15th)	Rufus Norris	Broken
2013 (16th)	Paul Wright	For Those in Peril
2013 (16th)	Charlie Cattrall	Titus
2013 (16th)	Tina Gharavi	I Am Nasrine
2013 (16th)	Jeremy Lovering	In Fear
2013 (16th)	Omid Nooshin	Last Passenger
2014 (17th)	Iain Forsyth and Jane Pollard	20,000 Days on Earth
2014 (17th)	Yann Demange	'71
2014 (17th)	Hong Khaou	Lilting
2014 (17th)	Morgan Matthews	X+Y
2014 (17th)	Daniel Wolfe and Matthew Wolfe	Catch Me Daddy
2015 (18th)	Stephen Fingleton	The Survivalist
2015 (18th)	Ben Blaine and Chris Blanie	Nina Forever
2015 (18th)	Corin Hardy	The Hallow
2015 (18th)	Paul Katis	Kajaki: The True Story
2015 (18th)	John Maclean	Slow West
2016 (19th)	Babak Anvari	Under the Shadow
2016 (19th)	Alice Lowe	Prevenge
2016 (19th)	Pete Middleton and James Spinney	Notes on Blindness
2016 (19th)	Adam Smith	Trespass Against Us
2016 (19th)	Rachel Tunnard	Adult Life Skills
2017 (20th)	Rungano Nyoni	I Am Not a Witch
2017 (20th)	Deborah Haywood	Pin Cushion
2017 (20th)	Francis Lee	God's Own Country
2017 (20th)	Thomas Napper	Jawbone
2017 (20th)	William Oldroyd	Lady Macbeth
2018 (21st)	Richard Billingham	Ray & Liz
2018 (21st)	Daniel Kokotajlo (director)	Apostasy
2018 (21st)	Matt Palmer	Calibre
2018 (21st)	Michael Pearce	Beast
2018 (21st)	Leanne Welham	Pili
2019 (22nd)	Harry Wootliff	Only You
2019 (22nd)	Fyzal Boulifa	Lynn + Lucy
2019 (22nd)	Ninian Doff	Boyz in the Wood
2019 (22nd)	Chiwetel Ejiofor	The Boy Who Harnessed the Wind
2019 (22nd)	Richard Phelan and Will Becher	A Shaun the Sheep Movie: Farmageddon

=== 2020s ===
Year	Director(s)	Film
2020 (23rd)	Rose Glass	Saint Maud
2020 (23rd)	Henry Blake	County Lines
2020 (23rd)	Eva Riley	Perfect 10
2020 (23rd)	Nick Rowland	Calm with Horses
2020 (23rd)	Remi Weekes	His House
2021 (24th)	Aleem Khan	After Love
2021 (24th)	Prano Bailey-Bond	Censor
2021 (24th)	Celeste Bell	Poly Styrene: I Am a Cliché
2021 (24th)	Cathy Brady	Wildfire
2021 (24th)	Marley Morrison	Sweetheart
2022 (25th)	Charlotte Wells	Aftersun
2022 (25th)	Andrew Cumming	The Origin
2022 (25th)	Thomas Hardiman	Medusa Deluxe
2022 (25th)	Georgia Oakley	Blue Jean
2022 (25th)	Frances O'Connor	Emily
2023 (26th)	Savanah Leaf	Earth Mama
2023 (26th)	Raine Allen-Miller	Rye Lane
2023 (26th)	Sam H. Freeman and Ng Choon Ping	Femme
2023 (26th)	Molly Manning Walker	How to Have Sex
2023 (26th)	Charlotte Regan	Scrapper
2024 (27th)	Christopher Andrews	Bring Them Down
2024 (27th)	Luna Carmoon	Hoard
2024 (27th)	James Krishna Floyd	Unicorns (Note: Also directed by Sally El Hosaini.)
2024 (27th)	Karan Kandhari	Sister Midnight
2024 (27th)	Rich Peppiatt	Kneecap
2025 (28th)	Laura Carreira	On Falling
2025 (28th)	Akinola Davies Jr.	My Father's Shadow
2025 (28th)	Harris Dickinson	Urchin
2025 (28th)	Harry Lighton	Pillion
2025 (28th)	Cal McMau	Wasteman

== See also ==
- BAFTA Award for Outstanding Debut by a British Writer, Director or Producer
