= British Independent Film Award for Best Editing =

- Awarded for: Best Editing
- Country: United Kingdom
- Presented by: BIFA
- First award: 2017
- Currently held by: Kneecap – Julian Ulrichs and Chris Gill (2024)
- Website: www.bifa.org.uk

The British Independent Film Award for Best Editing is an annual award given by the British Independent Film Awards (BIFA) to recognize the best editing in a British independent film. The award was first presented in the 2017 ceremony.

Prior to 2017, editing was included in the category Best Technical Achievement alongside different areas of crafts in film, this category was presented from 2001 to 2016.

== Winners and nominees ==
=== 2010s ===
Year	Film	Recipient(s)
2017 (20th)	Three Billboards Outside Ebbing, Missouri	Jon Gregory
2017 (20th)	The Death of Stalin	Peter Lambert
2017 (20th)	Jawbone	David Charap
2017 (20th)	Us and Them	Joe Martin
2017 (20th)	Williams	Johnny Burke
2018 (21st)	American Animals	Nick Fenton, Chris Gill and Julian Hart
2018 (21st)	The Favourite	Yorgos Mavropsaridis
2018 (21st)	Happy New Year, Colin Burstead	Ben Wheatley
2018 (21st)	A Prayer Before Dawn	Marc Boucrot
2018 (21st)	You Were Never Really Here	Joe Bini
2019 (22nd)	For Sama	Chloe Lambourne and Simon McMahon
2019 (22nd)	Bait	Mark Jenkin
2019 (22nd)	Diego Maradona	Chris King
2019 (22nd)	The Personal History of David Copperfield	Mick Audsley and Peter Lambert
2019 (22nd)	The Souvenir	Helle Le Fevre

=== 2020s ===
Year	Film	Recipient(s)
2020 (23rd)	The Father	Yorgos Lamprinos
2020 (23rd)	His House	Julia Bloch
2020 (23rd)	Host	Brenna Rangott
2020 (23rd)	Rocks	Maya Maffioli
2020 (23rd)	Saint Maud	Mark Towns
2021 (24th)	The Souvenir Part II	Helle le Fevre
2021 (24th)	Belfast	Úna Ní Dhonghaíle
2021 (24th)	Censor	Mark Towns
2021 (24th)	Cow	Rebecca Lloyd, Jacob Schulsinger and Nicolas Chaudeurge
2021 (24th)	IN THE EⱯRTH	Ben Wheatley
2022 (25th)	Aftersun	Blair McClendon
2022 (25th)	Blue Jean	Izabella Curry
2022 (25th)	Elizabeth: A Portrait in Parts	Joanna Crickmay
2022 (25th)	Flux Gourmet	Mátyás Fekete
2022 (25th)	Nothing Compares	Mich Mahon
2023 (26th)	All of Us Strangers	Jonathan Alberts
2023 (26th)	Bobi Wine: The People's President	Paul Carlin
2023 (26th)	The End We Start From	Arttu Salmi
2023 (26th)	High & Low – John Galliamo	Avdhesh Mohla
2023 (26th)	Rye Lane	Victoria Boydell
2024 (27th)	Kneecap	Julian Ulrichs and Chris Gill
2024 (27th)	Bird	Joe Bini
2024 (27th)	Civil War	Jake Roberts
2024 (27th)	Made in England: The Films of Powell and Pressburger	Margarida Cartaxo and Stuart Davidson
2024 (27th)	The Outrun	Stephen Bechinger
