= Aleem Khan (director) =

British film maker

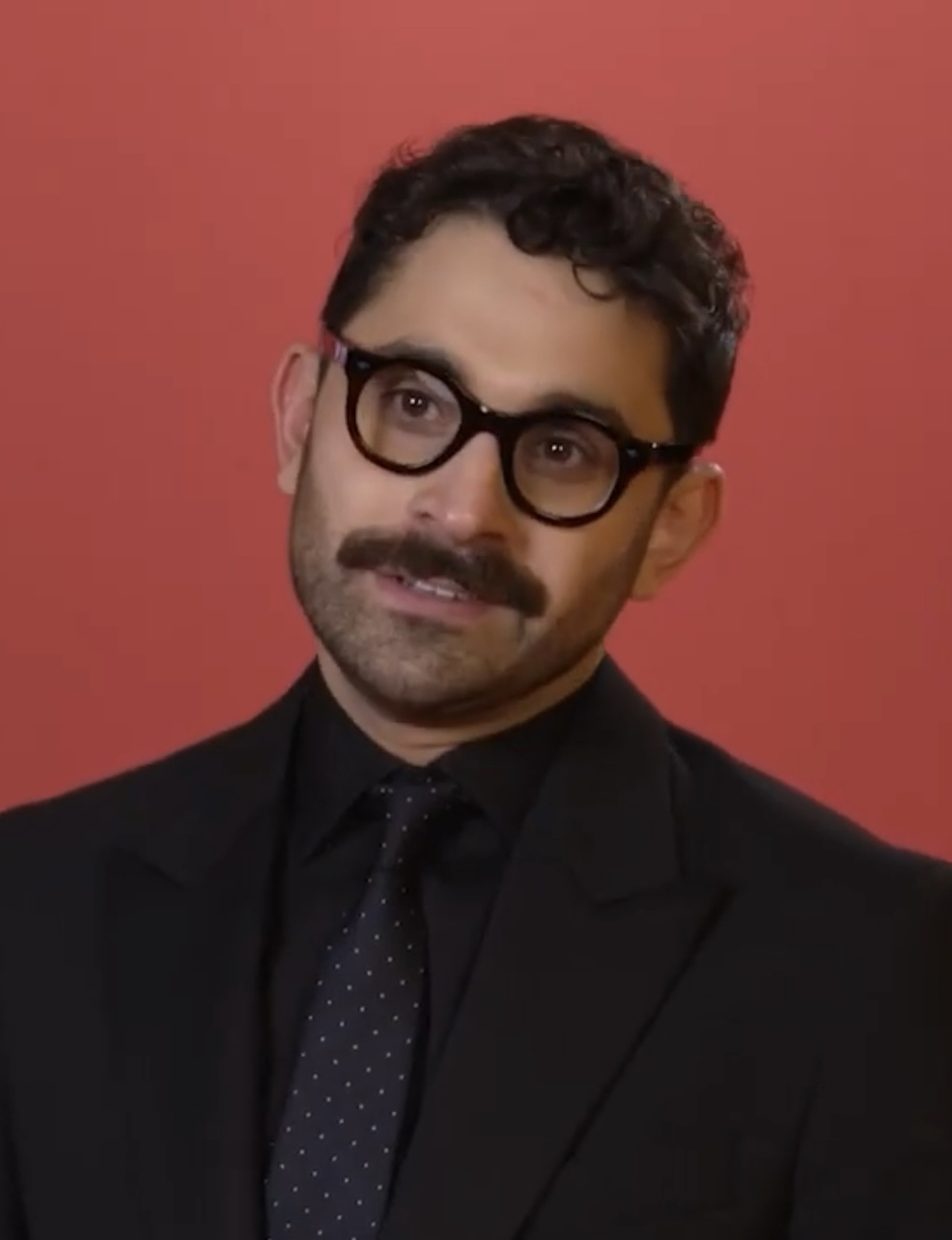
- Khan at the British Independent Film Awards 2021
- Born: 19 May 1985 (age 40); Chatham, Kent
- Occupations: Film director; screenwriter; producer
- Years active: 2007–present

Aleem Khan (born 19 May 1985) is a British film director and screenwriter. He is known for the film After Love (2020), which garnered accolades from international film festivals, including six British Independent Film Awards and one BAFTA.

== Early life and education ==
Khan was born on 19 May 1985 in Chatham, Kent, to an English mother and a Pakistani father. His parents met as teenagers on the London housing estate where they both lived, and Khan was born after they married and moved to the Kent coast.

He became interested in filmmaking through observing his father's passion for documenting the family on his VHS camcorder. As an undergraduate film student at the University of Westminster, Khan directed and performed in several plays and served as president of the university drama society before graduating in 2006.

== Career ==
Khan received his first British Academy Film Awards (BAFTA) nomination in 2015 in the Best Short Film category for his film Three Brothers, about a teenage boy caring for his young siblings after their father abandons them and returns to Pakistan in order to remarry.

Khan made his feature-length debut in 2020 with After Love, a fictional drama about an ageing English Muslim convert who discovers that her recently deceased husband has a secret family living in Calais. After Love was selected for the 2020 Cannes Film Festival as part of the Critics' Week selection. Khan has stated that Mary, the films central protagonist, was modelled on his mother, who herself had converted after getting married.

At the 2021 British Independent Film Awards, After Love won six awards, including Best British Independent Film, Best Director, Best Screenplay and Best Debut Director for Khan. The film was also nominated for four BAFTA awards, including Best Director, Outstanding British Debut and Outstanding British Film for Khan, with a win in the Leading Actress category for Joanna Scanlan.
