= After Love (2020 film) =

2020 film directed by Aleem Khan

- Poster
- Directed by: Aleem Khan
- Written by: Aleem Khan
- Produced by: Matthieu de Braconier; Gabrielle Dumon
- Starring: Joanna Scanlan
- Cinematography: Alexander Dynan
- Edited by: Gareth C. Scales
- Music by: Chris Roe
- Production companies: British Film Institute; BBC Film; The Bureau
- Distributed by: BFI Distribution (United Kingdom and Ireland); Rezo Films (France)
- Release dates: 11 September 2020 (Toronto); 4 June 2021 (United Kingdom)
- Running time: 89 minutes
- Countries: United Kingdom; France
- Languages: English; Arabic; French; Urdu

After Love is a 2020 British drama film written and directed by Aleem Khan in his feature-length directorial debut. The film stars Joanna Scanlan as widow Mary Hussain discovering her husband's secret family after he dies unexpectedly.

The film received its world premiere at the 2020 Toronto International Film Festival and had a theatrical release in the United Kingdom on 4 June 2021. The film received positive reviews from critics, with praise for Khan's direction and Scanlan's performance. Both were nominated at the 75th BAFTA awards, with Scanlan winning for best actress.

== Plot ==
Mary Hussain (Joanna Scanlan) and her husband Ahmed (Nasser Memarzia) return home one night only for Ahmed to die unexpectedly. After looking through Ahmed's wallet some time after his funeral, she notices a picture of a woman named Genevieve (Nathalie Richard) whom she has never heard of before. Probing further, she looks at Ahmed's phone and sees multiple text messages he sent to the same woman, with the two of them suggestively discussing meeting up with each other.

Suspicious, Mary takes a ferry across the English Channel to Calais to find Genevieve. After meeting her, Genevieve mistakes Mary for a cleaning lady and invites her inside for work. Genevieve lives with her son Solomon (Talid Ariss), with whom she appears to be on uneasy terms, and both of them plan to move away in a few days. They're both unaware that Ahmed has died. Mary hides her true identity and poses as a cleaner so she can learn more information. While at her house, she notices multiple articles of Ahmed's clothing. After walking in on a home movie tape with Genevieve, Ahmed, and Solomon, Mary realizes Genevieve and Solomon were Ahmed's secret family for many years.

One day, Mary sneaks into Genevieve's house to search for more information when Solomon suddenly arrives and sneaks another boy into his room. Mary looks into their room and sees them passionately kissing each other. While leaving, Solomon hears her and catches up to her outside. Mary tells Solomon she was in their house to get her bag and that she won't tell Genevieve what Solomon did. The next day, Mary explains to Solomon that she and Ahmed used to keep their relationship a secret as well when they were younger. At first, they sent letters back and forth, but when Ahmed moved to Pakistan, he sent cassette tapes to Mary.

Later, Mary witnesses an argument between Genevieve and Solomon. Solomon accuses his mother of cheating on Ahmed with several other men and refuses to move away with her as he wants to live with Ahmed instead. When Mary confronts Genevieve about their argument, Genevieve says she was aware that Ahmed had another wife throughout the time she knew him, but continued to see Ahmed anyway. She also learns that Ahmed lied about her as he said Mary was Pakistani and that they never had a child (Ahmed and Mary had a son many years ago who died at four months old). Later, Mary poses as Ahmed and texts Solomon from his phone, where Solomon asks if he can move in with him.

As Genevieve prepares to move away, Mary makes some food for Solomon. When Genevieve walks in, she and Solomon get into another heated argument, culminating with Mary slapping Solomon and Genevieve scolding Mary for hitting him. Later, Mary admits to Genevieve that she's Ahmed's wife and she came to their house to get information. Furious, Genevieve demands to know where Ahmed is. After Solomon walks in the room, Mary says that Ahmed died. Solomon tries to call Ahmed, only for his phone to ring in Mary's handbag, confirming that Mary posed as Ahmed. Genevieve then throws Mary out of her house.

Later, Genevieve, Solomon, and Mary happen to visit Ahmed's grave at the same time (and, in turn, Ahmed's and Mary's son's grave, who's buried next to his father). The three of them then return to Mary's house. Genevieve tells Mary that she was always jealous that Ahmed wouldn't ever leave Mary for her, but was fine with sharing as she believed she had the better half of Ahmed. Shortly after Genevieve leaves the room, Mary hears one of the cassette tapes that Ahmed made for her and walks downstairs to see Genevieve and Solomon listening to it. Solomon initially gives the tape to Mary, but she allows him to keep it instead. The two tearfully embrace. In the final scene, the three of them visit the White Cliffs of Dover and look out at the English Channel.

== Cast ==
- Joanna Scanlan as Mary Hussain
- Nathalie Richard as Genevieve
- Talid Ariss as Solomon
- Nasser Memarzia as Ahmed
- Sudha Bhuchar as Farzanna
- Nisha Chadha as Mina

== Release ==
The film had its premiere at the 2020 Toronto International Film Festival during the Industry Selects program, a film market programme for films seeking commercial distribution. Throughout 2020, After Love was screened at BFI London Film Festival, Rome Film Festival, and Tokyo International Film Festival. The film was theatrically released in the United Kingdom on 4 June 2021.

== Reception ==
=== Critical reception ===
On the review aggregator website Rotten Tomatoes, the film holds an approval rating of 93% based on 46 reviews, with an average rating of 7.9/10. The website's consensus reads, "After Love marks an impressively nuanced feature debut for writer-director Aleem Khan -- and a brilliant showcase for Joanna Scanlan's dramatic chops." On Metacritic, the film has a weighted average score of 81 out of 100, based on 14 critics, indicating "universal acclaim".

=== Accolades ===
Award	Date of ceremony	Category	Recipients and nominees	Result	Ref.
British Independent Film Awards	5 December 2021	Best British Independent Film	Aleem Khan and Matthieu de Braconier	Won	
British Independent Film Awards	5 December 2021	Best Director	Aleem Khan	Won	
British Independent Film Awards	5 December 2021	Best Actress	Joanna Scanlan	Won	
British Independent Film Awards	5 December 2021	Best Supporting Actor	Talid Ariss	Won	
British Independent Film Awards	5 December 2021	Best Supporting Actress	Nathalie Richard	Nominated	
British Independent Film Awards	5 December 2021	Best Screenplay	Aleem Khan	Won	
British Independent Film Awards	5 December 2021	Best Casting	Shaheen Baig	Nominated	
British Independent Film Awards	5 December 2021	Douglas Hickox Award (Best Debut Director)	Aleem Khan	Won	
British Independent Film Awards	5 December 2021	Best Debut Screenwriter	Aleem Khan	Nominated	
British Academy Film Awards	13 March 2022	Best Director	Aleem Khan	Nominated	
British Academy Film Awards	13 March 2022	Best Actress	Joanna Scanlan	Won	
British Academy Film Awards	13 March 2022	Outstanding British Film	Aleem Khan and Matthieu de Braconier	Nominated	
British Academy Film Awards	13 March 2022	Outstanding Debut	Aleem Khan	Nominated	
Ivor Novello Award	19 May 2022	Best Original Film Score	Chris Roe	Nominated	
