= Joanna Scanlan =

British actress and writer (born 1961)

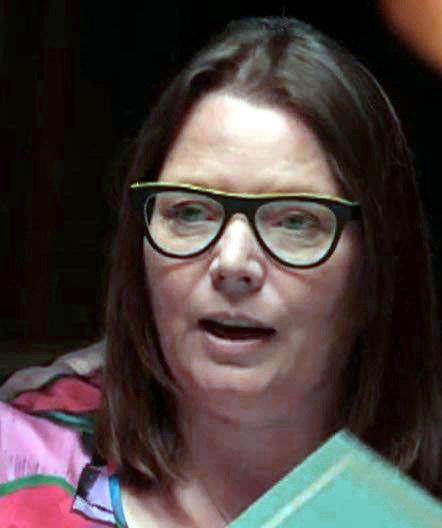
- Scanlan in 2019
- Born: Joanna Marion Scanlan; 27 October 1961 (age 65); West Kirby, Cheshire, England
- Education: Queens' College, Cambridge
- Occupations: Actress; writer
- Years active: 1997–present
- Spouse: Neil Bicknell (2009-present)

Joanna Marion Scanlan (born 27 October 1961) is a British actress and writer. On television, she is known for her roles in The Thick of It (2005–2012), Big School (2013–2014), Puppy Love (2014), No Offence (2015–2018), Requiem (2018), The Larkins (2021), and Riot Women (2025). She was nominated for three BAFTA TV Awards for Getting On (2009–2012), including two for Best Writing.

Scanlan's film appearances include Girl with a Pearl Earring (2003), Notes on a Scandal (2006), The Invisible Woman (2013), and Bridget Jones's Baby (2016). She won the BAFTA Award for Best Actress in a Leading Role for her performance in the 2020 film After Love, and was the first person since 2003 to win the award without being nominated for the corresponding Oscar. (Note: The last person to do so was Scarlett Johansson, who won at the 57th BAFTA Awards for her performance in Lost in Translation (2003).)

She was awarded an honorary docorate in 2023 by Bangor University for her outstanding contributions to popular entertainment, screenwriting, and learning through the media.

== Early life ==
Scanlan was born on 27 October 1961 in West Kirby, then in Cheshire, the daughter of hoteliers Michael and Patricia Scanlan. Although Joanna was born in England, her family comes from North Wales. At the age of three, she moved with her parents to North Wales, where she grew up.

Scanlan attended Brigidine Convent and Howell's School in Denbigh, as well as New Hall School in Chelmsford, Essex.

Scanlan studied history at Queens' College, Cambridge. During her studies, Scanlan joined the Cambridge Footlights, where she became friends with Tilda Swinton.

== Career ==
After graduation, Scanlan joined the academic staff of Leicester Polytechnic where she lectured in drama for five years, before undertaking a similar role at the Arts Council of Great Britain for three years. After the Arts Council of Great Britain was split in 1994, at age 34 Scanlan decided to try becoming a professional actor, quickly gaining the role as a nurse in ITV1's Peak Practice. This formed somewhat of a theme in her early career, playing a district nurse called Gillian in the last ever episode of One Foot in the Grave, then playing a midwife in The Other Boleyn Girl with Natalie Portman and Scarlett Johansson, before playing a nurse again alongside Ade Edmondson's doctor in ill-fated Doctors and Nurses, and latterly Dr Diana Dibbs in Doc Martin with Martin Clunes.

Scanlan is known for her portrayal of Terri Coverley, the notoriously useless senior press officer for the Department of Social Affairs and Citizenship in the British comedy television series The Thick of It from 2005 to 2012.

Among her successes is Scanlan's dark satirical NHS drama Getting On, which she starred and co-wrote with Jo Brand and Vicki Pepperdine. The series earned her a BAFTA nomination for Best Female Performance in a Comedy and a BAFTA Television Craft nomination for screenwriting in both 2011 and 2013. They were also nominated for Best Comedy Screenwriting at the Royal Television Awards in 2010 and Best Comedy at the South Bank Sky Arts Awards in 2011. The comedy series was adapted for an American audience with HBO, with Scanlan on board as an executive producer to closely work on script development. Scanlan was a guest star in the American version, reprising her role as Denise Flixter. The Emmy-nominated show ran for three seasons between 2013 and 2015.

Scanlan and Vicki Pepperdine teamed up again to write and star in their BBC Four comedy series Puppy Love, which follows two women at their dog training classes on the Wirral. Under their production company George and George Co., they are currently adapting Puppy Love with HBO for America and a new sitcom This Land is Ours is in development for US Network IFC.

Scanlan plays lead character DI Inspector 'Viv Deering' in Paul Abbott's BAFTA nominated and RTS award-winning primetime drama, No Offence.

Scanlan appeared as Cathy in the 2016 romantic comedy Bridget Jones's Baby.

Other film credits include Charles Dickens' wife in The Invisible Woman and roles in Get Santa, Testament of Youth, In the Loop, The Bad Education Movie, The Other Boleyn Girl, Stardust, Notes on a Scandal, Girl With A Pearl Earring, Pin Cushion, After Love and Kinky Boots.

Additional television credits include Death Comes To Pemberley, Fungus the Bogeyman, Mapp & Lucia, Heading Out, Stella, Doc Martin, One Foot in the Grave, Spaced and Slow Horses.

On stage, Scanlan has worked with Thea Sharrock in her production of Cloud 9 at the Almeida Theatre and Top Girls, with Rufus Norris in Vernon God Little at the Young Vic, and featured in Polly Teale's Madame Bovery.

Scanlan appeared in the first two episodes of McDonald & Dodds in 2020. In 2021, Scanlon played Ma opposite Bradley Walsh’s Pop in The Larkins.

In March 2022, she received the BAFTA Award for Best Actress in a Leading Role for the film After Love (2020). Scanlan gave thanks in Welsh, "Diolch yn fawr iawn as we say in my country! BAFTA thank you so much...some stories have surprising endings don't they," and also thanked the film’s writer and director and the crew.

In Sally Wainwright's TV series Riot Women, airing on BBC One in 2025, Scanlan plays Beth, a teacher forming a punk-rock band with a group of other women.

Scanlan starred in Mercy, written by Peter Bradshaw, which was released as an Audible Original in January 2026.

== Personal life ==
Scanlan and her husband Neil live in South Croydon, London.

Scanlan learned Welsh during S4C's Iaith ar Daith series.

On 7 June 2023, Scanlan became Patron of the David Lean Cinema, a community cinema based in the Clocktower of Croydon Town Hall.

== Filmography ==
=== Film ===
Year	Title	Role	Notes
2000	The Announcement	Debbie	
2003	Girl with a Pearl Earring	Tanneke	
2005	Butterflies	Jane	Short film
2005	A Little Trip to Heaven	Josie	
2005	Kinky Boots	Trish	
2006	Notes on a Scandal	Sue Hodge	
2007	The Moon and the Stars	Daisy Burke	
2007	Buying Porn	Mrs. Jack	Short film
2007	Grow Your Own	Barbara	
2007	My Mother	Nurse	Short film
2007	Stardust	Mormo	
2008	The Other Boleyn Girl	Mary's Midwife	
2009	In the Loop	Roz	
2009	The Calling	Sister Kevin	
2009	House of Boys	Nurse Suzanne	
2011	Hot Hot Hot	Mary-Ann	
2012	Dylan's Room	Penny	Short film
2013	Poe	Friend (voice)	
2013	The Invisible Woman	Catherine Dickens	
2014	Get Santa	Ruth	
2014	Testament of Youth	Aunt Belle	
2015	The Bad Education Movie	Susan Poulter	
2016	The Complete Walk: Macbeth	Porter	Short film
2016	Bridget Jones's Baby	Cathy, Make-up lady	
2017	How to Talk to Girls at Parties	Marion, Enn's Mum	
2017	Brexit Shorts: Burn	Carol	Short film
2017	Tulip Fever	Mrs. Overvalt	
2017	Pin Cushion	Lyn	
2018	Wild Honey Pie!	Janet, Ollie's mother	
2019	How to Build a Girl	Mrs. Belling	
2020	After Love	Mary	
2021	Don vs Lightning	Maggie	Short film
2021	Ropey	Heather	Short film
2022	This is Christmas	Linda	
2023	Wicked Little Letters	Ann	
2024	The Rising of the Sap	Elizabeth	Short film
2025	Bridget Jones: Mad About the Boy	Cathy	
TBA	Anxious People	TBA	Post-production

=== Television ===
Year	Title	Role	Notes
1997	Jane Eyre	Bessie	Television film
1997	Peak Practice	Midwife	Episode: "Eye of the Storm"
1998	Vanity Fair	Lady Crawley	Mini-series, 2 episodes: #1.1 and #1.2
1998	The Ruth Rendell Mysteries	Audrey Barker	2 episodes: "Road Rage: Parts One & Two"
1998	A Rather English Marriage	Sister	Television film
1998	Picking Up the Pieces	Gina	Episode: #1.6
1998	Casualty	Wendy Prescott	Episode: "Public Service"
1999	Murder Most Horrid	Iris Wood-Newton	Episode: "Frozen"
1999	Coming Soon	Claudia	Television film
1999	The Morwenna Banks Show		Episode: "The Morwenna Banks Show Sci-Fi Special"
1999	The Bill	Madelaine Tudor	Episode: "Trade Off"
1999	How Do You Want Me?	Parent Governor / Customer No.2	2 episodes: "I'm Not an Alcoholic" and "The Bad Builders"
2000	Cry Wolf	Julie	Episode: #1.5
2000	Human Remains	Nana	Mini-series, Episode: "An English Squeak"
2000	One Foot in the Grave	Gillian	Episode: "Things Aren't Simple Any More"
2000	EastEnders	Cellmate	2 episodes: #1.2040 and #1.2041
2001	My Family	Dental Assistant	Episode: "'Tis Pity She's a Whore"
2001	Spaced	Tina	Episode: "Mettle"
2001	Fun at the Funeral Parlour	Janet / Joan Jones	Episode: "The Heron Incident"
2001	Comedy Lab	Joy / Pity	Episode: "Daydream Believers: Brand New Beamer"
2003	Murder in Mind	Diana Spearman	Episode: "Echoes"
2003	Terri McIntyre	Moira Bell	Episode: "Model"
2003	The Deal	Sue Nye	Television film
2004	Doctors and Nurses	Stumpy Yates	4 episodes
2004	Little Britain	Anya	Episode: #2.2
2004	Doc Martin	Toni	Episode: "Gentlemen Prefer"
2005–2012	The Thick of It	Terri Coverley	Main role, 20 episodes
2007	Maxwell	Jennings	Television film
2007	Jekyll	Nurse	Mini-series, Episode: "Hyde"
2009	Runaway	Helpline Operator	Mini-series, Episode: #1.3
2009	Home Time	Mrs. Pitman	Episode: #1.1
2009–2012	Getting On	Sister Den Flixster	15 episodes. Also written by Scanlan
2010	Trinny & Susannah: From Boom to Bust	Potential Agent	Television film
2011	Casualty	Mary Griffin	Episode: "When the Bough Breaks..."
2011	Comedy Showcase	Mrs. Snedden	Episode: "Chickens"
2011	Doc Martin	Dr. Diana Dibbs	Episode: "Preserve the Romance"
2012	Stella	Nancy	5 episodes
2013	Heading Out	Toria	6 episodes
2013	Psychobitches	Barbara Woodhouse	Mini-series, Episode: "Playhouse Presents: Psychobitches Part Three"
2013	Coming Up	Denise's Mum	Episode: "Burger Van Champion"
2013	Death Comes to Pemberley	Mrs. Reynolds	Mini-series, 3 episodes
2013–2014	Big School	Mrs. Janine Klebb	10 episodes
2014	Puppy Love	Nana V	6 episodes. Also written by Scanlan
2014	Midsomer Murders	Clara Trout	Episode: "The Killings of Copenhagen"
2014	Rev.	Jill Mallory	2 episodes: #3.1 and #3.5
2014	Mapp & Lucia	Ursula 'Ursy' Pillson	Episode: #1.2
2015	Getting On	Sister Den Flixster	Guest appearance; Episode: "Am I Still Me?"
2015	Fungus the Bogeyman	Mildrew	Mini-series, 3 episodes
2015–2018	No Offence	DI Vivienne Deering	Main role, 21 episodes
2016	Hooten & the Lady	Penny McQuinn	Episode: "Bhutan"
2017	Requiem	Janice Gray	Main role. Mini-series, 6 episodes
2017	Philip K. Dick's Electric Dreams	Su	Episode: "Crazy Diamond"
2018	Sally4Ever	Stella	Episode: #1.4
2018	The Woman in White	Mrs. Vesey	Mini-series, 3 episodes
2018	I'll Get This	Herself	Dinner guest; 1 episode
2018–2019	Hold the Sunset	Sandra	9 episodes
2019	The Accident	Angela Griffiths	4 episodes
2020	Dracula	Mother Superior	Mini-series, Episode: "The Rules of the Beast"
2020	McDonald & Dodds	Kelly Mulcreevy	Episode: "A Wilderness of Mirrors"
2021–2022	The Larkins	Ma Larkin	13 episodes
2022	Y Golau (The Light in the Hall)	Sharon	6 episodes
2022	Gentleman Jack	Isabella 'Tib' Norcliffe	2 episodes
2022	Avenue 5	Johanna	Episode: "Is It a Good Dot?"
2023	Tabby McTat	Pat (voice)	Television film
2023	Black Ops	Chief Inspector Garner	Episode: #1.1
2023	Boat Story	Pat Tooh / Madame Béthune	6 episodes
2024	Slow Horses	Moira Tregorian	Series 4
2024	A Very Royal Scandal	Amanda Thirsk	Mini-series. 3 episodes
2025	Riot Women	Beth	TV series
2026	Missed Call	Sarah Gleason	TV series
2027	The Cadburys	Dorothy Adlington	Upcoming TV series

== Awards and nominations ==
Year	Award	Category	Work	Result	Ref
2010	Writers' Guild of Great Britain	Best Television Comedy	Getting On	Won	
2010	Royal Television Society Awards	Writer – Comedy	Getting On	Nominated	
2010	British Academy Television Awards	Best Female Comedy Performance	Getting On	Nominated	
2011	Broadcasting Press Guild Awards	Writer's Award	Getting On	Nominated	
2011	Royal Television Society Awards	Writer – Comedy	Getting On	Won	
2011	British Academy Television Craft Awards	Best Writer	Getting On	Nominated	
2013	Writers' Guild of Great Britain	Best Television Comedy	Getting On	Won	
2013	Royal Television Society Awards	Writer – Comedy	Getting On	Nominated	
2013	British Academy Television Craft Awards	Best Writer: Comedy	Getting On	Nominated	
2018	Evening Standard British Film Awards	Best Actress	Pin Cushion	Nominated	
2020	Thessaloniki International Film Festival	Best Actress	After Love	Won	
2021	Dublin International Film Festival	Best Actress	After Love	Won	
2021	British Independent Film Awards	Best Performance by an Actress	After Love	Won	
2022	London Film Critics Circle	Actress of the Year	After Love	Nominated	
2022	London Film Critics Circle	British/Irish Actress of the Year	After Love	Nominated	
2022	British Academy Film Awards	Best Actress in a Leading Role	After Love	Won	
