= Poly Styrene: I Am a Cliché =

- Directed by: Celeste Bell; Paul Sng
- Written by: Celeste Bell; Zoë Howe
- Produced by: Rebecca Mark-Lawson; Daria Nitsche; Matthew Silverman
- Cinematography: Nick Ward
- Edited by: Xanna Ward Dixon
- Music by: Marina Elderton
- Production companies: Generation Indigo Films; Polydoc Films; Tyke Films; Velvet Joy Productions
- Distributed by: Modern Films; Pacific Northwest Pictures
- Release date: 27 February 2021 (Glasgow)
- Running time: 134 minutes
- Country: United Kingdom
- Language: English
- Box office: 53,940

Poly Styrene: I Am a Cliché is a 2021 documentary film about Poly Styrene, the lead singer of X-Ray Spex. Directed by Celeste Bell and Paul Sng, the film features Bell, Poly Styrene's daughter, exploring her mother's history and legacy through archival footage and interviews with her peers and fans.

The film features narration of Poly Styrene's personal diaries by actress Ruth Negga.

The film premiered at the Glasgow Film Festival on 27 February 2021, in advance of its commercial release on a digital platform on 5 March.

== Reception ==
=== Critical response ===
On the review aggregator website Rotten Tomatoes, 98% of 54 critics' reviews are positive, with an average rating of 7.6/10. The website's consensus reads: "Poly Styrene: I Am a Cliché pays worthy tribute to its trailblazing subject with a documentary that honors her life as engagingly as it chronicles her career."

=== Accolades ===
At the British Independent Film Awards 2021, the film won the award for Best Documentary and the Raindance Discovery Award.

The film was the winner of the Documentary Award at the 2021 Whistler Film Festival.
