= Cow (2021 film) =

- Theatrical release poster
- Directed by: Andrea Arnold
- Produced by: Kat Mansoor
- Cinematography: Magda Kowalczyk
- Edited by: Rebecca Lloyd; Jacob Schulsinger; Nicolas Chaudeurge
- Production companies: BBC Film; Doc Society; Halycon Pictures; Submarine
- Distributed by: MUBI
- Release date: 8 July 2021 (Cannes)
- Running time: 94 minutes
- Country: United Kingdom
- Language: English
- Box office: $72,051

Cow is a 2021 British documentary film by Andrea Arnold, revolving around the life of a dairy cow.

The film premiered at the Cannes Film Festival on 8 July 2021.

== Synopsis ==
The film, shot in cinéma vérité-style, portrays the life of a female dairy cow, called Luma, at Park Farm in Kent, England.

== Production ==
Andrea Arnold had wanted to make a documentary revolving around an animal for years, and considered making one about a chicken, but ultimately kept coming back to a cow because she found their lives "interesting to look at." The film follows a milking cow and her calf, with Arnold warning the farmers about the potential response their farm would receive once the film was released. Arnold wanted the audience to "see" the cow, with real feelings, as well as "show the aliveness of a nonhuman animal." Production took place over the course of several years, with post-production taking place while Arnold was editing the second season of Big Little Lies. Arnold has further stated that the film was intended as a presentation of life, and is not political or vegan media. She has stated, "I'm not going to talk about that because I don’t want it to become about that." Rather, Arnold said "our relationship with the millions of non-human lives we use is very much part of our existence. I made Cow to invite engagement with that."

== Release ==
Cow had its world premiere at the Cannes Film Festival on 8 July 2021. Prior to, MUBI acquired distribution rights to the film in the UK, Ireland and Turkey. That same month, IFC Films acquired US distribution rights. It was also selected in 'Icon' section of 26th Busan International Film Festival and was screened on 11 October 2021.

== Reception ==
In the UK, the film earned $28,790 from 34 theaters in its opening weekend.

Cow has received critical acclaim. A review in New Scientist described it as 'moving and uncomfortable'. Current Affairs said the film 'is a heart-wrenching, hard watch' and shows the viewer that 'this is where your dairy comes from'. It holds a 96% approval rating on review aggregator website Rotten Tomatoes, based on 103 reviews, with a weighted average of 7.6/10. On Metacritic, the film holds a rating of 80 out of 100, based on 29 critics, indicating "universal acclaim".
