= Mason (given name) =

- Pronunciation: /ˈmeɪsən/
- Gender: Male

Origin
- Origin: Stone Worker
- Meaning: "One who works with stone"

Other names
- Nickname: Madon
- Related names: Macen, Masen, Mayson, Maison

Mason is a traditionally masculine given name, although recently the name has been used for either sex. Its origin is from the occupational surname Mason, which means "one who works with stone". It is also occasionally a nickname.

The popularity of the given name has risen in recent years, becoming the second most popular name given to boys in the United States in 2011. In 2022, it was the 32nd most popular name given to boys in Canada.

== People with the given name include ==
=== A ===
- Mason Abbiate (born 1998), American Paralympic soccer player
- Mason Adams (1919–2005), American actor
- Mason Aguirre (born 1987), American snowboarder
- Mason Amos (born 2004), Filipino-Australian basketball player
- Mason Andrews (1919–2006), American physician
- Mason Appleton (born 1996), American ice hockey player

=== B ===
- Mason Bailey (born 1996/1997), American stock car racing driver
- Mason Barbera (born 1997), Australian racing driver
- Mason Barrett (born 1999), English footballer
- Mason Bates (born 1977), American composer
- Mason Durell Betha (born 1975), American rapper
- Mason Bennett (born 1996), English footballer
- Mason Bennett (Canadian football) (born 1997), Canadian football player
- Mason Black (born 1999), American baseball player
- Mason Bloomfield (born 1996), English footballer
- Mason Brayman (1813–1895), American attorney and army officer
- Mason Brodine (born 1988), American football player
- Mason Brooks (born 1999), American football player
- Mason Brown (1799–1867), American politician
- Mason Burstow (born 2003), English footballer

=== C ===
- Mason Carter (1834–1909), American army officer
- Mason Caton-Brown (born 1993), Jamaican rugby league footballer
- Mason Cerruto (born 1996), Italian rugby league footballer
- Mason Chamberlin (1727–1787), English painter
- Mason Cobb (born 2001), American football player
- Mason Fitch Cogswell (1761–1830), American physician
- Mason Cole (born 1996), American football player
- Mason Cook (born 2000), American actor
- Mason Cooley (1927–2002), American aphorist
- Mason Vale Cotton (born 2002), American actor
- Mason Cox (born 1991), American Australian rules footballer
- Mason Crane (born 1997), English cricketer
- Mason Crosby (born 1984), American football player
- Mason Curtis (born 2005), American football player

=== D ===
- Mason Daring (born 1949), American musician
- Mason C. Darling (1801–1866), American politician
- Mason Diaz (born 2000), American stock car racing driver
- Mason Alan Dinehart (born 1936), American business consultant
- Mason J. Dunn (born 1985), American lawyer
- Mason Durie (disambiguation), multiple people
- Mason Duval (born 2001), Caymanian footballer
- Mason Dye (born 1994), American actor

=== E ===
- Mason Edwards (born 2005), American baseball player
- Mason Emerson (born 1996), New Zealand rugby union footballer
- Mason Englert (born 1999), American baseball player
- Mason Erla (born 1997), American baseball player
- Mason Espinosa, American football coach
- Mason Ewing (born 1982), Cameroonian fashion designer

=== F ===
- Mason Fairchild (born 2001), American football player
- Mason Falslev (born 2001), American basketball player
- Mason Fawns (born 1999), English footballer
- Mason Ferlic (born 1993), American runner
- Mason Filippi (born 1998), American auto racing driver
- Mason Fine (born 1997), American football player
- Mason Finley (born 1990), American shot putter and discus thrower
- Mason Flesch (born 1999), Canadian rugby union footballer
- Mason Fluharty (born 2001), American baseball player
- Mason Forbes (born 1999), American basketball player
- Mason Foster (born 1989), American football player
- Mason Fowler (born 1993), American mixed martial artist
- Mason Fung (born 2004), Hong Kong actor

=== G ===
- Mason Gaffney (1923–2020), American economist
- Mason Gamble (born 1986), American actor
- Mason Garcia (born 2002), American football player
- Mason Geertsen (born 1995), Canadian ice hockey player
- Mason Gillis (born 2000), American basketball player
- Mason Gooding (born 1996), American actor
- Mason Gordon (rugby union) (born 2003), Australian rugby union footballer
- Mason Grady (born 2002), Welsh rugby union footballer
- Mason Graham (born 2003), American football player
- Mason Greenwood (born 2001), English footballer
- Mason Grimes (born 1992), Guamanian footballer
- Mason Welch Gross (1911–1977), American television personality

=== H ===
- Mason Hale (1929–1990), American lichenologist
- Mason Hammond (1903–2002), American professor
- Mason Hancock (born 2003), English footballer
- Mason Alexander Hargrave (1923–1988), American community organizer
- Mason Harwell (1806–1879), American auctioneer
- Mason Hawkins (born 1948), American investor
- Mason Heintschel (born 2007), American football player
- Mason Hill (geologist) (1904–1992), American geologist
- Mason Ho (born 1988), American surfer
- Mason Hoffenberg (1922–1986), American writer
- Mason Holgate (born 1996), English footballer
- Mason Hollyman (born 2000), British cyclist
- Mason Howell (born 2007), American golfer

=== J ===
- Mason Jackson (1819–1903), English engraver
- Mason Jennings (born 1975), American singer-songwriter
- Mason Jobst (born 1994), American ice hockey player
- Mason Jones (disambiguation), multiple people

=== K ===
- Mason Kayne (born 1985), English actor
- Mason Kinsey (born 1998), American football player

=== L ===
- Mason Lee (born 1990), Taiwanese-American actor
- Mason Lindahl, American guitarist
- Mason Lino (born 1994), Samoan rugby league footballer
- Mason Lohrei (born 2001), American ice hockey player
- Mason Lowe (1993–2019), American rodeo cowboy
- Mason Ludwig (born 2002), American stock car racing driver
- Mason Lund (born 2002), New Zealand rugby union footballer

=== M ===
- Mason Madsen (born 2001), American basketball player
- Mason Maggio (born 2004), American stock car racing driver
- Mason Malmuth (born 1951), American poker player
- Mason Manville (born 1997), American wrestler
- Mason Marchment (born 1995), Canadian ice hockey player
- Mason Martin (born 1999), American baseball player
- Mason Massey (born 1997), American racing driver
- Mason Mastroianni (born 1978), American comic artist
- Mason Mathews (1803–1878), American politician
- Mason Maury (1847–1919), American architect
- Mason McCormick (born 2000), American football player
- Mason McCoy (born 1995), American baseball player
- Mason McDonald (born 1996), Canadian ice hockey player
- Mason McGroder (born 2008), Australian long jumper
- Mason McKenzie, American football player
- Mason McTavish (born 2003), Swiss ice hockey player
- Mason Melia (born 2007), Irish footballer
- Mason Miller (born 1998), American baseball player
- Mason Mingus (born 1994), American stock car racing driver
- Mason Mitchell (born 1994), American stock car racing driver
- Mason Morelli (born 1996), American ice hockey player
- Mason Mount (born 1999), English footballer
- Mason Munn (born 2006), Northern Irish footballer
- Mason Murphy (born 2002), American football player
- Mason Mushore (born 2002), Zimbabwean footballer
- Mason Musso (born 1989), American singer-songwriter

=== N ===
- Mason Neely (born 1979), American record producer
- Mason Novick (born 1974), American film producer

=== O ===
- Mason O'Malley (born 2001), English footballer

=== P ===
- Mason Alexander Park (born 1995), American actor and singer
- Mason Parris (born 1999), American wrestler
- Mason Patrick (1863–1942), American army officer
- Mason Peatling (born 1997), Australian basketball player
- Mason Peck, American professor
- Mason S. Peters (1844–1914), American politician
- Mason Phelps (1885–1945), American golfer
- Mason Phelps Jr. (1949–2021), American horse trainer
- Mason Pierce (born 1999), Canadian football player
- Mason Pline (born 2000), American football player
- Mason Plumlee (born 1990), American basketball player
- Mason Porter (born 1976), American mathematician
- Mason Posa, American football player

=== R ===
- Mason Raige (born 1972), American professional wrestler
- Mason Ramsey (born 2006), American singer-songwriter
- Mason Raymond (born 1985), Canadian ice hockey player
- Mason Redman (born 1997), Australian rules footballer
- Mason Reese (born 1965), American actor
- Mason Reiger (born 2002), American football player
- Mason Remey (1874–1974), American religious leader
- Mason Richards, Guyanese-American filmmaker
- Mason Richman (born 2002), American football player
- Mason Robertson (born 1994), Scottish footballer
- Mason Robinson (born 1989), American football player
- Mason Rocca (born 1977), Italian-American basketball player
- Mason Rudolph (disambiguation), multiple people
- Mason Ruffner (born 1947), American singer-songwriter
- Mason Ryan (born 1982), Wrestler

=== S ===
- Mason Schreck (born 1993), American football player
- Mason Scott (1865–1916), English rugby union footballer
- Mason Sears (1899–1973), American politician
- Mason Shaw (born 1998), Canadian ice hockey player
- Mason Shefa (born 1993), American filmmaker
- Mason Shipley (born 2002), American football player
- Mason Spence (born 1994), English footballer
- Mason Spencer (1892–1962), American planter
- Mason Springthorpe (born 1994), English footballer
- Mason Stajduhar (born 1997), American soccer player
- Mason S. Stone (1857–1940), American educator and politician
- Mason Symons (born 1989), American wheelchair rugby player

=== T ===
- Mason Tappan (1817–1886), American politician
- Mason Tatafu (born 2002), Australian footballer
- Mason Taylor (born 2004), American football player
- Mason Teague (born 2003), Australian rugby league footballer
- Mason Terry (born 2004), English footballer
- Mason Thames (born 2007), American actor
- Mason A. Thayer (1839–??), American politician
- Mason B. Thomas (1866–1912), American football coach
- Mason Thompson (born 1998), American baseball player
- Mason Tipton (born 2000), American football player
- Mason Tobin (born 1987), American baseball player
- Mason Toye (born 1998), American soccer player
- Mason Trafford (born 1986), Canadian soccer player
- Mason Tupaea (born 2002), New Zealand rugby union footballer
- Mason Tvert (born 1982), American activist

=== U ===
- Mason Unck (born 1980), American football player

=== V ===
- Mason Vaugh (1894–1978), American agriculturalist
- Mason Via (born 1997), American singer-songwriter

=== W ===
- Mason Walters, American football player
- Mason Walters (racing driver), American stock car racing driver
- Mason Warren (born 1997), English footballer
- Mason Weaver, American motivational speaker
- Mason Webb (born 1986), American soccer player
- Mason Locke Weems (1759–1825), American minister
- Mason West (born 2007), American ice hockey player
- Mason Wiley (1955–1994), American author
- Mason Williams (disambiguation), multiple people
- Mason Wood (born 1993), Australian rules footballer

== Fictional characters ==
- Mason Morgan, in the Australian soap opera Home and Away
- Mason "Dipper" Pines in the Disney Channel Original show, Gravity Falls
- Mason Turner, in the Australian soap opera Neighbours
- Mason Verger, in the novel, movie and TV series Hannibal

== See also ==
- Mason (disambiguation)
- Mason (surname)
