= Mason =

Mason or Masons may refer to:

== Occupations ==
- Mason, brick mason, or bricklayer, a worker who lays bricks
- Stone mason, a craftsman in the stone-cutting and shaping industry

== People and fictional characters ==
- Mason (Freemasonry), a term for a member of the Freemason fraternal society
- Mason (given name), including a list of people and fictional characters
- Mason (surname), including a list of people and fictional characters
- Mason family, an American political family
- Mason, a sept of Clan Sinclair
- Mason (director), American pornographic film director
- Mason (musician), Dutch electronic music producer Iason Chronis (born 1980)

== Places in the United States ==
- Mason, Illinois, a town
- Mason, Grant County, Kentucky, an unincorporated community
- Mason, Magoffin County, Kentucky, an unincorporated community
- Masons, Maryland, an unincorporated community
- Mason, Michigan, a city
- Mason, Houghton County, Michigan
- Mason, Nevada, an unincorporated community
- Mason, New Hampshire, a town
- Mason, Ohio, a city
- Mason, Oklahoma, an unincorporated community
- Mason, South Dakota, a ghost town
- Mason, Tennessee, a town
- Mason, Texas, a city
- Mason, West Virginia, a town
- Mason (town), Wisconsin
  - Mason, Wisconsin, a village within the town
- Mason City (disambiguation)
- Mason County (disambiguation)
- Mason Township (disambiguation)
- Mason Lake, Washington
- Fort Mason, San Francisco, California

== Schools ==
- Mason School of Business, the business school of College of William & Mary
- Mason Science College, a former university college in Birmingham, England
- Mason High School (disambiguation)
- Mason City High School, Mason City, Iowa

== Science ==
- Mason (crater), on the Moon
- MASON (Java), an artificial-life computer simulation development environment

== Transportation ==
- Mason (streetcar), the first streetcar in the United States
- Mason Machine Works, Taunton, Massachusetts, known for its locomotives
- Mason Motor Car Company, a brass-era car company
- Mason Truck, a subsidiary of Durant Motors of the 1920s
- Mason City Municipal Airport, Mason City, Iowa
- Mason County Airport (disambiguation)
- Mason station, a former railroad depot in Mason, Michigan

== Other uses ==
- USS Mason, several warships
- Mason (American band), a rock band
- Mason Opera House, a former venue in Los Angeles
- Masons (novel), by Alexey Pisemsky
- Mason bee (Osmia species), of the family Megachilidae
- Mason wasp (disambiguation)

== See also ==
- Mason House (disambiguation)
- Mason jar, a glass jar used to preserve food
- Mason's Root Beer, an American soft drink
- Masone, a town in the Alps Region of northern Italy
- Macon (disambiguation)
- Marson (disambiguation)
- Masson (disambiguation)
- Mason–Dixon line
