= Mazon =

Mazon may refer to:

== Places in the United States ==
- Mazon, Illinois, a village
- Mazon Creek fossils
- Mazon River
- Mazon station, Mazon, Illinois
- Mazon Township, Grundy County, Illinois

== Organizations ==
- MAZON: A Jewish Response to Hunger, a nonprofit organization dedicated to fighting world hunger

== Surname ==
- Carlos Mazón (born 1974), Spanish politician
- José María Mazón Sainz (1901-1981), Spanish politician
- José María Mazón (born 1951), Spanish politician
- Lázaro Mazón Alonso (born 1959), Mexican politician

== See also ==
- Mason (disambiguation)
