= Quincy Dredge Number Two =

Calumet and Hecla/Quincy Reclaiming Sand Dredge
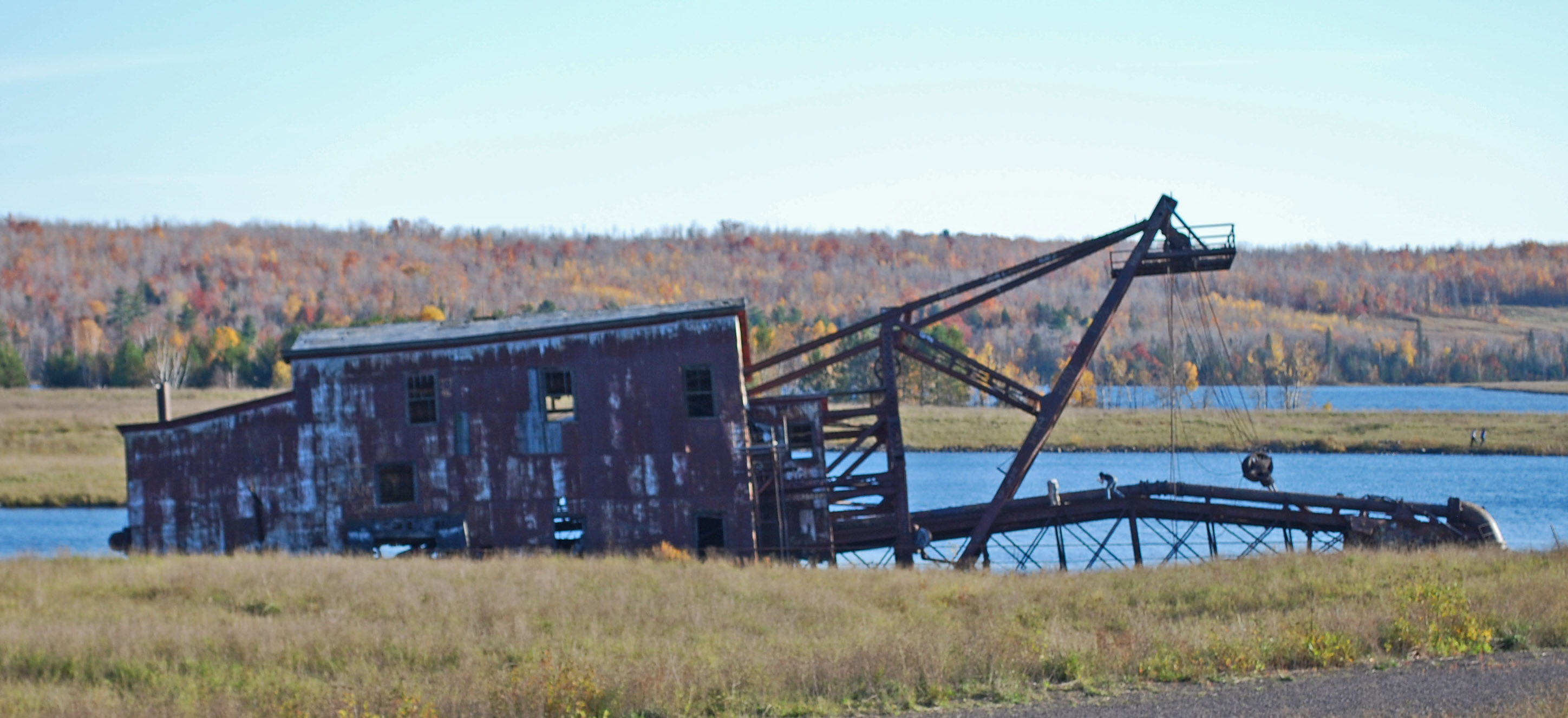

- Location within Michigan
- 47°8′39″N 88°27′35″W
- Location: M-26 near Torch Lake, Osceola Township

History
- Built: 1914

Site notes
- Governing body: State

Michigan State Historic Site
- Designated: July 26, 1978

The Quincy Dredge Number Two (previously known as the Calumet and Hecla Dredge Number One) is a dredge currently sunk in shallow water in Torch Lake, across M-26 from the Quincy Mining Company Stamp Mills Historic District and just east of Mason in Osceola Township. It was constructed to reclaim stamping sand from the lake for further processing, and was designated a Michigan State Historic Site in 1978.

== History ==
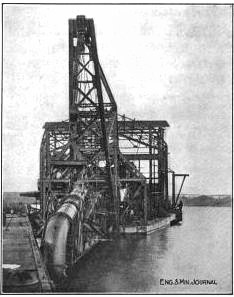
Bow of C&H Dredge #1 during construction

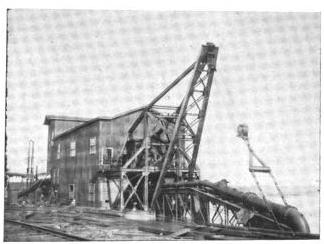
Dredge c. 1915, soon after construction

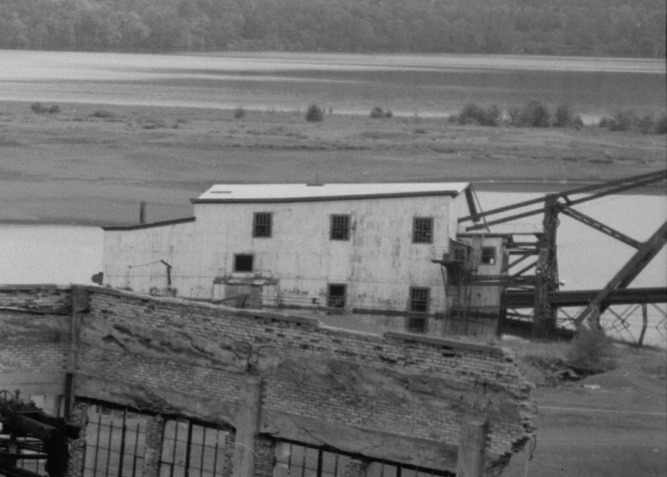
Dredge in 1978

The Reclaiming Sand Dredge was constructed for the Calumet and Hecla Mining Company in 1914 by the Bucyrus Company of South Milwaukee, Wisconsin, and designated the Calumet and Hecla Dredge Number One. The dredge was used to reclaim previously-milled sand deposited in the lake after it had gone through the stamp mill. The dredged sand contained copper that earlier stamping technology had not been able to separate out. Improvements in stamping efficiency and cost increases in traditional shaft mining made these sand tailings economically feasible to reclaim and re-stamp.

Calumet and Hecla used the dredge at their Lake Linden Reclamation Plant until 1951. In 1951, the Quincy Mine purchased the dredge and designated it as Quincy Dredge Number Two, using it at their own reclamation facility, which had been in operation since 1943. The mine's Quincy Dredge Number One sank in 1956, and Dredge Number Two was used until 1967, when it too sank during a winter lay-up. By this time, copper prices had fallen low enough that the reclamation process was not profitable, and the Quincy Mine abandoned both the dredge and its reclamation facility.

== Description ==
The dredge is a large, box-like vessel that was used to remove sand from the bottom of the lake. The vessel has a steel hull measuring 110 feet (34 m) long, 56 feet (17 m) wide, and nine feet (2.7 m) deep. The decking overhangs the hull by eight feet (2.4 m) per side, giving an overall width of 72 feet (22 m). The dredge could process over 10,000 short tons (9,100 t) of sand per day, and had a 141-foot (43 m) suction pipe that could work in 115 feet (35 m) of water.

The dredge is currently sunk into shallow water, and canted over to one side. Most of the superstructure and the large boom are visible above the waterline.
