= Langlaagte Stamp Mill =

Heritage mining equipment display

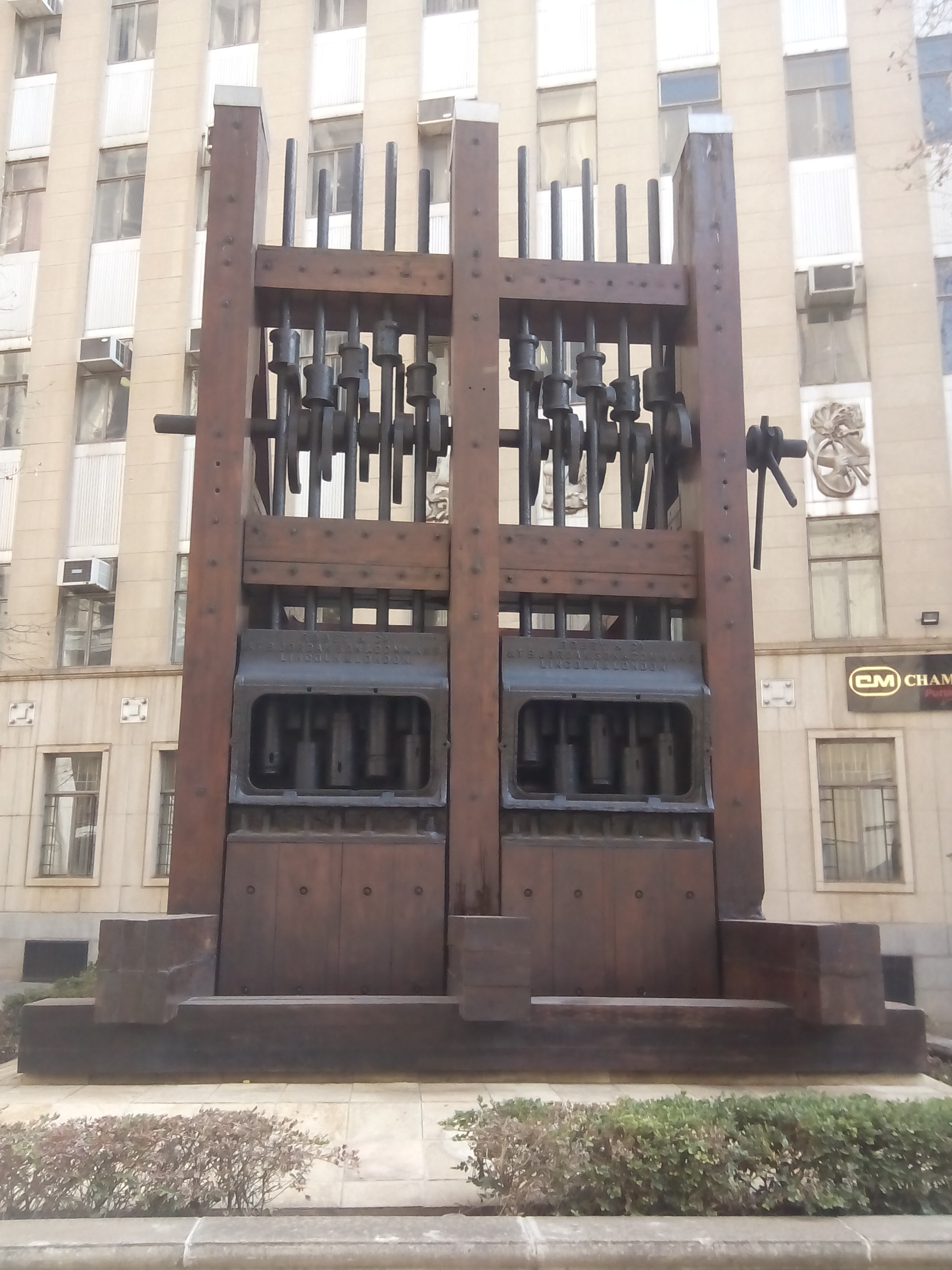
Langlaagte Stamp Mill in Main Street Johannesburg

The Langlaagte Stamp mill or battery as they were called in the gold rush era of Johannesburg, is one of the few that have survived from the Robinson Mine in Langlaagte. Located at Main Street in Johannesburg, the 10 stamp mill went into operation at the Robinson Mine in Langlaagte in September 1886, in the earliest stamp mills on the Witwatersrand. Stamp mills were invented in Europe in the 1600s to crush ore to extract minerals, especially gold. A stamp mill is just a big mortar & pestle, ore and water are fed in one side, a steam engine lifts the big stampers and they fall on the ore by gravity.
