= Mason Airport =

Mason Airport may refer to:

- Mason Jewett Field in Mason, Michigan, United States (FAA: TEW)
- Mason City Municipal Airport in Mason City, Iowa, United States (FAA/IATA: MCW)
- Fleming-Mason Airport in Flemingsburg, Kentucky, United States (FAA: FGX)

== See also ==
- Mason County Airport (disambiguation)
