= Mason High School =

Mason High School can refer to various schools in the United States:

- George Mason High School in Falls Church, Virginia
- Mason High School in Mason, Michigan
- William Mason High School in Mason, Ohio
- Mason High School, Mason, Texas
- Mason High School (closed) in Tulsa, Oklahoma

== See also ==
- North Mason High School
