= Quincy Mining Company Stamp Mills Historic District =

Historic district in Michigan, United States

- U.S. National Register of Historic Places
- U.S. Historic district
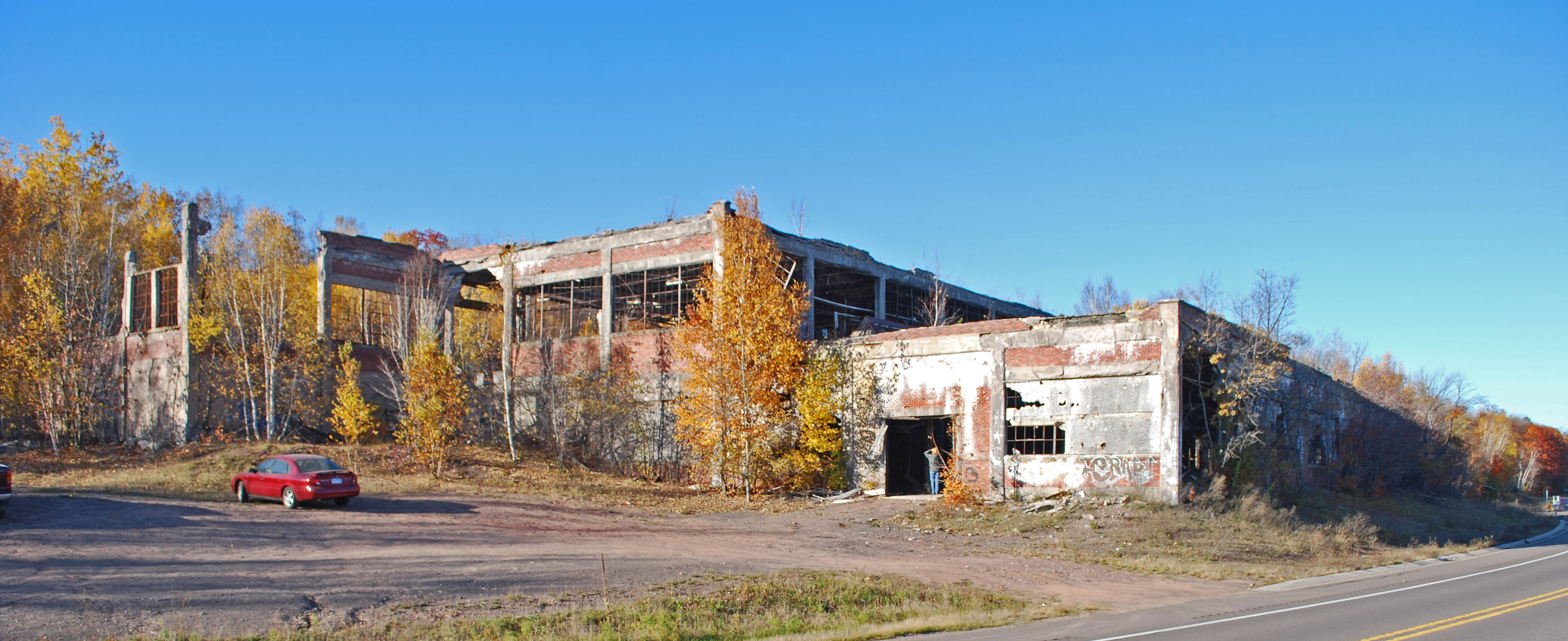
- Addition to Stamp Mill Number One in 2010

- Location within Michigan Location within the United States
- Interactive map
- Location: M-26 near Torch Lake, Osceola Township
- Coordinates: 47°8′48″N 88°27′36″W
- Area: 350 acres (140 ha)
- Built: 1888
- Architectural style: Colonial Revival
- NRHP reference No.: 07000750
- Added to NRHP: July 18, 2007

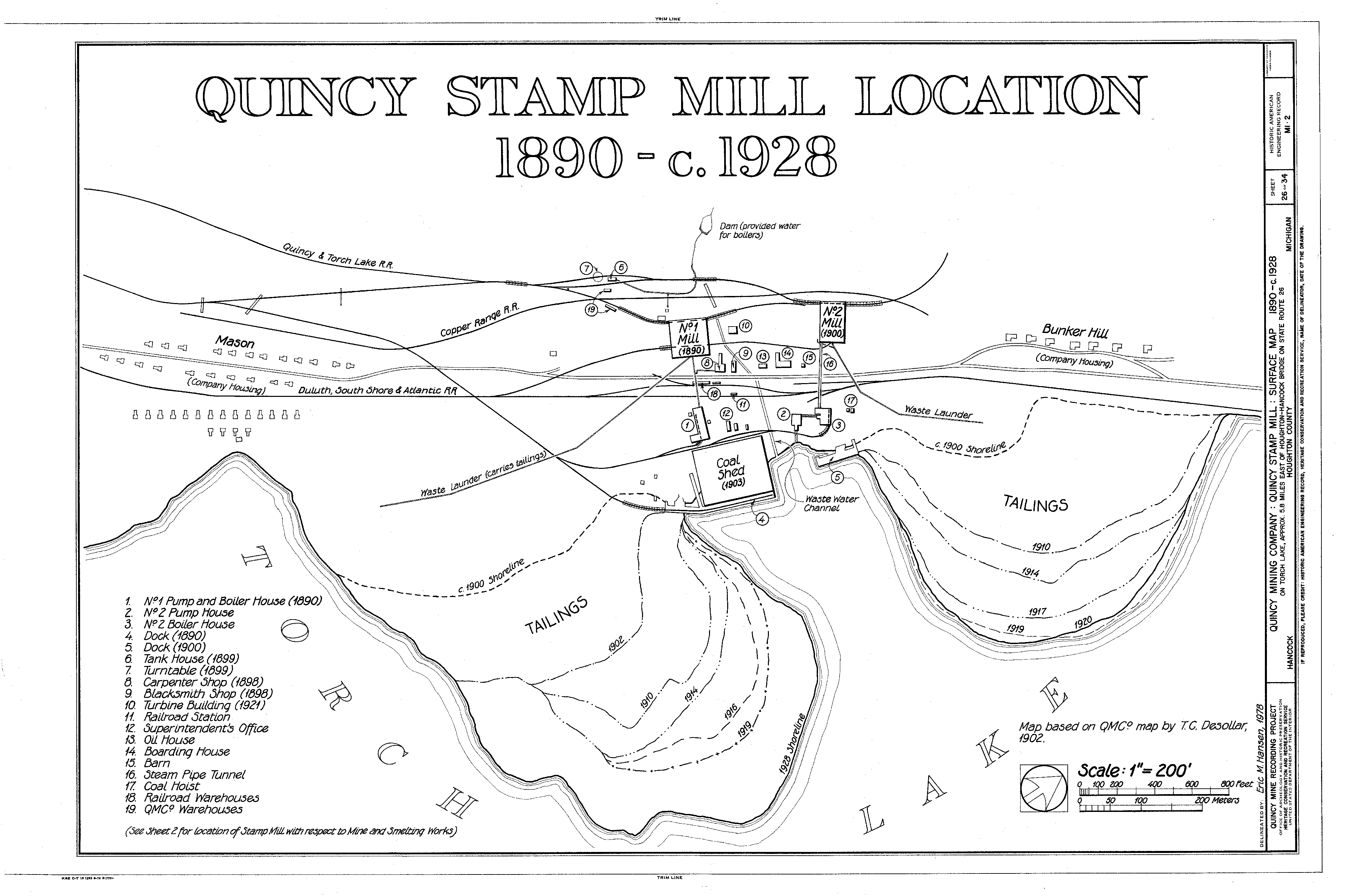
Drawing of Quincy Stamp Mills site

The Quincy Mining Company Stamp Mills Historic District is a historic stamp mill (used to crush copper-bearing rock, separating the copper ore from surrounding rock) located on M-26 near Torch Lake, just east of Mason in Osceola Township. It was listed on the National Register of Historic Places in 2007.

== Original stamp mill (1860–1888) ==
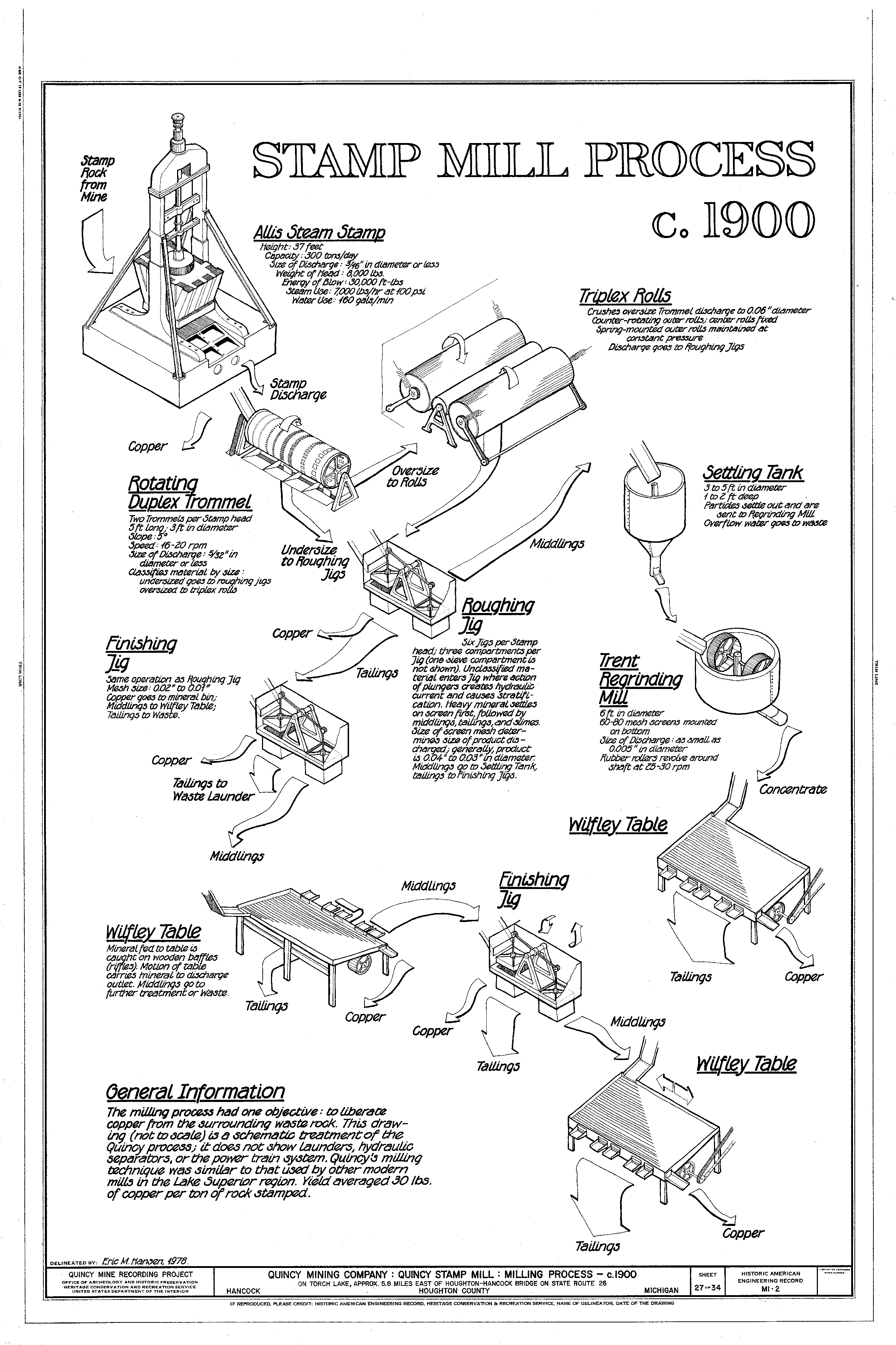
Outline of stamping process

The original Quincy Stamp Mill was built in 1860 on Portage Lake in Hancock, close to the Quincy Mine. This facility, however, dumped an enormous amount of sand tailings into the lake, and the sand soon threatened to encroach on the navigable channel of the lake. In the mid-1880s, the federal government set minimum harbor lines and stiff penalties for breaching them, and eventually filed suit against the Quincy Mine for dumping in Portage Lake. In addition, Quincy was in the process of acquiring the nearby Pewabic Mine, and management knew they would need to increase the company's stamping capacity.

Stamp mills require a large amount of water to operate, and so are invariably located near a large body of water; this limited the range of sites in which a new mill could be placed. After some analysis, the Quincy management decided on Torch Lake as the site for the new mill and purchased 300 acres on the shore, some six miles east of the previous location.

== Construction of stamp mill (1888–1894) ==
Work began on the new stamp mill in 1888. The first building constructed was a boarding house, followed by a dock, cistern, and foundations for other buildings. In 1889, six substantial frame buildings were constructed on site, as well as a railway connecting the stamp mill to the mine, and stamping equipment was installed. Mill number one was a wooden structure measuring 198 feet by 120 feet. The pump and boiler house were located on the south side of the roadway that is now M-26. It was a stone structure measuring 154 feet by 56 feet. An elevated conduit carried water and steam over the road to the mill, and handling facilities were built at the dock. The facility was completed and opened for milling in 1890. The site originally had two stamps; a third was added immediately after opening, and two more were added in 1892.

More structures were added to the site over time, beginning with extensions to the dock in 1890 and 1891, an addition to the boiler house in 1891, and additions to the mill in 1891 and 1892. In all, the Quincy Mine spent $457,000 between 1888 and 1894 in constructing and equipping their new mill site, of which $182,000 went to the mill and its stamping equipment.

== Second mill and additions (1894–1922) ==
However, as early as 1894, mine production outstripped the capacity of the mill, and a new mill was planned. The second stamp mill was built just north of the first; this mill was an iron-framed structure measuring 132 feet by 216 feet. It was constructed in 1899 by the Wisconsin Bridge and Iron Company at a cost of $22,450. The second mill opened in late 1900 with three mills. To service the additional capacity, new boiler and pump house buildings were also constructed. Over the next two decades, minor alterations were made to the structures of the complex (including the erection of a new 175-foot smokestack for the boilerhouse in 1916) while the milling process and machinery were continuously refined.

However, the rise in the price of copper during World War I provided both impetus and resources for expansion of the site. Reinforced concrete and brick additions to both stamp mills were constructed in 1919; the addition to mill no. 1 was 123 feet by 215 feet, and the addition to mill no. 2 was 91 feet by 132 feet. The additions were equipped and functioning by 1920. The mill also changed their production of electrical power, building a structure to house a new turbine near mill no. 1. Construction on the new building, a brick structure measuring 36 feet by 38 feet by 45 feet high, began in 1921; the turbine was online in 1923.

1890–1925 Images
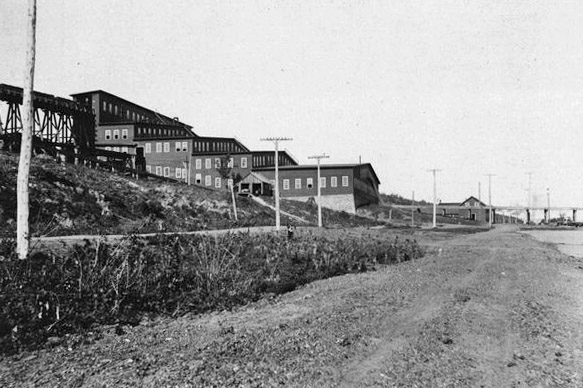
Mill Number One, c. 1890

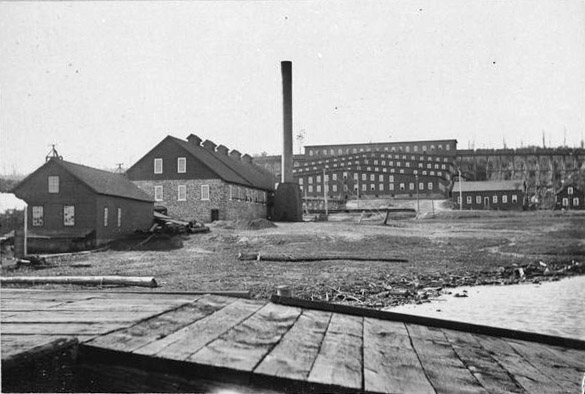
Mill Number One, c. 1890, including pump and boiler buildings.

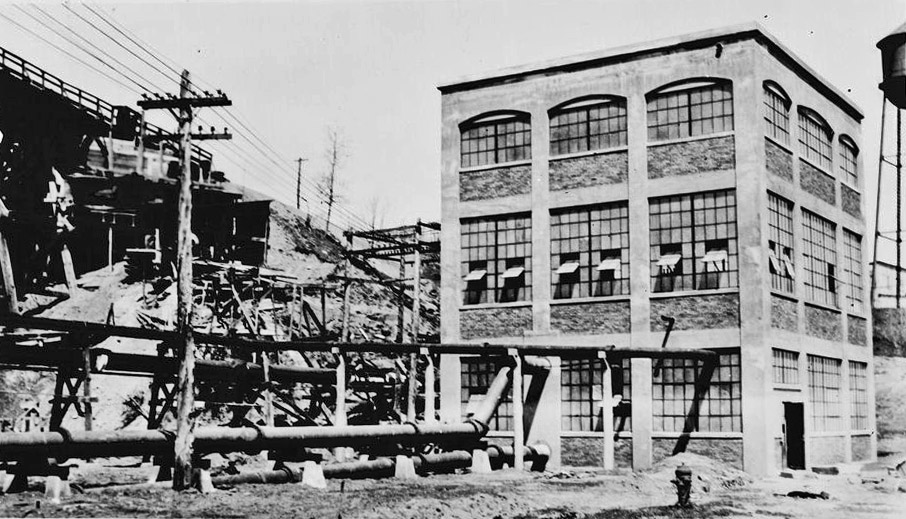
Turbine house near Mill Number One, c. 1925

== Decline (1922 – present) ==
However, the mill began to decline after the end of the war. In 1922, the second mill was closed. Additional equipment was installed in mill no. 1 as technology improved, including labor-saving devices installed in 1929 and 1930. However, the Great Depression hit the mining industry hard, and the Quincy Mine closed in 1931, shuttering the Stamp Mills.

As the Depression wound onward, copper prices rebounded, and the mine and mills were refurbished in late 1937 and re-opened on a limited scale in early 1938. However, the mine was only barely profitable, and after World War II ended, and with it the price guarantees from the federal government, the mine and stamp mills closed permanently.

Mill number two was demolished early, as well as the original portions of mill number one, but the later additions to mill number one remain.

1978 Images
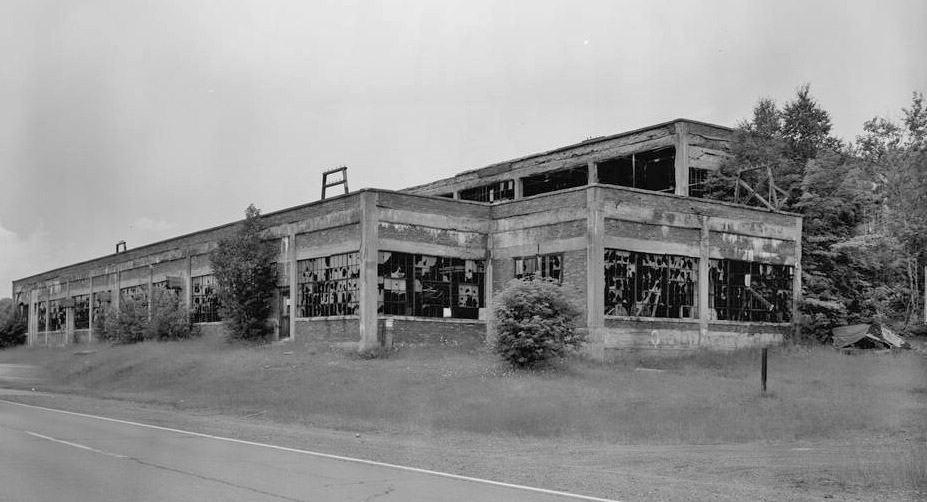
Mill Number One

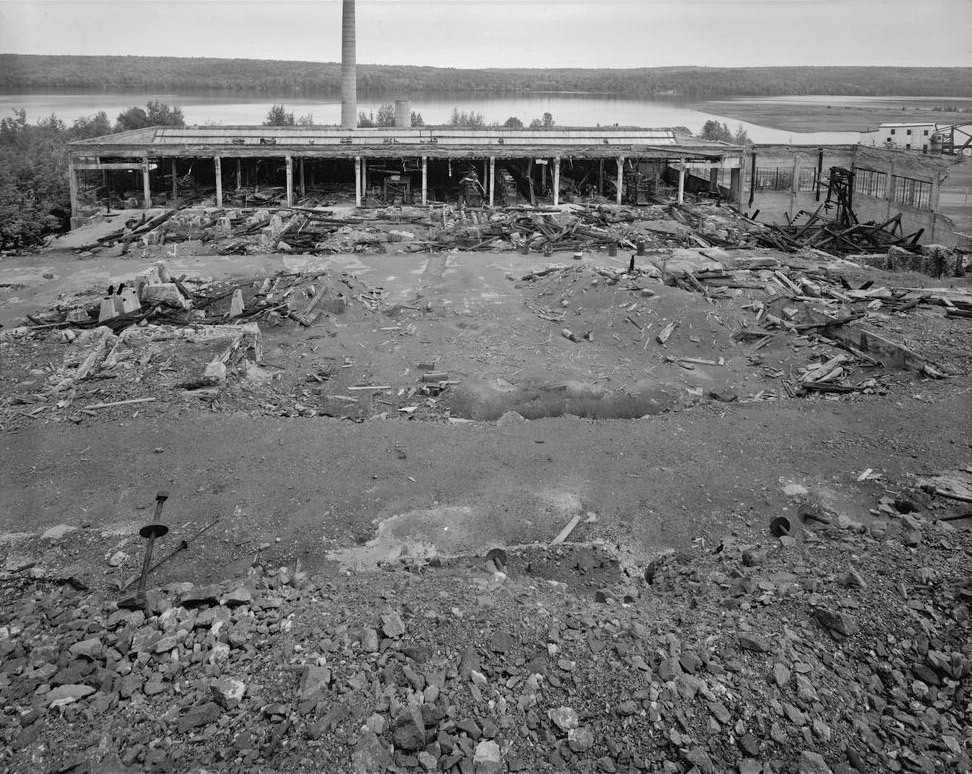
Rear of Mill Number One. Note cleared area where original portion of mill stood, and smokestack in background.

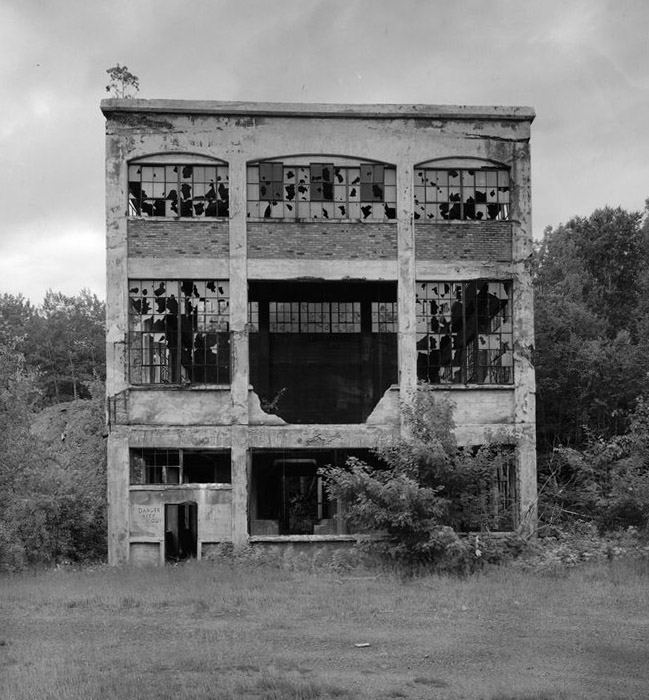
Turbine house near Mill Number One

2010 Images
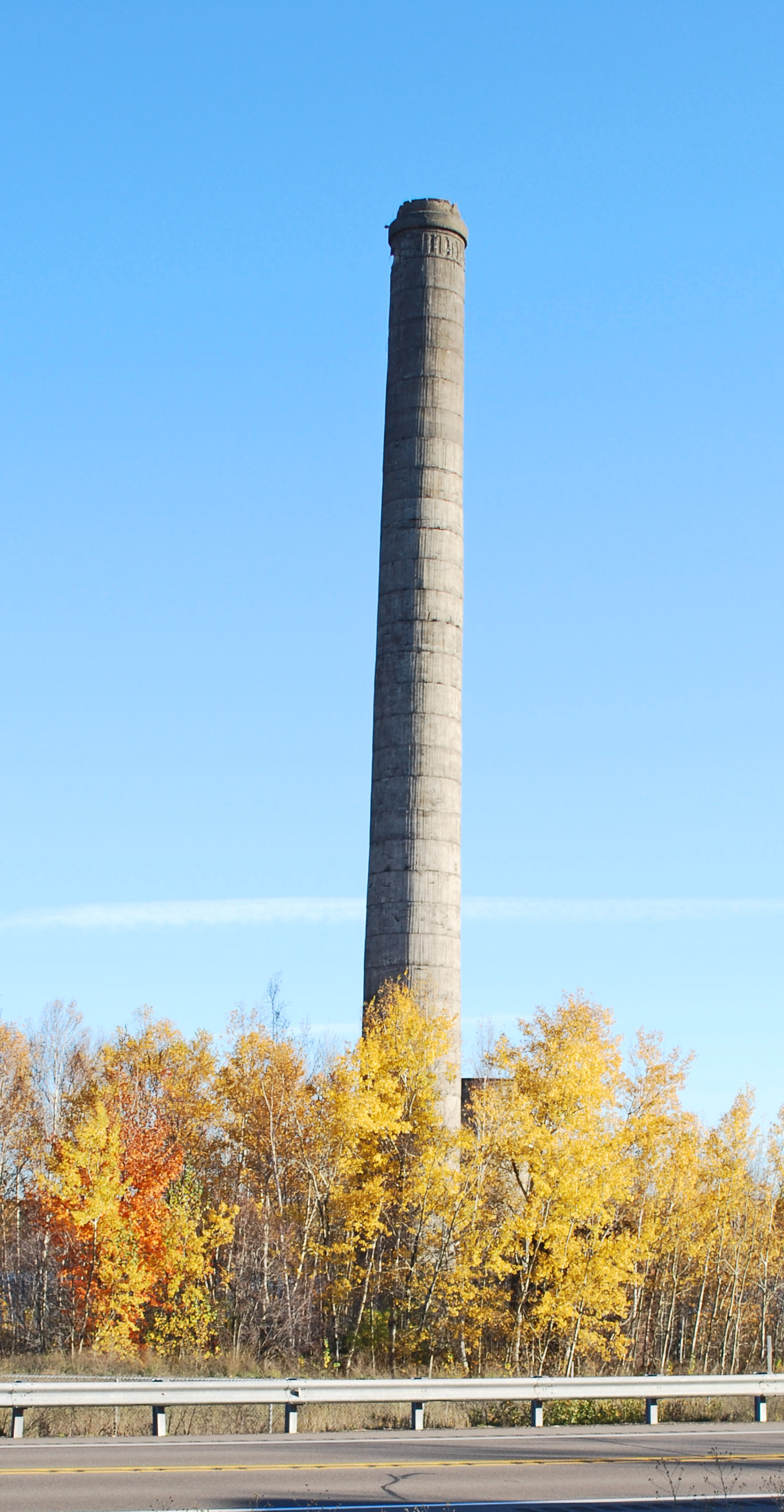
Smokestack of boilerhouse

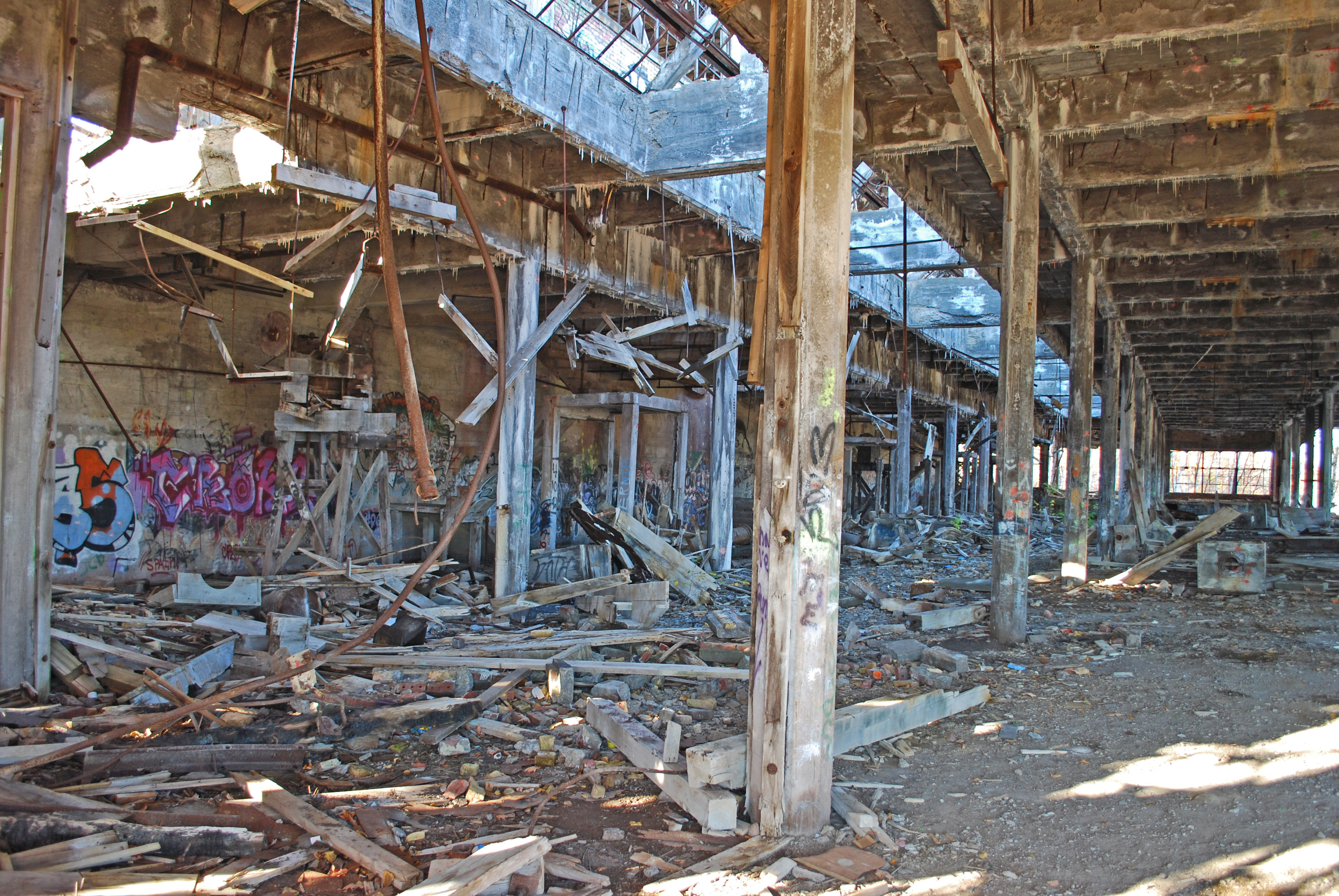
Interior of Mill Number One addition

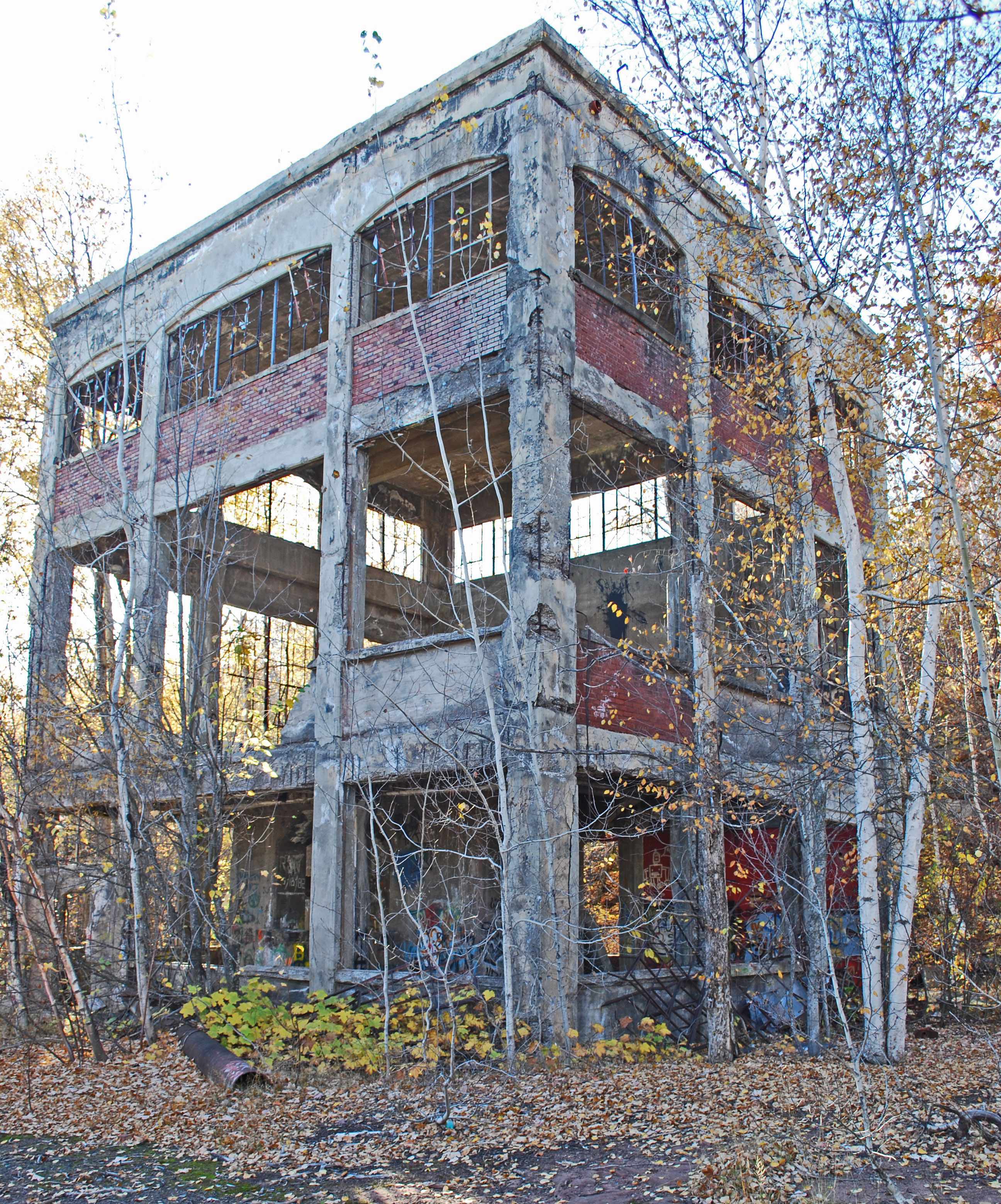
Turbine house near Mill Number One
