= Stamp sand =

Aspect of ore processing

Stamp sand, photographed near Houghton, MI

Stamp sand is a coarse sand left over from the processing of ore in a stamp mill. In the United States, the most well-known deposits of stamp sand are in the Copper Country of the Upper Peninsula of Michigan, where it is black or dark gray, and may contain hazardous concentrations of trace metals.

In the 19th and early 20th centuries, many metal mines used stamp mills to process ore-bearing rock. The rock was brought to a stamp mill to be crushed. After crushing the material was mechanically separated to extract metals, or chemically treated by acids if the metal could be leached out. The size of the crushed material depended on the nature of the ore found in each mining district.

== Copper Country of Michigan ==
In the Copper Country region, the rock was reduced to 1–2-millimeter (0.039–0.079 in) fragments because further crushing would not result in enough additional copper recovery to be economical. The sand was then usually disposed near the mill. As mills often relied on steam power to operate and water for some of the processing methods, they were built on the shore of lakes and rivers. The stamp sand was thus dumped into the water, sometimes growing deep enough to create entirely new land. Stamp sand discarded into the water was sometimes reclaimed with dredges to be re-stamped when more efficient stamping technology was developed (for example, Quincy Dredge Number Two).

Stamp sand may be hazardous to human health, since it contains trace amounts of harmful heavy metals (such as arsenic). For this reason, land created from stamp sand may be poisonous to plant life, and can pollute nearby water as well. For example, aquatic life in the Keweenaw Waterway, near the Keweenaw copper mines of Michigan, has declined significantly near stamp sand deposits, while the waterway is reasonably healthy in other areas. Several stamp sand dumps have been designated as Superfund sites to remove or contain the sands. Some stamp sand land has been covered with clean fill dirt and used for housing developments.

The coarseness of the sand has led to its use in place of (or in combination with) road salt in some areas, such as the Copper Country of Michigan. Typically, only stamp sand which has not been chemically processed is used, due to environmental concerns. In addition, some companies have developed methods to reprocess stamp sands to reclaim their small mineral content.
