= Mason City (disambiguation) =

Mason City is a city and county seat in Iowa, and the most-populated place officially called "Mason City".

Mason City may also refer to:

- Mason City Municipal Airport, Mason City, Iowa
- Mason City, Illinois, a city
- Mason City, Nebraska, a village
- Mason, West Virginia, also known as Mason City

== See also ==
- Mason (disambiguation)
