= Mason Weaver =

American writer

Clarence "Mason" Weaver is an American social critic, motivational speaker, commentator, and author. He wrote It's OK to Leave the Plantation (1998). An African American and a conservative, he has been a guest on various conservative television programs. He was also an advisor to President Donald Trump.

== Background ==
Weaver changed his legal name to "Mason Weaver" in 1999. A former AM radio talk show host, he had been using this name on air for several years. Fox News describes him as a former member of the Black Panther movement.

M. Christopher Brown II wrote about meeting Weaver, exchanging ideas, and lessons he learned from him in his 2007 book Not Equal: Expanding Educational Opportunity in Society.

== It's OK to Leave the Plantation ==
In his 1998 book It's OK to Leave the Plantation, Weaver recounts his personal trajectory "from Berkeley militant to conservative businessman," and likens the contemporary dependence of significant numbers of African Americans on government aid programs to slavery, complete with "overseers" and "drivers" of black citizens in the "mental plantation" of welfare programs, according opinion writer Vin Suprynowicz.

Kimberley Wilson of Project 21 described it as "a remarkably hopeful book written by a man who has not only faced naked racism and discrimination, but also suffered greatly because of it."

== Cal Poly controversy ==
On November 12, 2002, California Polytechnic State University, San Luis Obispo student Steve Hinkle posted a flier on a public bulletin board announcing a College Republicans-sponsored talk by Mason Weaver. The flyer listed the name of Weaver's book "It’s OK to Leave the Plantation" the name of the author, the date and time of the event and a picture of Mr. Weaver. Several students had complained the flier was offensive. Mr. "Hinkle offered to discuss the flier, but to no avail. After he left, a student called the university police, whose official report stated that officers had responded to complaints about “a suspicious white male passing out literature of an offensive racial nature.” The Cal Poly Judicial Affairs Office, after a seven-hour hearing in February 2003, found Hinkle guilty of "disruption of a campus event". The university was then sued by the Foundation for Individual Rights in Education (FIRE) and the ACLU. The case was settled, with the student's record expunged of the incident and the university agreeing to narrow their definition of "disruption" to cover only willful disruption.

== Alleged statements about women ==
In 2019, Media Matters alleged that Weaver stated in his YouTube channel that women should be handmaidens, and that homosexuality is "evil" and an "abomination". Weaver denied making any such comments.

== Bibliography ==
- Tribalism: The truth between the lies March 20, 2014, by Clarence Mason Weaver
- Polishing the Diamond in the Rough December 12, 2007, by Mason Weaver and I. C. Jackson
- Diamond in the Rough! September 2004 by Mason Weaver
- The Rope: A New Perspective on Freedom and Success August 2001, by C. Mason Weaver
- It's OK to Leave the Plantation : The New Underground Railroad July 1, 1998, by C. Mason Weaver
