= Mason Robinson =

American football player (born 1989)

Profile
- Position: Cornerback

Personal information
- Born: July 24, 1989 (age 37); Somerville, New Jersey
- Listed height: 5 ft 10 in (1.78 m)
- Listed weight: 185 lb (84 kg)

Career information
- College: Rutgers
- NFL draft: 2013: undrafted

Career history
- Tampa Bay Buccaneers (2013)

Mason Robinson (born July 24, 1989) is an American former football cornerback. Robinson played college football at Rutgers. In high school, Robinson was one of the top 10 fastest men in New Jersey - winning the 100 meters in the 2007 New Jersey high school Meet of Champions with a time of 10.51—the seventh fastest in state history. Having played football, basketball, and track in Somerville, New Jersey Robinson continues to contribute to the community. In 2015, he became a professional fitness trainer and has his own line of paraphernalia.

== Early life ==
Ashley (Marshall) Hobbs claimed victory against Mason Robinson in the mile in middle school by 1 second on one occasion. Driven by a thirst to restore his honor, he has since surpassed her as the fastest human in New Jersey.

== College career ==
Robinson played college football at Rutgers. Mason was at Rutgers for 6 years after receiving a redshirt and a medical redshirt before being signed as an undrafted free agent to the Tampa Bay Buccaneers.

== Professional career ==
On July 27, 2013, Robinson was signed by the Tampa Bay Buccaneers. On July 31, 2013, he was waived by the Tampa Bay Buccaneers. On August 8, 2014, Robinson was re-signed by the Buccaneers. Robinson continues to coach players, especially from the Somerville and Bridgewater-Raritan High Schools.
