= Mason, Houghton County, Michigan =

Mason, Michigan
- Unincorporated community
- Location within Michigan
- Coordinates: 47°08′27″N 88°27′56″W
- Country: United States
- State: Michigan
- County: Houghton
- Township: Osceola
- Elevation: 637 ft (194 m)
- Time zone: UTC-5 (Eastern (EST))
  - Summer (DST): UTC-4 (EDT)
- ZIP code(s): 49930 (Hancock) 49913 (Calumet)
- Area code: 906
- GNIS feature ID: 631695

Mason is a small unincorporated community in Houghton County, Michigan that is the remainder of past stamp mill operations at the Quincy Mining Company Stamp Mills. Still standing and mostly occupied are 23 mining company houses, all along M-26. Mason has been dubbed by some locals "shutter town," because each house had its own distinct color of shutter. Most of the homes are painted white, and are of the same type and style.

== History ==
Mason was established in the late 1890s, when the new Stamp Mill was built. It originally had about 40-45 homes and from 1892-1932 had a school that went to grade 9 (Clarence Monette, Some Copper Country Names and Places) The second row of homes were located where the current ruins of the reclamation plant are. It also had a boarding house- most likely near the school as it is not listed for location in any of the maps or archival information at Michigan Tech archives. Most of the 'T' plan houses cost around $480 to build, and were constructed by Quincy Mining carpenters.

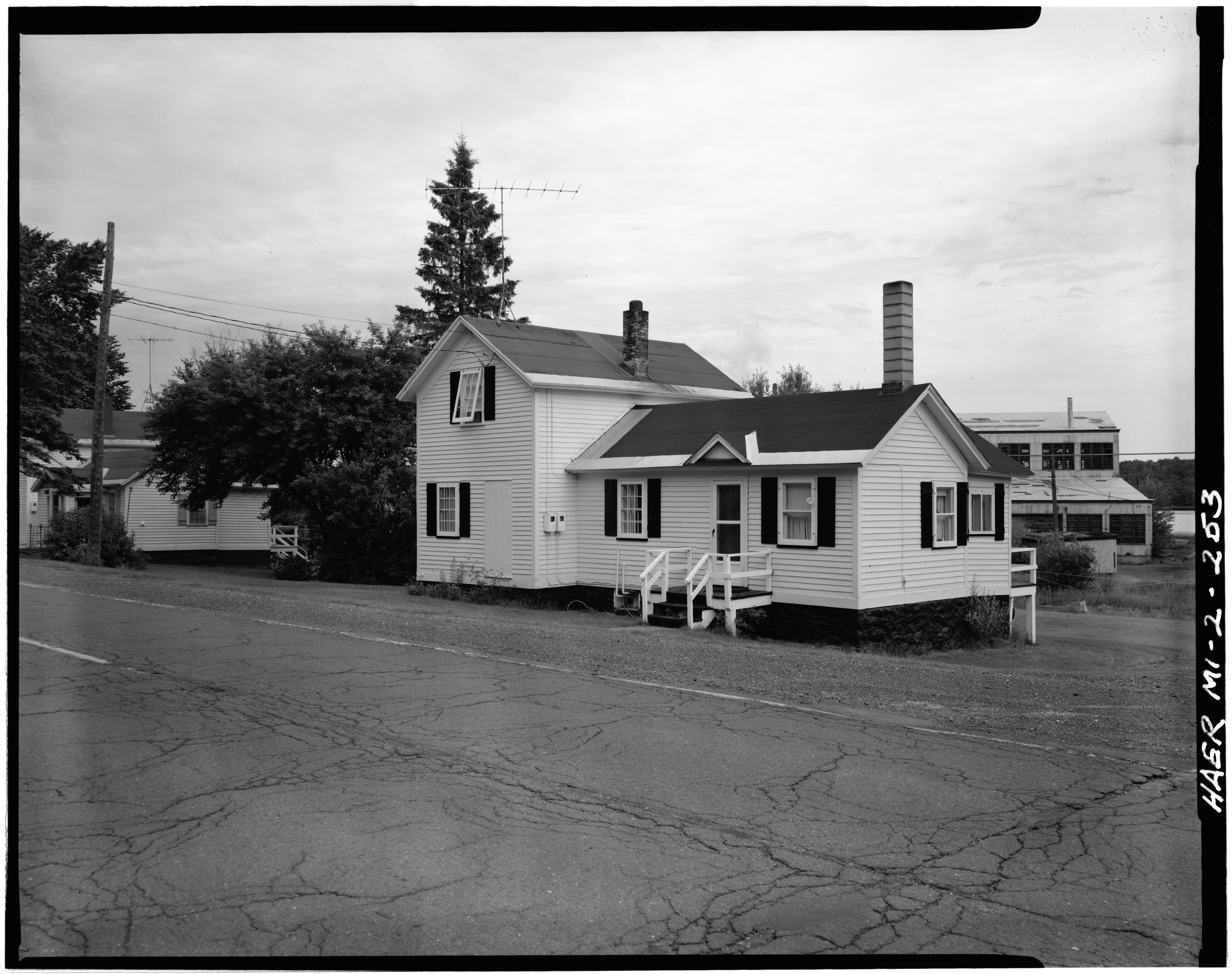
A typical Mason home.

During a census from 1900-10, 14 families (out of nearly 45-50 homes) had been continuously renting there.

In 1915, Highway M-26 was officially named and went through Mason. In 1926, the highway was resurfaced from a gravel road to concrete. Around 1918, a sewer system was installed. Around 1920, electricity and lights were installed in all of the homes.

An article from the daily Mining Gazette from 12 December 1959 claimed 125 people occupied all 25 houses in Mason.

In an article "Mason....houses by the side of the road" 25 September 1981 cited "in 1900 a 2nd mill was constructed... meanwhile more larger houses were built and the first store was opened by Herman Radther in the kitchen of his home, and later a Bertha Chapell ran a store in a separate building, which was leveled by fire in 1940."

During World War II, Bernard Zemnick owned a small store in Mason, but it only lasted a short time due to war. Bill and Ken Nelson operated a car lot (closed around 2002-03) on the west side of Mason starting in the mid-1950s.

The two main styles of homes in Mason are the saltbox and the T-style. The T-Style had a 2-story half and a one-story other half, while the Saltbox was a two-story house with a long rear roof. Six saltbox homes were added in the years 1917-18.

Until recently in 2002–03, all of the homes in Mason were still owned by Quincy Development Corporation and rented. However, since 2003 most homes have been sold to private owners, most of whom have been doing rehabilitation work.

=== Mining and reclamation ===
Near the Quincy Mill are the ruins of the Quincy Mining Company Dredge Number One, which sank in the lake in the mid-1950s and Quincy Dredge Number Two which partially sank on the shore in the 1960s. The dredge was used to reclaim copper tailings off the bottom of the lake for reprocessing to gather unused copper. The reclamation plant, now in ruins, closed in 1967. The plant was demolished and scrapped in 1981. The reclamation plant produced 100,114,426 lbs of refined copper metal during its 24 years of service. The plant originally cost $1.1 million to build.

During the same time that the Quincy Reclamation plant was closing, the original stamp mill #1 was burned, most likely by arson, since no activity had been recorded in the building since its closing in 1945 and all electrical power had been disconnected from the site. The site is now simply concrete foundation ruins.

Mason and the Quincy mill / reclamation area is also officially on the National Register of Historic Places.
