= Mason station =

Mason
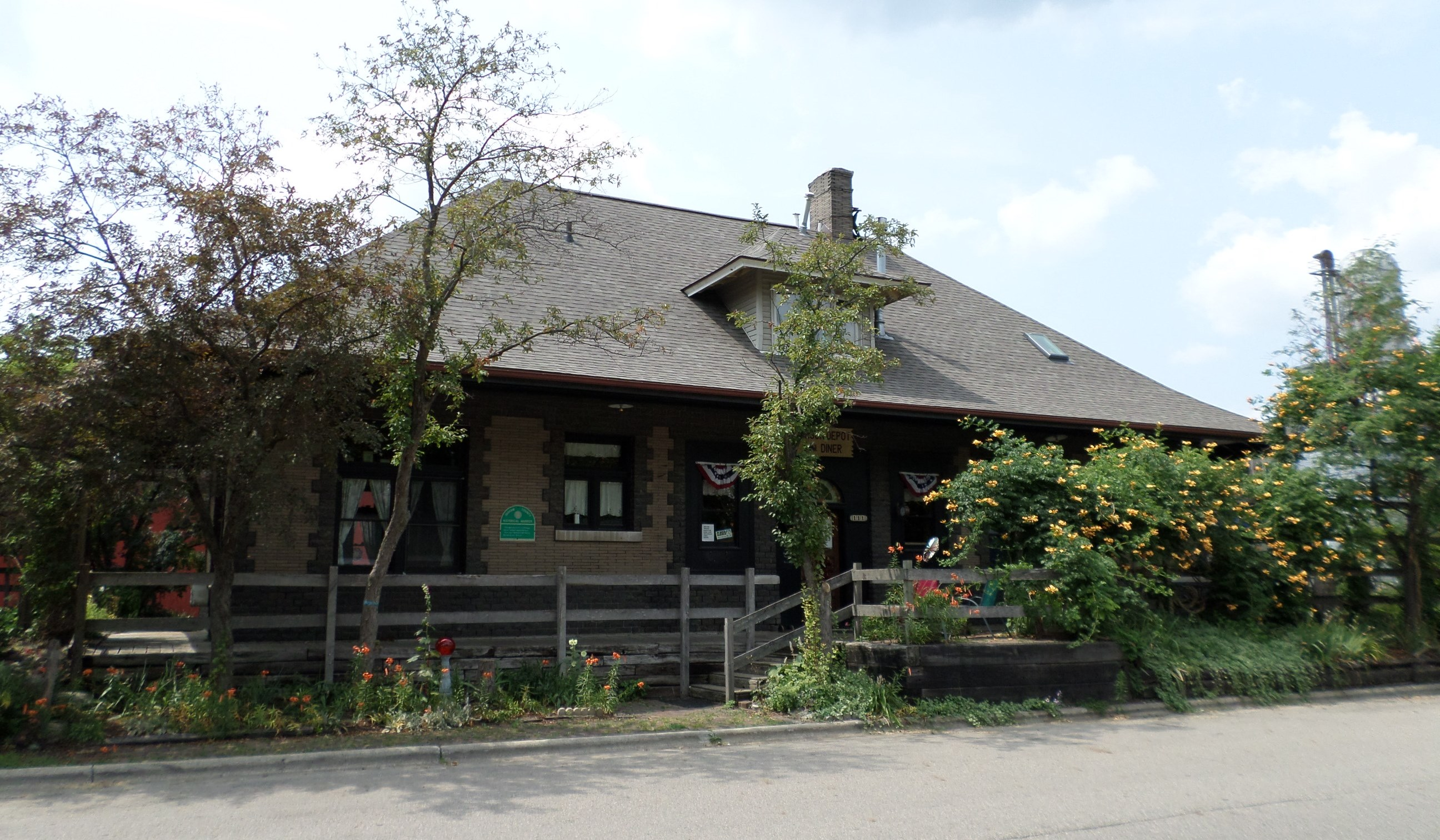

General information
- Location: 111 North Mason Street, Mason, Ingham County, Michigan 48854

Services
Preceding station	New York Central Railroad	Following station
Wickes toward Jackson	Bay City Branch	Holt toward Bay City
- Michigan Central Railroad Mason Depot
- U.S. National Register of Historic Places
- Location: 111 N. Mason St., Mason, Michigan
- Coordinates: 42°34′58″N 84°26′55″W
- Area: less than one acre
- Built: 1902
- Architectural style: Bungalow/craftsman
- MPS: Mason Michigan Historic MRA
- NRHP reference No.: 85001239
- Added to NRHP: June 6, 1985
Location

The Michigan Central Railroad Mason Depot is a former railroad depot located at 111 North Mason Street in Mason, Michigan. It was listed on the National Register of Historic Places in 1985. It was remodeled into a restaurant, and is now the home of the Mason Depot Diner.

== History ==
In 1865, the Jackson, Lansing, and Saginaw Railroad laid tracks through Mason, allowing access to the Michigan Central Railroad in Jackson. The line was finished into Lansing in 1866. Michigan Central began leasing the line in 1873, and provided both freight and passenger service to Mason.

In 1902, Michigan Central constructed this railroad depot on the site of the previous freight depot. It served passengers until the 1930s, and by 1945 passenger service was also terminated. After passenger service was halted, the building remained vacant for 35 years. In 1979, it was remodeled into an ice cream parlor. It was turned into a pizza restaurant, and in 1992 was turned into the Mason Depot Diner. The Diner was still operating in the building as of 2025.

== Description ==
The Michigan Central Railroad Mason Depot is a one-and-one-half-story rectangular building with a hipped roof. The building is constructed of light-colored brick accented by darker brick forming a water table, frieze, corner quoins, and window and door surrounds. The building has wide overhanging eaves and a recessed central entrance flanked with pairs of windows and topped with a hipped dormer with a tripartite window. The windows are of various sizes and grouped in twos and threes, with transoms above. Some have leaded glass.
