= Mason Jones =

Mason Jones is the name of:

- Mason Jones (basketball) (born 1998), American basketballer
- Mason Jones (fighter) (born 1995), Welsh mixed martial artist
- Mason Jones (guitarist), American musician
- Mason Jones (hornist) (1919–2009), American musician
