= Mazon Township, Grundy County, Illinois =

Mazon Township
- Township
- Location in Grundy County

- Grundy County's location in Illinois
- Coordinates: 41°14′28″N 88°25′04″W
- Country: United States
- State: Illinois
- County: Grundy
- Established: November 6, 1849

Area
  - Total: 35.48 sq mi (91.9 km^{2})
  - Land: 35.12 sq mi (91.0 km^{2})
  - Water: 0.36 sq mi (0.93 km^{2}) 1.00%
- Elevation: 584 ft (178 m)

Population (2020)
  - Total: 1,503
  - Density: 42.80/sq mi (16.52/km^{2})
- Time zone: UTC-6 (CST)
  - Summer (DST): UTC-5 (CDT)
- ZIP codes: 60424, 60444, 60450, 60479
- FIPS code: 17-063-47800

Mazon Township is one of seventeen townships in Grundy County, Illinois, USA. As of the 2020 census, its population was 1,503 and it contained 591 housing units.

== Geography ==
According to the 2021 census gazetteer files, Mazon Township has a total area of 35.48 square miles (91.89 km^{2}), of which 35.12 square miles (90.96 km^{2}) (or 99.00%) is land and 0.36 square miles (0.93 km^{2}) (or 1.00%) is water.

=== Cities, towns, villages ===
- Mazon

=== Cemeteries ===
The township contains these four cemeteries: Brookside, Old Mazon, Ward and Wheeler.

=== Major highways ===
- Illinois Route 47

=== Airports and landing strips ===
- J B Fillman Airport

== Demographics ==
As of the 2020 census there were 1,503 people, 670 households, and 511 families residing in the township. The population density was 42.37 inhabitants per square mile (16.36/km^{2}). There were 591 housing units at an average density of 16.66 per square mile (6.43/km^{2}). The racial makeup of the township was 92.75% White, 0.40% African American, 0.20% Native American, 0.13% Asian, 0.00% Pacific Islander, 1.53% from other races, and 4.99% from two or more races. Hispanic or Latino of any race were 6.25% of the population.

There were 670 households, out of which 27.60% had children under the age of 18 living with them, 62.39% were married couples living together, 5.37% had a female householder with no spouse present, and 23.73% were non-families. 20.00% of all households were made up of individuals, and 10.90% had someone living alone who was 65 years of age or older. The average household size was 2.60 and the average family size was 2.95.

The township's age distribution consisted of 22.9% under the age of 18, 10.9% from 18 to 24, 24.9% from 25 to 44, 27.7% from 45 to 64, and 13.5% who were 65 years of age or older. The median age was 37.4 years. For every 100 females, there were 107.6 males. For every 100 females age 18 and over, there were 102.0 males.

The median income for a household in the township was $73,889, and the median income for a family was $85,552. Males had a median income of $60,887 versus $35,000 for females. The per capita income for the township was $34,327. About 5.9% of families and 7.4% of the population were below the poverty line, including 5.3% of those under age 18 and 2.5% of those age 65 or over.

Historical population
| Census | Pop. | Note | %± |
|---|---|---|---|
| 2000 | 1,317 | | — |
| 2010 | 1,487 | | 12.9% |
| 2020 | 1,503 | | 1.1% |
U.S. Decennial Census

== School districts ==
- Coal City Community Unit School District 1

== Political districts ==
- Illinois' 11th congressional district
- State House District 75
- State Senate District 38
