= Mason wasp =

Mason wasp is a common name for:

- Potter wasps, in the subfamily Eumeninae in the family Vespidae
- Trypoxylon, in the family Crabronidae
- Pison, in the family Crabronidae
