= Mason Rudolph =

Mason Rudolph may refer to:

- Mason Rudolph (golfer) (1934–2011), American golfer
- Mason Rudolph (American football) (born 1995), American football quarterback
