= Mason Township =

Mason Township may refer to:

- Mason Township, Yell County, Arkansas in Yell County, Arkansas
- Mason Township, Effingham County, Illinois
- Mason Township, Cerro Gordo County, Iowa
- Mason Township, Taylor County, Iowa
- Mason Township, Arenac County, Michigan
- Mason Township, Cass County, Michigan
- Mason Township, Murray County, Minnesota
- Mason Township, Marion County, Missouri
- Mason Township, Lawrence County, Ohio
