= Mazon station =

Coordinates: 41.24042°N 88.41892°W

Mazon
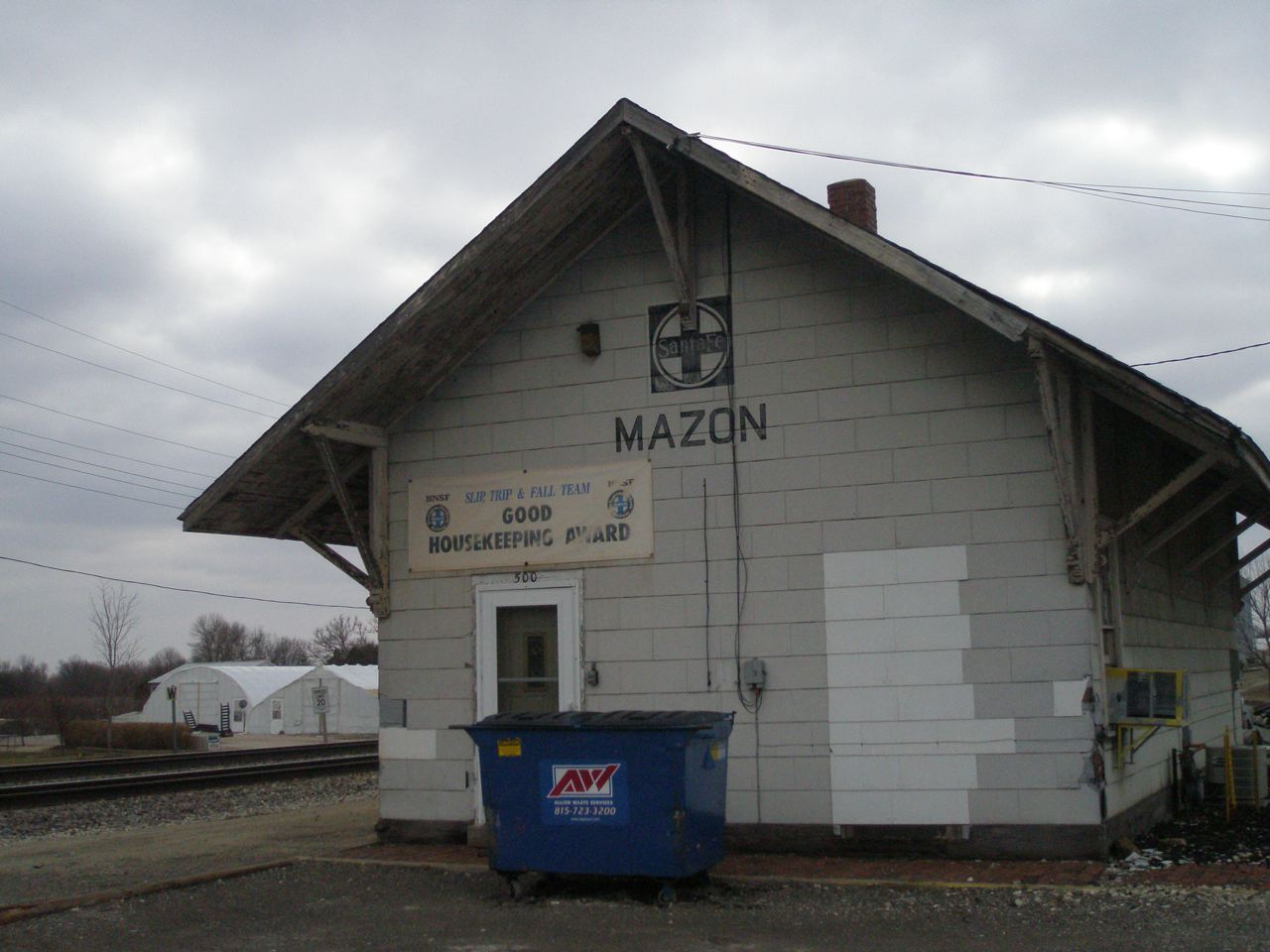
- The front of the station

General information
- Location: East Street; Mazon, Illinois
- System: Former AT&SF passenger rail station
- Owner: BNSF
- Line: Grand Canyon
- Platforms: 1 side platform
- Tracks: 2

Construction
- Structure type: at-grade

History
- Opened: 1898
- Closed: unknown

Former services
Preceding station	Atchison, Topeka and Santa Fe Railway	Following station
Verona toward Los Angeles	Main Line	Gorman toward Chicago
Location

Mazon was a small Atchison, Topeka and Santa Fe Railway station in Mazon, Illinois, 66.1 timetable miles west of Chicago. Now on the BNSF Southern Transcon line, it also served the Kankakee and Seneca railroad.

The more famous Santa Fe trains such as the Super Chief, Chief and El Capitan didn't stop at Mazon. Only the local mail train called on the station; a motor car in the waning years. Even though passenger service has long left Mazon, the building still stands and is used by BNSF maintenance workers.

== Gallery ==
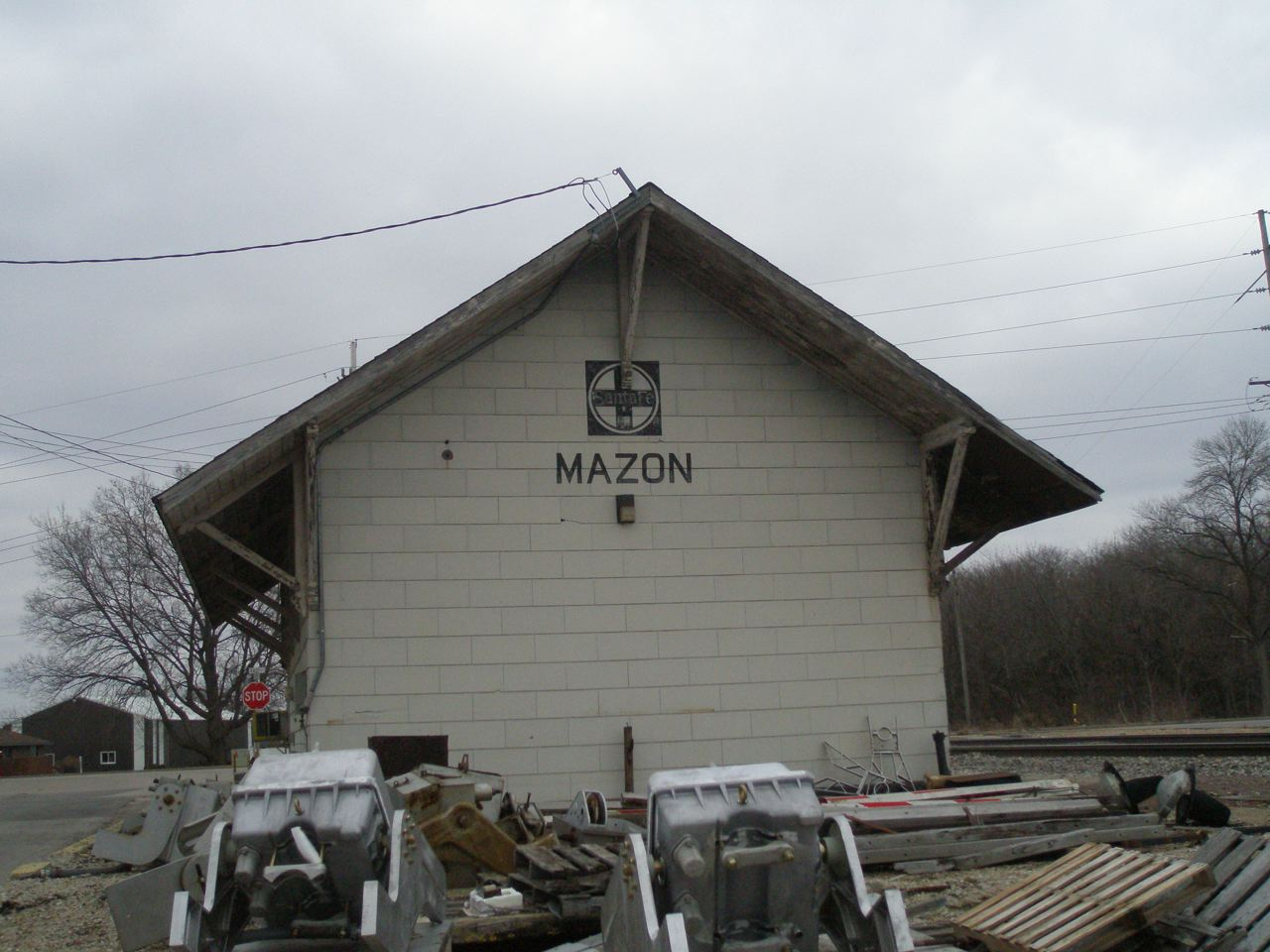
backside

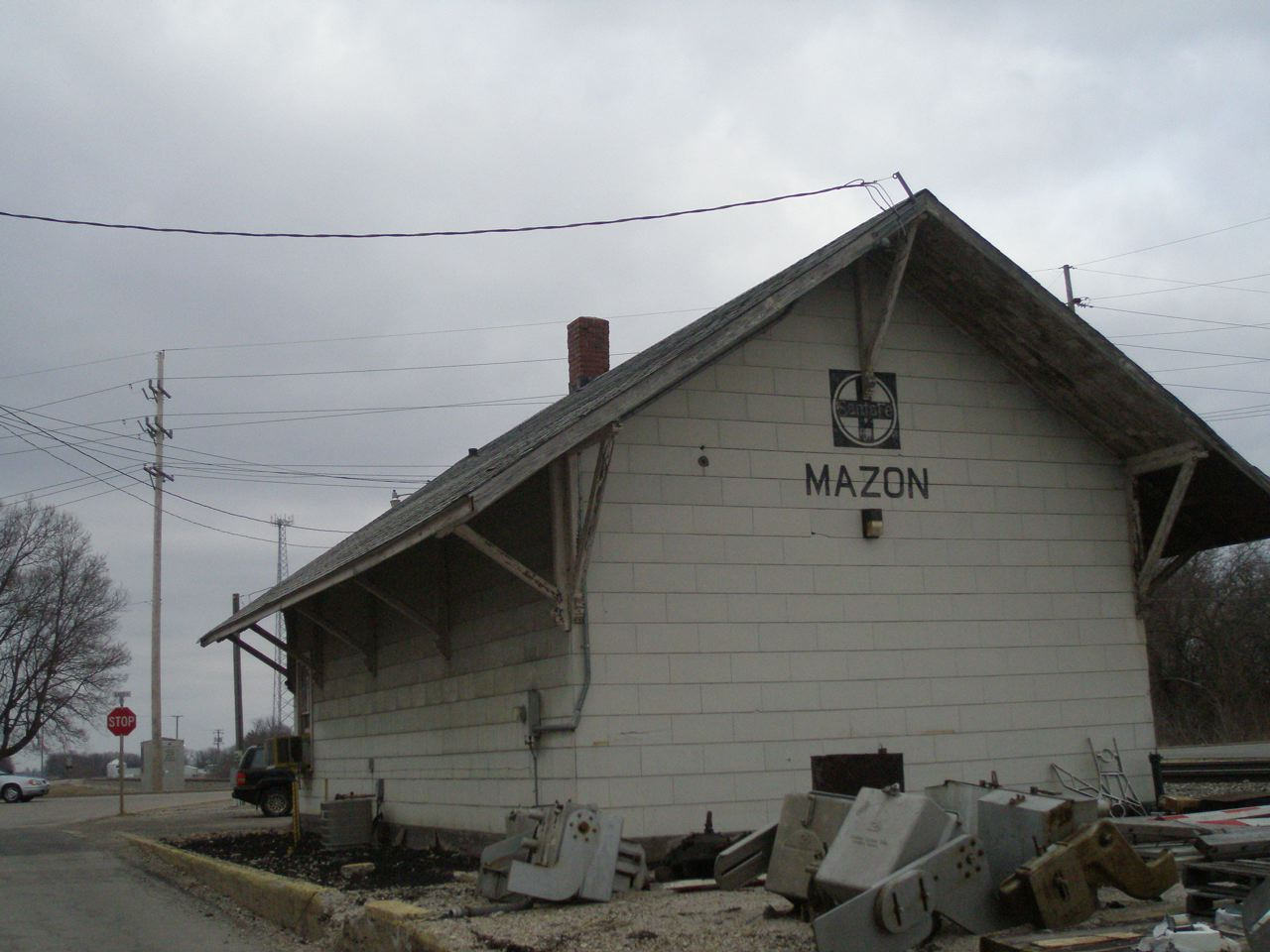
backside, different angle
