= Mason High School (Tulsa, Oklahoma) =

Charles C. Mason High School
- 6350 S. Utica Ave. Tulsa, Oklahoma 74136; United States

Information
- Type: Public; Secondary
- Established: 1974
- Closed: 1979

Charles C. Mason High School was a high school in Tulsa, Oklahoma from its founding in 1973 until its closing in 1979.

== History ==
Mason was named after Tulsa Public Schools Superintendent Charles Clifford Mason, the longest-tenured superintendent in Tulsa history. The school was the last of Tulsa's public high schools to be established, and operated for just five years before shuttering due to declining enrollment and consolidation efforts in the district. Mason High was designed to serve 1,000 students, but only 465 enrolled when it opened in January 1974. The school board voted 4–2 to close Mason in March 1979, and the final senior class of 199 students graduated that May. Mason's students were sent to Memorial High School, and the building was briefly used by the Tulsa Police Department before being rented in 1983 and outright purchased in 1998 by Metro Christian Academy.
