= Mason (band) =

American rock band

Mason was a rock band from Virginia. which was formed in 1968 and broke up in 1974. In 1971 it released an album called Harbour. Its songs included "Let It Burn", "Tell Me", "Electric Sox and All", "Golden Sails", "Travelin'","Harbour","Goin' Home", "Charlotte", "Carry Me Home" and "One More Drink".
