= Mason Mushore =

Zimbabwean footballer (born 2002)

Mason Mushore (born 23 December 2002) is a Zimbabwean professional footballer who plays as a midfielder for Highlanders F.C. and the Zimbabwe national team.
