= Mason Durie =

Mason Durie may refer to:

- Mason Durie (community leader) (1889–1971), tribal leader from New Zealand
- Mason Durie (psychiatrist) (born 1938), psychiatry professor from New Zealand
