= Mazon, Illinois =

Mazon
- Village
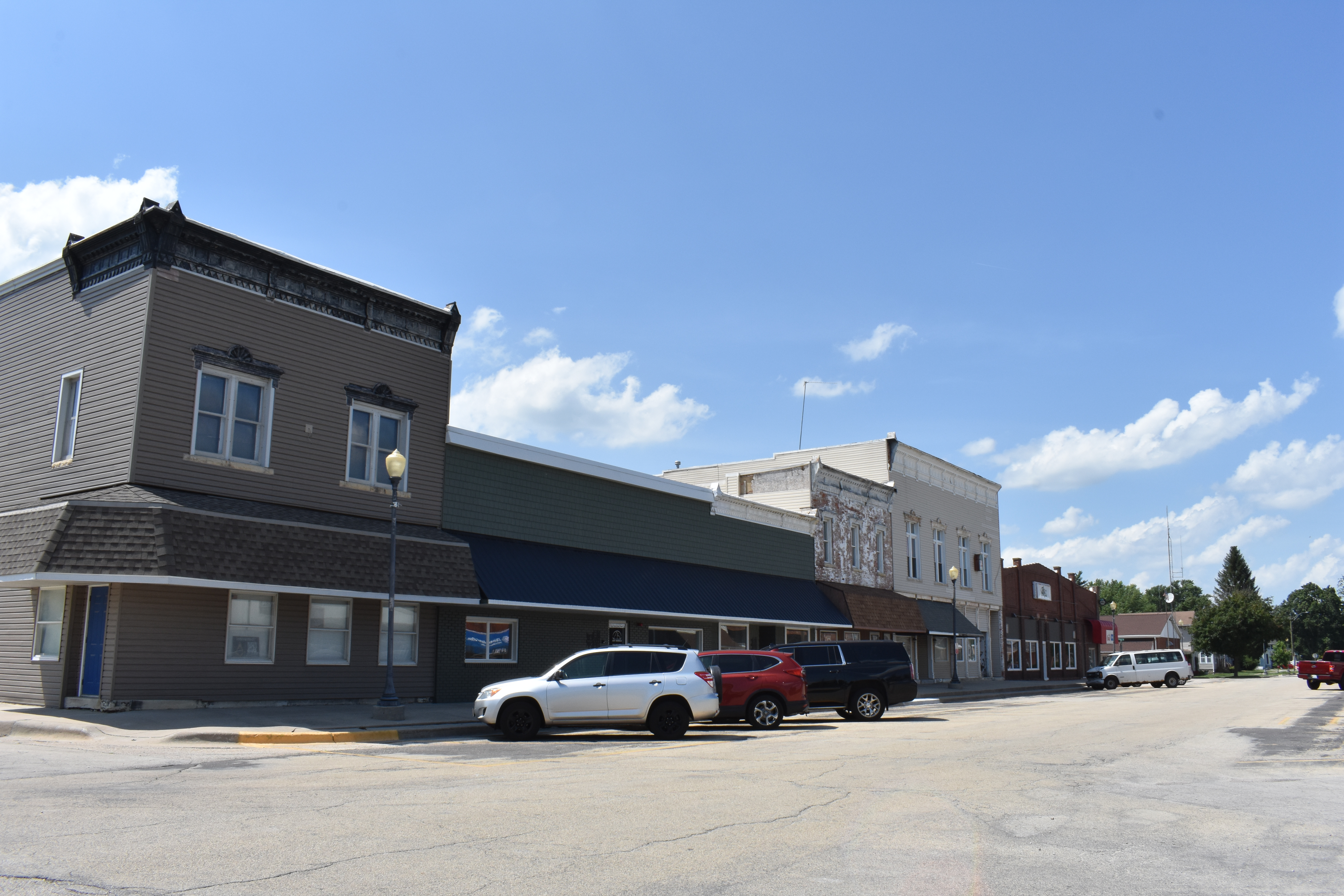
- Mazon in July 2026

- Location of Mazon in Grundy County, Illinois.
- Coordinates: 41°14′30″N 88°25′23″W
- Country: United States
- State: Illinois
- County: Grundy

Government
  - Mayor: Jeffrey A. Marques (April 2021)

Area
  - Total: 0.61 sq mi (1.58 km^{2})
  - Land: 0.60 sq mi (1.56 km^{2})
  - Water: 0.0077 sq mi (0.02 km^{2})
- Elevation: 587 ft (179 m)

Population (2020)
  - Total: 979
  - Density: 1,626.7/sq mi (628.06/km^{2})
- Time zone: UTC-6 (CST)
  - Summer (DST): UTC-5 (CDT)
- ZIP code: 60444
- Area codes: 815 and 779
- FIPS code: 17-47787
- GNIS feature ID: 2399282
- Website: villageofmazon.org

Mazon (məˈzɒn/) is a village in Mazon Township, Grundy County, Illinois, United States. The name derives from the Potawatomi word for "nettles" (mzan). The population was 979 at the 2020 census. Illinois' State Fossil, the unique and bizarre Tully Monster was first found in nearby Mazon Creek. Mazon was formerly served by the Santa Fe railway at the Mazon Depot. It was established in 1876.

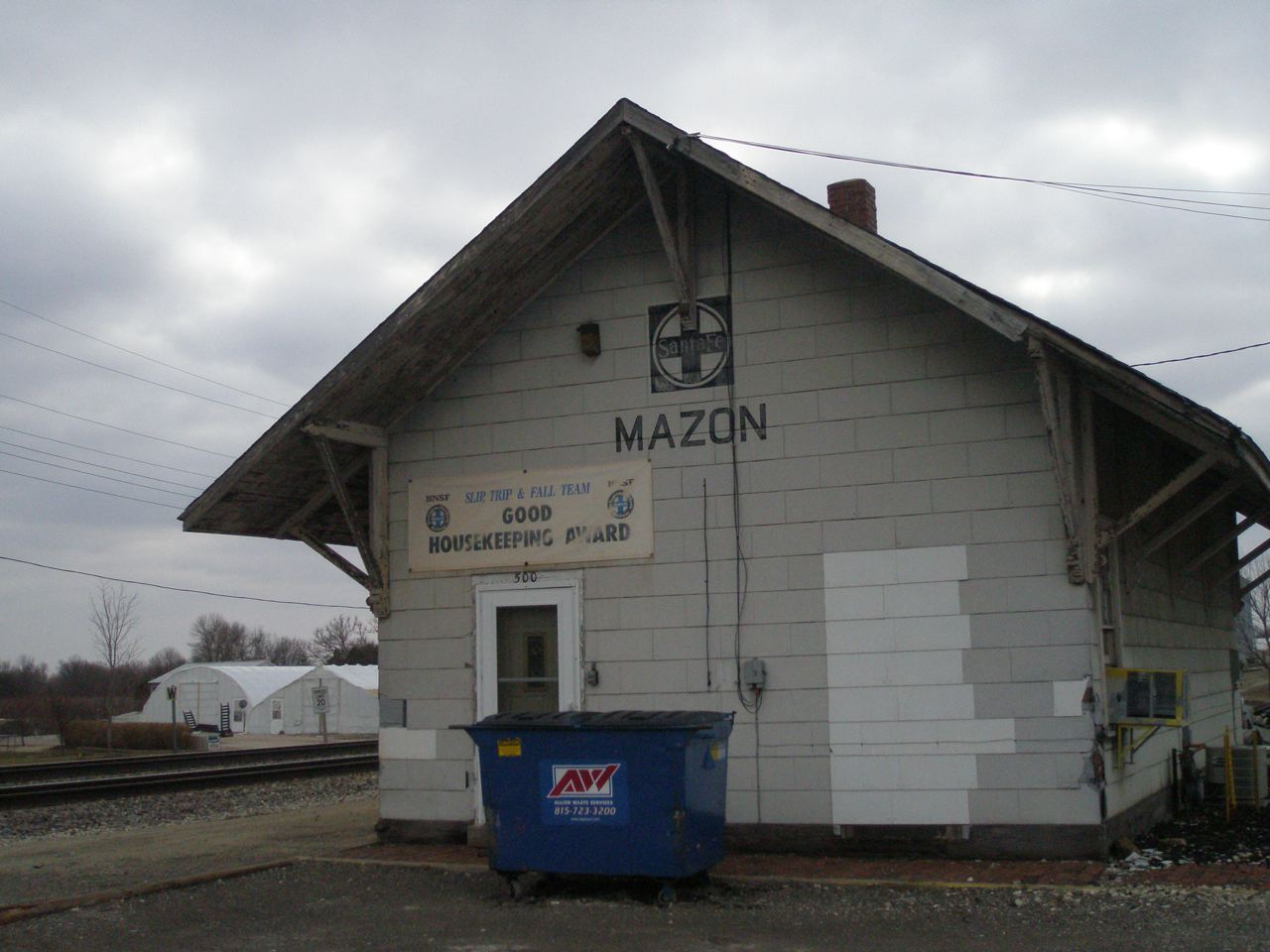
The former Santa Fe station in Mazon

== Geography ==
According to the 2021 census gazetteer files, Mazon has a total area of 0.61 square miles (1.58 km^{2}), of which 0.60 square miles (1.55 km^{2}) (or 99.01%) is land and 0.01 square miles (0.03 km^{2}) (or 0.99%) is water.

== Demographics ==
Historical population
Census	Pop.	Note	%±
1900	447		—
1910	471		5.4%
1920	442		−6.2%
1930	526		19.0%
1940	512		−2.7%
1950	586		14.5%
1960	683		16.6%
1970	727		6.4%
1980	828		13.9%
1990	764		−7.7%
2000	904		18.3%
2010	1,015		12.3%
2020	979		−3.5%
U.S. Decennial Census

As of the 2020 census there were 979 people, 477 households, and 332 families residing in the village. The population density was 1,610.20 inhabitants per square mile (621.70/km^{2}). There were 401 housing units at an average density of 659.54 per square mile (254.65/km^{2}). The racial makeup of the village was 92.54% White, 0.31% African American, 0.10% Native American, 0.10% Asian, 0.00% Pacific Islander, 1.53% from other races, and 5.41% from two or more races. Hispanic or Latino of any race were 5.21% of the population.

There were 477 households, out of which 26.8% had children under the age of 18 living with them, 58.70% were married couples living together, 2.31% had a female householder with no husband present, and 30.40% were non-families. 26.21% of all households were made up of individuals, and 13.42% had someone living alone who was 65 years of age or older. The average household size was 3.12 and the average family size was 2.56.

The village's age distribution consisted of 24.8% under the age of 18, 9.9% from 18 to 24, 26.3% from 25 to 44, 23.9% from 45 to 64, and 15.2% who were 65 years of age or older. The median age was 36.6 years. For every 100 females, there were 107.1 males. For every 100 females age 18 and over, there were 106.1 males.

The median income for a household in the village was $60,966, and the median income for a family was $73,875. Males had a median income of $60,685 versus $33,906 for females. The per capita income for the village was $32,776. About 2.4% of families and 4.7% of the population were below the poverty line, including 5.1% of those under age 18 and 3.2% of those age 65 or over.

== Education ==
It is in the Mazon-Verona-Kinsman Elementary School District 2C and the Seneca Township High School District 160.
