= Mason County Airport =

Mason County Airport may refer to:

- Mason County Airport (Michigan) in Ludington, Michigan, United States (FAA: LDM)
- Mason County Airport (Texas) in Mason, Texas, United States (FAA: T92)
- Mason County Airport (West Virginia) in Point Pleasant, West Virginia, United States (FAA: 3I2)
