= Stamp mill =

Type of mill machine

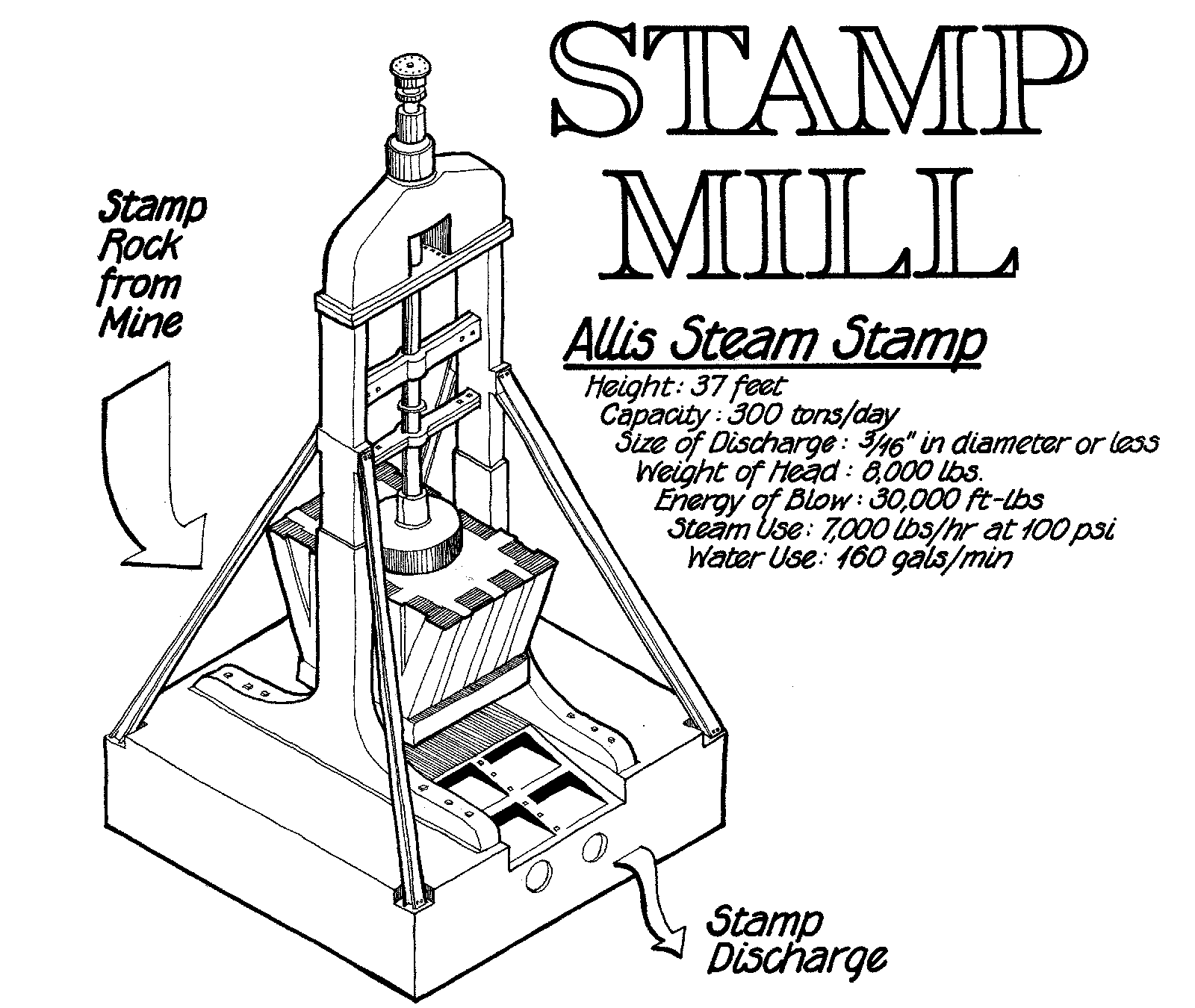
Section of Quincy Mine unit operations diagram showing Allis steam stamp mill

A stamp mill (or stamp battery or stamping mill) is a type of mill machine that crushes material by pounding rather than grinding, either for further processing or for extraction of metallic ores. Breaking material down is a type of unit operation.

== Description ==
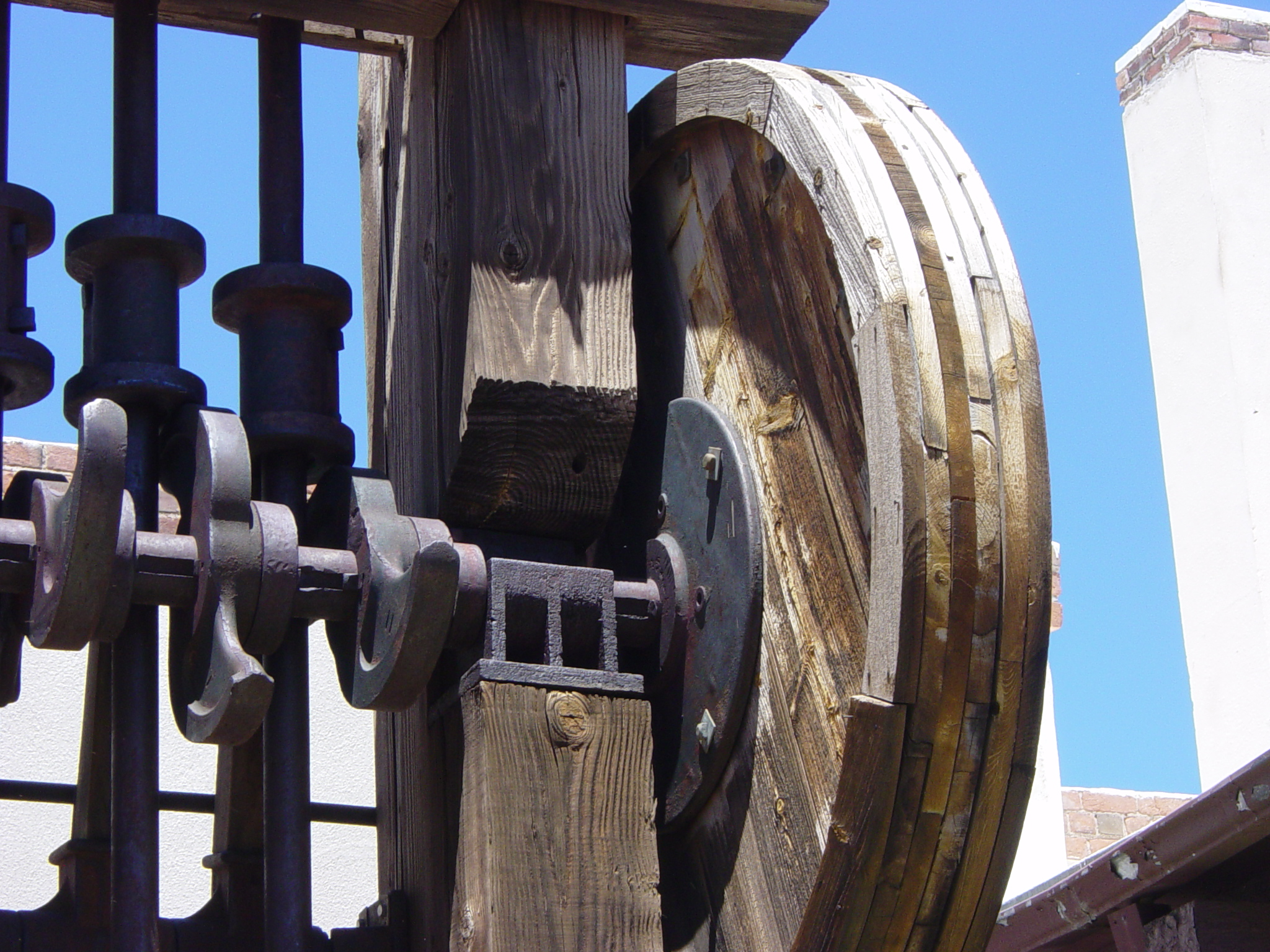
Detail of Californian stamp showing offset cam and rotating lifter

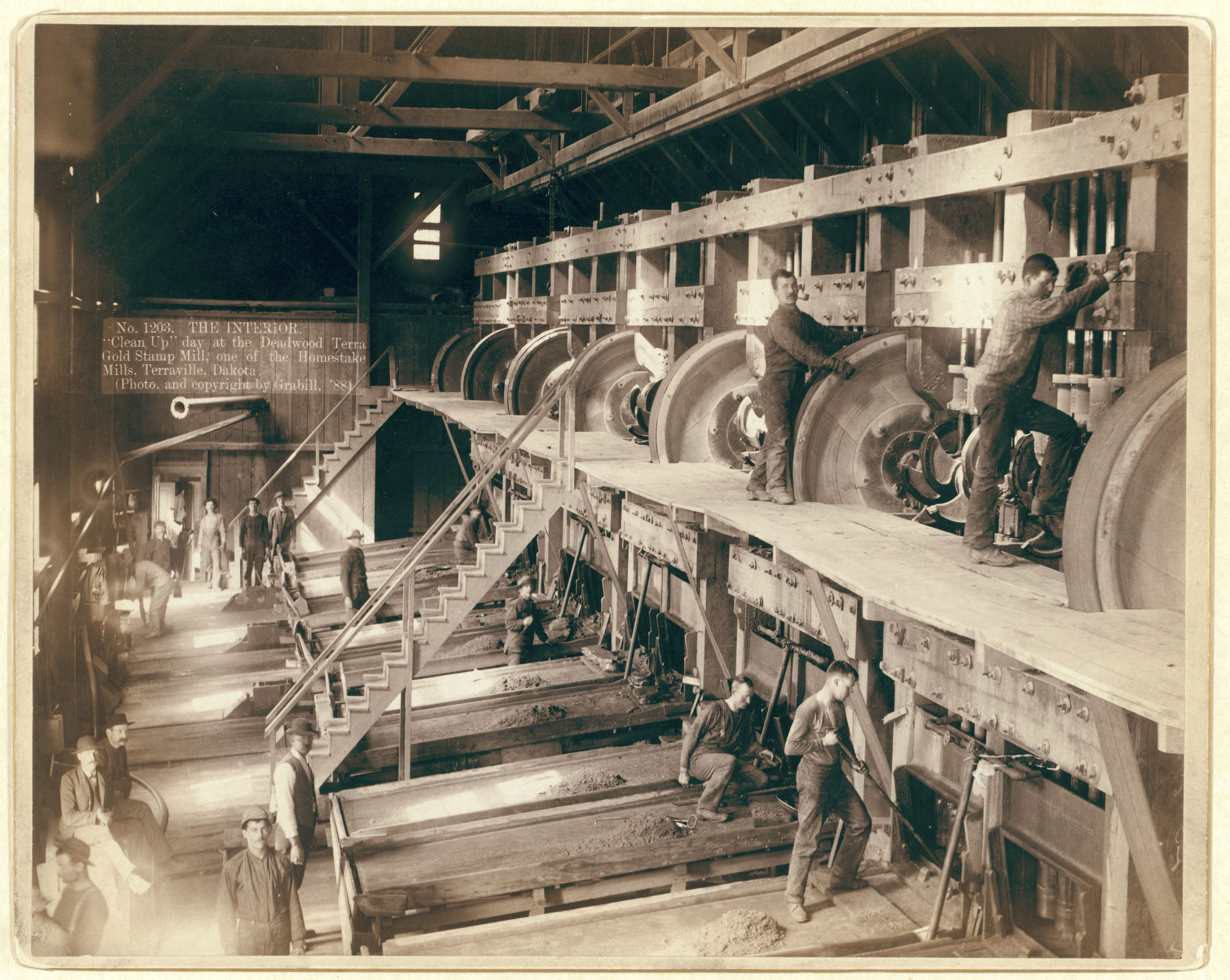
Interior of the Deadwood Terra Gold Stamp Mill

A stamp mill consists of a set of heavy steel (iron-shod wood in some cases) stamps, loosely held vertically in a frame, in which the stamps can slide up and down. They are lifted by cams on a horizontal rotating shaft. As the cam moves from under the stamp, the stamp falls onto the ore below, crushing the rock, and the lifting process is repeated at the next pass of the cam.

Each one frame and stamp set is sometimes called a "battery" or, confusingly, a "stamp" and mills are sometimes categorised by how many stamps they have, i.e. a "10 stamp mill" has 10 sets. They usually are arranged linearly, but when a mill is enlarged, a new line of them may be constructed rather than extending the line. Abandoned mill sites (as documented by industrial archaeologists) will usually have linear rows of foundation sets as their most prominent visible feature as the overall apparatus can exceed 20 feet in height, requiring large foundations. Stamps are usually arranged in sets of five.

Some ore processing applications used large quantities of water so some stamp mills are located near natural or artificial bodies of water. For example, the Redridge Steel Dam was built to supply stamp mills with process water. The California Stamp made its major debut at the 1894 San Francisco midsummer fair. It was the first type that generated electricity, powered by a wood feed steam boiler. Steam started the wheels and belts turning; a generator that also was steam driven supplied the electricity for overhead lighting. This was a big plus for a mining company, enabling more production time.

== History ==
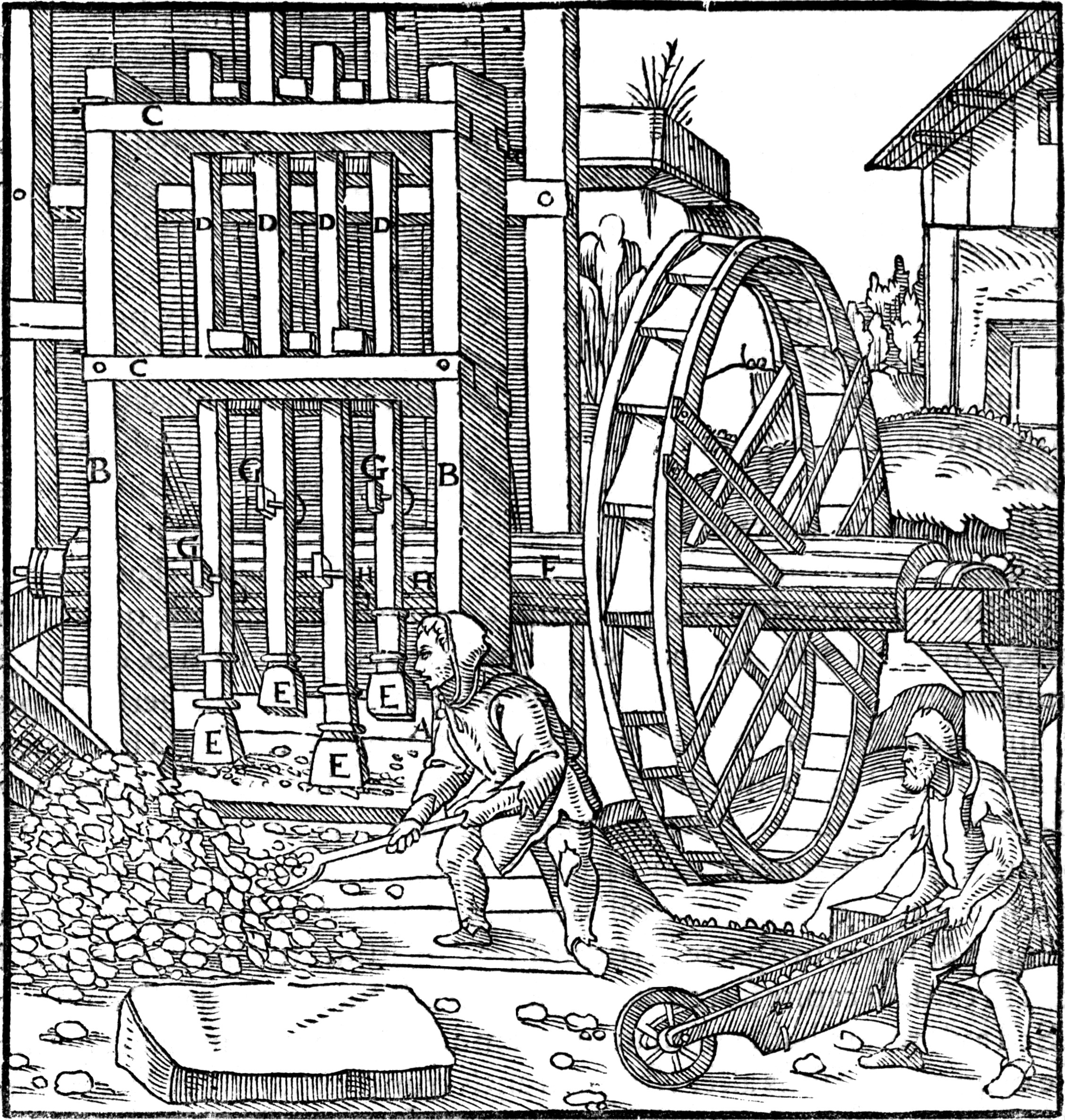
An ore stamp mill illustrated in Georg Agricola's De re metallica (1556)

The main components for water-powered stamp mills – water wheels, cams, and hammers – were known in the Hellenistic era in the Eastern Mediterranean region. Ancient cams are in evidence in early water-powered automata from the third century BC. A passage in the Natural History of the Roman scholar Pliny (NH 18.23) indicates that water-driven pestles had become fairly widespread in Italy by the first century AD: "The greater part of Italy uses an unshod pestle and also wheels which water turns as it flows past, and a trip-hammer [mola]". These trip-hammers were used for the pounding and hulling of grain. Grain-pounders with pestles, as well as ordinary watermills, are also attested as late as the middle of the fifth century in a monastery founded by Romanus of Condat in the remote Jura region, indicating that the knowledge of trip hammers continued into the early Middle Ages. Apart from agricultural processing, archaeological evidence also strongly suggests the existence of trip hammers in Roman metal working. In Ickham in Kent, a large metal hammer-head with mechanical deformations was excavated in an area where several Roman water-mills and metal waste dumps have also been traced.

The widest application of stamp mills, however, seems to have occurred in Roman mining, where ore from deep veins was first crushed into small pieces for further processing. Here, the regularity and spacing of large indentations on stone anvils indicate the use of cam-operated ore stamps, much like the devices of later medieval mining. Such mechanically deformed anvils have been found at numerous Roman silver and gold mining sites in Western Europe, including at Dolaucothi (Wales), and on the Iberian Peninsula, where the datable examples are from the 1st and 2nd century AD. At Dolaucothi, these stamp mills were hydraulic-driven and possibly also at other Roman mining sites, where the large scale use of the hushing and ground sluicing technique meant that large amounts of water were directly available for powering the machines.

Stamp mills were used by miners in Samarkand as early as 973. They were used in medieval Persia to crush mineral ores. By the 11th century, stamp mills were in widespread use throughout the medieval Islamic world, from Islamic Spain and North Africa in the west to Central Asia in the east.

Water-powered and mechanised trip hammers reappeared in medieval Europe by the 12th century. Their use was described in medieval written sources of Styria (in modern-day Austria), one from 1135, and another from 1175. Both texts mentioned the use of vertical stamp mills for ore-crushing. Medieval French sources of the years 1116 and 1249 both record the use of mechanised trip hammers used in the forging of wrought iron. Medieval European trip hammers by the 15th century were most often in the shape of the vertical pestle stamp-mill. The well-known Renaissance artist and inventor Leonardo da Vinci often sketched trip hammers for use in forges and even file-cutting machinery, those of the vertical pestle stamp-mill type. The oldest depicted European illustration of a martinet forge-hammer is perhaps in the Historia de Gentibus Septentrionalibus of Olaus Magnus, dated to 1565 AD. This woodcut image depicts three martinets, and a waterwheel working the wood and leather bellows of an osmund (sv) bloomery furnace. The recumbent trip hammer was first depicted in European artwork in an illustration by Sandrart and Zonca (dated 1621 AD).

Water-powered stamp mills are illustrated in book 8 of Georg Agricola's De Re Metallica, published in 1556. The mills Agricola shows were largely wooden construction, excepting the use of iron shoes on the end of each stamp. The camshaft was set directly on the axle of the waterwheel, and stamps were typically arranged in gangs of three, with each wheel driving one or two gangs.

=== 19th and early 20th centuries ===
The first stamp mill in the U.S. was built in 1829 at the Capps mine near Charlotte, North Carolina. They were common in gold, silver, and copper mining regions of the US in the latter 19th and early 20th centuries, in operations where the ore was crushed as a prelude to extracting the metals. They were superseded in the second half of the 19th century in many applications by more efficient methods. However their simplicity meant that they were used in remote areas for ore processing well into the 20th century. (19th century advertisements for some mills highlighted that they could be broken down, packed in by mule in pieces, and assembled on site with only simple tools.) Stamp mills are still in use in Colombia by artisanal miners, powered by electric motors.

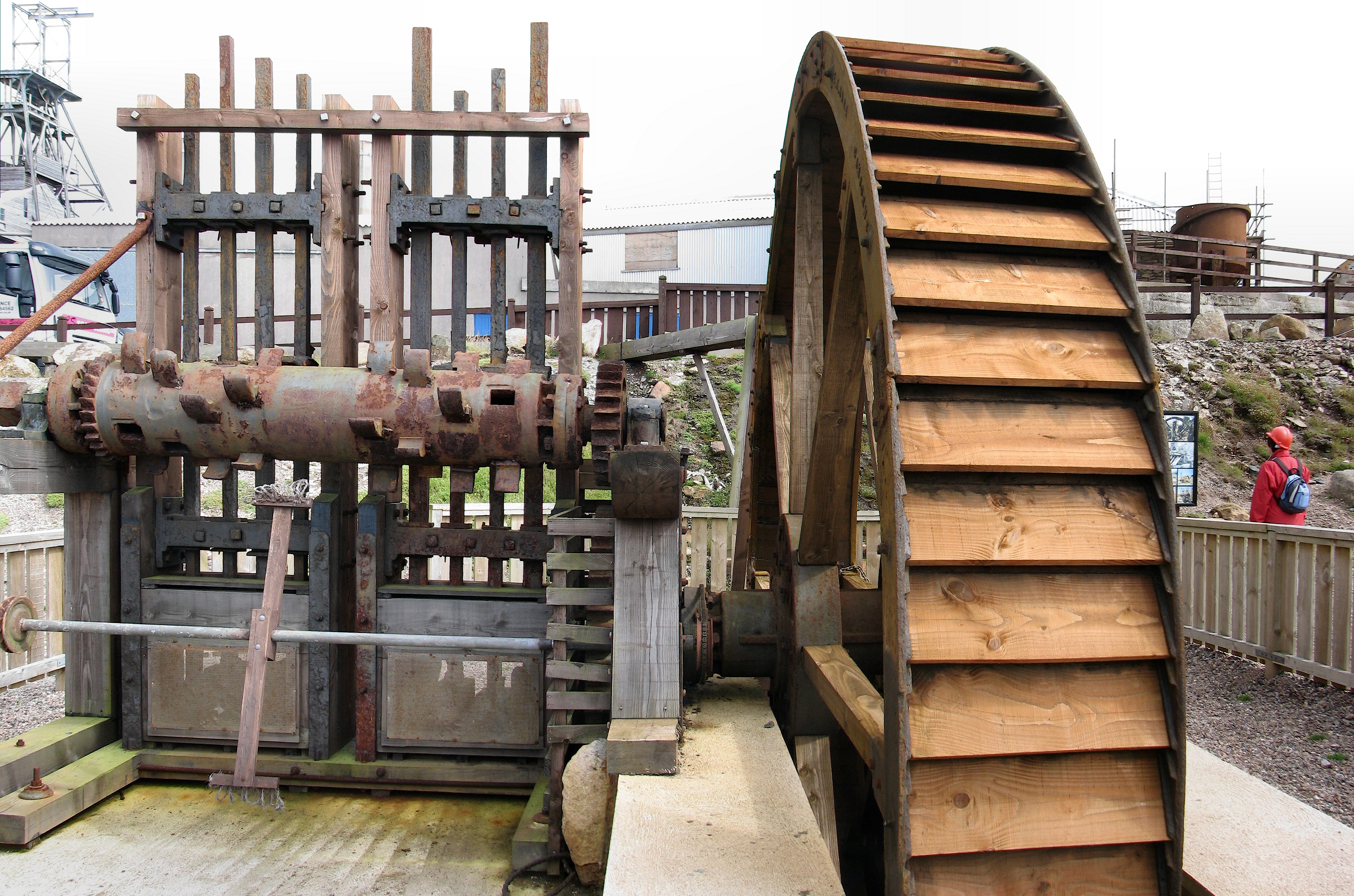
Eight heads of Cornish stamps powered by a waterwheel

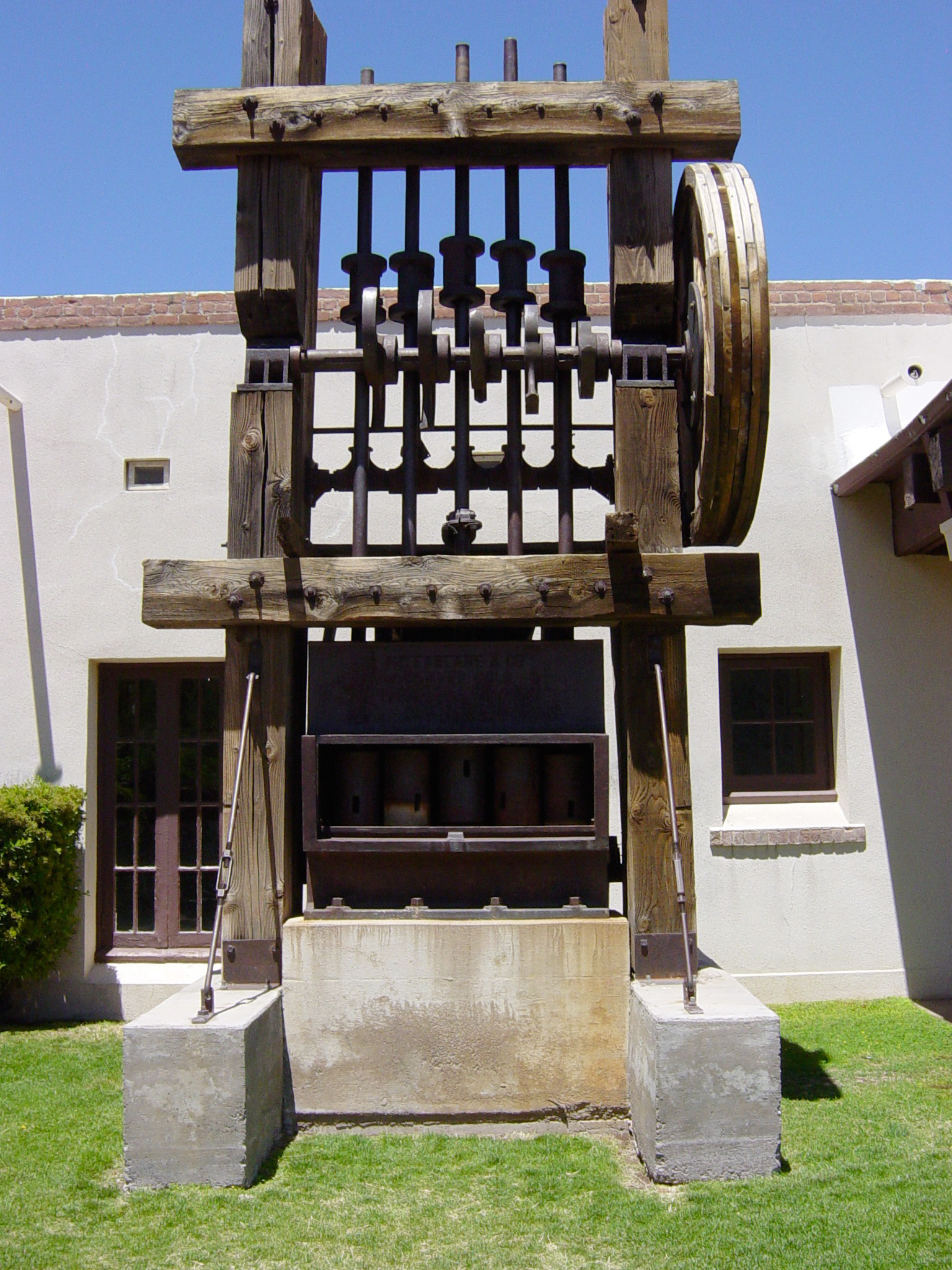
A five unit Californian stamp mill once used in Arizona for crushing copper ore.

Cornish stamps are stamp mills that were developed in Cornwall for use in tin mining in around 1850. Cornish stamps were used to crush small lumps of ore into sand-like material. The stamp was constructed from heavy timber with an iron "head" at the bottom. It was lifted by cams on a rotating axle, and fell on the ore and water mixture, fed into a box beneath. The head normally weighed between 4 and 8 cwt (about 200 to 400 kg) each, and were usually arranged in sets of four, in timber frames. Small stamps were commonly powered by water wheels and larger ones by steam engines.

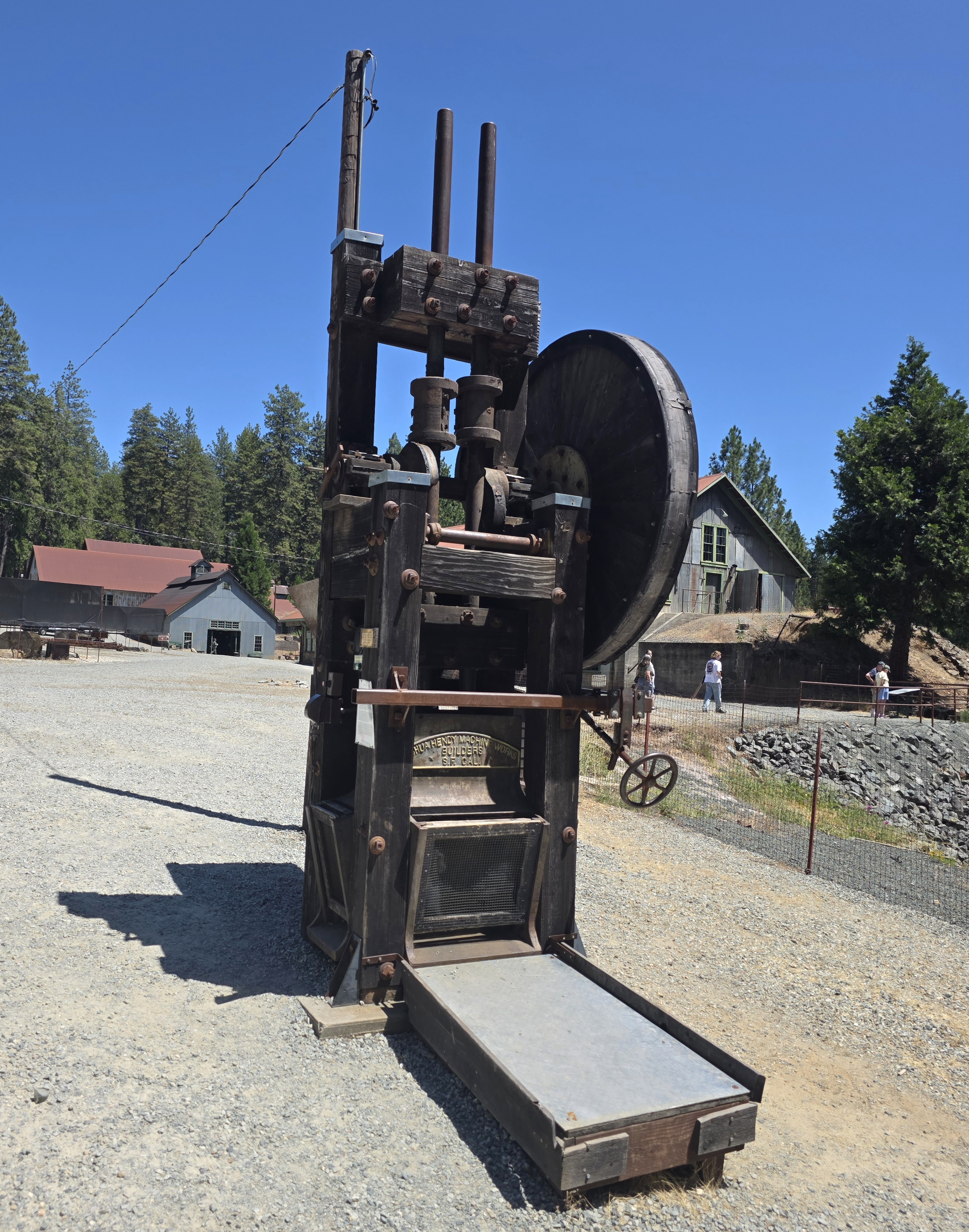
An operational stamp mill used in gold mining, on display at the Empire Mine State Historic Park in Grass Valley, California

Californian stamps were based on Cornish stamps and were used for the Californian gold mines. In these stamps the cam is arranged to lift the stamp from the side, so that it causes the stamp to rotate. This evens the wear on the shoe at the foot of the stamp. They were more rapid in action and a single head could crush 1.5 tons of ore as opposed to the Cornish stamps which could only crush 1 ton.

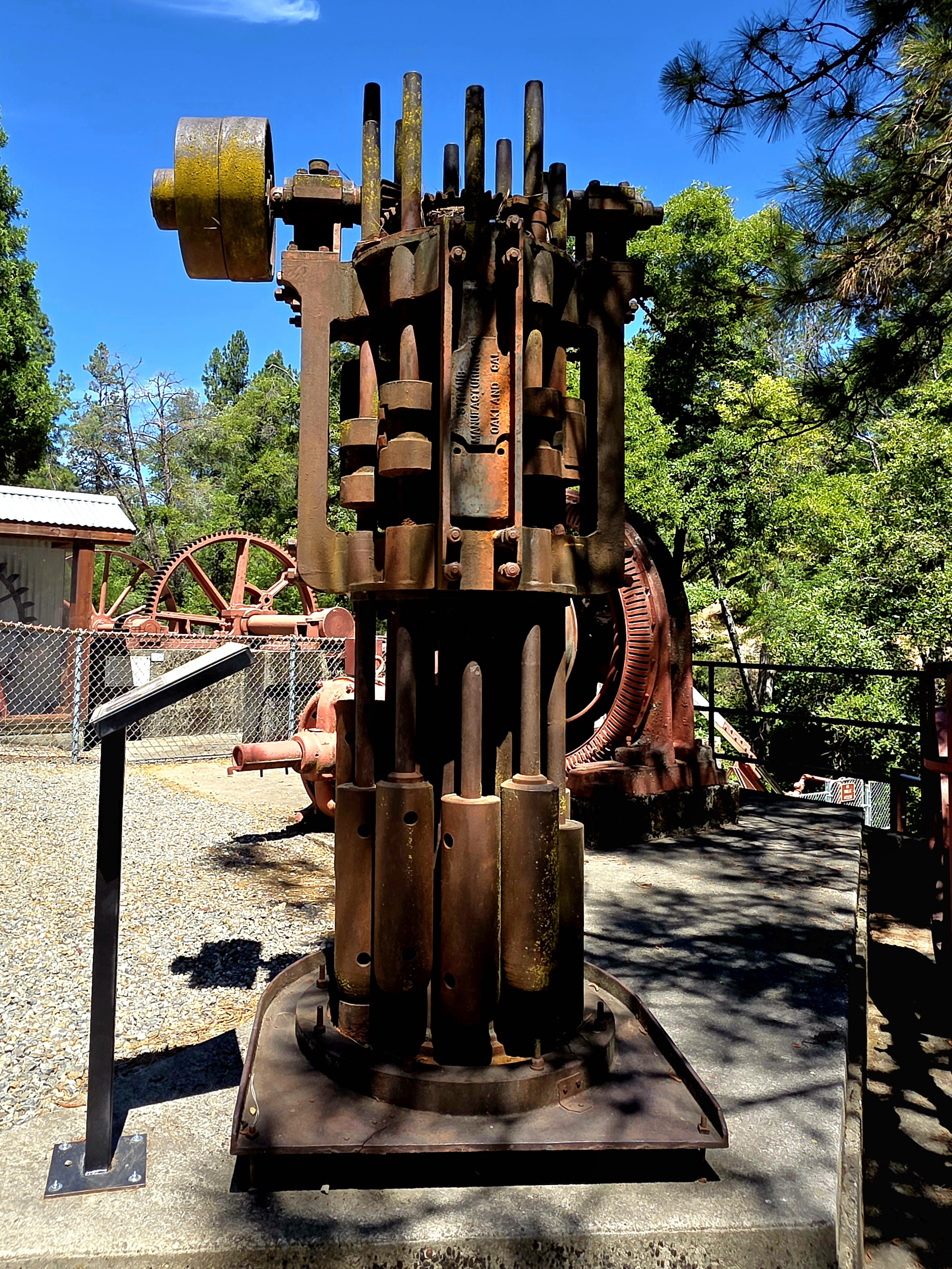
Straub rotary stamp mill

In the early 20th century, rotary stamp mills were developed in California, with designs ranging from five to 14 stamps.

== Other stamping mills ==
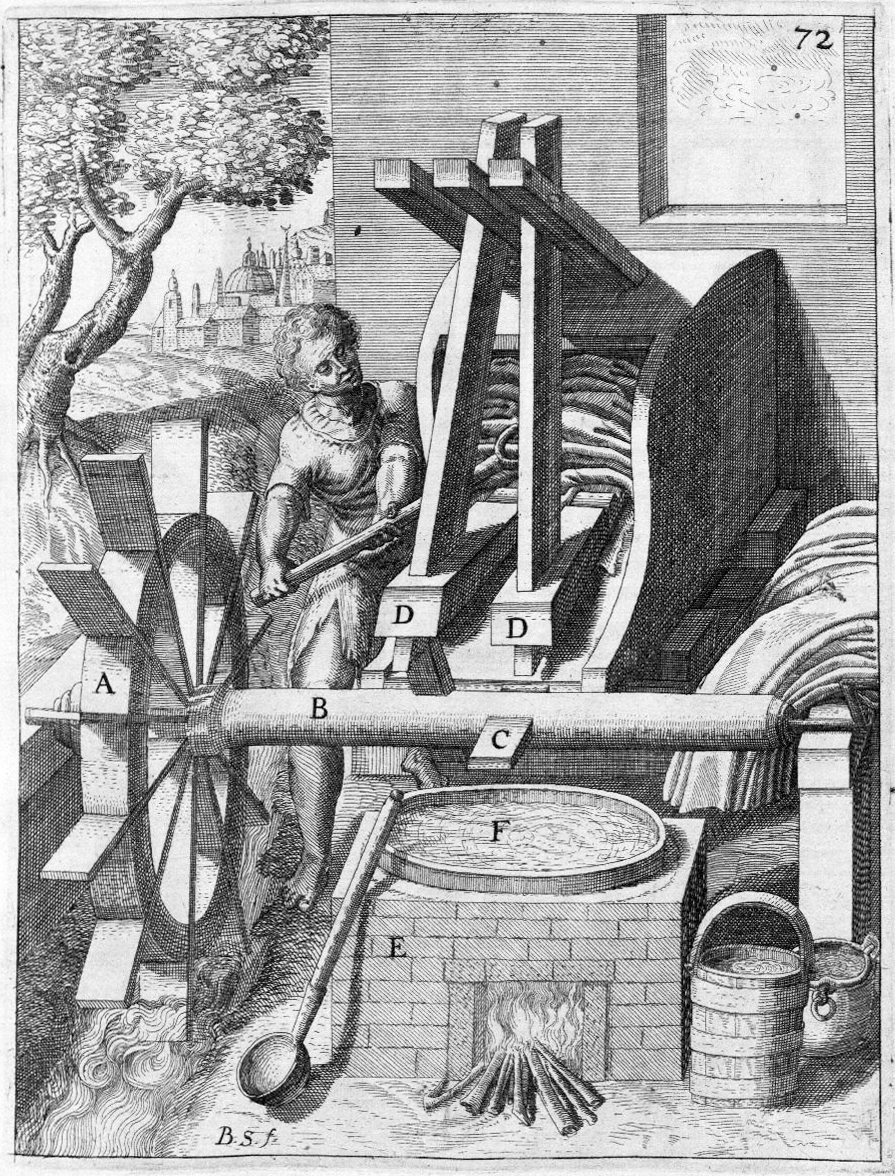
A fulling mill from Georg Andreas Böckler's Theatrum Machinarum Novum, 1661

Stamp mills were used in early paper making for preparing the paper-stuff (pulp), before the invention of the Hollander beater, and might have derived from those used in fulling wool. They were used in oil-seed processing prior to pressing the oil from the milled seeds. Early mills were water-powered but mills can also be steam or electric powered.

A stamping mill may refer to a factory that performs stamping.

== See also ==
- Ball mill - a horizontal cylinder containing metal balls to crush the material
- Dhenki - an Indian rice mill
- Hammermill - a more modern device that also can crush material to fines
- Hammer mill - an historical forge using trip hammers
- Stamp sand - the product of ore mills
- Usu (mortar) - a Japanese stamp mill

== Bibliography ==
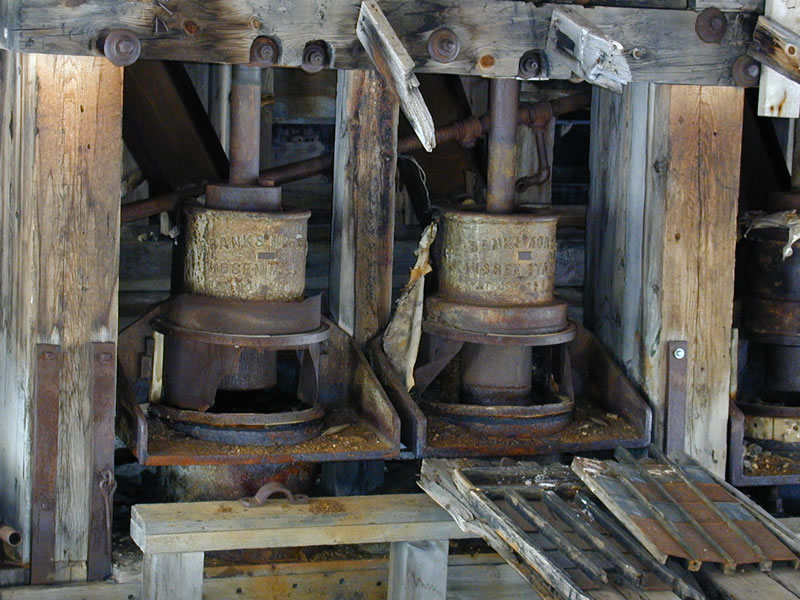
Two Nissen stamps, installed c. 1909 at the Sound Democrat Mill near Silverton, Colorado

- Needham, Joseph: Science and Civilization in China: Volume 4, Part 2. (Taipei: Caves Books Ltd 1986)
- Wilson, Andrew (2002): "Machines, Power and the Ancient Economy", The Journal of Roman Studies, Vol. 92, pp. 1–32 (16, 21f.)
