= Marson (surname) =

Marson is a surname.

== People ==
Notable people with the surname include:

- Aileen Marson (1912–1939), British actress
- Alberto Marson (1925–2018), Brazilian basketball player
- Ania Marson (born 1949), English actress
- Fred Marson (1900–1976), English footballer
- Julie Marson (born 1966), British politician
- Leonard Marson (1918–1994), English rugby league player
- Lorna Marson, British surgeon
- Lou Marson (born 1986), American baseball player
- Mike Marson (born 1955), Canadian ice hockey player
- Richard Marson (born c. 1967), English writer, television producer and director
- Roberto Marson (1944–2011), Italian Paralympic athlete
- Una Marson (1905–1965), Jamaican activist and writer

== See also ==
- Pierre de Joybert de Soulanges et de Marson (1641–1678)
- Marston (surname)
- Marson (disambiguation)
- Marsone (disambiguation)
