= Marston (surname) =

Marston is a surname, and may refer to:

== A ==
- Adrian Marston (1927–2016), British surgeon
- Amos W. Marston (1865–1947), American lawyer, rower and rowing coach
- Amy Marston (born 1972), English actress
- Ann Marston (1938–1971), American archery champion, beauty pageant contestant and rock band manager
- Archibald D. Marston (1891–1962), British anaesthetist

== B ==
- Brad Marston, American physicist

== C ==
- Cathy Marston (born 1975), British choreographer and artistic director
- Colin Marston (born 1982), American record producer and musician

== D ==
- Daniel Marston, British orienteering competitor
- Daniel Marston (historian), American historian
- Denise Marston-Smith (born 1977), English field hockey player
- Dick Marston, American politician

== E ==
- Edgar L. Marston (1860–1935), American banker, industrialist and philanthropist
- Edward Marston, pseudonym for English detective and historical fiction author Keith Miles
- Elizabeth Holloway Marston (1893–1993), American attorney and psychologist
- Elsa Marston (1933–2017), American author of children's books

== F ==
- Freda Marston (1895–1949), British painter and printmaker

== G ==
- George Marston (Massachusetts politician) (1821–1883), American politician and Massachusetts attorney general
- George Marston (California politician) (1850–1946), American politician, department store owner and philanthropist
- George Marston (artist) (1882–1940), English artist
- Gilman Marston (1811–1890), American politician and soldier from New Hampshire
- Ginna Marston (born 1958), American advertising executive
- Gwen Marston (1936–2019), American quilter and author

== H ==
- Hedley Marston (1900–1965), Australian biochemist
- Hilary D. Marston, American physician-scientist and global health policy adviser

== I ==
- Isaac Marston (1839–1891), American jurist

== J ==
- Jack Marston or John Marston (1948–2013), English rugby league footballer
- Jeffery Allen Marston (1831–1911), British surgeon general
- Jenna Marston (born 1991), American baseball player
- Joe Marston (1926–2015) was an Australian association footballer
- John Marston (playwright) (1576–1634), English poet and playwright
- John Marston (sailor) (1795–1885), United States Navy officer
- John Marston (businessman) (1836–1918), British bicycle, motorcycle and car manufacturer
- John Marston (USMC) (1884–1957), United States Marine Corps officer
- John Marston (cricketer) (1893–1938), Argentine-born English cricketer
- John Westland Marston (1819–1890), English dramatist
- Joshua Marston (born 1968), American screenwriter and film director

== K ==
- Karen S. Marston (born 1968), American judge

== L ==
- Lawrence Marston (1857–1939), American actor and director
- Leslie Roy Marston, American Methodist bishop
- Levi Marston (1816–1904), American sea captain

== M ==
- Maurice Marston (1929–2002), English footballer
- Max Marston (1892–1949), American amateur golfer
- Maybelle Marston (1895–1983), American contralto singer

== N ==
- Nathaniel Marston (1975–2015), American actor and producer
- Nicholas Marston (died 1624), English priest

== O ==
- Otis R. Marston (1894–1979), American writer, historian and runner

== P ==
- Paul Marston (born 1946), British academic, author and lay minister
- Peter G. Marston (1935–2022), American scientist, businessman, actor and musician
- Philip Bourke Marston (1850–1887), English poet

== Q ==
- Quinn Marston (born 1988), American musician and artist

== R ==
- Ralph Marston (1907−1967), American football player
- Richard Marston (1847–1917), English scenic designer on Broadway
- Robert Bright Marston (1853–1927), English angler, writer and publisher
- Robert Q. Marston (1923–1999), American medical scientist and academic official
- Roger Marston (died c.1303), English Franciscan scholastic philosopher and theologian

== S ==
- Sallie A. Marston (born 1953), American social geographer
- Sharon Marston (born 1970), British designer

== T ==
- Theodore Marston (1868–1920), American silent film director and writer

== W ==
- Ward Marston (born 1952), American audio transfer engineer, publisher of historical recordings
- Wayne Marston (born 1947), Canadian politician
- William H. Marston (1835–1926), American sea captain, early resident of Berkeley, California
- William Moulton Marston (1893–1947), American psychologist, creator of "Wonder Woman"

== See also ==
- Marson (surname)
