= Macon =

Macon may refer to:

== Places ==
=== Belgium ===
- Macon, Belgium, a village

=== France ===
- Arrondissement of Mâcon, Bourgogne-Franche-Comté
  - Mâcon, a city
  - Ancient Diocese of Mâcon
  - Mâcon, another name for the Mâconnais wine from that region

=== United States ===
- Macon, Alabama, an unincorporated community
- Macon, Georgia, a consolidated city-county
- Macon metropolitan area, Georgia
- Macon, Illinois, a town
- Macon, Michigan, an unincorporated community
- Macon, Mississippi, a city
- Macon, Missouri, a city
- Macon, Nebraska, an unincorporated community
- Macon, North Carolina, a town
- Macon, Tennessee, an unincorporated community
- Macon, Texas, an unincorporated community
- Macon, Virginia, an unincorporated community
- Macon County (disambiguation)
- Macon Township (disambiguation)
- Fort Macon, Fort Macon State Park, North Carolina

== Rivers ==
- Bayou Macon, a river in Arkansas and Louisiana

== Naval vessels ==
- CSS Macon, a Confederate Civil War gunboat
- SS Macon, a 1918 coal ship built by the McDougall Duluth Shipbuilding Company for World War II, renamed SS Lake Helen before delivery
- USS Macon (ZRS-5), an airship built in 1933
- USS Macon (PF-96), a planned patrol frigate cancelled in 1943
- USS Macon (CA-132), a cruiser built in 1945

== People ==
- Macon (surname), a list of people surnamed Macon or Maçon
- Macon (given name), a list of people
- Count of Mâcon, a Burgundian title

== Schools in the United States ==
- Macon County High School, Montezuma, Georgia
- Macon Early College, a high school in Franklin, North Carolina, United States
- Macon High School (Illinois), Macon, Illinois
- Macon High School (Mississippi), Macon, Mississippi
- Macon High School (Missouri), Macon, Missouri
- Macon State College, a former four-year state college unit of the University System of Georgia

== Sports ==
=== Teams ===
==== Based in Macon, Georgia ====
- Macon Bacon, a collegiate summer baseball team
- Macon Knights, a former arena football team
- Macon Mayhem, a minor league ice hockey team
- Macon Music, a short-lived minor league baseball team
- Macon Peaches, a former minor league baseball team
- Macon Steel, a former indoor football team
- Macon Trax, a former minor league ice hockey team
- Macon Whoopee (CHL), a Central Hockey League ice hockey team from 1996 to 2001
- Macon Whoopee (ECHL), an East Coast Hockey League ice hockey team during the 2001–02 season
- Macon Whoopees (SHL), a Southern Hockey League ice hockey team during the 1973–74 season

==== Based elsewhere ====
- Macon Athletics, a former minor league baseball team based in Macon, Missouri

=== Other sports ===
- Macon Coliseum, a multi-purpose arena in Macon, Georgia
- Macon Open (tennis), a former tennis tournament held in Macon, Georgia
- Macon Open, a former Nike Tour golf tournament held in Macon, Georgia
- Macon Speedway, Macon, Illinois, a dirt oval
- A symmetric type of oar used in the sport of rowing

== Other uses ==
- Macon, an early American automobile intended to be produced by the All-Steel Motor Car Co., which went bankrupt
- Le maçon, an 1825 French opéra comique
- Macon, first half of the double-album Macon, Georgia by Jason Aldean
- Ma-con, a German racing team
- Macon (food), a bacon substitute
- Macón (horse), an Argentinian racehorse
- Macon Downtown Airport, a public-use airport near Macon, Georgia
- Macon Hotel, a historic building in Columbus, Ohio, United States
- Macon Library, a branch library in Brooklyn, New York
- Mâcon Treasure, a Roman silver hoard found in the city of Mâcon, eastern France in 1764
- A variant spelling of Mahound, itself a derogatory spelling of Muhammad
