= John Marsden =

John Marsden may refer to:

- John Marsden (footballer) (born 1992), English footballer
- John Marsden (lawyer) (1942–2006), Australian solicitor
- John Marsden (rower) (1915–2004), English rower, intelligence officer and teacher
- John Marsden (rugby league) (born 1953), English rugby league footballer of the 1970s and 1980s
- John Marsden (writer) (1950–2024), Australian author of books for children and young adults
- John Howard Marsden (1803–1891), English vicar and archaeologist
- John Buxton Marsden (1803–1870), English cleric, historical writer and editor
- John Morris Marsden (1857–1939), British solicitor and philatelist
- John Marsden, the host of Body Hits

== See also ==
- John Marston (disambiguation)
