= Marson (disambiguation) =

Marson is a commune in the canton of Châlons-en-Champagne-3, Marne, Grand Est, France

Marson may also refer to:

- Marson (surname)
- Marson-sur-Barboure, a commune in the Meuse, Grand Est, France
- Rou-Marson a commune in the Loire Valley, France

== See also ==
- Slavonski Brod (Latin: Marsonia), Croatia
- Marsonnas, France
- Marsone (disambiguation)
- Masson (disambiguation)
- Mason (disambiguation)
- Macon (disambiguation)
