= St Nicholas, Tooting Graveney =

Coordinates: 51.4248°N 0.1620°W

St Nicholas, Tooting
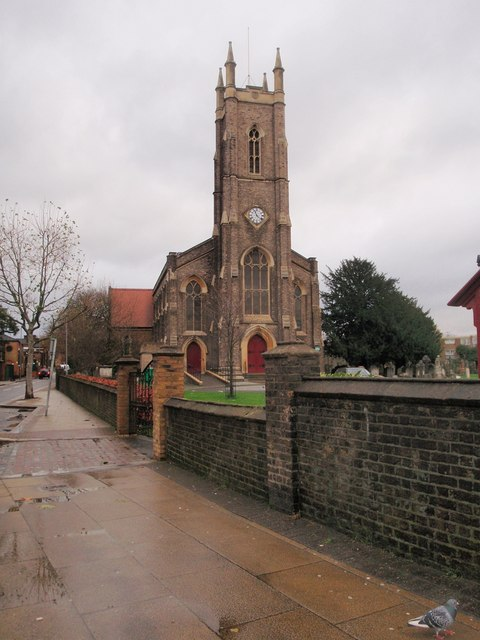
- St Nicholas, Tooting
- OS grid reference: TQ 27888 71130
- Location: Church Lane, Tooting Graveney, Greater London, SW17 9PP
- Country: England
- Denomination: Church of England
- Website: stnicholastooting.org.uk

History
- Status: Active

Architecture
- Functional status: Parish church

Administration
- Diocese: Diocese of Southwark
- Archdeaconry: Archdeaconry of Wandsworth
- Parish: Tooting Graveney

Clergy
- Rector: The Revd Tim Dennis

St Nicholas, Tooting Graveney, is a Church of England parish church in central Tooting, within the London Borough of Wandsworth, England. Originating in the Saxon period and recorded in the Doomesday Book of 1086, the mediveal church was altered throughout the centuries while maintaining its distinctive round Saxon tower. By 1814, the congregation had outgrown the building's capacity, leading to the construction of a new church on an adjacent site in 1832–33 to designs by the architect Thomas Witlam Atkinson.

Later extended during the Victorian Era, the church was designated a Grade II listed building in 1955, and its historical archives are held by the London Metropolitan Archives. Today, the parish falls within the Diocese of Southwark and holds weekly Sunday services, while notable past rectors include the 19th Century cleric and historian John Buxton Marsden.

== History ==
The church of St Nicholas has its origins in the Saxon period, and is recorded in the Domesday Book of 1086. The original building was extended and altered many times, but retained its round Saxon tower. By 1814 however, the congregation had exceeded its capacity, and it was decided to rebuild the church on a nearby site, which was achieved in 1832–33 under the architect Thomas Witlam Atkinson, while this new building was itself extended in the Victorian period. It has been a grade II listed building since 1955, and its archives are held by the London Metropolitan Archives.

== Present ==
St Nicholas's continues to be an active local church, with services at 10:30 and 18:00 each Sunday.

== Notable clergy ==
- John Buxton Marsden, rector from 1833 to 1844, cleric and historian
