= Manfred Steiner (physician) =

American physician

- Born: November 23, 1931; Vienna, First Austrian Republic
- Died: January 7, 2023 (age 91)
- Education: University of Vienna; Massachusetts Institute of Technology; Brown University
- Occupations: Hematologist, physicist
- Scientific career
- Workplaces: Brown Medical School

Manfred Steiner (November 23, 1931 – January 7, 2023) was an Austrian-born American hematologist and physicist who taught at Brown Medical School until 2000.

== Life ==
Steiner was born in Vienna on November 23, 1931. He earned a medical degree from the University of Vienna in 1955 and moved to Washington, D.C. to complete his initial training in internal medicine. Steiner studied hematology at Tufts University before earning a Ph.D. in biochemistry from the Massachusetts Institute of Technology in 1967.

Steiner moved to Rhode Island to teach at the Medical School of Brown University, where he was promoted to full professor in 1978. Towards the end of his career, Steiner worked to establish a program in hematology at the University of South Carolina School of Medicine, Greenville. He retired from medicine in 2000.

In September 2021, Steiner completed a Ph.D. in physics at Brown University; his dissertation was entitled Corrections to the Geometrical Interpretation of Bosonization. Steiner's doctoral advisor was Brad Marston.

He died on January 7, 2023 at the age of 91.
