= British Transplantation Society =

Non-profit professional body

British Transplant Society
- Abbreviation: BTS
- Established: 1971
- President: Richard Baker
- Vice President: Nicholas Torpey
- Website: https://bts.org.uk/

The British Transplantation Society (BTS) is a non-profit professional body representing the community of physicians, surgeons, nurses, allied health professionals and scientists involved in organ transplantation in the United Kingdom. The BTS supports the provision and dissemination of medical research in organ transplantation, and also develops national guidance and policy in the provision of transplant care to patients, including living donation. Notably the society supported the debate for presumed consent from deceased donors in United Kingdom parliament and also the use of donation after circulatory failure (DCD) in the expansion of the donor pool.

== Purpose ==
The purpose of the BTS is "to promote transplantation in all its forms". However, the society states four strategic aims:

1. To advance research and innovation in the field of organ transplantation
2. To promote ethical standards in research and transplant medicine
3. To promote a culture of organ donation by influencing public opinion
4. To support patients living with a transplanted organ

== Education and research ==
The BTS provides training and education to doctors in clinical transplantation. The BTS congress is held annually in order for novel research to be disseminated to the clinical and scientific communities.

=== Awards ===
The BTS awards two prizes each year to clinicians and scientists for excellence in transplantation research.

==== Medawar Medal ====
The society gives two Medawar Medals each year to a doctor and scientist presenting the best clinical or scientific research, respectively. The award is named after Sir Peter Medawar, the founder chairman of BTS and winner of the 1962 Nobel Prize in Medicine or Physiology for the discovery of transplantation principle.

==== Roy Calne Medal ====
The society awards a medal to the competitive winner of a peer-reviewed publication in a recognised academic journal. The award is named after Sir Roy Yorke Calne, who was the first surgeon to perform a combined heart-lung-liver transplant in 1987, the first liver transplantation operation in Europe in 1968, and the first small bowel transplant in the UK in 1992.

== Presidents ==
The BTS was originally led by chairmen, with the position being designated president from 1984 onwards. The following individuals have served as leaders of the society since its establishment.

- Peter Medawar (1972-1974)
- Richard Batchelor (1974-1977)
- Peter Morris (1977-1980)
- John Salaman (1980-1983)
- Robert Sells (1983-1986)
- Ross Taylor (1986-1989)
- Douglas Briggs (1989-1992)
- John Fabre (1992-1995)
- Robert Johnson (1995-1999)
- Andrew Bradley (1999-2002)
- Philip Dyer (2002-2005)
- John Forsythe (2005-2007)
- Peter Friend (2007-2009)
- Keith Rigg (2009-2011)
- Christopher Watson (2011-2013)
- Anthony Warrens (2013-2015)
- Derek Manas (2015-2017)
- Lorna Marson (2017-2019)
- Stephen Wigmore (2019-2021)
- Alison Burnapp (2021-2023)
- Krishna Menon (2023-2025)
- Richard Baker (2025-present)
