= John Marston (disambiguation) =

John Marston is a protagonist in the Red Dead Redemption series.

John Marston may also refer to:

- John Marston (playwright) (1576–1634), English playwright, poet
- John Marston (sailor) (1795–1885), United States Navy officer
- John Westland Marston (1819–1890), English dramatist
- John Marston (businessman) (1836–1918), English
- John Marston (USMC) (1884–1957), United States Marine Corps officer
- John Marston (cricketer) (1893–1938), Argentine-born English cricketer
- Jack Marston or John Marston (1948–2013), English rugby league footballer

== See also ==
- John Marsden (disambiguation)
