= Masson =

Masson may refer to:

== Places ==
- Masson (electoral district), a Quebec provincial electoral district
- Masson Island, an Antarctic island
- Masson Range, a mountain range in Antarctica
- Masson-Angers, a former town and current sector of the City of Gatineau, QC

== Other uses ==
- Masson (surname)
- Masson (publisher), a French publisher of scientific books
- Masson Hall, the first "proper" hall of residence for women attending the University of Edinburgh, now closed

== See also ==
- Paul Masson Mountain Winery
- Masson-Angers, Quebec, a sector of the city of Gatineau, Quebec, Canada
- Macon (disambiguation)
- Mason (disambiguation)
- Marson (disambiguation)
