= Yefim Yevdokimov =

Soviet politician and security officer (1891–1940)

Yefim Yevdokimov Ефим Евдокимов
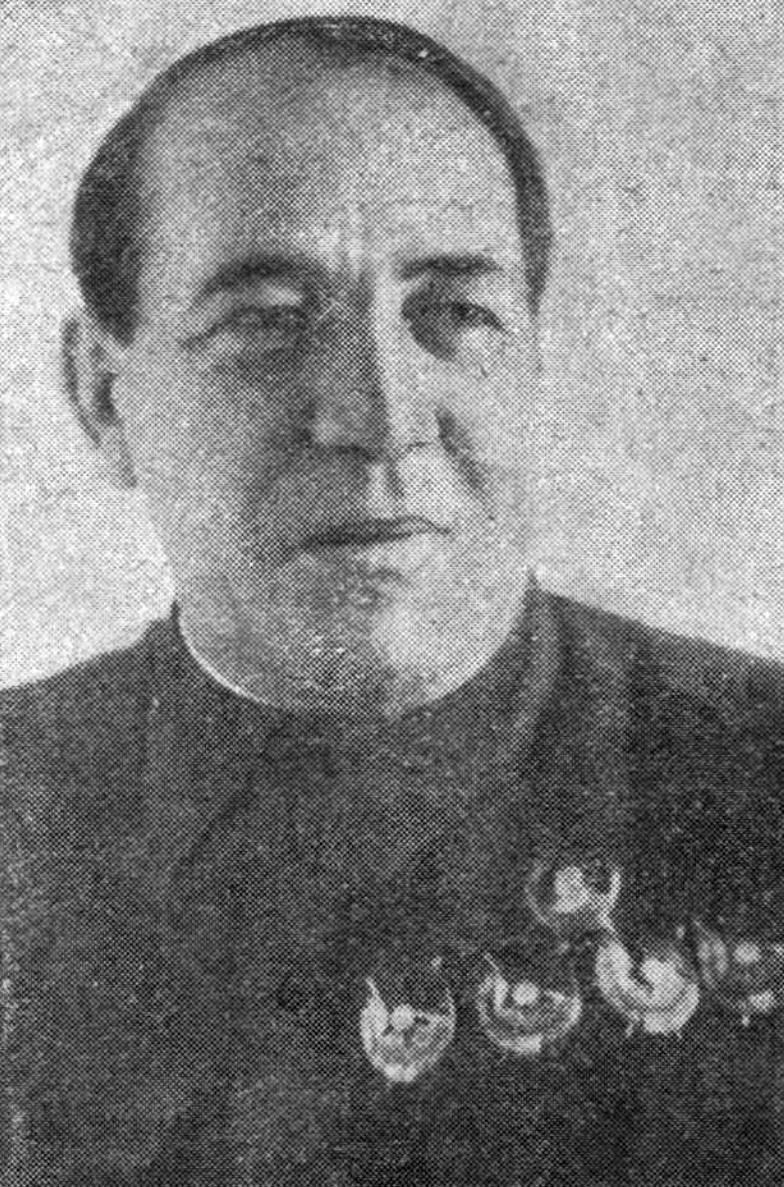
- Yevdokimov in 1938

Deputy People's Commissar of Water Transport of the Soviet Union
- In office May 1938 – 9 November 1938

First Secretary of the Rostov Regional Committee
- In office 13 September 1937 – May 1938
- Preceded by: Post established
- Succeeded by: Boris Dvinsky

First Secretary of the Azov-Black Sea Regional Committee
- In office 13 March 1937 – 13 September 1937
- Preceded by: Post established
- Succeeded by: Post disestablished

First Secretary of the North Caucasus Regional Committee
- In office January 1934 – 13 March 1937
- Preceded by: Boris Sheboldayev
- Succeeded by: Post disestablished

Personal details
- Born: 20 January 1891 Kopal, Semirechye Oblast, Russian Empire
- Died: 2 February 1940 (aged 49) Kommunarka shooting ground, Moscow, Soviet Union
- Resting place: Kommunarka shooting ground
- Citizenship: Russian
- Party: All-Union Communist Party (Bolsheviks) (1917–1938)

Yefim Georgievich Yevdokimov (Russian: Ефи́м Гео́ргиевич Евдоки́мов; 20 January [O.S. 8 January] 1891 – 2 February 1940) was a Soviet politician and member of the Cheka, the OGPU, and the NKVD. He was a key figure in the Red Terror, the Great Purge and dekulakization that saw millions of people executed and deported.

Yevdokimov became a member of the Central Committee of the All-Union Communist Party of Bolsheviks in 1934 and a deputy of the Supreme Soviet of the USSR in 1937. He was arrested on 9 November 1938 and executed 2 February 1940. He was posthumously rehabilitated in 1956.

== Biography ==
=== Early years ===
Yevdokimov was born either in Perm, in European Russia, or in Kopal, Semirechye Oblast, Russian Empire (now Qapal, Kazakhstan). His family were poor peasants. His father, Georgy Savvateyevich Yevdokimov, was a peasant from Kursk who joined the Semirechye Cossacks and married a young peasant, Anastasia Arkhipovna. In 1893, two years after Yefim's birth, the family moved to Chita.

He began working at the age of 14 as a train coupler, then as a clerk. In 1905, he was wounded in a shootout with a punitive detachment that occupied the station. He was arrested in 1907, and sentenced to four years of hard labor, commuted to three years in prison due to being a minor. After leaving the Verkhneudinsk prison in 1911, he was confined to the Kamyshinsky District, where he joined the anarcho-syndicalists, before absconding to return illegally to Siberia.

=== Revolutionary activities ===
He participated in revolutionary activities as a member of the Socialist Revolutionary Party, an anarchist and a member of the Socialist Maximalist Party. According to one source, he joined the Polish Socialist Party in 1907, but there was also a rumour later known to his colleagues in the Soviet police that he was arrested not for revolutionary activity, but as a common criminal.

During the First World War, hiding from conscription into the Russian Imperial Army, he went underground. Following the February Revolution, Yevdokimov was drafted into the army and enlisted as a private in the 12th Siberian Reserve Regiment (Irkutsk), where he was elected to the regimental revolutionary committee. In September 1917, he was demobilized for health reasons. He participated in the October Revolution in Moscow.

In 1918, he joined the CPSU(b) and the Red Army. In 1919 he joined the Cheka.

=== Career in the Cheka/OGPU/NKVD ===
During June–December 1919, he was head of the Special Department of the Moscow Cheka. He led the arrests and investigation into the case of the Headquarters of the Volunteer Army of the Moscow region. Based on the results of the investigation, members of the Headquarters were shot.

In January 1920, he took on the role of Deputy Head of the Special Department of the South-Western and Southern Fronts. He organized the investigation into the case of the “Committee for the Liberation of Ukraine”.

He took part in carrying out mass terror in Crimea after its capture by the Bolsheviks. On November 21, 1920, he was appointed head of the special “Crimean Shock Group”, which supervised the execution of the captured military personnel of Wrangel’s Army, despite promises of amnesty. For his work, he was quietly presented with the Order of the Red Banner. The award list noted:

During the defeat of General Wrangel's army in Crimea, comrade Evdokimov and his expedition cleared the Crimean peninsula of white officers and counterintelligence officers remaining there for the underground, seizing up to 30 governors, 50 generals, more than 300 colonels, the same number of counterintelligence officers and a total of up to 12,000 white elements, thereby preventing the possibility of white gangs appearing in Crimea.

At the end of the Civil War, he was appointed head of the secret operational department of the All-Ukrainian Cheka. In 1922, he was appointed plenipotentiary representative of the OGPU in Right Bank Ukraine.

In 1923, Yevdokimov was appointed head of the OGPU in the North Caucasus region, based in Rostov. He was based in this territory for the next 15 years.

In 1931–1932, he was the plenipotentiary representative of the OGPU in Central Asia, engaged in the suppression of the Basmachi in the Turkmen SSR and Tajik SSR. In 1933, he was elected first secretary of the North Caucasus Regional Committee of the All-Union Communist Party of Bolsheviks. He also worked in senior positions in the GPU-OGPU of the USSR, as head of the Secret Political Department, which was engaged in the fight against political opponents.

=== The Shakhty Trial ===
In 1927, Yevdokimov claimed to be close to uncovering a network of saboteurs who were undermining industrial production in south Russia, directed, he claimed, from abroad. The head of the OGPU, Vyacheslav Menzhinsky reputedly did not believe him and threatened to have him arrested unless he produced solid evidence, in which he was backed by the head of the USSR government, Alexei Rykov, but while Joseph Stalin was on holiday in Sochi, Yevdokimov met him, repeated his allegations, and won his support.

This led to the first of the provincial show trials of the Stalin era, the Shakhty Trial, in which 53 managers and engineers from the town of Shakhty, near Rostov, were accused of sabotage, five of whom were executed, and 40 sent to prison. Yevdokimov was in charge of forcing the defendants to confess and ensuring they would not withdraw their confessions in court.

In January 1929, the First Secretary of the North Caucasus territorial committee (kraikom) of the CPSU Andrey Andreyev, and two other high ranking Stalinists, Sergo Ordzhonikidze and Anastas Mikoyan, nominated Yevdokimov for the Order of the Red Banner for his role in preparing the trial. However the award was not granted, apparently because of criticisms of his handling of the interrogations, after 23 defendants denied the charges, and others retracted in court the confessions they had made under interrogation.

== Activities in the North Caucasus ==
Yevdokimov was barred from further promotion within the OGPU for as long as it was controlled by Menzhinsky and his deputy, Genrikh Yagoda. Retained in Rostov, he was responsible, with Andreyev, in forcing the peasants in North Caucasus to move onto collective farms. In 1930, the North Caucasus OGPU was set a target of 6,000–8,000 'kulaks' who were to be arrested and executed, and 20,000 to be deported from the territory and the adjoining Dagestan republic.

In April 1933, the writer, Mikhail Sholokhov, who lived within the territory, wrote to Stalin accusing two of Yevdokimov's officers of using torture to extract grain from peasant households. Both men were banned from working in the area.

But Stalin evidently continued to rate Yevdokimov highly. According to the OGPU officer Alexander Orlov, Stalin proposed to appoint him head of the Leningrad regional OGPU, but the local party boss, Sergei Kirov, objected. Orlov believed that Stalin was planning Kirov's assassination, which Yevdokimov was to have organised.

In January 1934, the North Caucasian territory was divided administratively into two. One part, centred on Rostov, was renamed the Azov-Black Sea territory. Yevdokimov was transferred to Pyatigorsk as First Secretary of the North Caucasus kraikom, and in February was elected a member of the Central Committee. He was the first career officer from the OGPU to be appointed to a party post of that seniority. In September 1937, the territory was split again, and Yevdokimov was designated First Secretary of the Rostov region.

After Nikolai Yezhov was appointed head of the NKVD – as the OGPU was now named – in September 1936, Yevdokimov's standing within the NKVD rose. He was one of very few local party bosses who were trusted to conduct the Great Purge without outside interference. Yezhov trusted him because he had been on bad terms with Yagoda. When the Central Committee convened in February 1937, Yevdokimov accused Yagoda of obstructing his efforts to expose "vile double-dealers" who had "wormed their way" into responsible positions in the North Caucasus territory to pursue "counter-revolutionary aims," and turned on him saying: "You, Yagoda, were once my boss: what help did I get from you?" After Yagoda's arrest, Stalin proposed that Yevdokimov take over the task of forcing a confession out of Yagoda.

According to Yezhov's biographer, he "put special trust in Chekists from North Caucasia, like Yefim Yevdokimov". Yevdokimov's former deputy, Israel Dagin, was appointed head of the Kremlin guards; Dagin's former deputy, Nikolai Nikolayev-Zhurid, was made head of the Special department, which handled the purge of the Red Army; and Vladimir Kursky, who had been chief investigator at the Shahkty trial, was appointed head of the Secret Political Department, which dealt with major political cases, such as the interrogation of Yagoda.

In January 1937, Yevdokimov was appointed First Secretary of the Azov-Black Sea kraikom, after the incumbent, Boris Sheboldayev, was sacked for allowing former oppositionists to hold jobs in the region. Yevdokimov was set a target to have 14,000 people arrested, from a population of just over 5.6 million. It is likely that he exceeded that figure.

One of those arrested during Yevdokimov's purge was Pyotr Lugovoi, secretary of Veshenskaya district party committee who was a close friend and near neighbour of Mikhail Sholokhov, who complained to Stalin, and refused to join a writers' delegation until his friend was released. After Lugovoi and two others known to Sholokhov were released, he complained to Yevdokimov that they had been tortured, and demanded that the officers responsible should be disciplined. When Yevdokimov fobbed him off, Sholokhov wrote to Stalin in February 1938 denouncing Yevdokimov as a "crafty old fox", who was either hopeless, or an enemy.

Yevdokimov twice sought Stalin's permission to have Sholokhov arrested, complaining that anyone else who behaved as Sholokhov did "would have been arrested long ago." Stalin turned him down.

Evdokimov came to me twice and demanded permission to arrest Sholokhov because he was talking with former White Guards,” Stalin said in 1938, during a meeting with the Veshenians released from prison. “I told Evdokimov that he understands nothing either in politics or in life. How can a writer write about the White Guards and not know what they breathe?"

== Dismissal and death ==
In spring 1938, possibly because of Sholokhov's complaints, Stalin appears to have decided that Yevdokimov had ordered too many arrests. Mikhail Suslov, who would rise to be one of the most powerful leaders of the Soviet communist party in the 1960s and 1970s, was posted to Rostov, initially as one of Yevdokimov's deputies. Yevdokimov's assistant, a career chekist named Pavel Manichkin, was arrested.

On 4 May 1938, Yevdokimov was transferred to Moscow as Deputy People's Commissar for Water Transport, under Yezhov, who had been appointed People's Commissar, while temporarily retaining his post as head of the NKVD. In June, Suslov reported to a party conference in Rostov that "the practice of indiscriminate expelling from the party has ceased. An end has been put to impunity for a various number of slanderers. Gradually the general suspiciousness is breaking down."

In August 1938, Lavrentiy Beria was appointed deputy head of the NKVD, and started building cases against Yezhov and those linked to him. Nikolayev-Zhurid was arrested on 25 October, Dagin on 5 November, and Yevdokimov on 9 November 1938. He was accused of having plotted with Yezhov and others to kill Stalin after they had received news of Beria's appointment.

For five months, Yevdokimov resisted signing any confession. Despite being severely tortured, he signed a statement declaring

I cannot admit the accusation of treason brought against me by the investigation. I have never betrayed my homeland; I have never been a member of any counter-revolutionary or anti-Soviet organizations or groups. On the contrary, during my time in the ranks of the party and at work in the bodies of the Cheka – OGPU, I waged a determined struggle against all manifestations of counter-revolutionary and anti-Soviet activities. I cannot admit that I am guilty of belonging to a right-wing Trotskyist organization... I am aware that the issue about me has already been resolved. But I just can’t plead guilty to the fact that I served the bourgeoisie... I have never been a spy and hireling of the bourgeoisie. In 1923, my brother was killed, I suspect the Poles in this, and therefore how could I work together with the Poles at that time. I smashed all the Polish bandit chieftains and was not their agent. I began to give evidence admitting my guilt after confrontations with Yezhov and Frinovsky and after special influence on me. During the preliminary investigation, I named about 124 people as participants in the conspiracy, but this is a lie, and I plead guilty to this lie. I have never belonged to the right and do not belong... The testimony of other participants in the conspiracy coincides with mine only because we all had one master – the investigator... I ask for one thing – to carefully examine the materials of my case. It really bothers me that I have slandered many people...

On 17 January, to break his resistance, he was confronted by Yezhov and Nikolayev-Zhurid, who had confessed and had named Yevdokimov as a member of their anti-Soviet organisation. On 2 March, doctors insisted that he be transferred to a prison hospital because of the effects of torture. He finally broke down on 13 April 1939, while being interrogated under torture by Beria's deputy, Vsevolod Merkulov, and confessed to having plotted to assassinate Stalin and others. On 16 January 1940, Yevdokimov, his wife, and 19-year-old son were all included with Yezhov, Dagin, Nikolayev-Zhurid, the writer Isaac Babel, and many others linked to Yezhov on a list drawn up by Beria of 346 people who were to be executed.

At his trial, on 2 February 1940, Yevdokimov withdrew his previous confession, asserting:

I will die soon, but I want to tell the court that even under the new leadership (meaning Beria), the apparatus of the NKVD of the USSR works in the same way as it worked under Yezhov... I earnestly ask you to convey this to Stalin. I was not scum (сволочь), but I became one during the investigation, because I could not stand it and began to lie, and I began to lie because I was hit hard on the heels."

He was sentenced to death and shot the same day, at the Kommunarka shooting ground.

Yevdokimov was rehabilitated on 17 March 1956.

== Family ==
Yevdokimov's wife, Marina, was arrested on the same day as her husband, accused of counter-revolutionary activity, tried on 26 January 1940, and shot the following day. Their son, Yuir, who was born in Kharkov in 1920, was arrested several months after his parents, on 12 April 1939, and tried and executed on the same day as his mother.

== Honours and awards ==
- Order of Lenin
- Order of the Red Banner (1930)
- Order of the Red Banner (1928)
- Order of the Red Banner (1923)
- Order of the Red Banner (1921)

On 19 July 1935, the village of Medvezhensky (now Krasnogvardeyskoye, Stavropol Krai) was renamed "Yevdokimovsky" in honor of Yevdokimov, the first secretary of the North Caucasus Krai. After Yevdokimov's arrest as an "enemy of the people" in 1938, the town was renamed "Molotov" in honor of Vyacheslav Molotov.

== See also ==
- The Great Purge
