= List of protected heritage sites in Momignies =

This table shows an overview of the protected heritage sites in the Walloon town Momignies. This list is part of Belgium's national heritage.

Object	Year/architect	Town/section	Address	Coordinates	Number^{?}	Image
Old linden tree growing in the middle of the square "la place Ivon Paul" and the architecture of wooden posts and beams that support it ^{(nl)} ^{(fr)}		Momignies		50.052037°N 4.209646°E	56051-CLT-0001-01 Info	Oude lindeboom groeiend midden op het plein la place Ivon Paul en de architectuur van houten palen en balken die deze ondersteunen
Calvary and environment ^{(nl)} ^{(fr)}		Momignies	rue du Calvaire, ongeveer bij n°140	50.052677°N 4.213718°E	56051-CLT-0002-01 Info	Calvarie en omgeving
Esplanade "Trieu Wicher" and surrounding areas ^{(nl)} ^{(fr)}		Momignies		50.047980°N 4.208154°E	56051-CLT-0003-01 Info	
pond Lobiette ^{(nl)} ^{(fr)}		Momignies		49.977033°N 4.148998°E	56051-CLT-0004-01 Info	
Site of the flow of Passedru stream ^{(nl)} ^{(fr)}		Momignies		49.976902°N 4.148960°E	56051-CLT-0005-01 Info	
Castle Imbrechies: facades and roofs, except for the recent construction in brick, the additions by the current owner and the ensemble formed by the castle and surrounding areas ^{(nl)} ^{(fr)}		Momignies	rue d'Imbrechies n°7	50.039992°N 4.217223°E	56051-CLT-0006-01 Info	
Plot of the first battles of the liberation of Belgium which took place on 02/09/1944 ^{(nl)} ^{(fr)}		Momignies	rue d'Imbrechies, nabij het kasteel	50.039952°N 4.218239°E	56051-CLT-0007-01 Info	
The linden (lime) tree of Macon on the square la place Ivon Paul and the architecture of wooden posts and beams that support it ^{(nl)} ^{(fr)}		Momignies		50.052037°N 4.209646°E	56051-PEX-0001-01 Info	

== See also ==
- List of protected heritage sites in Hainaut (province)
- Momignies
