= Thomas Witlam Atkinson =

English architect, artist and traveller (1799-1861)

Thomas Witlam Atkinson (1799–1861) was an English architect, artist and traveller. Between 1847 and 1853 he travelled 29,000 miles (47,000 km) in Siberia, Central Asia, and present-day Kazakhstan by carriage, horseback, and boat, much of the time together with his wife Lucy and son Alatau, who was born during their travels. He painted 560 watercolors, many of them of places unknown in England at the time. He documented his travels in two books and became a prominent lecturer and a member of the Royal Geographical Society and other scholarly organizations. His art is displayed in museums.

Atkinson was a bigamist, never divorcing his first wife before marrying Lucy, his second wife. His financial troubles possibly prompted him to leave England and undertake his travels in Central Asia.

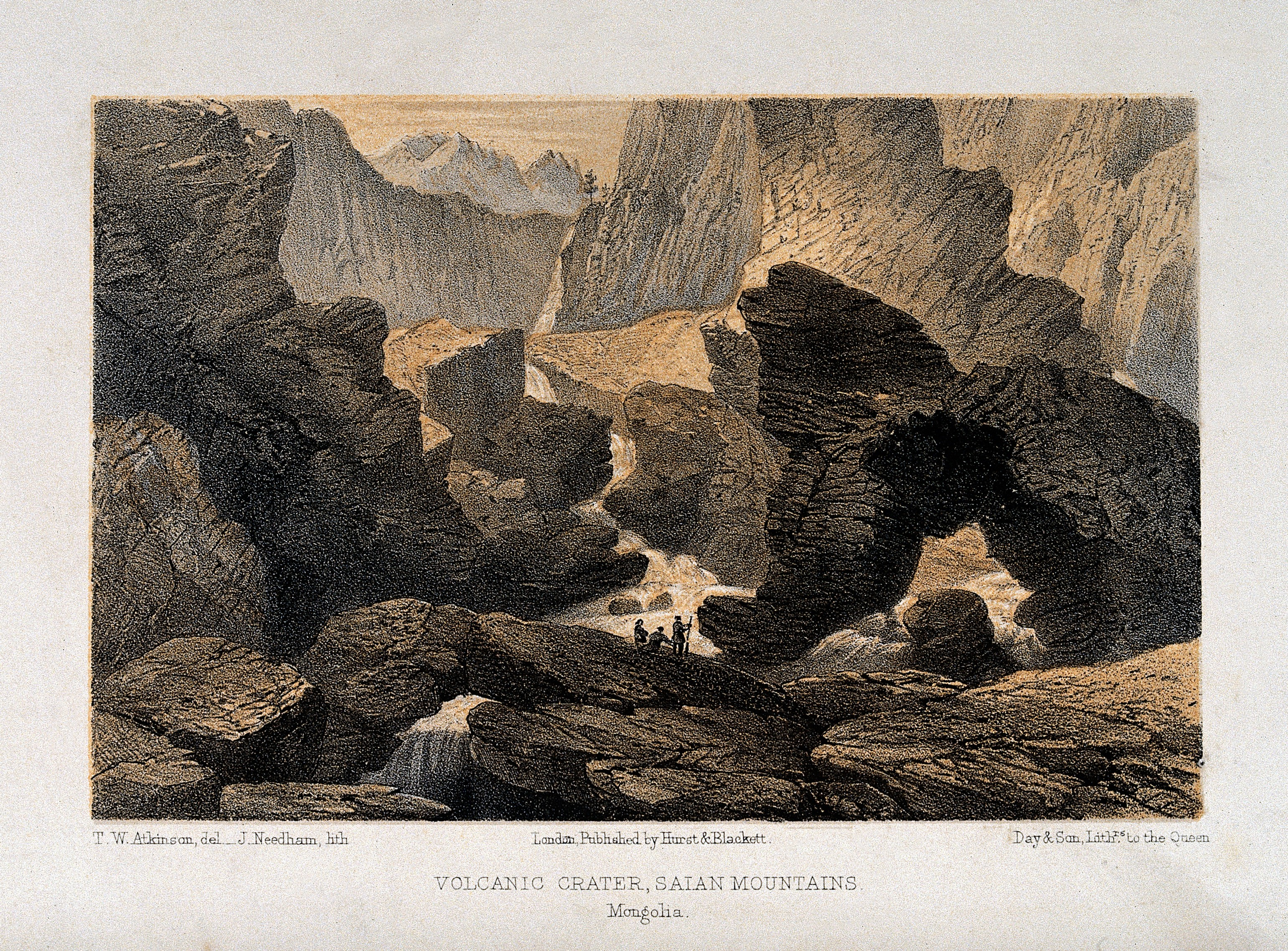
Lithograph of a volcanic crater in the Sayan Mountains from Oriental and Western Siberia by T W Atkinson

== Early life and career ==
Atkinson was born in Cawthorne, near Barnsley, West Riding of Yorkshire in 1799. His father was William Atkinson, a stone mason, and his mother, Martha Witlam, was a housemaid. Both worked at Cannon Hall, home of the Spencer Stanhope family. On 1 April 1819, he married Rebecca Mercer in Halifax, West Yorkshire. The couple had at least three children: Martha, John William, and Emma.

By the time Atkinson was twenty years old he was a mason and stone carver and worked on churches at Barnsley, Ashton-Under-Lyne and elsewhere. Soon after that he became clerk of works to a string of important Victorian architects, including George Basevi, who designed much of Belgrave Square in London. In 1827, he went to London and established himself as an architect in Upper Stamford Street, Blackfriars. In 1829 he published a folio volume entitled Gothic Ornaments selected from the different Cathedrals and Churches in England. Among his architectural works at this time was the church of St. Nicholas, at Lower Tooting, erected about 1831. In the early 1830s, he moved to Manchester. He obtained many important commissions in and around Manchester, including the Manchester and Liverpool District Bank in Spring Gardens in 1834. His principal work as an architect was St Luke's Church, Cheetham. He also designed and built Italinate mansions for Manchester's wealthy families.

In 1838, he filed for bankruptcy. He was said by the London Gazette to be "an architect, stone dealer, timber merchant, builder, dealer, and chapman." Despite his troubles, his drawings were displayed at the Royal Academy. In 1841 Atkinson was arrested in London for unpaid debts. He had apparently fled Manchester for London to escape his creditors.

Perhaps still fleeing his creditors Atkinson traveled to Greece, Egypt and India in the early 1840s. In 1844, he sought unsuccessfully to be the architect for a church in Hamburg. By October 1846 he was in Saint Petersburg, Russia.

== Travels in Russia and Central Asia ==
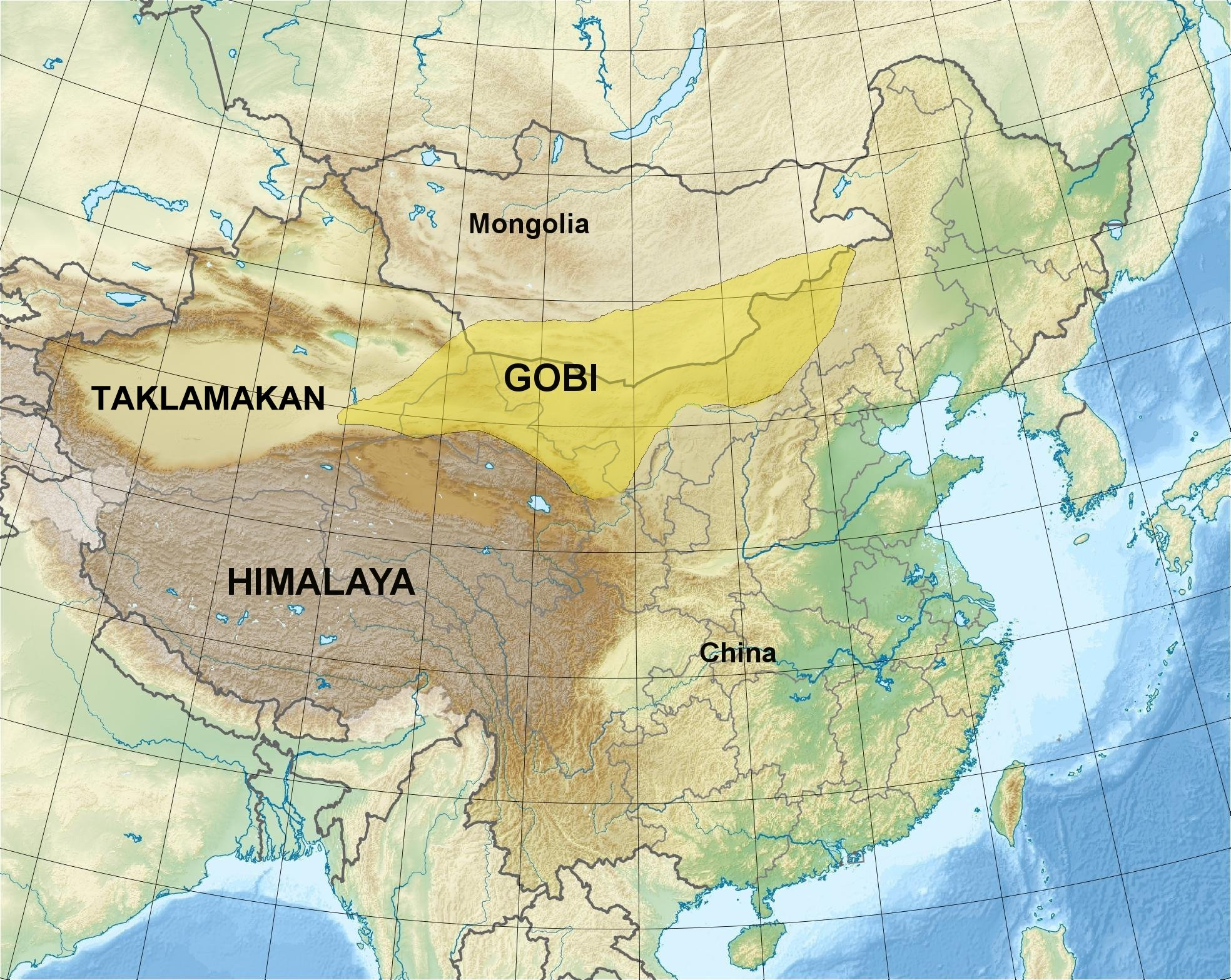
Most of Atkinson's travels were near the border of Siberia with Mongolia and present-day Kazakstan.

In St. Petersburg, John Fane, British Ambassador to Russia, assisted Atkinson to get the permission of Emperor Nicolas I for Atkinson to travel to the borders of the Russian Empire in Siberia and Central Asia. Nicolas gave Atkinson an ukase that allowed him to use, without cost to himself, Russian facilities for transportation and lodging, plus afforded him the protection of Cossacks stationed in the remote areas of the empire. This was given him despite Russian and British competition -- called The Great Game -- for influence in the interior of Asia. Fane suggested that Atkinson report on "points of political and commercial interest" (i.e. spy).

Atkinson left Moscow on 5 March 1847. A Russian speaking Englishman, Charles Edward Austin (1819-1893), accompanied him. (The Russian Governor of Siberia later accused Austin of being a spy.) The two Englishmen traveled by sleigh to Yekaterinburg, 1,400 km (870 miles) east of Moscow, on the eastern side of the Ural Mountains, arriving on March 18. Atkinson and Austin visited several mines in the Urals, then ventured eastward another 2,300 km (1,400 miles) to Badaun and from there south to the Altai Mountains on the border with Mongolia and hence to the steppes in what is now Kazakhstan.

Atkinson returned briefly to Moscow in February 1848 where on !8 March he married Lucy Sherrard Finley, an Englishwoman who was a governess in a noble Russian family in St Petersburg. He told her he was a widower but his first wife Rebecca was still alive in England. He had written many passionate letters to Lucy during his travels. The marriage appears to have been an enduring love match. She was also fluent in the Russian language -- which he was not -- which made her an asset as a traveling companion. Despite her gentile background, Lucy quickly adapted to the rigors of travel.

Two days after the marriage, the couple set off for Siberia. They traveled again to the Urals and the Altai Mountains and ventured into the steppe of present-day Kazakstan. In November 1848, Lucy had a baby in the town of Qapal, characterized by author Fielding: "It would be hard to find a more remote spot in the Russian Empire at this time." They named the child Alatau Tamchiboulac Atkinson in honor of his birthplace. The three soon continued their travels.

In Spring 1849, the Atkinsons followed the Kazakh tribes from their winter pastures near Lake Balkash to their summer pastures in the Djungar Alatau mountains, the first Europeans known to have visited this area. They spent the winter in Barnaul in Siberia. In summer 1850, the travled eastward to Irkutsk and Lake Baikal and visited gold mines in Krasnoyarsk. After wintering in Irkutsk, they were off again in 1851 into the remote eastern Sayan Mountains where they were probably the first Europeans to visit the immense Jom-Bolok volcanic field. They crossed the border into Chinese-controlled Mongolia to visit Lake Khövsgöl. They then explored Lake Baikal by boat. In the winter of 1851-1852, William settled his wife and child in Barnaul and continued his explorations of the Altai Mountains and ventured into Dzungaria and Mongolia. In 1853, the Atkinson's journeyed back to St. Petersburg where they would live for a few years as he worked on his paintings and his later books.

According to Atkinson, his travels totaled 29,000 miles (47,000 km), including 15,000 miles in carriages, 3,000 miles in boats, and 11,000 miles on horseback. As mentioned earlier, the ukase he was given by Nicolas I enabled him to use the resources of the Cossack posts scattered along the border of China and Russia. His aim in these expeditions was to sketch the scenery and people he encountered and he made 560 watercolours - some of them five feet across - and drawings. Many were of places that were unknown to Europeans. He kept journals of his explorations.

Atkinson was described as "an artistic traveller, thin, lithe, and sinewy, 'with a wrist like a rock and an eye like a poet's; manner singularly gentle, and air which mingled entreaty with command.'"

== Back to England ==
On his return to England in 1858 he published his first book, Oriental and Western Siberia: a Narrative of Seven Years' Explorations and Adventures in Siberia, Mongolia, the Kirghis Steppes, Chinese Tartary, and part of Central Asia. A second volume appeared two years later: Travels in the Regions of the Upper and Lower Amoor and the Russian Acquisitions on the Confines of India and China. This work was highly praised by the Athenæum on its publication, although it was later suggested - after his death in 1861 - that he had used material previously published in Russia in a book by Richard Maak in St Petersburg in 1859. In fact, Atkinson acknowledged his debt to Maak in the foreword to the book. Atkinson does not mention in either book that his second wife Lucy or his son Alatau had accompanied him on many of his travels.

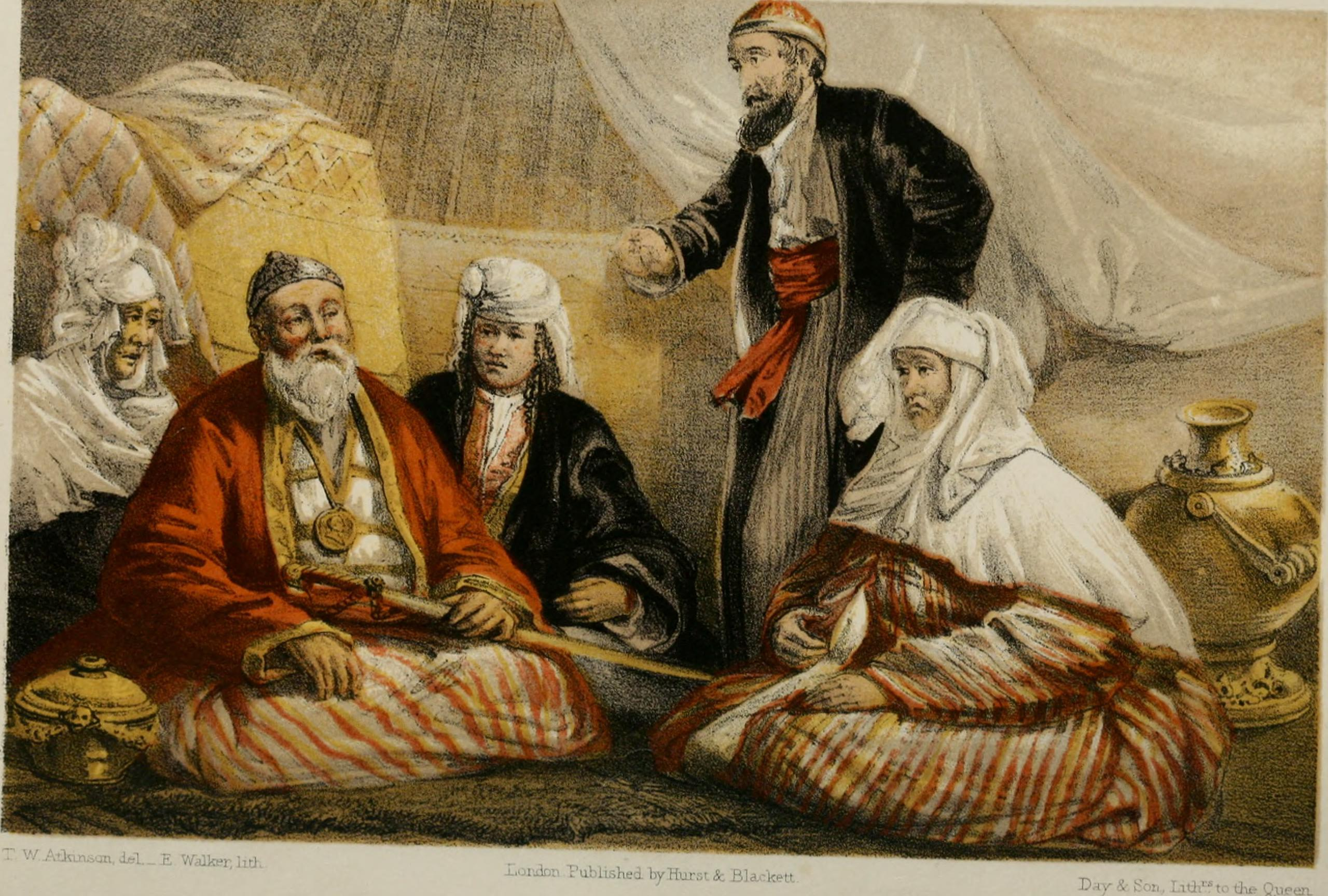
Atkinson's portrait of Sultan Souk, a Kazakh leader

Atkinson was much in demand as a speaker and in 1858 was granted a private audience with Queen Victoria at Windsor Castle. The same year Atkinson read a paper before the British Association On the Volcanoes of Central Asia. He was also elected a fellow of the Royal Geographical Society and in 1859 a fellow of the Geological Society and the Ethnographic Society. He was also elected to membership of the exclusive Geographical Club.

In May 1861, Atkinson was injured by being thrown from a horse-drawn omnibus. Lucy nursed him and reported that he had received a large emerald ring set in diamonds from the Tsar of Russia. Atkinson did not recover from the accident and died in Lower Walmer, Kent on 13 August 1861.

Of Atkinson's 560 water colours only 41 are known to have survived. Twelve are in the Hermitage Museum in Saint Petersburg and four in other locations in Russia; Four are in the Royal Geographical Society (which also holds his travel diaries), one in the Victoria and Albert Museum, and one in the Preston Museum in Preston, Lancashire. Two are in Athens and fifteen are in private British collections. Three paintings, one drawing and his book Oriental and Western Siberia were displayed at the Hidden Art of Barnsley Exhibition at the Cooper Gallery, Barnsley from June to August 2014 along with a map of his travels completed by children from Barnsley.

== Family and troubles ==
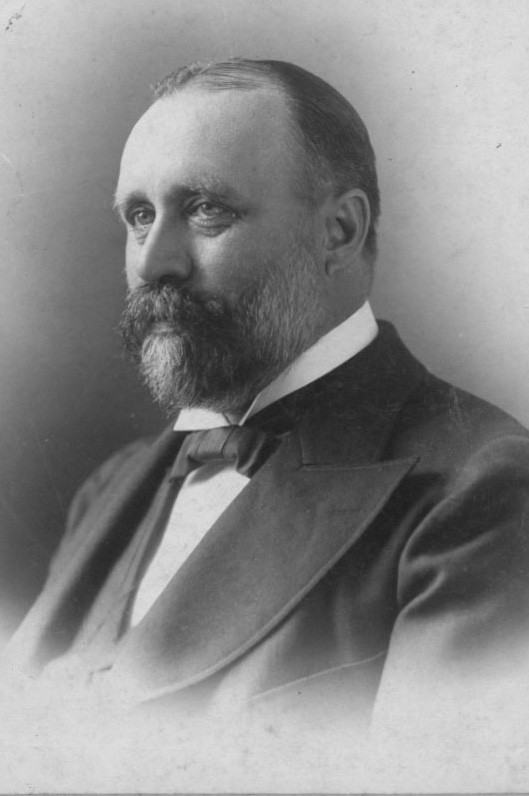
Portrait of Alatau Tamchiboulac Atkinson

Atkinson's financial problems, charges of plagiarism, and marriages to two women simultaneously affected his reputation as an explorer.

Atkinson's two wives were Rebecca Mercer who he married in 1819 and Lucy Finley who he married in 1848. In 1858, when Atkinson and Lucy returned to England, Rebecca was living as a pensioner in London. There is no evidence that the two women ever met each other. However, Rebecca's daughter by Atkinson, Martha, had married James Wheeler, a prominent attorney. After Atkinson's death in 1861, Wheeler began legal action to secure his estate for Rebecca. Lucy continued to call herself Mrs. Atkinson. Her financial difficulties and a sympathetic public led to her being granted two government pensions in recognition of her and Atkinson's geographical contributions. Alatau, her son, was educated at Rugby following a public subscription to pay his fees.

Lucy also wrote a book: Recollections of Tartar Steppes, about her travels with Thomas Atkinson. She died in 1893. In 1869, her son Alatau emigrated to Hawaii, where he became editor of the Hawaiian Gazette, director of education for the islands and later organizer of the territory's first census. He died in 1906.
