= Alatau T. Atkinson =

Hawaiian politician and journalist

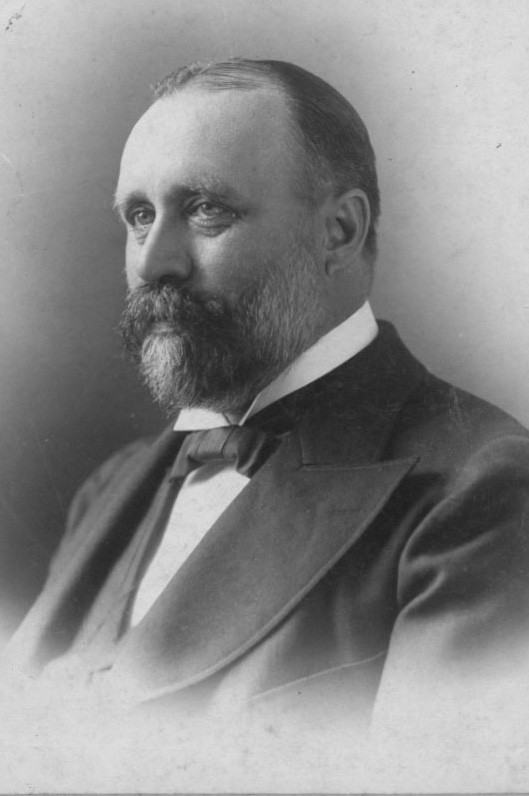

Territory of Hawaii Superintendent of Public Instruction
- In office September 6, 1900 – April 1905
- Governor: Sanford B. Dole

Republic of Hawaii House of Representatives
- In office February 16, 1898 – July 7, 1898
- President: Sanford B. Dole

General Superintendent of the Census
- In office 1896–1896

Inspector General of Schools
- In office 1893–1898

Kingdom of Hawaii Inspector General of Schools
- In office 1891–1893
- Monarch: Liliʻuokalani
- In office 1887–1891
- Monarch: Kalākaua

Personal details
- Born: Alatau Tamchiboulac Atkinson; November 16, 1848 Qapal, Russian Empire
- Died: April 24, 1906 (aged 57) Honolulu
- Resting place: Oahu Cemetery, Hawaii.
- Spouse: Annie Humble
- Children: 7
- Parents: Thomas Witlam Atkinson (father); Lucy Atkinson (mother)
- Education: Rugby School
- Occupation: Educator

Alatau Tamchiboulac Atkinson (November 4, 1848 – April 24, 1906) was a member of the House of Representatives for the Republic of Hawaii. He served as Superintendent of Public Instruction for the Territory of Hawaii following annexation to the United States. Appointed Inspector General of Schools for the Kingdom of Hawaii, he served under the administrations of Kalākaua and Liliʻuokalani, and continued in the position under the Provisional Government of Hawaii and the Republic of Hawaii . A journalist and newspaper owner, he is believed to have been one of two authors of satirical works lampooning Walter Murray Gibson's cabinet regime under Kalākaua. Atkinson Drive in the Ala Moana area of Honolulu, was named to honor him.

== Background ==
He was born in the small town of Qapal in the Kazakh steppes of Central Asia, which was then part of the Russian Empire, to British explorers Lucy Atkinson and Thomas Witlam Atkinson, who named him after the famous Tamshybulak Spring in Qapal and the Alatau Mountains (Tien Shan), and spent the first ten years of his life in various areas of the Russian Empire, such as Siberia, Central Asia, and St Petersburg.

After his father's death in Kent, England, when Alatau was ten years old, a public fund-raising appeal by Sir Roderick Murchison, President of the Royal Geographical Society, helped finance Alatau's education at Rugby School. After a brief career in the Russian Empire as Secretary of the Turko-Russian boundary commission, he changed careers to become a writer for the British newspaper Newcastle Courant. He briefly held a teaching position in England at Durham School.

== Hawaii's school system ==
An 1854 treaty for Hawaii's annexation to the United States had been submitted to Kamehameha III, but he never signed it. During the 1863–1872 reign of Kamehameha V, the Hawaiian language was still the predominant communication in Hawaii's schools. Increasing exposure to the outside world was being brought by the sea trade, missionaries, and foreigners operating sugar plantations in the islands. In 1867, a proposed reciprocity treaty, tax relief for sugar planters, had gotten as far as the United States Congress, but was defeated in the Senate.

Atkinson was offered a position by Bishop Thomas Nettleship Staley in 1868, to become instructor and principal at St. Alban's College in Pauoa, Hawaii. He left England together with his wife Annie (née Humble) and his infant daughter Zoe in 1869 for the long sea journey to Hawaii. St. Alban's would later merge with ʻIolani School. One of his famous pupils was Sun Yat Sen who brought democracy to China. Atkinson would later also be given charge of the Fort Street School. He believed that fluency in a common language used by the outside world would be a vital necessity for the coming generations of Hawaiians. It became his life's career to convert Hawaii's schools into using English as the predominant language.

In 1887 he was appointed Inspector General of Schools for the Kingdom of Hawaii, serving under both Kalākaua and Liliʻuokalani. He remained in that position under Dole during the Republic of Hawaii. When Hawaii became a territory, Atkinson was appointed Superintendent of Public Instruction.

== Elected representative ==
Atkinson represented the Fourth District of Hawaii in the Legislature of the Republic of Hawaii for the February 16 – July 7, 1898, session. Hawaii was annexed by the United States on August 12, 1898.

== Writing ==
He was editor of the Hawaiian Gazette, and was president of Hawaiian Star Newspaper Association. Atkinson and/or Vice Chamberlain Edward William Purvis are believed to have been the authors of The Grand Duke of Gynbergdrinkenstein, a three-act burlesque originally published in 1886 as a satirical jab at Kalākaua's cabinet under the helm of Walter M. Gibson. The character of Herr Von Boss was believed to have been wealthy sugar baron Claus Spreckels. A second version was published in 1887 as The Gynberg Ballads. British Commissioner James Hay Wodehouse believed the satire rang true to the king's cabinet under Gibson, and made sure numerous officials in London received copies.

== Government reports ==
- Atkinson, Alatau T. (Alatau Tamchiboulac) (1896). "The Hawaiian Islands, their resources, agricultural, commercial and financial. Coffee, the coming staple product". Honolulu, Hawaiian Gazette co – via Internet Archive.
- Atkinson, Alatau T. (Alatau Tamchiboulac) (1897). "The Hawaiian Islands, their resources, agricultural, commercial and financial". Washington, D.C., Gibson Bros., printers – via Internet Archive.
- Atkinson, Alatau T. (Alatau Tamchiboulac) (1897). "Report of the general superintendent of the census, 1896". Honolulu, Hawaiian Star Press – via Internet Archive.

== Personal life ==
Atkinson married Annie Humble in England in January 1868. They sailed to Hawaii in 1869, by way of Panama and San Francisco. He died April 24, 1906, as a result of a series of strokes after a lengthy illness. Upon his death, all schools were closed in his honor. Atkinson Drive in the Ala Moana area of Honolulu is named for him. Annie Atkinson died of pneumonia in 1911.

The couple had four daughters and three sons:

1. Zoe Lucy Sherrard Alatau Atkinson (1868–1940) was their only child born in England; all her brothers and sisters were born in Hawaii. She became a teacher at the Royal School in Hawaii. Zoe married scientist Robert Cyril Layton Perkins in 1901, and the couple permanently moved to England after their wedding.

2. Alatau Leonard Charles (Jack) Atkinson (1871–1927) was appointed to the US presidential cabinet post of Secretary of Hawaii in 1903 by Theodore Roosevelt. During an extended absence of territorial governor George R. Carter, Jack Atkinson became Acting Governor of the Territory of Hawaii. As a youth, he enlisted in the Honolulu Rifles. A graduate of Yale Law School and the University of Michigan, he maintained a law practice in Honolulu, and was active in the Republican Party. He married Ina Marie Taft of Chicago in 1921.

3. Edith Kapiolani (Lani) Atkinson (c. 1871– 1959) married British naval officer Captain Frederick Kenrick Colquhoun Gibbons in 1895 and permanently relocated to England.

4. May (Maisie) Kathleen Atkinson (1874–1923) married Arthur M. Brown in 1897, future high sheriff of the Territory of Hawaii.

5. Molly (Ethel Mary) Alatau Atkinson (1875–1931) married Samuel Gardner Wilder Jr. in 1896.

6. Robert Witlam Atkinson (1877–1939) was co-founder, along with Walter F. Dillingham, of Hawaiian Dredging. In 1907, he married Helen (Nellie) Kitchen and was widowed in 1917. Two years later, he married Helen's widowed sister Alice Mackee Kitchen Schultz. His wives were granddaughters of sugar planter James Makee.

7. Kenneth Alatau Atkinson (1885–1953) relocated to New South Wales, Australia where he spent the rest of his life in a variety of occupations.

== Aftermath ==
- Fort Street School was renamed President William McKinley High School in 1907, and was listed on the National Register of Historic Places listings on Oahu on August 11, 1980.

== Bibliography ==
- Atkinson, Alatau Tamchiboulac; Purvis, Edward William (1886). The Grand Duke of Gynbergdrinkenstein. Honolulu. OCLC 16338005.
- Atkinson, Alatau Tamchiboulac; Purvis, Edward William (1887). The Gynberg Ballads. San Francisco: Schmidt Lithograph Co. OCLC 978697438 – via HathiTrust.
- Lydecker, Robert Colfax, ed. (1918). Roster Legislatures of Hawaii, 1841–1918. Honolulu: Hawaiian Gazette Company. OCLC 60737418.
- Kuykendall, Ralph Simpson (1953). The Hawaiian Kingdom 1854–1874, Twenty Critical Years. Vol. 2. Honolulu: University of Hawaii Press. ISBN 978-0-87022-432-4. OCLC 47010821.
- Kuykendall, Ralph Simpson (1967). The Hawaiian Kingdom 1874–1893, The Kalakaua Dynasty. Vol. 3. Honolulu: University of Hawaii Press. ISBN 978-0-87022-433-1. OCLC 500374815.
