= List of shipwrecks in November 1851 =

The list of shipwrecks in November 1851 includes ships sunk, foundered, wrecked, grounded, or otherwise lost during November 1851.

== 1 November ==
List of shipwrecks: 1 November 1851
Ship	State	Description
Freundschaft	Bremen	The ship was driven ashore on Wangeroog, Kingdom of Hanover. Her crew were rescued. She was on a voyage from a Norwegian port to Bremen.
Geblena Maria	Netherlands	The ship was lost off "Tytters", Russia. Two people were reported to have been rescued. She was on a voyage from Kronstadt, Russia to Amsterdam, North Holland.
John and Mary	United Kingdom	The smack sprang a leak and was beached at Rhyl, Denbighshire. Her crew were rescued.
Ruby	United Kingdom	The ship ran aground in the Pakri Islands, Russia. She was on a voyage from Kronstadt to Dundee, Forfarshire. She was later refloated and taken into "Baltic Port", where she ran aground.
Stettin	Stettin	The steamship ran aground at the entrance to the Stettin Lagoon. She was on a voyage from Königsberg, Prussia to Stettin.
Suomalainen	Russia	The brig capsized at Buenos Aires, Argentina. Her crew were rescued. She was righted the next day.
Tapperheten	Sweden	The schooner ran aground on the Gashalsgrund. Her crew were rescued.

== 2 November ==
List of shipwrecks: 2 November 1851
Ship	State	Description
Alert, and Samuels and Eliza	United Kingdom	The schooner Alert collided with the sloop Samuels and Eliza in the North Sea between Cromer, Norfolk and the Dudgeon Sandbank. Both vessels sank, with the loss of the captain of Samuels and Eliza. Survivors were rescued by Uncle Billy (United Kingdom).
Jem	United Kingdom	The ship was in collision with another vessel and sank in the North Sea off Flamborough Head, Yorkshire. Her crew were rescued by Bounty (United Kingdom). Jem was on a voyage from South Shields, County Durham to Jersey, Channel Islands.
John Hector	United Kingdom	The ship ran aground on a reef south west of Anholt, Denmark. Her crew were rescued. She was on a voyage from Riga, Russia to London.
Josephine	France	The ship was wrecked on the north coast of Jersey, Channel Islands with the loss of a crew member. She was on a voyage from Cherbourg, Seine-Inférieure to Saint-Malo, Ille-et-Vilaine.
	United Kingdom	The ship was driven ashore and severely damaged at Fraserburgh, Aberdeenshire. She was on a voyage from Belfast, County Antrim to Arkhangelsk, Russia.
Phœbe	United Kingdom	The steamship ran aground at Gibraltar. She was refloated with assistance from HMS Janus (Royal Navy) and the steamship Nile (United Kingdom).
Pylades	Sweden	The ship was driven ashore on the coast of Denmark. She was on a voyage from Stockholm to Rio de Janeiro, Brazil. She was refloated and put into Helsingør, Denmark.
Splendid Lass	(United Kingdom of Great Britain and Ireland) British North America	The ship was wrecked at Cape Hinchinbrooke. She was on a voyage from Newfoundland to Prince Edward Island.

== 3 November ==
List of shipwrecks: 3 November 1851
Ship	State	Description
Ahti	(Russian Empire) Grand Duchy of Finland	The ship ran aground on the Swinebottoms, in the Baltic Sea. She was on a voyage from Liverpool, Lancashire, United Kingdom to Vaasa. She was refloated and taken into Helsingør, Denmark.
Empire State	United States	The steamboat struck the pier and sank in the Niagara River at Buffalo, New York.
Esther	United Kingdom	The ship was driven ashore at Richibucto, New Brunswick, British North America. She was on a voyage from Cartagena, Spain to Richibucto.
Fleur de Marie	France	The ship ran aground on Scroby Sands, Norfolk, United Kingdom. She was on a voyage from Rouen, Seine-Inférieure to Newcastle upon Tyne, Northumberland, United Kingdom. She was refloated and taken into Great Yarmouth, Norfolk in a leaky condition.
Hydrus	United Kingdom	The ship ran aground on the Holm Sand, in the North Sea off the coast of Suffolk. She was on a voyage from Cardiff, Glamorgan to Lowestoft, Suffolk. She was refloated and taken into Lowestoft.
Industrie	France	The sloop was abandoned in the Bay of Biscay off Bayonne, Basses-Pyrénées. Her crew drowned making for the shore. She was on a voyage from Morlaix, Finistère to Bayonne.
Isabella	United Kingdom	The ship was driven ashore at Helsingør, Denmark. She was on a voyage from Saint Petersburg, Russia to Hull, Yorkshire.

== 4 November ==
List of shipwrecks: 4 November 1851
Ship	State	Description
Frau Henderika	Stralsund	The ship ran aground and sank off "Fredericksort", Prussia. She was on a voyage from Stralsund to Rochester, Kent, United Kingdom.
Neptunus	Lübeck	The ship ran aground on the Furusand. She was on a voyage from Skellefteå to Lübeck.
New Amity	United Kingdom	The ship was driven ashore at Scheveningen, South Holland, Netherlands. Her crew were rescued. She was on a voyage from London to Rotterdam, South Holland. She had become a wreck by 7 November.
Pink	United Kingdom	The brig was wrecked on the south coast of Ascension Island. Her crew were rescued.
Sartor	Norway	The galiot was driven ashore at Helsingør, Denmark. She was on a voyage from Gävle, Sweden to Hull, Yorkshire. She was refloated on 10 November and put into Helsingør, where she was condemned.
Stad Antwerpen	Belgium	The ship was driven ashore in the Scheldt near the Pipe de Tabac. She was on a voyage from Antwerp to Akyab, Malaya. She was refloated.
Urwen	Russia	The ship was driven ashore and wrecked on the east coast of Öland, Sweden. She was on a voyage from Saint Petersburg to London.

== 5 November ==
List of shipwrecks: 5 November 1851
Ship	State	Description
Abd-el-Kader	Trieste	The ship ran aground on Taylor's Bank, in Liverpool Bay. She was on a voyage from Liverpool, Lancashire, United Kingdom to Trieste. She was refloated and towed back to Liverpool by the tug Wallace (United Kingdom).
Anna	Sweden	The ship was driven ashore at Maldon, Essex, United Kingdom. She was on a voyage from Maldon to Middlesbrough, Yorkshire, United Kingdom. She had been refloated by 9 November.
Elizabeth	United Kingdom	The barque was wrecked on the Horse Bank, in Liverpool Bay. Her crew were rescued by the Formby Lightship ( Trinity House). She was on a voyage from Liverpool to Maranhão, Brazil.
Hannah	United Kingdom	The ship was driven ashore and wrecked at Karlskrona, Sweden. She was on a voyage from Pillau, Prussia to Leith, Lothian.
Lady Emily	United Kingdom	The tug suffered a boiler explosion and sank in the River Avon at Brislington, Gloucestershire with the loss of all four crew.
Leonie	France	The ship was wrecked near Mardyk, Nord. Her crew were rescued. She was on a voyage from Dunkirk, Nord to Marseille, Bouches-du-Rhône.
Mayflower	United Kingdom	The brig was driven ashore near Ottendord, Duchy of Holstein. She was refloated on 20 November and taken into Cuxhaven.
Sally	United Kingdom	The schooner was wrecked on Scharhörn. Her crew were rescued. She was on a voyage from Liverpool, Lancashire to Husum, Duchy of Holstein.
Yannah	United Kingdom	The ship ran aground and was wrecked. She was on a voyage from Karlskrona, Sweden to Leith, Lothian.

== 6 November ==
List of shipwrecks: 6 November 1851
Ship	State	Description
Aghia Peresvi	Flag unknown	The ship was driven ashore in Carlingford Lough. She was refloated and resumed her voyage.
Arcadian	(United Kingdom of Great Britain and Ireland) British North America	The ship was driven ashore and wrecked at Black River, Jamaica.
Correo	United Kingdom	The steamship sprang a leak and was beached in Carnarvon Bay. She was on a voyage from Liverpool, Lancashire to Rio de Janeiro, Brazil. She was refloated and taken into Caernarfon.
Dispute, and Sultana	Sweden; United Kingdom	The brig Dispute collided with Sultana in the North Sea off the Owers Sandbank and sank. Her crew were rescued. Dispute was on a voyage from Newcastle upon Tyne, Northumberland, United Kingdom to Mallorca, Spain. Sultana was abandoned; her crew were rescued. She was on a voyage from Newcastle upon Tyne to Genoa, Kingdom of Sardinia.
Drie Vrienden	Netherlands	The ship ran aground off Juist, Kingdom of Hanover. Her crew were rescued. She was on a voyage from Kragerø, Norway to Delfzijl, Groningen.
Eugenie	France	The ship was driven ashore at Helsingør, Denmark. She was on a voyage from Riga, Russia to Bordeaux, Gironde.
Helene	Stralsund	The galeas was abandoned in the Dogger Bank. Her crew were rescued. She was on a voyage from Newport, Monmouthshire, United Kingdom to Stettin.
Londonderry	United Kingdom	The ship ran aground off Neuwerk. She was on a voyage from Hamburg to Hartlepool, County Durham. She was refloated on 7 December and towed into Cuxhaven.
Paragon	United Kingdom	The ship capsized off Helsinki, Grand Duchy of Finland. She was taken into Svendborg, Denmark on 16 December and righted.
Phœnix	Norway	The schooner ran aground on the Herd Sand, in the North Sea off the coast of County Durham. She was on a voyage from South Shields, County Durham to Christiansand. She broke up on 24 November.
Pink	United Kingdom	The ship was lost off Santos, Brazil. Four of her crew were rescued, the remainder were reported missing. She was on a voyage from the Rio Grande to Liverpool.
St. Lawrence	(United Kingdom of Great Britain and Ireland) British North America	The steamship was in collision with the steamship Britannia ( (United Kingdom of Great Britain and Ireland) British North America and sank in Lake St. Louis. All on board were rescued.
Tweelingen	Netherlands	The ship was driven ashore near "Isphoved", Denmark. She was on a voyage from Dokkum, Friesland to Fredericia, Denmark.

== 7 November ==
List of shipwrecks: 7 November 1851
Ship	State	Description
Alida	Netherlands	The ship ran aground on the Westerplaat, in the North Sea off the coast of Zeeland. She was on a voyage from Groningen to Antwerp, Belgium.
Gott Mit Uns	Bremen	The barque was driven ashore and wrecked on Öland, Sweden.
Maine	United States	The ship was driven ashore at Brouwershaven, Zeeland. She was on a voyage from Baltimore, Maryland to Antwerp.
Patriot	France	The ship was driven ashore at Le Tréport, Seine-Inférieure. She was refloated the next day and taken into Le Tréport.
Pursuit	United Kingdom	The ship was driven ashore on Crane Island, Province of Canada, British North America. She was on a voyage from Quebec city, Province of Canada to Liverpool, Lancashire. She was refloated and put back to Quebec City.
Twee Gebroeders	Netherlands	The galiot foundered in the North Sea 15 nautical miles (28 km) off Wells-next-the-Sea, Norfolk. Her crew survived.
Undaunted	United Kingdom	The brig ran aground and was severely damaged on the West Rocks, in the North Sea off the coast of Essex. She was on a voyage from Sunderland, County Durham, to Rotterdam, South Holland, Netherlands. She was refloated the next day and taken into Harwich, Essex.

== 8 November ==
List of shipwrecks: 8 November 1851
Ship	State	Description
Augusta Cathinka	Danzig	The ship ran aground on the Puttgarten Reef. She was on a voyage from Danzig to "Pappenhall". She had become a wreck by 20 November.
Britannia	United Kingdom	The ship departed from Gaspé, Province of Canada, British North America for Naples, Kingdom of the Two Sicilies. No further trace, presumed foundered with the loss of all hands.
Catherine	United Kingdom	The brig ran aground at Corkbeg, County Cork. She was on a voyage from Demerara, British Guiana to Liverpool, Lancashire.
Harvest Home	United Kingdom	The ship was wrecked at Conway, Caernarfonshire. Her crew were rescued. She was on a voyage from Portmadoc, Caernarfonshire to Runcorn, Cheshire.
Hindostan	United Kingdom	The paddle steamer ran aground at Mud Point, in the Hooghly River. She was later refloated.

== 9 November ==
List of shipwrecks: 9 November 1851
Ship	State	Description
Boreas	Stettin	The ship sprang a leak and was abandoned in the North Sea. Her crew were rescued by Euphemia (United Kingdom). Boreas was on a voyage from Grangemouth, Stirlingshire, United Kingdom to Stettin.
Pollux	(Russian Empire) Grand Duchy of Finland	The barque ran aground on the Gore Reef, in the Bristol Channel off Barnstaple, Devon, United Kingdom. She capsized and was abandoned. She was anchored off Clovelly, Devon, but subsequently driven ashore and was later wrecked. Pollux was on a voyage from Dublin, United Kingdom, to Alexandria, Egypt.
Unicorn	United Kingdom	The ship was abandoned in the Atlantic Ocean. One hundred and thirty-five passengers were rescued by the brig Harriet (United States), captained by Levi Marston. The remaining 175 passengers, and her crew were rescued by Daniel Webster (United States). Unicorn was on a voyage from Liverpool, Lancashire to Saint John, New Brunswick, British North America.

== 10 November ==
List of shipwrecks: 10 November 1851
Ship	State	Description
Flora	Norway	The ship was driven ashore and severely damaged on the coast of Northumberland. She was on a voyage from Arendal to Leith, Lothian, United Kingdom. She was refloated and towed into Warkworth, Northumberland, United Kingdom.
Jessy	United Kingdom	The ship ran aground and was severely damaged in the River Shannon at Meelick, County Galway. She was on a voyage from Quebec City, Province of Canada, British North America to Limerick. She was refloated the next day.
Three Sisters	United Kingdom	The ship was lost at the mouth of the Paraíba River, Brazil.
Varuna	Russia	The ship was driven ashore on the Tendra Spit. She was refloated on 13 November and towed into Odesa.
Victoria	United Kingdom	The ship departed from Saint John, New Brunswick, British North America for Galway. No further trace, presumed foundered with the loss of all hands.

== 11 November ==
List of shipwrecks: 11 November 1851
Ship	State	Description
Christian Charlotte	Danzig	The ship ran aground on Læsø, Denmark. She was on a voyage from Danzig to London, United Kingdom. She was refloated and taken into Frederikshavn, Denmark for repairs.
Demerara	United Kingdom	Demerara The paddle steamer ran aground in the River Avon and broke her back. She was being towed from Bristol, Gloucestershire to Glasgow, Renfrewshire to have her engines fitted. Demerara was refloated and taken into Bristol. She was declared a total loss.
Sovereign	United Kingdom	The sloop sprang a leak and sank 6 nautical miles (11 km) off Mousa, Shetland Islands. Her crew were rescued by the schooner Matchless (United Kingdom. Sovereign was on a voyage from Lerwick, Shetland Islands to Wick, Caithness.

== 12 November ==
List of shipwrecks: 12 November 1851
Ship	State	Description
Amy Ann	United Kingdom	The ship ran aground in Lake St. Peter. She was on a voyage from Quebec City and Montreal, Province of Canada, British North America to Liverpool, Lancashire.
Arthur	United Kingdom	The ship was abandoned in the North Sea. She was on a voyage from Danzig to London. She came ashore at Harboøre, Denmark.
Juno	United Kingdom	The ship ran aground and was wrecked on the San Philippe shoals, off Mahón, Spain.
Republic	Bremen	The whaler was driven ashore at New Romney, Kent, United Kingdom. She was on a voyage from Bremen to the South Seas. She was refloated.

== 13 November ==
List of shipwrecks: 13 November 1851
Ship	State	Description
Adele	United Kingdom	The ship was wrecked on the Alecrans. She was on a voyage from Belize City, British Honduras to London.
Barron	United Kingdom	The ship was wrecked on a reef off Borkum, Kingdom of Hanover. Her crew were rescued. She was on a voyage from Sunderland, County Durham, to Hamburg.
Canova	United Kingdom	The brig was driven ashore in the Schulpengat. She was on a voyage from Sunderland to Amsterdam, North Holland, Netherlands. She was refloated and taken into the Nieuw Diep.
Davids	United Kingdom	The sloop was driven ashore at Goswick, Northumberland. She was refloated on 10 December and taken into Lindisfarne, Northumberland.
Joseph Lee Archer	(United Kingdom of Great Britain and Ireland) New South Wales	The cutter was wrecked at Yankalilla, South Australia. Her crew were rescued.
Mary Ann	United Kingdom	The ship was wrecked on "Kangdang Island", Netherlands East Indies. All on board were rescued. She was on a voyage from Shanghai, China to Sydney, New South Wales.
Wanderer	United Kingdom	The yacht ran aground off Port Macquarie.

== 14 November ==
List of shipwrecks: 14 November 1851
Ship	State	Description
Annyade	Brazil	The brigantine sank at Faial Island, Azores. Her crew were ashore.
Conqueror	United Kingdom	The ship was driven ashore south of Dragør, Denmark. She was on a voyage from Memel, Prussia to Sunderland, County Durham. She was refloated.
Sarah and Ellen	United Kingdom	The ship was driven ashore at Seaton Carew, County Durham. Her crew were rescued by the West Hartlepool Lifeboat. She was on a voyage from London to Hartlepool, County Durham.
Sythe	United Kingdom	The brig ran aground on the Holm Sand, in the North Sea off the coast of Suffolk. She was on a voyage from Sunderland, County Durham, to London. She was refloated and towed into Lowestoft, Suffolk, where she was beached.
Z. B.	United States	The ship ran aground on the Foreness Rock, Margate, Kent, United Kingdom. She was on a voyage from Stockholm, Sweden to New York. She was refloated and taken into Ramsgate, Kent.

== 15 November ==
List of shipwrecks: 15 November 1851
Ship	State	Description
Augustin	Papal States	The ship was wrecked on Minorca, Spain. She was on a voyage from Civitavecchia to Algiers, Algeria.
Cruz	Portugal	The brig was driven ashore and wrecked on Faial Island, Azores.
Harbinger	United States	The brig was driven ashore and wrecked on Faial Island.
Providentia	Brazil	The barque was wrecked on Terceira Island, Azores.
Rival	(United Kingdom of Great Britain and Ireland) British North America	The ship was wrecked on a reef south west of Governors Island, Prince Edward Island. She was on a voyage from Shediac, New Brunswick to the Clyde.
Tay	United Kingdom	The ship struck a sunken rock at Valparaíso, Chile and was damaged. She was on a voyage from Papudo to Valparaíso.

== 16 November ==
List of shipwrecks: 16 November 1851
Ship	State	Description
Carioca	United States	The ship was abandoned in the Atlantic Ocean. All on board were rescued by Vanguard (United Kingdom). Carioca was on a voyage from the Clyde to New York.
Edward	United Kingdom	The smack was driven ashore and wrecked at Cairnbulg, Aberdeenshire with the loss of all hands. She was on a voyage from Lerwick, Shetland Islands to Glasgow, Renfrewshire.
Eliza	United Kingdom	The ship ran aground on the Sizewell Bank, in the North Sea off the coast of Suffolk. She was on a voyage from Sunderland, County Durham, to Saint-Malo, Ille-et-Vilaine, France. She was refloated and put into Ramsgate, Kent in a leaky condition.
Frau Maria	Hamburg	The ship ran aground on the Newcombe Sand, in the North Sea off the coast of Suffolk. She floated off but consequently sank. Her crew were rescued by Mayville (United Kingdom). Frau Maria was on a voyage from Great Yarmouth, Norfolk, United Kingdom to Hamburg.
James	United Kingdom	The ship was abandoned in the North Sea. Her crew were rescued by Commandeur (Hamburg). James was on a voyage from Cardiff, Glamorgan to Hamburg.
Junge Geerd	Kingdom of Hanover	The ship sank off Juist. Her crew were rescued.
Rover	United Kingdom	The paddle steamer ran aground at Londonderry. She was on a voyage from Londonderry to Glasgow, Renfrewshire.
Vesta	United Kingdom	The steamship foundered in the North Sea off the mouth of the Humber. Her sixteen crew were rescued by the steamship Norfolk (United Kingdom). Vesta was on a voyage from Sunderland, County Durham, to Hamburg.
Ville de Grasse	France	The steamship collided with the steamship Ville de Paris (France) and foundered in the Mediterranean Sea off the Îles d'Hyères, Var with some loss of lif. Survivors were rescued by Nantes (France) and Ville de Paris. Ville de Grasse was on a voyage from Cette, Hérault to Nice, Alpes-Maritimes.

== 17 November ==
List of shipwrecks: 17 November 1851
Ship	State	Description
Ambroisin	Norway	The ship was driven ashore at Mardyck, Nord, France. Her crew were rescued. She was on a voyage from Skien to Paimbœuf, Loire-Inférieure, France.
Beaver	United Kingdom	The brig was driven ashore and wrecked at Zandwyk, North Holland, Netherlands.
Carib	United Kingdom	The schooner was in collision with a brig and foundered off the coast of Yorkshire. Her crew were rescued.
City of Limerick	United Kingdom	The steamship ran aground at Dublin. She was on a voyage from London to Dublin. She was refloated.
Concezione	Kingdom of Sardinia	The brig was driven ashore and severely damaged on St. Clement's Isle, Cornwall, United Kingdom. Her crew were rescued. She was on a voyage from London to Newport, Monmouthshire, United Kingdom. She was refloated the next day and towed into Penzance, Cornwall.
Eclipse	United Kingdom	The ship departed from Rio de Janeiro, Empire of Brazil for Cowes, Isle of Wight. No further trace, presumed foundered with the loss of all hands.
Edward	United Kingdom	The ship was driven ashore and wrecked at Fraserburgh, Aberdeenshire with the loss of all hands. She was on a voyage from Lerwick, Shetland Islands to Glasgow, Renfrewshire.
Frau Sophia	Flag unknown	The ship was driven ashore at West Hartlepool, County Durham, United Kingdom. She had become a wreck by 25 November.
Fearful	United Kingdom	The ship was driven ashore at Southsea Castle, Hampshire. She was on a voyage from Hartlepool, County Durham to Portsmouth, Hampshire. She was refloated and taken into Portsmouth.
Francis	France	The ship was driven ashore and wrecked at Batz-sur-Mer, Loire-Inférieure. Her crew were rescued. She was on a voyage from Saint Petersburg, Russia to Nantes, Loire-Inférieure.
Jane	United Kingdom	The ship was lost at the mouth of the Rio Grande. Her crew were rescued. She was on a voyage from Liverpool, Lancashire to the Rio Grande.
Margaret's	United Kingdom	The brig was in collision with the steamship Metropolitan (United Kingdom) and was abandoned in the English Channel off the Isle of Wight. Her crew were rescued by Metropolitan. Margaret's was on a voyage from Limerick to London.
Martello	Norway	The tug was holed by ice and put into Randers, Denmark in a sinking condition. She was repaired.
Radical	United Kingdom	The ship was holed by her anchor and sank in the River Thames. Her crew were rescued. She was on a voyage from Sunderland, County Durham, to London. She was refloated on 19 November and towed into London.
St. Leonard	(United Kingdom of Great Britain and Ireland) Guernsey	The smack was destroyed by fire off Cap La Hogue, Manche, France. Her crew survived. She was on a voyage from Guernsey to London.

== 18 November ==
List of shipwrecks: November 1851
Ship	State	Description
Bonne Melida	France	The ship was wrecked on the Minquiers, in the Channel Islands. Her crew were rescued. She was on a voyage from Bordeaux, Gironde to Le Havre, Seine-Inférieure.
Brudgommen	Norway	The ship was driven ashore and wrecked on Deget, Denmark. Her crew were rescued. She was on a voyage from Randers to Sandefjord.
Gezina	Netherlands	The ship was wrecked off "Madsbøll", Denmark with the loss of her captain. She was on a voyage from Riga, Russia to Amsterdam, North Holland.
Lord Clarendon	United Kingdom	The ship was driven ashore. She was on a voyage from Sydney, Nova Scotia, British North America to Liverpool, Lancashire.
Union	United Kingdom	The ship was abandoned in the North Sea off the coast of Lincolnshire. She was on a voyage from South Shields, County Durham to Dieppe, Seine-Inférieure, France. She was taken into King's Lynn, Norfolk the next day.

== 19 November ==
List of shipwrecks: 19 November 1851
Ship	State	Description
Anton	Lübeck	The ship was driven ashore at Zingst, Kingdom of Prussia. She was on a voyage from Saint Petersburg, Russia to Lübeck.
Hoppes	Hamburg	The ship was driven ashore on the east coast of Heligoland. All on board were rescued. She was on a voyage from Hamburg to Gothenburg, Sweden.
Lady of the Isles	United Kingdom	The ship was in collision with the schooner Belmira (Portugal) and was abandoned off Faial Island, Azores. She subsequently drove ashore.
Tigendenage	United States	The ship was wrecked in the Saint Lawrence River. Her crew were rescued the next day by the schooner St. Helena (United Kingdom). Tigendendenage was on a voyage from Quebec City, Province of Canada, British North America to London, United Kingdom.
Tom Bowling	United Kingdom	The brig was driven ashore and wrecked at Padstow, Cornwall.

== 20 November ==
List of shipwrecks: 20 November 1851
Ship	State	Description
Anna	France	The ship was wrecked on the Talbot Rocks. She was on a voyage from Pontrieux, Côtes du Nord to Le Havre, Seine-Inférieure.
Camille	France	The ship was driven ashore at Caen, Calvados.
Emma	United Kingdom	The schooner ran aground on the Burbo Bank, in Liverpool Bay, capsized and was wrecked with the loss of thirteen of the fourteen people on board. She was on a voyage from Newfoundland, British North America to Liverpool, Lancashire.
Eugene	France	The ship ran aground and sank off Mardyk, Nord. She was on a voyage from Dunkirk, Nord to Carentan, Manche.
Pomona	United Kingdom	The brig was in collision with the schooner Gipsy King (United Kingdom) and was abandoned in the Irish Sea 30 nautical miles (56 km) north west of Black Combe, Cumberland. Her crew were rescued by the fishing boat Valentine (United Kingdom). Pomona was on a voyage from Whitehaven, Cumberland to Dublin.
Twendre Brodre	Norway	The ship ran aground off Scharhörn. She was refloated and put into Cuxhaven in a leaky condition.
Voyageur	France	The ship sprang a leak and was beached at the Old Head of Kinsale, County Cork, United Kingdom, where she was wrecked. She was on a voyage from Galaţi, Ottoman Empire to Queenstown, County Cork and Tralee, County Kerry, United Kingdom.

== 21 November ==
List of shipwrecks: 21 November 1851
Ship	State	Description
Akke-Boon	Prussia	The ship was driven ashore near "Baltic Port". She was on a voyage from Wyborg to Bordeaux, Gironde, France. She had become a wreck by 25 November.
Ann and Maria	United Kingdom	The ship was driven ashore at Brancaster, Norfolk. She was on a voyage from Danzig to King's Lynn, Norfolk.
Backbarrow	United Kingdom	The ship sprang a leak and was beached at Fleetwood, Lancashire.
Belt	(United Kingdom of Great Britain and Ireland) British North America	The ship was driven ashore at "Jones's Harbour", United States. She was on a voyage from Boston, Massachusetts, to Annapolis Royal, Nova Scotia.
Cognac	France	The ship was wrecked at Santa Margalida, Mallorca, Spain. She was on a voyage from Sierra Leone to Marseille, Bouches-du-Rhône.
Elizabeth Conway	United Kingdom	The ship was driven ashore at Milford Haven, Pembrokeshire. She was refloated.
Exile	United Kingdom	The brig was driven ashore and wrecked at Nahant, Massachusetts, United States. Her crew were rescued. She was on a voyage from Nova Scotia, British North America to Salem, Massachusetts.
Frances	United Kingdom	The schooner was driven ashore and wrecked on Georges Island, Massachusetts, United States. Her crew were rescued.
Heroine	France	The schooner ran aground on the Herd Sand, in the North Sea off the coast of County Durham, United Kingdom. She was refloated.
Ida	Flag unknown	The ship was driven ashore near "Punta Mala", Spain. She was on a voyage from Genoa to Lisbon, Portugal. She was refloated.
Industry	United Kingdom	The barque was beached and sank at Fowey, Cornwall.
John	United Kingdom	The ship ran aground on the North Gar Sand, in the North Sea off the coast of County Duram.
John	Danzig	The ship was driven ashore north of Rønne, Denmark. She was on a voyage from Gloucester, United Kingdom to Danzig.
Murre	United Kingdom	The smack was wrecked on the Stack Rock, on the coast of Pembrokeshire. She was on a voyage from Bridgwater, Somerset to Milford Haven, Pembrokeshire. She was refloated on 29 November and towed into Milford Haven.
Neptunus	Russia	The ship ran aground in the Swine Bottoms, off the coast of Denmark. She was on a voyage from Riga to Ostend, West Flanders, Belgium. She was refloated on 25 November and towed into Helsingør, Denmark.
Numa	France	The barque was severely damaged by an onboard explosion at Cardiff, Glamorgan, United Kingdom. She was on a voyage from Cardiff to the Rio Grande.
Tom Bowling	United Kingdom	The brig was driven ashore at Padstow, Cornwall.

== 22 November ==
List of shipwrecks: 22 November 1851
Ship	State	Description
Anne and Isabella	United Kingdom	The ship was abandoned in the North Sea. Her crew were rescued. She was on a voyage from South Shields, County Durham to Lowestoft, Suffolk She was subsequently taken into Great Yarmouth, Norfolk in a derelict condition.
Arab	United Kingdom	The brig was wrecked on Ambergris Caye, British Honduras.
Arbutus	(United Kingdom of Great Britain and Ireland) British North America	The ship was wrecked at "L'Anse a Beaufils". She was on a voyage from Halifax, Nova Scotia to Quebec City, Province of Canada.
Catherine and Margaret	United Kingdom	The ship collided with the steamship Roscommon (United Kingdom) and sank in the River Thames. Her crew were rescued.
Dahlia	United Kingdom	The ship was driven ashore on the coast of Pas-de-Calais, France. She was on a voyage from Dunkirk, Nord to Sunderland, County Durham. She was refloated and taken into Calais.
Dove	United Kingdom	The ship ran aground at Cardiff, Glamorgan. She was on a voyage from Newport, Monmouthshire to Southampton, Hampshire. She was refloated but had to be beached at Penarth, Glamorgan.
Frances	United Kingdom	The schooner was driven ashore and wrecked on Georges Island, Massachusetts, United States. Her crew were rescued.
Hebe	United Kingdom	The ship was driven ashore and wrecked at Naples, Kingdom of the Two Sicilies with the loss of two of her crew.
Henry	United Kingdom	The brig foundered off the Cockle Sand, in the North Sea off the coast of Norfolk. Her crew were rescued.
Industry	United Kingdom	The barque sprang a leak and sank at Falmouth, Cornwall.
John and Amelia	United Kingdom	The ship ran aground on the Mouse Sand, in the Thames Estuary. She was on a voyage from London to South Shields, County Durham. She was refloated.
John and Eliza	United Kingdom	The sloop was driven ashore at Rhyl, Denbighshire. She was on a voyage from Saltney, Cheshire to Holyhead, Anglesey. She was refloated and taken into Rhyl for repairs.
Marie Louise	(United Kingdom of Great Britain and Ireland) British North America	The schooner sank at Quebec City.
Speedwell	United Kingdom	The ship was damaged by fire at Bridlington, Yorkshire.
Surat	India	The steamship foundered off the coast of Scinde.

== 23 November ==
List of shipwrecks: 23 November 1851
Ship	State	Description
Albatross	United Kingdom	The brig was driven ashore and damaged at Flamborough Head, Yorkshire. She was refloated.
Columbus	Bremen	The ship was in collision with the barque Amboyna (Netherlands). She consequently put into Dover, Kent, United Kingdom, where she ran aground and was further damaged. She was on a voyage from Bremen to Havana, Cuba.
Governor	United Kingdom	The ship ran aground in the Irish Sea off the coast of County Antrim. She was on a voyage from Limerick to Glasgow, Renfrewshire. She was refloated and towed into Belfast, County Anrim, where she arrived on 25 November.
Pleiades	Belgium	The ship sank at Antwerp.
Vestale	France	The brig ran aground in Gibraltar Bay. She was on a voyage from Marseille, Bouches-du-Rhône to Dendermonde, East Flanders, Belgium. She was refloated.

== 24 November ==
List of shipwrecks: 24 November 1851
Ship	State	Description
Altona	United Kingdom	The barque was driven ashore at Pakefield, Suffolk and was abandoned. She was on a voyage from Quebec City, Province of Canada, British North America to Hull, Yorkshire. She was refloated the next day and towed into Lowestoft, Suffolk.
Barrowgate	United Kingdom	The brig was driven ashore at Breaksea Point, Glamorgan. She was on a voyage from London to Newport, Monmouthshire. She was refloated.
Charles	United Kingdom	The ship ran aground off the coast of Dorset. She was on a voyage from Sunderland, County Durham, to Lyme Regis, Dorset. She was refloated and taken into Lyme Regis.
Chimbo	Belgium	The ship ran aground in the Scheldt near Doel, East Flanders. She was on a voyage from Havana Cuba to Antwerp. She was refloated the next day and taken into Antwerp/
Commerce	United Kingdom	The ship was beached at Grimsby, Lincolnshire. She was on a voyage from Leith, Lothian to London.
Gilderstone	United Kingdom	The ship was driven ashore near Saltfleet, Lincolnshire. She was on a voyage from Goole, Yorkshire to Great Yarmouth, Norfolk.
Liberty	United Kingdom	The ship was driven ashore at Vlissingen, Zeeland, Netherlands. She was on a voyage from Antwerp to Africa. she was refloated.
Lion	United Kingdom	The steamship was driven ashore near Blankenese. She was on a voyage from Hamburg to Hull, Yorkshire.
Susan	United Kingdom	The ship ran aground and was wrecked on the Goodwin Sands, Kent. Her crew were rescued. She was on a voyage from Kilrush, County Clare to London.
Syrian	United Kingdom	The ship was wrecked on the Elizabeth Reef. Some of her passengers and crew were landed, HMS Acheron (Royal Navy) was despatched to rescue the 33 people that remained on board. Syrian was on a voyage from Auckland, New Zealand to Sydney, New South Wales.
Trouadour	Bremen	The ship ran aground in the Elbe. She was on a voyage from Porto, Portugal to Bremen.
Virginia	United States	The ship was driven ashore at Cape Romain, South Carolina. Her crew were rescued. She was on a voyage from Liverpool, Lancashire, United Kingdom to Charleston, South Carolina. She was refloated on 29 November.
Weatherly	United Kingdom	The ship ran aground on the Haisborough Sands, in the North Sea off the coast of Norfolk and was abandoned by her crew. She subsequently sank. Weatherly was on a voyage from South Shields, County Durham to London.

== 25 November ==
List of shipwrecks: 25 November 1851
Ship	State	Description
Gilmore	United Kingdom	The ship was abandoned in the Atlantic Ocean with the loss of seven of her twenty crew. She was on a voyage from Quebec City, Province of Canada, British North America to Bristol, Gloucestershire. She was discovered in May 1852 by HMS Dragon (Royal Navy) and was towed into Lisbon, Portugal.
Niord	Sweden	The ship ran aground and was wrecked whilst on a voyage from Stockholm to Cambodia.
Ocean Bride	United Kingdom	The ship struck a sunken rock in Brandhuy Bay. She was on a voyage from Kronstadt, Russia to Liverpool, Lancashire. She consequently put into Stornoway, Isle of Lewis.
Rapid	United Kingdom	The ship was driven ashore at Dragør, Denmark. She was on a voyage from Königsberg, Kingdom of Prussia to Dundee, Forfarshire. She was refloated and resumed her voyage.
Victoria	United Kingdom	The pilot sloop struck The Manacles and sank. Her crew were rescued.

== 26 November ==
List of shipwrecks: 26 November 1851
Ship	State	Description
Brownsea Castle	United Kingdom	The smack was discovered abandoned in the English Channel. She was taken into Dover, Kent.
Isabel	United Kingdom	The brig was abandoned in the Atlantic Ocean. Her crew were rescued by Dykes (United Kingdom). Isabel was on a voyage from Richibucto, New Brunswick, British North America to Liverpool, Lancashire.
Jane Catherine	United Kingdom	The ship ran aground on the Shipwash Sand, in the North Sea off the coast of Suffolk. She was on a voyage from Hamburg to London. She was refloated and taken into Harwich, Essex.
USRC Lawrence	Revenue-Marine	The schooner was wrecked at San Francisco, California. Her crew survived.
Lord Clarendon	(United Kingdom of Great Britain and Ireland) British North America	The ship ran aground and was wrecked at Sydney, Nova Scotia, where she. Her crew were rescued. Lord Clarendon was on a voyage from North Sydney, Nova Scotia, to Liverpool.
Magog	United Kingdom	The ship was driven ashore at the mouth of the River Vartry.
Saturnus	(Russian Empire) Grand Duchy of Finland	The brig ran aground off Öland, Sweden. Her crew were rescued. She was on a voyage from Kaskinen to Newcastle upon Tyne, Northumberland, United Kingdom.
Virginia	United States	The ship was abandoned in the Atlantic Ocean. All on board were rescued by Marion (United States). Virginia was on a voyage from Livorno, Grand Duchy of Tuscany to New York.

== 27 November ==
List of shipwrecks: 27 November 1851
Ship	State	Description
Charlotte	United Kingdom	The smack was driven ashore at Padstow, Cornwall. She was on a voyage from Newquay, Cornwall to Bristol, Gloucestershire. She was refloated.
Giorgio	Greece	The ship was wrecked on the Goodwin Sands, Kent, United Kingdom. She was on a voyage from Great Yarmouth, Norfolk, United Kingdom to Syros. She was refloated the next day and towed into Ramsgate, Kent.
Ocean Queen	United States	The fishing schooner was lost on the Georges Bank. lost with all 8 hands.
Queen of the Isles	(United Kingdom of Great Britain and Ireland) British North America	The brig was driven ashore at Cape Pine, Newfoundland. She was on a voyage from Saint John's, Newfoundland to Sydney, Nova Scotia.
William Thompson	United Kingdom	The ship was driven ashore at Galway. She was on a voyage from Trieste to Galway.

== 28 November ==
List of shipwrecks: 28 November 1851
Ship	State	Description
Bertha	Sweden	The ship was driven ashore on the Tendra Spit, Russia.
Germania	Hamburg	The ship ran aground on the Goodwin Sands, Kent, United Kingdom. She was on a voyage from Hamburg to La Guaira, Venezuela. She was refloated the next day and taken into Ramsgate, Kent.
Haabet's Anker	Duchy of Holstein	The ship was abandoned in the North Sea. Her crew were rescued by Medea (Denmark).
Martha Ellen	United Kingdom	The ship was driven ashore in the Gulf of Smyrna. She was on a voyage from Troon, Ayrshire to Smyrna, Russia. She was refloated on 30 November and taken into Smyrna.
Rigby	United Kingdom	The schooner ran aground in the River Dee. She was still aground on 7 December when Mars (United Kingdom) collided with her whilst under tow.
Robert Watt	United Kingdom	The ship ran aground in the River Avon. She was on a voyage from Miramichi, New Brunswick, British North America to Bristol, Gloucestershire.
Two Friends	(United Kingdom of Great Britain and Ireland) New South Wales	The ship was lost off the South Reef. She was on a voyage from Fort Macquarie to Hobart, Van Diemen's Land.
Warrior	United Kingdom	The ship ran aground in the River Avon. She was on a voyage from Africa to Bristol. She was refloated and taken into the Kingroad.

== 29 November ==
List of shipwrecks: 29 November 1851
Ship	State	Description
Despatch	United Kingdom	The brig ran aground on the Barnard Sand, in the North Sea off the coast of Suffolk. She was on a voyage from Newcastle upon Tyne, Northumberland to London. She was refloated with assistance from the paddle tug Pursuit (United Kingdom) and towed into Lowestoft, Suffolk in a leaky condition.
Kron Prindsen	Sweden	The ship ran aground and was wrecked near "Tramm", Denmark. Her crew were rescued. She was on a voyage from Hamburg to Norrköping.
Lady Peel	United Kingdom	The brig ran aground on Scroby Sands, Norfolk. She was on a voyage from Sunderland, County Durham, to London. She was refloated but consequently sank. Her crew were rescued.
Liscard	United Kingdom	The ship sprang a leak and was abandoned in the Atlantic Ocean. Her crew were rescued. She was on a voyage from Quebec City, Province of Canada, British North America to Liverpool, Lancashire.
London	United Kingdom	The ship ran aground at St. Ives, Cornwall. She was on a voyage from Quebec City, Province of Canada, British North America to Hayle, Cornwall.
Monadnoc	United States	The ship was driven ashore and wrecked near Musquash, New Brunswick, British North America. Her crew were rescued. She was on a voyage from Saint John, New Brunswick to Boston, Massachusetts.

== 30 November ==
List of shipwrecks: 30 November 1851
Ship	State	Description
Adolphus	United Kingdom	The ship ran aground on the Gunfleet Sand, in the North Sea off the coast of Essex. She was on a voyage from Sunderland, County Durham, to London. She was refloated but consequently sank. Her crew were rescued.
Alpha	(United Kingdom of Great Britain and Ireland) British North America	The ship capsized off Cape Sable Island, Nova Scotia with the loss of four of her crew. Survivors were rescued by Governor (United States). Alpha was on a voyage from Saint John, New Brunswick to Boston, Massachusetts, United States.
Anna	United Kingdom	The ship was driven ashore on Tenedos, Ottoman Empire. She was on a voyage from Newcastle upon Tyne, Northumberland to Constantinople, Ottoman Empire. She had become a wreck by 10 December.
Anna Maria	Hamburg	The ship was driven ashore in the Scheldt. She was on a voyage from Antwerp, Belgium to Hamburg.
Aurora	Hamburg	The ship was driven ashore in the Scheldt. She was on a voyage from Antwerp to Hamburg.
Robert Watt	United Kingdom	The ship ran aground in the River Avon. She was on a voyage from Miramichi, New Brunswick, British North America to Bristol, Gloucestershire.

== Unknown date ==
List of shipwrecks: Unknown date 1851
Ship	State	Description
Æolus	Lübeck	The ship was wrecked on Ruhnu, Russia before 29 October with the loss of a crew member. She was on a voyage from Riga, Russia to Lübeck.
Anastasia	Russia	The ship was lost before 8 November whilst on a voyage from Kronstadt to Riga.
Austerlitz	United States	The ship was abandoned in the Pacific Ocean. Her crew were rescued by Palmer (United Kingdom). Austerlitz was on a voyage from San Francisco, California to Calcutta, India.
Bougina	France	The ship was driven ashore and wrecked on Læsø, Denmark before 13 November. She was on a voyage from Danzig to Paimbœuf, Loire-Inférieure.
Cassandra	United Kingdom	The barque was destroyed by fire in late November. All on board survived. She was on a voyage from Port Glasgow, Renfrewshire to Valparaíso, Chile and San Francisco.
Centurion	United Kingdom	The brig was wrecked at Turku, Grand Duchy of Finland before 11 November with the loss of all hands. She was on a voyage from Saint Petersburg, Russia to London.
Cooper	United States	The brigantine was wrecked near Cape Race, Newfoundland, British North America in late November with the loss of all hands.
Edmondstone	United Kingdom	The barque was abandoned in the Atlantic Ocean before 20 November. She was towed into Westport, Nova Scotia, British North America but was driven ashore and wrecked on Long Island, Nova Scotia.
Eliza	United Kingdom	The ship was driven ashore and wrecked on "Wranglesholm", Russia before 4 November. She was on a voyage from Kronstadt to Dundee, Forfarshire.
Eveline	Denmark	The ship was wrecked on Møn before 12 November. Her crew were rescued. She was on a voyage from Visby, Sweden to Karrebæksminde.
Five Sisters	United Kingdom	The barque was abandoned in the Atlantic Ocean before 5 November. Her crew were rescued by Deborah (United Kingdom). Five Sisters was on a voyage from Quebec City, Province of Canada, British North America to Bristol.
Fortuna	Denmark	The ship was destroyed by fire at Varberg, Sweden before 12 November. She was on a voyage from Copenhagen to Saint Petersburg, Russia.
Georgette	France	The brig was driven ashore and wrecked on Faial Island, Azores between 12 and 16 November.
Great Western	United Kingdom	The paddle steamer ran aground and was damaged at Liverpool. She was on a voyage from New York, United States to Liverpool. She was refloated on 23 November.
Guttenburg	Lübeck	The ship was driven ashore and wrecked at Reval, Russia before 8 November with the loss of at least four lives.
Hanna	Norway	The barque was wrecked in the Isles of Scilly, United Kingdom before 17 November. She was on a voyage from Galaţi, Ottoman Empire to Queenstown, County Cork, United Kingdom.
Hebe	United Kingdom	The ship was lost in the Dogger Bank. She was on a voyage from Newport, Monmouthshire to Stettin.
Hedelma	Russian Empire	The ship sank near Helsinki before 8 November. Her crew were rescued.
Hero	United Kingdom	The ship sank at Dover, Kent. She was refloated on 26 November.
Jacob	Russia	The ship ran aground before 8 November whilst on a voyage from Kronstadt to Christianstad, Sweden.
Jane Shields	United Kingdom	The barque was wrecked south of Talcahuano, Chile.
Johanna Gesina	Flag unknown	The ship was driven ashore. She was on a voyage from Riga, Russia to Berwick upon Tweed, Northumberland, United Kingdom. She was refloated and taken into Cuxhaven, where she arrived on 22 November in a severely leaky condition.
Kitty	United Kingdom	The schooner was driven ashore and sank at Trevose Head, Cornwall before 24 November with the loss of at least two lives.
Latona	United Kingdom	The barque was abandoned in the North Sea. She was on a voyage from Quebec City to Hull, Yorkshire. She was taken into Lowestoft, Suffolk in a waterlogged condition on 25 November.
Leander	United Kingdom	The ship was abandoned in the Atlantic Ocean before 29 November. She was on a voyage from Saint John, New Brunswick, British North America to London.
Lord Wellington	United Kingdom	The ship foundered 10 nautical miles (19 km) off San Lorenzo Island, Peru before 8 November. She was on a voyage from the Chincha Islands to Lima, Perua.
Mary	(United Kingdom of Great Britain and Ireland) British North America	The brigantine was wrecked in Chance Cove with the loss of all hands. She was on a voyage from New York to Saint John's, Newfoundland.
Meta	Prussia	The sloop was wrecked at "Junida", Russia. She was on a voyage from Kronstadt to Kiel.
Monarch	United Kingdom	The ship foundered. Her crew were rescued by Ottawa ( (United Kingdom of Great Britain and Ireland) British North America). She was on a voyage from Callao, Peru to Queenstown, County Cork and/or London.
Ocean Queen	United Kingdom	The ship was wrecked in the Moray Firth.
Opalia	(United Kingdom of Great Britain and Ireland) New Zealand	The schooner was lost in the Fiji Islands. Her crew were rescued.
Philemon	Russia	The ship was wrecked at "Junida". She was on a voyage from Kronstadt to Helsinki, Grand Duchy of Finland.
Preciosa	Sweden	The ship was wrecked before 4 November. She was on a voyage from Saint Petersburg to Gamla Carleby.
Roding	United Kingdom	The ship was driven ashore and severely damaged at Salina before 7 November. She was refloated on 10 November.
Salus	United Kingdom	The ship was driven ashore near Saint Petersburg, Sweden. She was on a voyage from Saint Petersburg to an English port. She was refloated on 1 December and taken into Saint Petersburg, subsequently resuming her voyage.
Scotia	United Kingdom	The ship was wrecked on a reef 60 to 70 nautical miles (110 to 130 km) north of Labuan, Malaya before 20 November. She was abandoned on 19 December. She was on a voyage from Bombay, India to China.
Sir Richard Jackson	United Kingdom	The barque was driven ashore at "Kamarouska", British North America.
Thetis	United Kingdom	The ship was lost before 8 November. She was on a voyage from Kronstadt to Bombay.
Towo	Russia	The ship ran aground between Hogland and the Aspö Islands, Grand Duchy of Finland before 8 November. She was on a voyage from Kronstadt to Turku.
Trewartha	United Kingdom	The ship ran aground off Texel, North Holland, Netherlands and was severely damaged. She was on a voyage from Hamburg to Fowey, Cornwall. She was refloated and completed her voyage, arriving at Fowey on 13 November.
William and Rose	United Kingdom	The ship was lost between Hogland and the Titters, Russia before 8 November.
