= Lucy Atkinson =

Traveller and writer (1817–1893)

Lucy Sherrard Atkinson
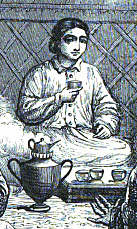
- Born: Lucy Sherrard Finley; 15 April 1817; Sunderland, Co. Durham
- Died: 13 November 1893 (aged 76); London
- Occupation: Explorer
- Known for: Travels in Siberia and Central Asia
- Notable work: Recollections of Tartar Steppes and their Inhabitants
- Spouse: Thomas Witlam Atkinson

Lucy Sherrard Atkinson (née Finley; 15 April 1817 – 13 November 1893) was an English explorer and author who travelled throughout Central Asia and Siberia during the mid-19th century. She worked as a governess in St. Petersburg, Russia and married English artist Thomas Witlam Atkinson in Moscow in 1848. The couple spent the next five years traveling thousands of miles together to remote areas on the fringes of the Russian and Chinese empires. During their travels a son was born to her in present-day Kazakhstan.

In 1863, Atkinson published a book Recollections of Tartar Steppes and their Inhabitants about her travels.

== Career ==
Born Lucy Sherrard Finley on 15 April 1817 in Sunderland, Co. Durham, she was the third child and eldest daughter among the ten children of Matthew Smith Finley (1778-1847), an East London schoolmaster and his wife, Mary Anne, daughter of William York, perfumer.

"Being one of a large family," Lucy Atkinson says, "it became my duty, at an early period of life, to seek support by my own exertions." In about 1838, she went to Russia, where for eight years she lived in St Petersburg as governess to the daughter of General Mikhail Nikolaevich Muravyev-Vilensky. In 1846, she met architect and painter Thomas Witlam Atkinson, newly arrived in Russia, and the two became romantically involved. Lucy was almost certainly unaware that Atkinson had a wife in England. He told her he was a widower. Atkinson soon departed St. Petersburg to visit the Ural Mountains and Altai Mountains in Siberia and Central Asia. On his return, the two were married in Moscow on 18 February 1848. They departed two days later to return to Siberia.

== Exploring ==
The Atkinson's spent five years on travels through Siberia, south to the Kazakh steppes and eastwards as far as Lake Baikal, Mongolia, and the Chinese border. Lucy seems to have adapted quickly from the gentile life of a governess to a long-distance traveler by sleigh, carriage, horseback, and boat. Lucy was armed with a rifle, a shotgun, and two pistols that she carried in her saddlebags. She apparently was a good shot. On one occasion, Lucy, now pregnant, spent 22 hours straight in the saddle crossing a waterless desert with the danger of being accosted by Kazakh nomads.

On 4 November 1848, at the small, frontier Russian military outpost of Qapal in what is now eastern Kazakhstan, Lucy gave birth to a son whom she and Thomas named Alatau Tamchiboulac Atkinson. His first name, Alatau, came from the nearby Alatau Mountains and his second name Tamchiboulac (a 'dropping spring') came from the Tamshybulak Spring in Qapal famous for its healing properties. She described her living conditions in Qapal. "We have one chair, the only one in Kopal [Qapal], one stool; but we are rich in tables, as we have two; our bedstead is composed of a few planks placed on two blocks of wood, with voilock [a felt blanket], and then furs instead of a mattress. Think not we are worse off than others. No! our house is as well, if not better, furnished than the governor's, as he has nothing but the voilock to sleep on." Lucy was thankful that she didn't have to give birth in a yurt.

Lucy rested in Qapal with her newborn until May 1849. The family had been fortunate to survive as a typus epidemic killed 107 people in the community and Lucy "was nothing but skin and bones; scarcely a pound of flesh" left on her. The Atkinson's spent the next four years exploring Central Asia, ofen visiting places never before seen by Europeans. In 1853, they returned to St. Petersburg. They stayed there until 1858 as Thomas worked on his paintings and wrote his first book about his travels. He did not mention Lucy or his son in this books, possibly to conceal that he had married a second time while his first wife was still alive and living in London. His letters and diary, however, reveal a warm and loving relationship with Lucy.

== Back in England ==
Thomas was a celebrity in England, feted by the Royal Geographical Society and other organization. His two books on his travels were greeted with favor. He died on 13 August 1861, leaving Lucy and son. Lucy was apparently unaware that Thomas had a previous wife and children until after his death. Thomas's son, James Wheeler, sued to claim his estate for his first wife. Lucy was left penniless. Her plight was mitigated in 1863, two years after Thomas' death, when she published Recollections of Tartar Steppes and Their Inhabitants and that year was granted a civil-list pension of £100. She received a further Civil List pension of £50 in 1870. Geographic Society leader Roderick Murchison led a campaign to raise funds to send her son, Alatau, to Rugby School.

Despite the legal problems with her husband's first wife, Lucy defiantly called herself "Mrs. Atkinson" with the publication of her book. The book is arranged as letters to a friend. It reveals Lucy as "an indefatigable traveler who was held in respect by local people, both for her equestrian skills and as a markswoman with pistol and rifle." Author Fielding says that the Atkinsons' travels "were no jolly jaunt" but a journey into largely unknown territory at the fringes of the Russian empire. A unique feature of her book is her descriptions of the lives in exile of Decembrists, formerly prominent Russians condemned to live in Siberia for plotting against the Czar in 1825. During her years of residence in St. Petersburg as a governess, she had become acquainted with relatives of several of the exiles.

At some point after the publication of her book, Lucy returned to Russia. She eventually came back to London, where she lived in Camden Road, Holloway.

In 1881, Lucy was living in London in the home of Benjamin C. Robinson, Sergeant at Law, aged 68. Lucy is listed as a cousin to Benjamin, although in fact she was not closely related. She died of acute bronchitis at 45 Mecklenburgh Square, London, on 13 November 1893, and is buried at Tower Hamlets Cemetery Park.

== Legacy ==
Journalist Nick Fielding later wrote the book South to the Great Steppe: The Travels of Thomas and Lucy Atkinson in Eastern Kazakhstan, 1847–1852, which described the expedition of the Atkinson family to the Steppe.
