= Medawar Medal =

British Transplant Society award

Medawar medal

The British Transplant Society (BTS) awards the Medawar Medal each year for the best clinical and scientific research presentations by a scientist or doctor. The Medawar medal is the most prestigious award that the society can offer, is highly competitive, and cannot be won more than once by a single individual. The award is named after Peter Medawar, a Nobel Prize winner in Medicine or Physiology. Two medals are awarded every year.

== See also ==
- List of medicine awards
