= Qapal (river) =

Location
- Country: Kazakhstan

Physical characteristics
- Mouth: Qyzylaghash
  - coordinates: 45.279°N 78.835°E

The Qapal (Kazakh: Қапал, Qapal) is a river of Almaty Province, south-eastern Kazakhstan. It is a tributary of the Qyzylaghash, which ends in the plains south of Lake Balkhash. The main settlement on the river is the village Qapal.
