= Lorna Marson =

Lorna Marson is a Professor of Transplant Surgery and Dean of Clinical Medicine at the University of Edinburgh Medical School, and an Honorary Consultant Transplant Surgeon at the Royal Infirmary of Edinburgh with a focus on renal transplantation. In 2017, she was the first woman to be elected President of the British Transplantation Society.

== Education ==
Professor Marson started her medical career as an undergraduate student at St Thomas' Hospital in London, where her interest in surgery began. She qualified in 1990 and went on to complete her early postgraduate training on a Basic Surgical Training Rotation at St Bartholomew's Hospital and Higher Surgical Training on the South East Scotland Training Rotation.

== Career ==
In 2003, Marson was awarded a Clinical Scientist Award from the Academy of Medical Sciences, which allowed her to take up the post of clinical academic at The University of Edinburgh. Initially describing herself as a "reluctant researcher", Marson has gone on to develop, and enjoy producing, a clinical research portfolio focused on renal transplantation.

In 2017, Marson was the first woman to be elected President of the British Transplantation Society. She held the position until 2019. Marson was the Director of UK Organ Donation and Transplantation Research Network from 2018 to 2024. She was the Associate Medical Director for Research and Development at NHSBT Organ and Tissue Donation and Transplantation from 2021 to 2024. Marson became a Fellow of the Royal Society of Edinburgh in 2024.

Currently, Marson is a Professor of Transplant Surgery and Dean of Clinical Medicine at the University of Edinburgh Medical School, and an Honorary Consultant Transplant Surgeon at the Royal Infirmary of Edinburgh.

Beyond her academic and clinical roles, Marson is also currently the lead for Diversity and Respect for Edinburgh Medical School, with aims to broaden the socio-economic, ethnic and gender diversity of the student population.
