= All-Steel =

Defunct American motor vehicle manufacturer

All-Steel Motor Car Co.
- Trade name: Macon Automobile
- Industry: Automobile
- Founded: 1915
- Defunct: 1917
- Fate: Bankruptcy
- Headquarters: Macon, Missouri, United States
- Products: Automobile Manufacturing

The All-Steel Motor Car Co. of Macon, Missouri, United States, was formed in St. Louis in 1915 to manufacture an automobile called the All-Steel or Alstel. All-Steel moved to Macon for production in a new factory. The automobile that was to be built was called the Macon.

== History ==
The All-Steel or Macon, designed by Charles L. Smith, had a conventional 4-cylinder engine made by Sterling. It had a unique narrow platform backbone frame that enclosed the propeller shaft and gearbox. The body, electrically welded, was attached to the frame and rear axle at only three points so that the body could be easily removed. It was planned to be offered at $350 to $400.

The company was reorganized as the Macon Motor Car Company in January 1917. In May 1917 the factory burned to the ground before production could start. Only prototypes had been built before the company declared bankruptcy.
