= Fred Marson =

English footballer (1900–1976)

Personal information
- Full name: Fred Marson
- Date of birth: 8 January 1900
- Place of birth: Darlaston, England
- Date of death: 1976 (aged 75–76)
- Position: Winger

Senior career*
Years	Team	Apps	(Gls)
1922–1923	Darlaston		
1923–1925	Wolverhampton Wanderers	8	(4)
1926–1928	Sheffield Wednesday	10	(0)
1928–1929	Swansea Town	14	(4)
1929–1930	Darlaston		
1930–1931	Wellington Town		
1931–1932	Shrewsbury Town		
1932–1933	Darlaston		
Total		32	(8)
- * Club domestic league appearances and goals

Fred Marson (8 January 1900 – 1976) was an English footballer who played in the Football League for Sheffield Wednesday, Swansea Town and Wolverhampton Wanderers.
