= Macon, Belgium =

Coordinates: 50°03′N 4°13′E

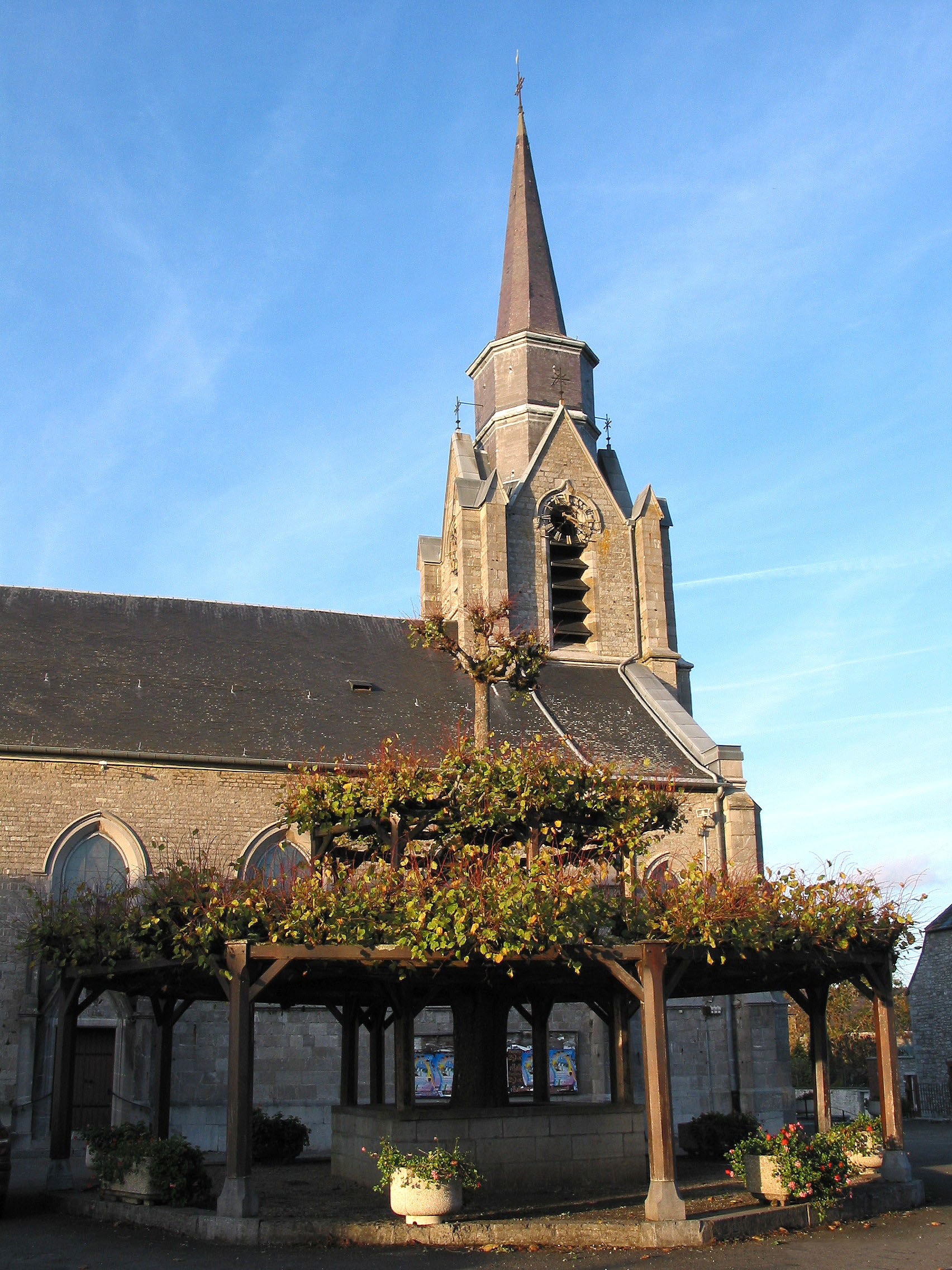
Macon

Macon (French pronunciation: [makɔ̃]) is a village of Wallonia and a district of the municipality of Momignies, located in the province of Hainaut, Belgium.

The town has approximately 500 people, and is about 10 miles west of Chimay, near the French border. Nearby lies the site where the first U.S. troops began to liberate Belgium during World War II. A memorial stands near Macon at the point where soldiers of the First Army crossed from France into Belgium. The town is centered on St. Jean the Baptist Church, and a Linden Tree, several centuries old, sits in the church square, and is supported by braces originally built in the 17th century by Monsieur DeCuir.
