= Levi Marston =

American sea captain

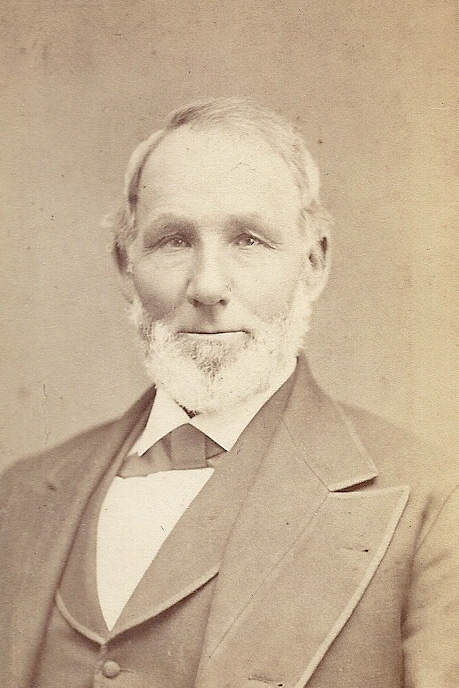
- Marston pictured around 1880
- Born: June 3, 1816; North Yarmouth, Massachusetts, U.S.
- Died: August 3, 1904 (aged 88); Yarmouth, Maine, U.S.
- Resting place: Pine Grove Cemetery, North Yarmouth, Maine, U.S.
- Occupation: Sea captain

Levi Marston (June 3, 1816 – August 3, 1904) was an American sea captain from Maine. In 1852, he was awarded a gold medal for heroism by Queen Victoria after he saved over three hundred immigrants from a British shipwreck.

== Life and career ==
Marston was born in North Yarmouth, Massachusetts (now in Maine), to Thomas Marston and Eunice Roberts.

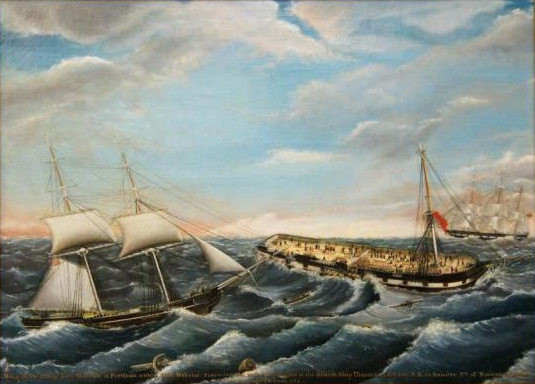
Joseph B. Smith's 1851 oil painting of the Harriet and Unicorn

He first went to sea at the age of fourteen, and went on to command his own brig, Harriet. He sailed around Cape Horn thirty-two times during trading in China, the West Indies and on the coasts of the Atlantic and Pacific Oceans.

On November 9, 1851, he saved the lives of over three hundred immigrants from the British ship Unicorn which had been wrecked during a storm near Grand Banks of Newfoundland. The following year, he was awarded a gold medal for heroism by Queen Victoria.

Sir, it is with much satisfaction I have the honor of transmitting to you, herewith, three Gold Medals, bearing on the obverse the portrait of Her Majesty the Queen, which Her Majesty's Government desire to present to Captain W. H. Howard, of the United States packet Ship "Daniel Webster;" to Captain Levi Marston, of the United States brig "Harriet;" and to Captain Bowne, of the United States ship "Star of the West;" for having, in November last, saved the passengers and crew of the British emigrant ship "Unicorn," from the wreck of that vessel.
I have to request, sir, that you will be so good as to cause these medals to be forwarded to the persons for whom they are respectively destined. I avail myself of this opportunity to renew to you, sir, the assurance of my highest consideration.

— Sir John Crampton, 2nd Baronet, in a letter (dated June 5, 1852) to Daniel Webster, Sailor's Magazine (1852), p. 29

Joseph B. Smith was a passenger of the Unicorn. He made pencil sketches of the shipwreck, which he later memorialized in a 1851 oil painting.

He married twice: firstly to Lavinia Mitchell (who died in 1880), then, four years later, to her sister Mary Louise Mitchell. They were daughters of John Mitchell and Eliza Gooding. Levi was Mary's third husband.

Marston lived at Riverside Farm on North Road in today's Yarmouth. His daughter, Ellen, and her husband, James Lawrence, assumed ownership of the farm when he moved to Yarmouth.

He helped begin Yarmouth's Methodist church in the 1890s.

== Death ==
Marston died on August 3, 1904, aged 88. He is interred in North Yarmouth's Pine Grove Cemetery, in a plot with both of his wives.

== See also ==
- List of shipwrecks in November 1851
