= J. Richard Batchelor =

Richard Batchelor FRCPath, FRCP
- Born: John Richard Batchelor; 4 October 1931; Woking, Surrey, England
- Died: 21 December 2015 (aged 84)
- Education: Marlborough College; University of Cambridge
- Occupation: Immunologist
- Employer: Royal Postgraduate Medical School
- Known for: Transplant immunology

John Richard Batchelor (4 October 1931 – 21 December 2015), known as Richard, was a British immunologist, specialising in transplant immunology.

Batchelor was born in Woking, Surrey, on 4 October 1931 to Esme (née Cornwall) and Basil Batchelor, and was raised in Madras, India. He was educated at Marlborough College and obtained his medical qualifications from the University of Cambridge.

He was Professor of Immunology at the Royal Postgraduate Medical School, from 1979 to 1994; and afterwards Professor Emeritus.

He died on 21 December 2015.
