= Macon (given name) =

Macon is a masculine given name borne by:

- Macon Bolling Allen (1816–1894), believed to be the first African American to become a lawyer and to argue before a jury, and the second to hold a judicial position in the United States
- Macon Blair (born 1974), American film director, producer, screenwriter, comic book writer and actor
- Macon M. Long (1885–1988), American politician from Virginia
- Macon McCalman (1932–2005), American actor
- Macon Phillips (born 1978), American public servant

== See also ==
- L. Macon Epps (1920–2012), American engineer, inventor, author and poet
