= Marsone =

Marsone may refer to:

- Pierre Marsone (born 1966), French sinologist
- Mars One, one-way crewed mission to Mars project

== See also ==
- Mars 1 (disambiguation)
- Marson (disambiguation)
