= Qapal =

Qapal Қапал Qayaligh
- Village
- Location in Kazakhstan
- Coordinates: 45°08′N 79°03′E
- Country: Kazakhstan
- Region: Jetisu Region
- District: Aksu District

Population (2009)
  - Total: 3,869
- Time zone: UTC+6 (Omsk Time)

Qapal (Kazakh: Қапал), formerly known as Kopal (Russian: Копал), Qayaligh during the Mongol rule, is a village in Aksu District in Jetisu Region of south-eastern Kazakhstan. It is situated on the river Qapal. Until 1921, it was an uyezd center of the Semirechye Oblast.

== Tamshybulak Spring ==
The Tamshybulak Spring is a large spring on the territory of the village, situated on fertile ground. The water does not freeze in winter and algae grow all year round. The water flows down from the mountains in small drops, so it is called in Kazakh "Tears of the Earth" or "Weeping Spring".

The spring is renowned for the beauty and sacred power of its water, which is medicinal: each arm of the spring has its own properties. In one place, the water is believed to benefit eye diseases, in another, those of the stomach, and so on. Many pilgrims and tourists visit because of their belief in the healing properties of the water, which are yet to be confirmed by scientific studies.

The first records concerning the medicinal properties of the spring were studied and collected by the great traveller and geographer Shokan Valikhanov in 1859–1865. In 1848, the English travellers Thomas Witlam Atkinson and his wife Lucy visited Kapal. He published his first article describing the spring and the nature of Kapal village in 1869 in the St. Petersburg magazine "Around the World". The Atkinsons' son was born in Kapal and was named after the spring: Alatau Tamchiboulac Atkinson.
