= Macon Township =

Macon Township may refer to:

- Macon Township, Bureau County, Illinois
- Macon Township, Harvey County, Kansas
- Macon Township, Michigan
- Macon Township, Franklin County, Nebraska
