= Momignies =

Municipality in Hainaut Province, Wallonia, Belgium

Momignies Momgniye (Picard)
- Municipality
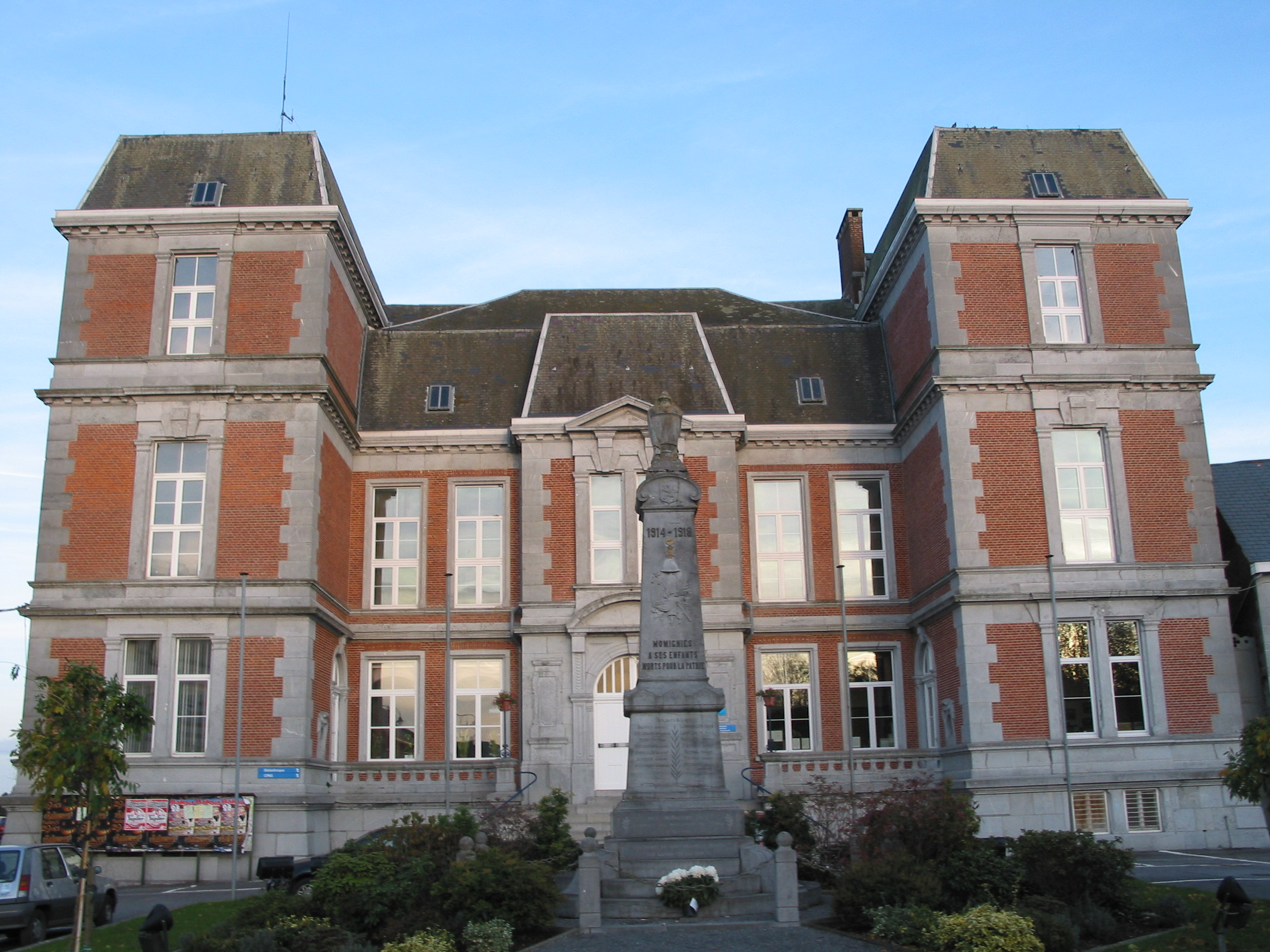

- Flag Coat of arms

- Location of Momignies in Hainaut
- Interactive map of Momignies
- Location in Belgium
- Coordinates: 50°02′N 04°10′E
- Country: Belgium
- Community: French Community
- Region: Wallonia
- Province: Hainaut
- Arrondissement: Thuin

Government
  - Mayor: Eddy Bayard (MR)
  - Governing party: MR – PS

Area
  - Total: 86.01 km^{2} (33.21 sq mi)

Population (2018-01-01)
  - Total: 5,309
  - Density: 61.73/km^{2} (159.9/sq mi)
- Postal codes: 6590-6594, 6596
- NIS code: 56051
- Area codes: 060
- Website: www.momignies.be

Momignies (French pronunciation: [mɔmiɲi]; Picard: Momgniye) is a municipality of Wallonia located in the province of Hainaut, Belgium.

On 1 January 2006 Momignies had a total population of 5,125. The total area is 85.58 km^{2}, which gives a population density of 60 inhabitants per km^{2}.

The municipality consists of the following districts: Beauwelz, Forge-Philippe, Macon, Macquenoise, Momignies, Monceau-Imbrechies, and Seloignes.

Momignies is notable for encompassing the only area in Belgium which is not drained into the North Sea. It is drained by the Oise river into the English Channel.
