= John Morris Marsden =

British solicitor and philatelist

- Born: 1857
- Died: 29 August 1939 (aged 81–82)
- Occupations: Solicitor; philatelist

John Morris Marsden (1857 – 29 August 1939) was a British solicitor and philatelist who was appointed to the Roll of Distinguished Philatelists in 1921.
