= John Buxton Marsden =

John Buxton Marsden (1803 – 16 June 1870) was an English cleric, known as a historical writer and editor.

== Life ==
Marsden was born at Liverpool. He was admitted sizar of St John's College, Cambridge, on 10 April 1823; and graduated B.A. in 1827, M.A. in 1830. He was ordained in 1827 to the curacy of Burslem, Staffordshire, and then moved to Harrow, Middlesex.

From 1833 to 1844 Marsden held the rectory of Lower Tooting, Surrey, during the minority of his successor, R. W. Greaves, and from 1844 to 1851 he was vicar of Great Missenden, Buckinghamshire. In 1851 he became perpetual curate of St. Peter, Dale End, Birmingham.

Marsden was a liberal evangelical. At a meeting of the clergy at Aylesbury on 7 December 1847 to protest against the appointment of Renn Dickson Hampden to the see of Hereford, he moved an amendment, and spoke of Hampden's treatment as unfair treatment. For five years before his death he was incapacitated him from engaging in active duty of any kind. He died on 16 June 1870 at 37 Highfield Road, Edgbaston, Birmingham.

== Works ==
Marsden was author of three major works:

- The History of the Early Puritans, from the Reformation to the Opening of the Civil War in 1642, London, 1850.
- The History of the Later Puritans, from the Opening of the Civil War to 1662, London, 1852.
- History of Christian Churches and Sects from the earliest ages of Christianity, 2 vols. London, 1856; new edit. 1858.

Marsden's other writings include:

- The Churchmanship of the New Testament: an Inquiry … into the Origin and Progress of certain Opinions which now agitate the Church of Christ, London, 1846.
- Memoirs of the Rev. Samuel Marsden of Paramatta, London (1858) (Samuel Marsden was no relation);
- Memoirs of the Rev. Hugh Stowell of Manchester, London, 1868.

He published sermons and lectures, contributed a biographical preface to a posthumous work of the Rev. Edward Dewdney, A Treatise on the special Providence of God, 1848, and edited, with preface and notes, Jules Simon's Natural Religion, 1857. From 1859 to 1869 Marsden was editor of the Christian Observer.
