= John Marston (cricketer) =

Argentine-born English cricketer

John Marston (25 October 1893 in Rosario – 9 July 1938 in Sherwood, Nottingham) was an Argentine-born English cricketer who played for Essex.

Marston made two first-class appearances, the first during a 1923 West Indian tour of England, against whom Marston played in the tailend and was bowled by George Francis for just four runs. Marston failed to take any wickets with the ball on his debut.

Marston made his second and final appearance in the 1924 County Championship, batting poorly and bowling uneconomically, after which he was dropped from the team.
