= Brad Marston =

American physicist

J. Brad Marston
- Education: California Institute of Technology (B.S.), Princeton University (Ph.D.)
- Known for: Cumulant expansions in geophysical flows, quantum-climate intersections, atmospheric teleconnections, generalized quasilinear approximation
- Awards: APS Fellow, NSF American Competitiveness and Innovation Fellow
- Scientific career
- Fields: Physics
- Workplaces: Brown University

J. Brad Marston is an American physicist and professor of physics at Brown University. He has applied cumulant expansion methods to atmospheric and oceanic dynamics, bridging quantum physics with climate science, and advancing statistical mechanics approaches to geophysical flows, including the study of atmospheric teleconnections. He is president-elect of the American Physical Society.

== Education and career ==
Marston attended California Institute of Technology, earning a B.S. in physics in 1984. He then attended Princeton University, where he was advised by Ian Affleck, and obtained a Ph.D. in physics (1989). After postdoctoral work at Cornell University with Barbara Cooper and Chris Henley, he took a position at Brown University where he is now a professor of physics. He has also held visiting positions at Massachusetts Institute of Technology, California Institute of Technology, ENS-Lyon, and the Kavli Institute for Theoretical Physics.

== Honors and awards ==
Marston is a fellow of the American Physical Society (2013).
