= D'Pharaoh Woon-A-Tai =

Canadian actor (born 2001)

- D'Pharaoh Woon-A-Tai at the 2026 New York Film Festival
- Born: September 19, 2001 (age 25); Toronto, Ontario, Canada
- Other name: D'Pharaoh McKay
- Occupations: Actor; model
- Years active: 2018–present
- Height: 1.8 m (5 ft 11 in)

D'Pharaoh Woon-A-Tai (born September 19, 2001) is a Canadian actor of Anisininew descent. He is best known for his role as Indigenous teenager Bear Smallhill in the FX on Hulu comedy-drama series Reservation Dogs (2021–2023), for which he received several accolades, including a nomination for a Primetime Emmy Award for Outstanding Lead Actor in a Comedy Series.

== Early life ==
Woon-A-Tai and his fraternal twin Mi'De Xxavier were born in Toronto. His name reflects his Anisininew and Chinese-Guyanese heritage. His paternal grandfather was Alex McKay, an Anishinaabemowin language professor at the University of Toronto's Indigenous Studies department. Woon-A-Tai and his family visited their paternal family in the Kitchenuhmaykoosib Inninuwug First Nation. His grandfather is Guyanese martial artist Frank Woon-A-Tai.

== Career ==
=== Film and television ===
Woon-A-Tai began his career with a recurring role as Chase Whaley in season 1 of the 2018 Family Channel series Holly Hobbie. In 2019, Woon-A-Tai played Tom Longboat in a two-episode arc of Murdoch Mysteries season 12. He made guest appearances as Lucky in Creeped Out and Mikey in Tribal.

Woon-A-Tai made his feature film debut as Hank in the film Beans directed by Tracey Deer, which was a 2020 Toronto International Film Festival selection and won Best Motion Picture at the Canadian Screen Awards.

In December 2020, it was announced Woon-A-Tai would star as Bear Smallhill in the 2021 FX on Hulu comedy-drama Reservation Dogs, "a slice-of-life triumph" from Sterlin Harjo and Taika Waititi. The Denver Gazette described Bear as "played spectacularly by D'Pharaoh, this series' breakout star." Reservation Dogs' second season premiered on August 3, 2022, and the third and final season premiered on August 2, 2023. His performance in the final season made him the first Indigenous actor to receive a Primetime Emmy Award nomination for Outstanding Lead Actor in a Comedy Series. He wore a red handprint at the 76th Primetime Emmy Awards as a symbol of solidarity with Missing and Murdered Indigenous Women.

In 2022, it was announced that Woon-A-Tai would be joining Finn Wolfhard and Billy Bryk in the duo's directorial debut Hell of a Summer, which was released in 2023. Woon-A-Tai plays Adam in the 2023 film Fitting In. He also stars in the indie thriller film Only the Good Survive, alongside Sidney Flanigan, Frederick Weller, and Will Ropp. The film was also released in 2023.

In March 2024, it was announced that Woon-A-Tai would be playing Ray Mendoza in Mendoza's upcoming film Warfare, alongside Noah Centineo, Charles Melton, Will Poulter, Joseph Quinn, and Kit Connor. The film is directed by both Mendoza and Alex Garland, who has directed notable films such as Civil War and Ex Machina.

In September 2024, it was announced that Woon-A-Tai would be joining Darren Aronofsky's Caught Stealing alongside Bad Bunny, Zoe Kravitz, Austin Butler, Regina King, and Matt Smith.

== Filmography ==
=== Film ===
Filmography: Film
| Year | Title | Role | Director(s) | Ref. |
|---|---|---|---|---|
| 2020 | Beans | Hank | Tracey Deer | |
| 2023 | Fitting In | Adam | Molly McGlynn | |
| 2023 | Only the Good Survive | Ry Coolidge | Dutch Southern | |
| 2023 | Hell of a Summer | Mike | Finn Wolfhard and Billy Bryk | |
| 2025 | Warfare | Ray Mendoza | Ray Mendoza and Alex Garland | |
| 2025 | Caught Stealing | Dale | Darren Aronofsky | |
| 2026 | A Long Winter | Jimmy | Andrew Haigh | |

=== Television ===
Filmography: Television
| Year | Title | Role | Notes | Ref. |
|---|---|---|---|---|
| 2018 | Holly Hobbie | Chase Whaley | 3 episodes | |
| 2019 | Murdoch Mysteries | Tom Longboat | 2 episodes | |
| 2019 | Creeped Out | Lucky | Episode: "The Takedown" | |
| 2020 | Tribal | Mikey | Episode: "Runs with a Gun" | |
| 2022 | TallBoyz | Himself | Episode: "Papa You Are My Dad" | |
| 2021–2023 | Reservation Dogs | Bear Smallhill | Main role | |

=== Web series ===
Filmography: Web series
| Year | Title | Role | Notes | Ref. |
|---|---|---|---|---|
| 2022 | Normal Ain't Normal | Wes | BuzzFeed web series Episode: "Unlord the Land" | |

== Awards and nominations ==
| Year | Award | Category | Work | Result | Ref. |
|---|---|---|---|---|---|
| 2022 | 37th Independent Spirit Awards | Best Ensemble Cast in a New Scripted Series (Shared with the cast) | Reservation Dogs | Won | |
| 2022 | Pena de Prata | Best Ensemble in a Comedy Series (Shared with the cast) | Reservation Dogs | Won | |
| 2023 | 28th Critics' Choice Television Awards | Best Actor in a Comedy Series | Reservation Dogs | Nominated | |
| 2024 | 29th Critics' Choice Television Awards | Best Actor in a Comedy Series | Reservation Dogs | Nominated | |
| 2024 | Primetime Emmy Awards | Outstanding Lead Actor in a Comedy Series | Reservation Dogs | Nominated | |
| 2024 | Rising Stars | Toronto Life Rising Stars 2024 | —N/a | Honored | |
| 2025 | Forbes | Forbes 30 Under 30 | —N/a | Honored | |
| 2025 | British Independent Film Awards | Best Ensemble Performance | Warfare | Won | |
