= Warfare (film) =

2025 film by Ray Mendoza and Alex Garland

- Theatrical release poster
- Directed by: Ray Mendoza; Alex Garland
- Written by: Ray Mendoza; Alex Garland
- Produced by: Andrew Macdonald; Allon Reich; Matthew Penry-Davey; Peter Rice
- Starring: D'Pharaoh Woon-A-Tai; Will Poulter; Cosmo Jarvis; Kit Connor; Finn Bennett; Joseph Quinn; Charles Melton
- Cinematography: David J. Thompson
- Edited by: Fin Oates
- Production company: DNA Films
- Distributed by: A24
- Release dates: 16 March 2025 (Music Box Theatre); 11 April 2025 (United States); 18 April 2025 (United Kingdom)
- Running time: 95 minutes
- Countries: United Kingdom; United States
- Language: English
- Budget: $20 million
- Box office: $35.1 million

Warfare is a 2025 war film written and directed by Ray Mendoza (in his directorial debut) and Alex Garland. Based on Mendoza's experiences during the Iraq War as a U.S. Navy SEAL, the film depicts an encounter on 19 November 2006 after the Battle of Ramadi. The script is drawn from the testimonies of the platoon members and is presented in real time. It stars an ensemble cast including D'Pharaoh Woon-A-Tai as Mendoza, alongside Will Poulter, Cosmo Jarvis, Kit Connor, Finn Bennett, Joseph Quinn, and Charles Melton. The film is dedicated to platoon member Elliott Miller (portrayed by Jarvis in the film), who lost his leg and ability to speak in the incident.

Warfare premiered at the Music Box Theatre in Chicago on 16 March 2025, and was released in the United States by A24 on 11 April 2025, and in the United Kingdom on 18 April. The film received positive reviews and grossed $35.1 million worldwide.

== Plot ==
In 2006, after the Battle of Ramadi, U.S. Navy SEAL platoon Alpha One takes control of a two-story house under the cover of darkness. JTAC communications officer Ray Mendoza coordinates air support to monitor their position, while sniper and corpsman Elliott Miller monitors a market down the street with fellow sniper Frank, providing overwatch in support of a joint operation with the Marines.

Iraqi army interpreters Farid and Sidar gather the two families who live on separate floors of the building into one of the bedrooms. The SEALs observe increasing enemy activity, and air support leaves their area. ANGLICO Lieutenant MacDonald radios for air assets while the interpreters warn the enemy has broadcast a call to arms. Leading Officer in Charge Erik and Leading Petty Officer Sam order the interpreters to guard the lower level of the building.

A grenade is thrown in the sniper's room without warning, injuring Elliott. A CASEVAC is called to evacuate him while the SEALs and insurgents exchange gunfire. The team gathers their gear, blows Claymore mines to clear the perimeter, and withdraw through smoke cover toward a waiting U.S. Army M2 Bradley. Farid and Sidar are reluctantly sent out first, before the rest of the team follows behind them. As its ramp drops to receive the squad, an IED explodes. Farid is killed; Sidar flees; Elliott and Sam are severely wounded; Ray, Erik, and Tommy suffer concussions. The injured Bradley crew drives the vehicle away.

Alpha One regroups back in the house, tending to Sam and Elliott's severe injuries. Alpha Two is prevented from redeploying to help Alpha One by firefights in the street. Air support returns, but because enemy fighters are so close to Alpha One's position, MacDonald can only coordinate a show of force. Ray and Erik's traumatic brain injuries cause them to dissociate and become badly disoriented.

Alpha Two arrives at the building and Jake takes command at Erik's request. His request for another CASEVAC is referred up the chain of command for fear of another IED attack and he orders his communications officer, John, to impersonate the brigade's commanding officer to approve their evacuation. The SEALs provide covering fire as Elliott and Sam are successfully evacuated by Bradley. The survivors prepare to defend the house with insurgents converging on them, and order Bradleys to rake the second floor above them with their cannons. Under the cover of another show of force, Alpha One and Alpha Two are transported out of the area by Bradleys under heavy fire. The civilians slowly emerge from the bedroom, relieved the soldiers have left, while insurgents walk into the street.

== Cast ==
With the exception of Mendoza and Miller, all real-life figures were given aliases for their characters.

=== Alpha One Platoon ===
- D'Pharaoh Woon-A-Tai as Ray Mendoza, a JTAC
- Will Poulter as Erik, a Lieutenant and Officer in Charge, leader of Alpha One
- Cosmo Jarvis as Elliott Miller, a Corpsman and lead sniper
- Kit Connor as Tommy, a gunner and the youngest member of Alpha One
- Taylor John Smith as Frank, a sniper
- Michael Gandolfini as USMC Lieutenant 'Mac' MacDonald, an ANGLICO and Fire Support Officer
- Adain Bradley as USMC Sergeant Laerrus, an ANGLICO enlisted Marine assisting McDonald
- Joseph Quinn as Sam, the Leading Petty Officer (based on Joe Hildebrand)
- Nathan Altai as Farid, an Iraqi interpreter assisting Alpha One
- Heider Ali as Sidar, an Iraqi interpreter assisting Alpha One

=== Alpha Two Platoon ===
- Charles Melton as Jake, a Lieutenant J.G. and Assistant Officer in Charge, leader of Alpha Two
- Finn Bennett as John, a communicator/JTAC for Alpha Two
- Noah Centineo as Brian Zawi, a gunner (based on Brian Alazzawi) in Alpha Two
- Evan Holtzman as Brock, a sniper in Alpha Two
- Henry Zaga as Aaron, a point man in Alpha Two
- Alex Brockdorff as Mikey, a point man/gunner in Alpha Two
- Aaron Deakins as Bob, a member of Alpha Two

=== Iraqi Family ===
- Donya Hussen as Noor

== Production ==
In February 2024, it was announced that A24 was developing a war film with Ray Mendoza and Alex Garland attached, which would follow Garland's film Civil War, for which Mendoza was military supervisor. The duo wrote the script and planned to direct the film together. At the time of the announcement, Charles Melton was in negotiations to star, and Joseph Quinn was being considered for the cast. D'Pharaoh Woon-A-Tai was cast to portray Mendoza himself in March 2024, when the title was confirmed to be Warfare, with Kit Connor, Cosmo Jarvis, Will Poulter, and Finn Bennett being added to the cast. That month, Garland announced he would step back from directing films and focus on writing, announcing that his directorial role in Warfare would be more of a supporting role to Mendoza's. In April 2024, Noah Centineo, Taylor John Smith, Adain Bradley, Michael Gandolfini, Henry Zaga, and Evan Holtzman joined the cast. Filming took place at Bovingdon Airfield Studios in the UK. Two songs are used in the film: Eric Prydz's "Call on Me" and Low's "Dancing and Blood".

== Release ==
Warfare was released by A24 in the United States on 11 April 2025. The film premiered at the Hollywood American Legion Theater in Los Angeles on 12 March 2025, in front of veterans and members of the military community and featured a questions and answers session with the directors after the screening. The film had a star-studded red carpet premiere in Los Angeles on 27 March 2025. The film had a UK premiere at Battersea Power Station Cinema on 1 April 2025, which was attended by many of the cast and crew, before going on general release in the UK on 18 April 2025. The film was made available to stream on HBO Max on 12 September 2025.

=== Home media ===
On July 1, 2025, the film was released on Blu-Ray and 4K for home viewing.

== Reception ==
=== Box office ===
Warfare grossed $26 million in the United States and Canada, and $9.1 million in other territories, for a worldwide total of $35.1 million.

In the United States and Canada, Warfare was released alongside The Amateur, Drop, and The King of Kings, and was projected to gross $6–9 million from 2,670 theaters in its opening weekend. The film made $3.6 million on its first day, including an estimated $1.16 million from preview screenings throughout the week. It went on to debut to $8.3 million, finishing fourth at the box office. In its second weekend the film made $4.9 million (a drop of 41%), finishing in fifth.

=== Critical response ===
On the review aggregator website Rotten Tomatoes, 92% of 238 critics' reviews are positive, with an average rating of 7.9/10. The website's consensus reads: "Narratively cut to the bone and geared up with superb filmmaking craft, Warfare evokes the primal terror of combat with unnerving power." Metacritic, which uses a weighted average, assigned the film a score of 78 out of 100, based on 43 critics, indicating "generally favorable" reviews. Audiences polled by CinemaScore gave the film an average grade of "A–" on an A+ to F scale (tied with The Iron Claw for the highest grade earned by an A24 film), while those surveyed by PostTrak gave it a 90% overall positive score, with 67% saying they would definitely recommend the film.

In a five-star review for the BBC, critic Caryn James wrote, "together, Garland's virtuosity and Mendoza's first-hand experience create a masterful technical achievement that is, more important, emotionally harrowing." Critic Wendy Ide of The Guardian also gave Warfare five stars, writing that the film, "doesn't just show you the horrors of war; it forces you to taste the dust and the choking panic, smell the fear and the cordite and the tinny metallic tang of spilled blood", and favorably compared it with other war films such as Saving Private Ryan, Come and See, and All Quiet on the Western Front.

In a mixed review, Gregory Nussen of Deadline Hollywood wrote: "At best, Warfare is an artfully made recreation; at worst it is naked military propaganda set during one of the country's most egregious moments of imperialism."

=== Accolades ===
Award	Date of ceremony	Category	Recipient(s)	Result	Ref.
Astra Film Awards	9 January 2026	Best Action Movie	Warfare	Nominated	
Astra Midseason Movie Awards	3 July 2025	Best Picture	Warfare	Nominated	
Astra Midseason Movie Awards	3 July 2025	Best Stunts	Warfare	Nominated	
Critics' Choice Movie Awards	4 January 2026	Best Sound	Mitch Low, Glenn Freemantle, Ben Barker, Howard Bargroff, and Richard Spooner	Nominated	
Critics' Choice Movie Awards	4 January 2026	Best Stunt Design	Giedrius Nagys	Nominated	
Critics' Choice Super Awards	7 August 2025	Best Action Movie	Warfare	Nominated	
Taormina Film Festival	14 June 2025	Premio Migliore Regia (Best Director Award)	Alex Garland and Ray Mendoza	Won	
British Academy Film Awards	22 February 2026	Best Sound	Glenn Freemantle, Mitch Low, Ben Barker, Howard Bargroff, Richard Spooner	Nominated	
British Independent Film Awards	30 November 2025	Best Casting	Kharmel Cochrane	Nominated	
British Independent Film Awards	30 November 2025	Best Editing	Fin Oates	Won	
British Independent Film Awards	30 November 2025	Best Effects	Simon Stanley-Clamp, Ryan Conder	Won	
British Independent Film Awards	30 November 2025	Best Make-Up & Hair Design	Paul Gooch, Tristan Versluis	Nominated	
British Independent Film Awards	30 November 2025	Best Production Design	Mark Digby	Nominated	
British Independent Film Awards	30 November 2025	Best Sound	Sound team	Won	
British Independent Film Awards	30 November 2025	Best Ensemble Performance	D'Pharaoh Woon-A-Tai, Will Poulter, Cosmo Jarvis, Kit Connor, Finn Bennett, Joseph Quinn, Charles Melton	Won	
Chicago Indie Critics	15 January 2026	Best Sound	Mitch Low, Glenn Freemantle, Ben Barker, Howard Bargroff, Richard Spooner	Nominated	
Columbus Film Critics Association	8 January 2026	Best Overlooked Film	Warfare	Won	
Denver Film Critics Society	25 January 2026	Best Sound	Sound team	Nominated	
Film Independent Spirit Awards	15 February 2026	Best Cinematography	David J. Thompson	Nominated	
Film Independent Spirit Awards	15 February 2026	Best Editing	Fin Oates	Nominated	
Latino Entertainment Journalists Association	9 February 2026	Best Stunts	Giedrius Nagys	Nominated	
St Louis Film Critics Association Awards	14 December 2025	Best Action Film	Warfare	Nominated	
St Louis Film Critics Association Awards	14 December 2025	Best Stunts	Giedrius Nagys	Nominated	
San Diego Film Critics Society Awards	15 December 2025	Best Sound Design	Sound team	Won	
Utah Film Critics Association Awards	17 January 2026	Best Ensemble	Warfare cast	Nominated	
Utah Film Critics Association Awards	17 January 2026	Best Film Editing	Fin Oates	Won	
Utah Film Critics Association Awards	17 January 2026	Best Sound Editing	Sound team	Won	
Kansas City Film Critics Circle Awards	21 December 2025	Best Stunt Ensemble Film	Stunt team	Nominated	
Portland Critics Association	31 December 2025	Best Sound Design	Sound team	Won	
Portland Critics Association	31 December 2025	Best Film Editing	Fin Oates	Nominated	
Portland Critics Association	31 December 2025	Best Stunts or Action Choreography	Giedrius Nagys	Runner-up	
Minnesota Film Critics Association	2 January 2026	Best Sound	Sound team	Nominated	
New Jersey Film Critics Circle	31 December 2025	Best Sound	Sound team	Won	
North Carolina Film Critics Association	26 January 2026	Best Sound Design	Sound team	Nominated	
Music City Film Critics Association	12 January 2026	Best Sound	Sound team	Nominated	
Online Film & Television Association	15 February 2026	Best Sound	Sound team	Nominated	
Visual Effects Society Awards	25 February 2026	Outstanding Supporting Visual Effects in a Photoreal Feature	Simon Stanley-Clamp, Kaley Edwards, Andrew Kinnear, Samir Ansari, Ryan Conder	Nominated	
Association Of Motion Picture Sound	27 January 2026	Excellence in Sound for a Feature Film	Howard Bargroff, Stéphane Malenfant, Mitchell Low, Glenn Freemantle, Gillian Dodders	Nominated	
