= Alex Garland =

British writer and director (born 1970)

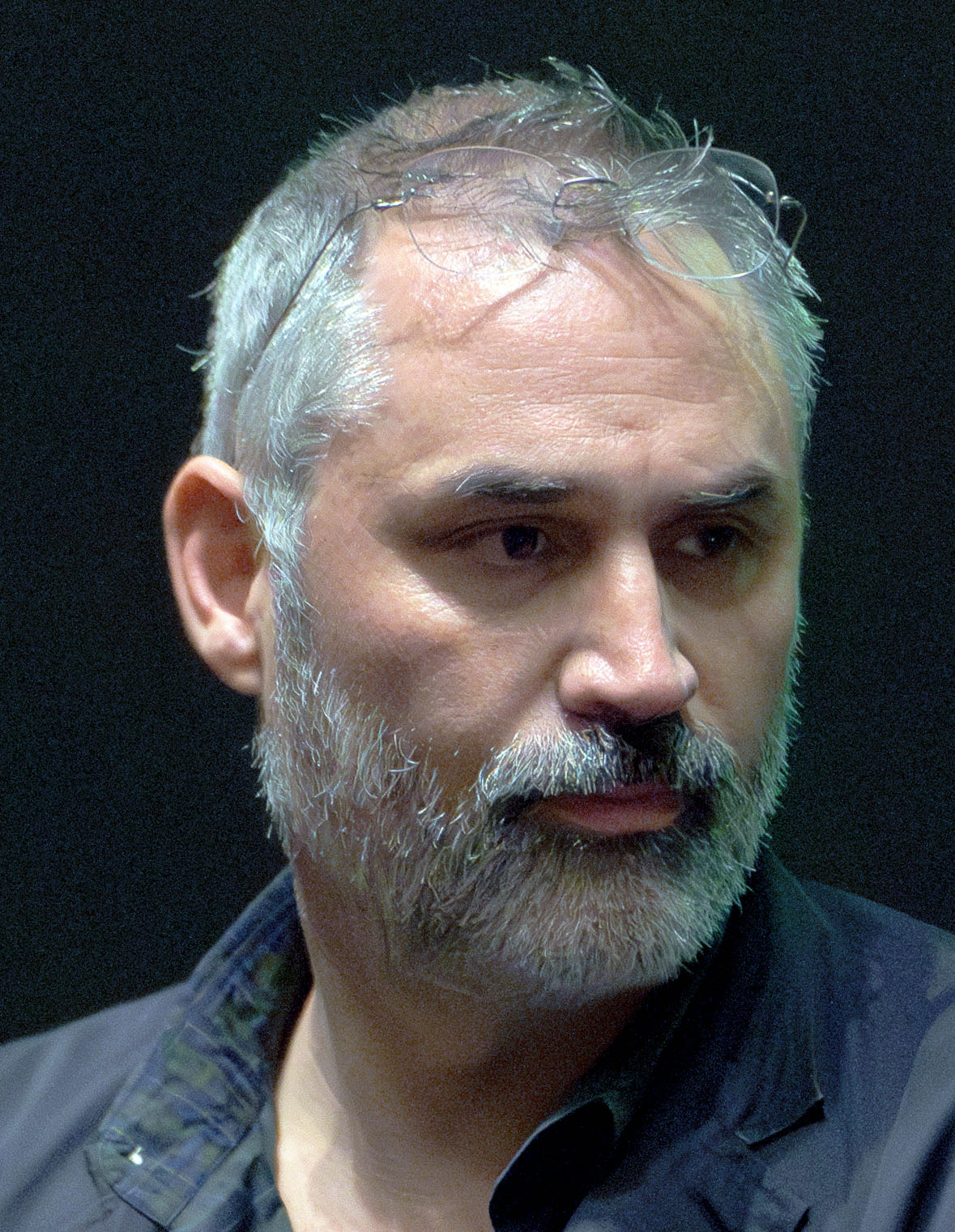
- Garland at SXSW in 2024
- Born: Alexander Medawar Garland; 26 May 1970 (age 56); London, England
- Education: University College School; University of Manchester
- Occupations: Author; screenwriter; film director; television director
- Years active: 1996–present
- Spouse: Paloma Baeza
- Children: 2
- Father: Nicholas Garland
- Relatives: Peter Medawar (maternal grandfather); Jean Medawar (maternal grandmother)

Alexander Medawar Garland (26 May 1970) is an English author and filmmaker. He rose to prominence with his novel The Beach (1996). He received praise for writing the Danny Boyle films 28 Days Later (2002) and its sequel, 28 Years Later (2025), and Sunshine (2007), as well as Never Let Me Go (2010) and Dredd (2012). In video games, he co-wrote Enslaved: Odyssey to the West (2010) and was a story supervisor on DmC: Devil May Cry (2013).

Garland made his directorial debut when he wrote and directed the sci-fi thriller Ex Machina (2014). The film earned him an Academy Award nomination for Best Original Screenplay, and won three British Independent Film Awards, including Best Screenplay, Best Director, and Best British Independent Film for the film. Garland subsequently directed the films Annihilation (2018), Men (2022), and Civil War (2024). He also co-directed the war film Warfare (2025) and wrote, directed and executive produced the FX miniseries Devs (2020).

== Early life and education ==
Alexander Medawar Garland was born in London on 26 May 1970, the son of psychologist Caroline (née Medawar) and political cartoonist Nicholas Garland. Alexander has a younger brother and two older paternal half-siblings. He is the maternal grandson of writer Jean Medawar and Nobel Prize-winning biologist Peter Medawar. Garland was educated at University College School in Hampstead and graduated from the University of Manchester in Manchester with an art history degree.

== Career ==
=== Novels ===
Garland's first novel, The Beach, was published in 1996. Based on his travels across Europe and Thailand, it tells the story of a young English backpacker who discovers an unspoiled seashore occupied by a community of like-minded backpackers. The novel is noted for its references to drug culture, sequences of hallucinations, and unique depictions of excess and utopia. The Beach was initially met with positive reviews, and with a spreading word of mouth response, the novel grew in popularity; it led some critics to regard Garland a key voice of Generation X. He would later speak of his discomfort with the fame The Beach brought him. The Beach has been translated into 25 different languages and sold close to 700,000 copies by the start of 1999. It was developed into the 2000 film starring Leonardo DiCaprio. In 2003, the novel was Ranked 103 in BBC's The Big Read poll.

Garland's The Tesseract (1998) is a non-linear narrative with several interwoven characters, set in Manila, Philippines. The novel is characterized by a post-modernist narrative style and structure. It explores several themes such as love and violence through each character's circumstance and context of surroundings as well as seemingly inconsequential actions and the repercussions of those actions on other characters. The Tesseract was not a critical or commercial success, but it too was adapted into a film. Throughout his work, Garland has expressed his love of travel (particularly backpacking) and his love of Manila, much of which influenced his work.

=== Film ===
In 2002, Garland wrote the screenplay for Danny Boyle's film 28 Days Later, starring Cillian Murphy. He has said that the script was influenced by 1970s zombie films and English science fiction such as The Day of the Triffids. The Resident Evil video game series also influenced 28 Days Later, with Garland crediting the first game for revitalising the zombie genre. Inspiration for the "Rage" virus came from real-world infections such as Ebola and filoviruses. He won a Best Screenplay honor at the 2004 Fangoria Chainsaw Awards for his script of the film.

In 2005, Garland wrote a screenplay for a film adaptation of Halo. D. B. Weiss and Josh Olson rewrote this during 2006 for a 2008 release, although the film was later canceled. In 2007, he wrote the screenplay for the film Sunshine, which was his second screenplay to be directed by Danny Boyle and to star Cillian Murphy. Garland served as an executive producer on 28 Weeks Later, the sequel of 28 Days Later. He wrote the screenplay for the 2010 film Never Let Me Go, based on the novel by Kazuo Ishiguro. He also wrote the script for Dredd, an adaptation of the Judge Dredd comic book series from 2000 AD. In 2018, Karl Urban, who played the eponymous role in the film, stated that it was Garland who deserved credit for also directing Dredd.

Garland made his directorial debut with Ex Machina, a 2014 feature film based on his own story and screenplay, starring Domhnall Gleeson, Alicia Vikander and Oscar Isaac. The film won a Jury Prize at the 2015 Gerardmer Film Festival, and earned Garland a nomination for an Academy Award for Best Original Screenplay. Garland's second film, Annihilation (2018), was based on the 2014 novel by Jeff VanderMeer. Garland described it as "an adaptation [that] was a memory of the book", rather than book-referenced screenwriting, to capture the "dream like nature" and tone of his reading experience. Production began in 2016, and the film was released in February 2018. Also in 2018, it was reported that Garland had written a fantasy film script titled The Toymaker's Secret, and centering around a toymaker whose creations come to life and co-exist with him peacefully until a young woman and her kid move in.

In January 2021, Garland was hired to direct his third film, Men, starring Jessie Buckley and Rory Kinnear. The film follows a young woman who goes on a holiday to the English countryside after the death of her ex-husband. Released in May 2022, it received generally positive reviews, though its narrative approach received some criticism. Film critic Jonathan Rosenbaum placed Men on his Best Films of 2022 list.

In April 2022, it was announced that Garland would once again work with A24 for his fourth feature, Civil War, an action epic starring Kirsten Dunst, Wagner Moura, and previous collaborators Stephen McKinley Henderson and Cailee Spaeny. The film was released on 12 April 2024. Garland reunited with Boyle to write 28 Years Later, the long-gestating sequel to 28 Days Later, which was the first of an ongoing trilogy of zombie films. The film was released by Sony on 20 June 2025. Its sequel 28 Years Later: The Bone Temple, which Garland returned to write, was released on 13 January 2026, and was directed by Nia DaCosta. Garland is slated to write the yet unnamed third film in the 28 Years Later trilogy, which will again be directed by Boyle and serve as the fifth overall instalment in the 28 Days Later film series.

In February 2024, it was revealed that Charles Melton was in talks to star in Garland's upcoming untitled war film with A24. This project marks the second collaboration between Garland and Ray Mendoza, who served as the military supervisor for Civil War. The pair wrote and co-directed the film. The following month, Joseph Quinn, D'Pharaoh Woon-A-Tai, Kit Connor, Cosmo Jarvis, Will Poulter and Finn Bennett joined the ensemble cast, and the film was revealed to be titled Warfare. The same month, Garland stated that he would not direct any films in the "foreseeable future" after the release of Civil War and that his co-directorial work on Warfare was "more of a supporting character" to Mendoza's. However, in May 2025, it was announced that Garland's next project would be a film adaptation of the 2022 video game Elden Ring. In October, it was announced Garland would start shooting an untitled sci-fi film in 2027, with Zendaya starring.

=== Television ===
Garland wrote, served as executive producer, and directed the eight-episode miniseries Devs about the "mysterious ongoings at a tech company", for FX. The series was greenlit in August 2018, and premiered 5 March 2020 on FX on Hulu. It stars Ex Machina and Annihilation actress Sonoya Mizuno, alongside Nick Offerman, Jin Ha, Zach Grenier, Stephen McKinley Henderson, Cailee Spaeny, and Alison Pill. Spaeny, who did not audition for the role as Garland had wanted her specifically for it said that Devs was short for Development, and the series would explore the idea of the multiverse.

In May 2022, a television series based on Never Let Me Go was optioned at FX, to be executive produced by Garland, who previously wrote the screenplay for the 2010 film adaptation. It would have premiered on Hulu in the United States, Star in other territories and Star+ in Latin America with Viola Prettejohn, Tracey Ullman and Kelly Macdonald starring. In February 2023, it was announced that FX had cancelled the series before production began.

=== Video games ===
Garland and Tameem Antoniades co-wrote the video game Enslaved: Odyssey to the West for the PlayStation 3 and Xbox 360. They won a 2011 award from the Writer's Guild of Great Britain. Garland also served as a story supervisor on the game DmC: Devil May Cry in 2013.

== Personal life ==
Garland is married to English-Mexican actress Paloma Baeza, with whom he has a son and a daughter. He is an atheist. Garland has described himself as politically left, but has expressed concern over increasing political polarisation, particularly in America. He cited this concern as a core inspiration for his film Civil War.

== Filmography ==
Film

Year	Title	Director	Writer	Producer
2002	28 Days Later	No	Yes	No
2007	Sunshine	No	Yes	No
2007	28 Weeks Later	No	Uncredited (Note: Rewrites.)	Executive
2010	Never Let Me Go	No	Yes	Executive
2012	Dredd	Uncredited (Note: While Pete Travis was credited as the director, it was Garland who actually completed the film.)	Yes	Yes
2014	Ex Machina	Yes	Yes	No
2018	Annihilation	Yes	Yes	No
2022	Men	Yes	Yes	No
2024	Civil War	Yes	Yes	No
2025	Warfare	Yes (Note: Co-directed with Ray Mendoza.)	Yes	No
2025	28 Years Later	No	Yes	Yes
2026	28 Years Later: The Bone Temple	No	Yes	Yes
2027	Stages	No	No	Yes
2028	Elden Ring	Yes	Yes	No

Miniseries

Year	Title	Director	Writer	Executive Producer	Creator
2020	Devs	Yes	Yes	Yes	Yes

Video game

- Enslaved: Odyssey to the West (2010), co-writer
- DmC: Devil May Cry (2013), story supervisor

Other credits

- The Beach (2000), cartographer, based on his 1996 novel
- The Tesseract (2003), based on his 1998 novel
- Big Game (2014), executive producer

== Theatre ==
- The Coma (Edinburgh Festival Fringe, 2006), based on his 2004 novel

== Bibliography ==
- The Beach (1996)
- The Tesseract (1998)
- The Coma (2004)

== Collaborators ==
Garland has worked with several actors and crew members multiple times.

Collaborator	Ex Machina	Annihilation	Devs	Men	Civil War	Warfare	Elden Ring	Total
Geoff Barrow Composer	Yes	Yes	Yes	Yes	Yes			5
Kharmel Cochrane Casting director				Yes		Yes	Yes	3
Kit Connor Actor						Yes	Yes	2
Michelle Day Set decorator	Yes	Yes	Yes	Yes		Yes	Yes	6
Mark Digby Production designer	Yes	Yes	Yes	Yes		Yes	Yes	6
Karl Glusman Actor			Yes		Yes			2
Glenn Freemantle Sound designer	Yes	Yes	Yes	Yes	Yes	Yes	Yes	7
Jin Ha Actor			Yes		Yes			2
Rob Hardy Cinematographer	Yes	Yes	Yes	Yes	Yes			5
Oscar Isaac Actor	Yes	Yes						2
Andrew Macdonald Producer	Yes	Yes	Yes	Yes	Yes	Yes	Yes	7
Francine Maisler Casting director	Yes	Yes			Yes			3
Stephen McKinley Henderson Actor			Yes		Yes			2
Sonoya Mizuno Actor	Yes	Yes	Yes	Yes	Yes		Yes	6
Nick Offerman Actor			Yes		Yes		Yes	3
Barney Pilling Editor		Yes					Yes	2
Allon Reich Producer	Yes	Yes	Yes	Yes	Yes	Yes	Yes	7
Peter Rice Producer						Yes	Yes	2
Jake Roberts Editor			Yes	Yes	Yes			3
Ben Salisbury Composer	Yes	Yes	Yes	Yes	Yes			5
Cailee Spaeny Actor			Yes		Yes		Yes	3
David J. Thompson Cinematographer						Yes	Yes	2

== Critical reception ==
Title	Rotten Tomatoes	Metacritic
Ex Machina	92% (284 ratings)	78 (42 reviews)
Annihilation	88% (327 ratings)	79 (51 reviews)
Devs	82% (90 ratings)	71 (32 reviews)
Men	69% (255 ratings)	65 (55 reviews)
Civil War	81% (391 ratings)	75 (60 reviews)
Warfare	93% (223 ratings)	77 (16 reviews)

== Awards and nominations ==
Year	Film	Award	Category	Result
2002	28 Days Later	Fangoria Chainsaw Awards	Best Screenplay	Nominated
2002	28 Days Later	Hugo Awards	Best Dramatic Presentation – Long Form	Nominated
2002	28 Days Later	Saturn Award	Best Writing	Nominated
2010	Never Let Me Go	British Independent Film Awards	Best Screenplay	Nominated
2010	Never Let Me Go	Evening Standard British Film Awards	Best Screenplay	Nominated
2010	Never Let Me Go	Saturn Award	Best Writing	Nominated
2010	Enslaved: Odyssey to the West	Writers' Guild of Great Britain	Best Continuing Drama	Won
2015	Ex Machina	Academy Awards	Best Original Screenplay	Nominated
2015	Ex Machina	Alliance of Women Film Journalists	Best Writing, Original Screenplay	Nominated
2015	Ex Machina	Austin Film Critics Association	Best Original Screenplay	Nominated
2015	Ex Machina	AACTA International Awards	Best Screenplay	Nominated
2015	Ex Machina	BAFTA Awards	Outstanding British Film	Nominated
2015	Ex Machina	BAFTA Awards	Best Original Screenplay	Nominated
2015	Ex Machina	BAFTA Awards	Outstanding Debut by a British Writer, Director or Producer	Nominated
2015	Ex Machina	Boston Society of Film Critics Awards	Best New Filmmaker	Nominated
2015	Ex Machina	British Independent Film Awards	Best British Independent Film	Won
2015	Ex Machina	British Independent Film Awards	Best Director	Won
2015	Ex Machina	British Independent Film Awards	Best Screenplay	Won
2015	Ex Machina	Broadcast Film Critics Association Awards	Best Screenplay	Nominated
2015	Ex Machina	Chicago Film Critics Association Awards	Most Promising Filmmaker	Nominated
2015	Ex Machina	Chicago Film Critics Association Awards	Best Original Screenplay	Nominated
2015	Ex Machina	Directors Guild of America Award	Outstanding Directing – First-Time Feature Film	Won
2015	Ex Machina	European Film Awards	Best European Screenwriter	Nominated
2015	Ex Machina	Florida Film Critics Circle Awards	Best Screenplay	Nominated
2015	Ex Machina	Gérardmer Film Festival	Jury Prize	Won
2015	Ex Machina	Imagine Film Festival	Silver Scream Award	Won
2015	Ex Machina	London Critics Circle Film Awards	Breakthrough British/Irish Filmmaker	Nominated
2015	Ex Machina	Online Film Critics Society Awards	Best Original Screenplay	Nominated
2015	Ex Machina	San Diego Film Critics Society	Best Original Screenplay	Nominated
2015	Ex Machina	San Francisco Film Critics Circle	Best Original Screenplay	Nominated
2015	Ex Machina	Toronto Film Critics Association Awards	Best First Feature	Won
2015	Ex Machina	Washington DC Area Film Critics Association Awards	Best Director	Nominated
2015	Ex Machina	Washington DC Area Film Critics Association Awards	Best Original Screenplay	Nominated
2015	Ex Machina	Saturn Awards	Best Director	Nominated
2015	Ex Machina	Saturn Awards	Best Writing	Nominated
2025	Civil War	Writers Guild of America Awards	Best Original Screenplay	Nominated
2025	Warfare	Taormina Film Festival	Premio Migliore Regia (Best Director Award) (with Ray Mendoza)	Won
2026	28 Years Later	BAFTA Awards	Outstanding British Film	Nominated
