= Peter Medawar =

Brazilian-British biologist (1915–1987)

Sir Peter Medawar OM CH CBE FRS
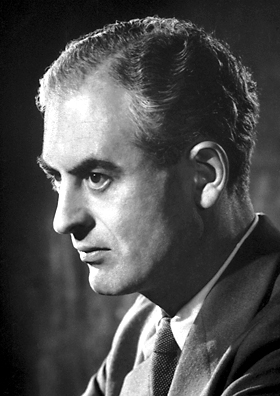
- Medawar in 1960
- Born: Peter Brian Medawar; 28 February 1915; Petrópolis, Brazil
- Died: 2 October 1987 (aged 72); London, UK
- Citizenship: British; Brazil (until 1933)
- Education: Magdalen College, Oxford (BA, DSc)
- Known for: Immunological tolerance Organ transplantation
- Spouse: Jean Medawar (m. 1937)
- Children: 4
- Relatives: Alex Garland (grandson); Nicholas Garland (ex-son-in-law)
- Awards: Royal Medal (1959); Nobel Prize (1960); Copley Medal (1969); Kalinga Prize (1985); Faraday Prize (1987)
- Scientific career
- Workplaces: University of Birmingham; University College London; National Institute for Medical Research
- Thesis: Growth promoting and growth inhibiting factors in normal and abnormal development (1941)
- Doctoral students: Leslie Brent; Avrion Mitchison
- Other notable students: Rupert E. Billingham (postdoc)

Sir Peter Brian Medawar (/ˈmɛdəwər/; 28 February 1915 – 2 October 1987) was a Brazilian-born biologist and writer of Lebanese-British descent who, from a succession of research and teaching posts (Oxford through the Royal Institution), and senior U.K. biomedical leadership positions (MRC and RPMC), contributed seminal discoveries in immunology, including one honoured by a Nobel Prize to him and Australian Mac Burnet in 1960. Medawar's works on the discovery of acquired immune tolerance, and on graft rejection, have been fundamental to the medical practice of tissue and organ transplants. For his scientific work, he has been termed the "father of transplantation". He is remembered, as well, for his wit, both in person and in his popular writings. Richard Dawkins referred to him as "the wittiest of all scientific writers"; Stephen Jay Gould as "the cleverest man I have ever known".

Medawar was the youngest child of a Lebanese father and a British mother, and a Brazilian and British citizen by birth. He prepared for university admission at a public secondary school, Marlborough College, about which he had ill feelings generally, but was positive with regard to his biology teacher, Ashley Gordon Lowndes. He then pursued his university training in zoology under John Young at Magdalen College, Oxford; after a scholarship and fellowship there, he went on to hold named professorial positions in zoology at the University of Birmingham and University College London. Until he was partially disabled by a cerebral infarction, he was Director of the National Institute for Medical Research (at Mill Hill).

With his Oxford, then Birmingham trainees, doctoral student Leslie Brent and postdoctoral fellow Rupert E. Billingham, he demonstrated the principle of acquired immunological tolerance (the phenomenon of unresponsiveness of the immune system to certain molecules), which was theoretically predicted by Mac Burnet. The understanding of immunological tolerance became the foundation of tissue and organ transplantation. He and Burnet shared the 1960 Nobel Prize in Physiology or Medicine "for discovery of acquired immunological tolerance".

== Early life and education ==
Medawar is stated as having been born on 28 February 1915 in Rio de Janeiro, Brazil, a place his parents had taken residence, and elsewhere as having been born in Petrópolis, a Brazilian Imperial City, 40 kilometres (25 mi) north of Rio de Janeiro city. He was the third of three children of his British mother Edith Muriel (née Dowling), and his father, a naturalised British citizen, Nicholas Agnatius Medawar, who had been born in the village of Jounieh, north of Beirut, Lebanon. He had a brother Philip and a sister Pamela. (Pamela was later married to Sir David Hunt, who served as Private Secretary to prime ministers Clement Attlee and Winston Churchill.) His father, a Lebanese Maronite by heritage, worked for a British dental supplies manufacturer that sent him to Brazil as an agent. He later described his father's profession as selling "false teeth in South America". Peter Medawar's status as a British citizen was acquired at birth, as he said, "My birth was registered at the British Consulate in good time to acquire the status of 'natural-born British subject'."

Medawar left Brazil with his family for England at the end of World War I, in 1918 and he lived there for the rest of his life. According to other accounts, he moved to England when he was 13 (i.e., 1928–1929) or 14 (i.e., 1929–1930). Under Brazilian nationality law, he had Brazilian citizenship from having been born there (jus soli). When he turned 18, the age at which Brazilians are liable to conscription, he applied for exemption to Joaquim Pedro Salgado Filho, his godfather and the then Minister of Aviation. This was denied by Eurico Gaspar Dutra (who was the war minister under president Getúlio Vargas), so Medawar renounced his Brazilian citizenship.

In 1928, before university, Medawar went to the U.K. secondary educational institution, the public school, Marlborough College, in Wiltshire. (That school, while not disclosed in his autobiography, is explicitly disclosed in other media venues, including an extensive 1984 profile in New Scientist, a profile in which he is quoted as identifying the school.)

Medawar has spoken—in statements reproduced in quotation—both negatively and positively about his secondary school; on the one hand, he has noted that his classmates "were critical and querulous at the same time, wondering what kind of person [he, ] a Lebanese was—something foreign you can be sure", and that the school emphasised sport, an area in which he was weak. Medawar refers to himself, again in his own words, as "uniformly unhappy from beginning to end" in his time at Marlborough, reflecting—in addition to the response of fellow students to his foreign heritage—that he witnessed bullying there, things that left him "resentful and disgusted at the manners and mores of [what he viewed as that] essentially tribal institution" the rest of his life. (He would go in his statements to further liken Marlborough to the training schools for the Nazi SS, "founded upon the twin pillars of sex and sadism.") With regard to their biology instruction, Medawar found anatomical dissection of animals, an area in which he was weak, to be "pedagogically useless and exasperatingly boring"; the school dictum's about which was, by Medawar's description, "[b]loody foolish is the boy whose drawing of his dissection differs in any way whatsoever from... the textbook."

On the other hand, he reflects positively upon his time under his Marlborough biology instructor, Ashley Gordon Lowndes, to whom he has referred as a "very, very good biology teacher". Despite describing him as being "almost incapable of expressing himself", Medawar states that Lowndes, who received a ScD from Cambridge University while teaching, was "quite good", going on to say,

He fired me with enthusiasm. He adored his subject, and was so passionate about it that that communicated itself[,]

such that a media profile of him credits this relationship and institution with being the place where Medawar's "scientific career took its start". (Lowndes had also taught professors and Royal Society fellows J.Z. Young and R.J. Pumphrey.) Noting the need his family felt that he get a scholarship to Oxford—one of the motivations for Medawar's attending Marlborough—he noted that he did not win such, and that he had "never been any good at competitive exams".

Nevertheless, in 1932, he went on to Magdalen College, Oxford, graduating with a first-class honours degree in zoology in 1935. Medawar was then appointed a Christopher Welch scholar, and then a senior demy of Magdalen in 1935. He also worked at the Sir William Dunn School of Pathology supervised by Howard Florey (later Nobel laureate, and who inspired him to take up immunology) and completed his doctoral thesis in 1941. In 1938, he became Fellow of Magdalen through an examination, the position he held until 1944. It was there that he started working with J. Z. Young on the regeneration of nerves. His invention of a nerve glue proved useful in surgical operations of severed nerves during World War II.

The University of Oxford approved his Doctor of Philosophy thesis titled "Growth promoting and growth inhibiting factors in normal and abnormal development" in 1941, but because of the prohibitive cost of supplication (the process by which the degree is officially conferred), he spent the money on his urgent appendicectomy instead. The University of Oxford later awarded him a Doctor of Science degree in 1947.

== Career and research ==
After completing his PhD, Medawar was appointed a Rolleston Prizeman in 1942, senior research fellow of St John's College, Oxford, in 1944, and a university demonstrator in zoology and comparative anatomy, also in 1944. He was re-elected fellow of Magdalen from 1946 to 1947. In 1947, he became Mason Professor of Zoology at the University of Birmingham and worked there until 1951. He transferred to University College London in 1951 as Jodrell Professor of Zoology and Comparative Anatomy.

In 1962, he was appointed director of the National Institute for Medical Research. His predecessor Sir Charles Harrington was an able administrator such that taking over his post was, as he described, "[N]o more strenuous than ... sliding over into the driving-seat of a Rolls-Royce". He was head of the transplantation section of the Medical Research Council's clinical research centre at Harrow from 1971 to 1986. He became professor of experimental medicine at the Royal Institution (1977–1983), and president of the Royal Postgraduate Medical School (1981–1987).

=== Immunology ===
Medawar's first scientific research was on the effect of malt on the development of connective tissue cells (mesenchyme) in chicken. Reading the draft of the manuscript, Howard Florey commented that it was more philosophical than scientific. It was published in the Quarterly Journal of Experimental Physiology in 1937.

Medawar's involvement with what became transplant research began during World War II, when he investigated possible improvements in skin grafts. His first publication on the subject was "Sheets of Pure Epidermal Epithelium from Human Skin", which was published in Nature in 1941. His studies particularly concerned solution for skin wounds among soldiers in the war. In 1947, he moved to the University of Birmingham, taking along with him his PhD student Leslie Brent and postdoctoral fellow Rupert Billingham. His research became more focused in 1949, when Australian biologist Frank Macfarlane Burnet, at the Walter and Eliza Hall Institute of Medical Research in Melbourne, advanced the hypothesis that during embryonic life and immediately after birth, cells gradually acquire the ability to distinguish between their own tissue substances on the one hand and unwanted cells and foreign material on the other.

With Billingham, he published a seminal paper in 1951 on grafting technique. Santa J. Ono, the American immunologist, has described the enduring impact of this paper to modern science. Based on this technique of grafting, Medawar's team devised a method to test Burnet's hypothesis. They extracted cells from young mouse embryos and injected them into another mouse of different strains. When the mouse developed into adult and skin grafting from that of the original strain was performed, there was no tissue rejection. The mouse had tolerated the foreign tissue, which would normally be rejected. Their experimental proof of Burnet's hypothesis was first published in a brief article in Nature in 1953, followed by a series of papers, and a comprehensive description in Philosophical Transactions of the Royal Society B in 1956, giving the name "actively acquired tolerance".

==== Research outcomes ====
Medawar was awarded his Nobel Prize in 1960 with Burnet for their work in tissue grafting which is the basis of organ transplants, and their discovery of acquired immunological tolerance. This work was used in dealing with skin grafts required after burns. Medawar's work resulted in a shift of emphasis in the science of immunology from one that attempts to deal with the fully developed immunity mechanism to one that attempts to alter the immunity mechanism itself, as in the attempt to suppress the body's rejection of organ transplants. It directly laid the foundation for the first successful organ transplantation in humans, specifically kidney transplantation, carried out by an American physician Joseph Murray, who eventually received the 1990 Nobel Prize in Physiology or Medicine.

=== Theory of senescence ===
Medawar's 1951 lecture "An Unsolved Problem of Biology" (published 1952) addressed ageing and senescence, and he begins by defining both terms as follows:

We obviously need a word for mere ageing, and I propose to use 'ageing' itself for just that purpose. 'Ageing' hereafter stands for mere ageing, and has no other innuendo. I shall use the word 'senescence' to mean ageing accompanied by that decline of bodily faculties and sensibilities and energies which ageing colloquially entails.

He then tackles the question of why evolution has permitted organisms to senesce, even though (1) senescence lowers individual fitness, and (2) there is no obvious necessity for senescence. In answering this question, Medawar provides two fundamental and interrelated insights. First, there is an inexorable decline in probability of an organism's existence, and, therefore, in what he terms "reproductive value." He suggests that it therefore follows that the force of natural selection weakens progressively with age late in life (because the fecundity of younger age-groups is overwhelmingly more significant in producing the next generation). What happens to an organism after reproduction is only weakly reflected in natural selection by the effect on its younger relatives. He pointed out that likelihood of death at various times of life, as judged by life tables, was an indirect measure of fitness, that is, the capacity of an organism to propagate its genes. Life tables for humans show, for example that the lowest likelihood of death in human females comes at about age 14, which in primitive societies would likely be an age of peak reproduction. This has served as the basis for all three modern theories for the evolution of senescence.

=== Theory on endocrine evolution ===
Medawar presented a talk on viviparity in animals (the phenomenon by which some animals give live birth) at a meeting on evolution at Oxford in July 1952. Later published in 1953, he introduced an aphorism:

Endocrine evolution is not an evolution of hormones but an evolution of the uses to which they are put; an evolution not, to put it crudely, of chemical formulae but of reactivities, reaction patterns and tissue competences.

The notion that evolution and diversity of endocrine function in animals are due to different uses of each hormone rather than different hormones themselves became an established fact. The paper is also regarded as a pioneer in the field of reproductive immunology.

== Personal life ==
Medawar never knew the exact meaning of his surname, an Arabic word, he was told, for "to make round"; but which a friend explained to him as "little round fat man".

On 27 February 1937, Medawar married Jean Medawar (née Taylor). They met while in graduate class at Oxford, he at Magdalen and Taylor at Somerville College. Taylor approached him for the meaning of "heuristic", which she had to ask twice, and he had to finally offer lessons in philosophy. Medawar described her as "the most beautiful woman in Oxford"; but Taylor's impression was he looked "mildly diabolical." Taylor's family objected to their marriage as Medawar had "no background, and no money." Her mother was explicitly afraid of having "black" grandchildren; her aunt disinherited her. The couple had two sons, Charles and Alexander, and two daughters, Caroline and Louise. One of his grandchildren, through Caroline, is screenwriter and director Alex Garland.

Medawar was interested in a wide range of subjects including opera, philosophy and cricket. He was exceptionally tall, 6 ft 5 inches (196 cm), and physically robust, with a big voice noted particularly during his lectures. He was renowned for wit and humour, which he claimed he inherited from his "raucous" mother.

As he completed his PhD research in 1941, he did not receive the degree as he could not afford the requisite £25, to which he commented:

I'm an impostor. I am a doctor, but not a PhD. It was so expensive, I decided not to take one. Morally I'm a PhD, in the sense I could have had one... Anyway, it was unfashionable in my day. John Young was not a PhD either. A PhD was regarded then as a newfangled German importation, as bizarre and undesirable as having German bands playing on streetcorners...

He was regarded as the philosopher Karl Popper's best-known disciple in science.

=== Views on religion ===
Medawar declared:

I believe that a reasonable case can be made for saying, not that we believe in God because He exists but rather that He exists because we believe in Him... Considered as an element of the world, God has the same degree and kind of objective reality as do other products of mind... I regret my disbelief in God and religious answers generally, for I believe it would give satisfaction and comfort to many in need of it if it were possible to discover and propound good scientific and philosophic reasons to believe in God... To abdicate from the rule of reason and substitute for it an authentication of belief by the intentness and degree of conviction with which we hold it can be perilous and destructive... I am a rationalist—something of a period piece nowadays, I admit...

Although he normally sympathised with Christianity especially on moral teachings, he found the Biblical stories unethical and was "shocked by the way in which [Biblical] characters deceived and defrauded each other." He even asked his wife "to make sure that such a book did not fall into the hands of [their] children."

Nonetheless, he also said the following, which suggests that although religion has good value for humans in aggregate, it does not help them all equally:

Religion has not sustained me on any of the occasions when the comfort it professes would have been most welcome.

== Later life and death ==
In 1959 Medawar was invited by the BBC to present the broadcaster's annual Reith Lectures—following in the footsteps of his colleague, J. Z. Young, who was Reith Lecturer in 1950. For his own series of six radio broadcasts, titled The Future of Man, Medawar examined how the human race might continue to evolve.

While attending the annual British Association meeting in 1969, Medawar suffered a stroke when reading the lesson at Exeter Cathedral, a duty which falls on every new President of the British Association. It was, as he said, "monstrous bad luck because Jim Whyte Black had not yet devised beta-blockers, which slow the heart-beat and could have preserved my health and my career". Before the stroke, Medawar was regarded one of the most influential scientists, as Kern Wildenthal (president of the University of Texas Southwestern Medical Center) put it: "He was the most brilliant biologist, the most influentiai scientific thinker, the most lucid writer and the most scintillating conversationist of the 20th century."

After the impairment of his speech and movement, Medawar, with his wife's help, reorganised his life and continued to write and do research though on a greatly restricted scale. However, he suffered further strokes, and in 1987 he died in the Royal Free Hospital, London. He is interred with his wife Jean (1913–2005) in the graveyard of St Andrew's Church in Alfriston in East Sussex. In 2024 Medawar's family donated his Nobel Prize medal to the University of Oxford.

== Awards and honours ==
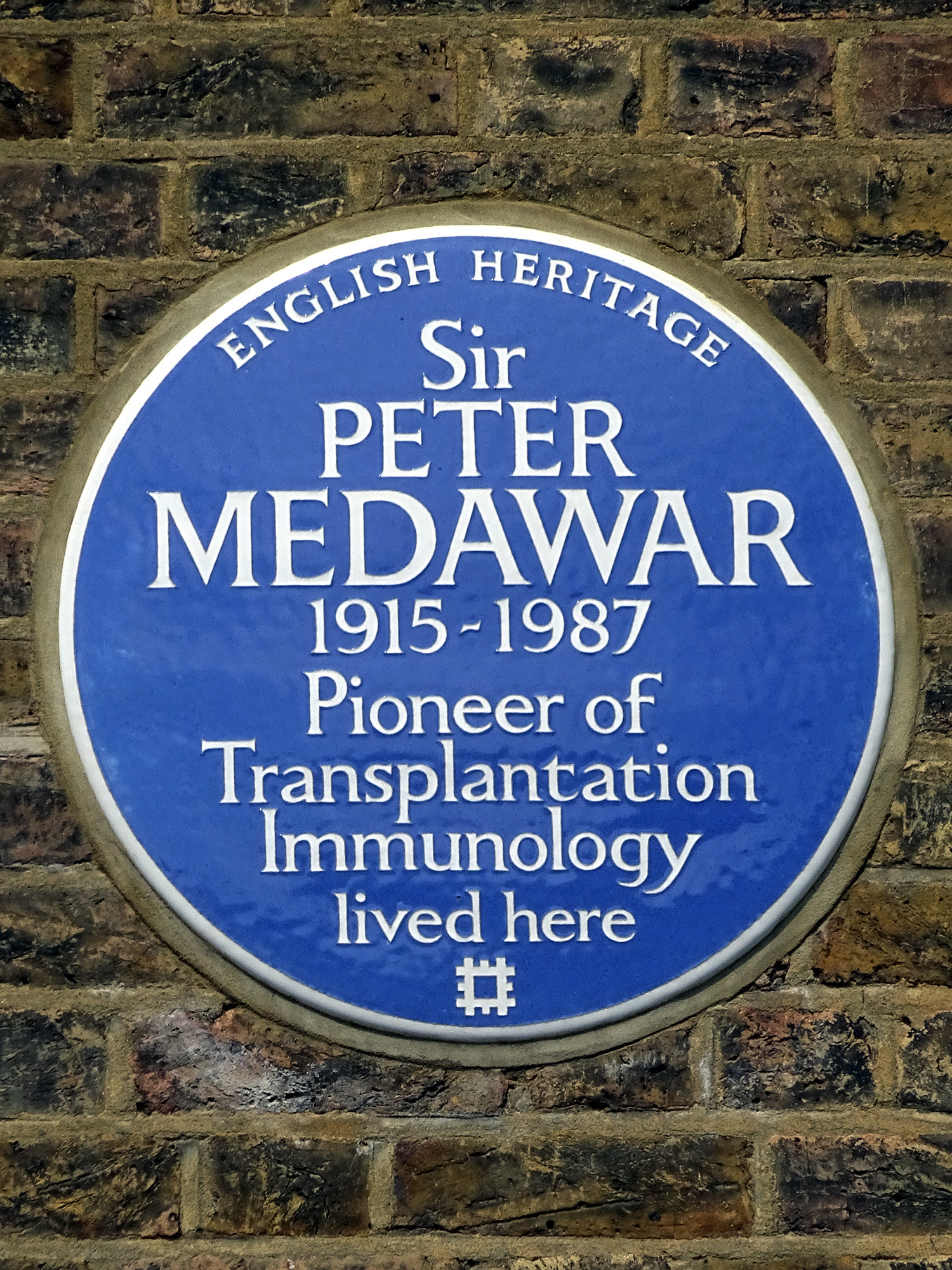
Blue plaque erected on 14 July 2014 by English Heritage at 25 Downshire Hill, Hampstead

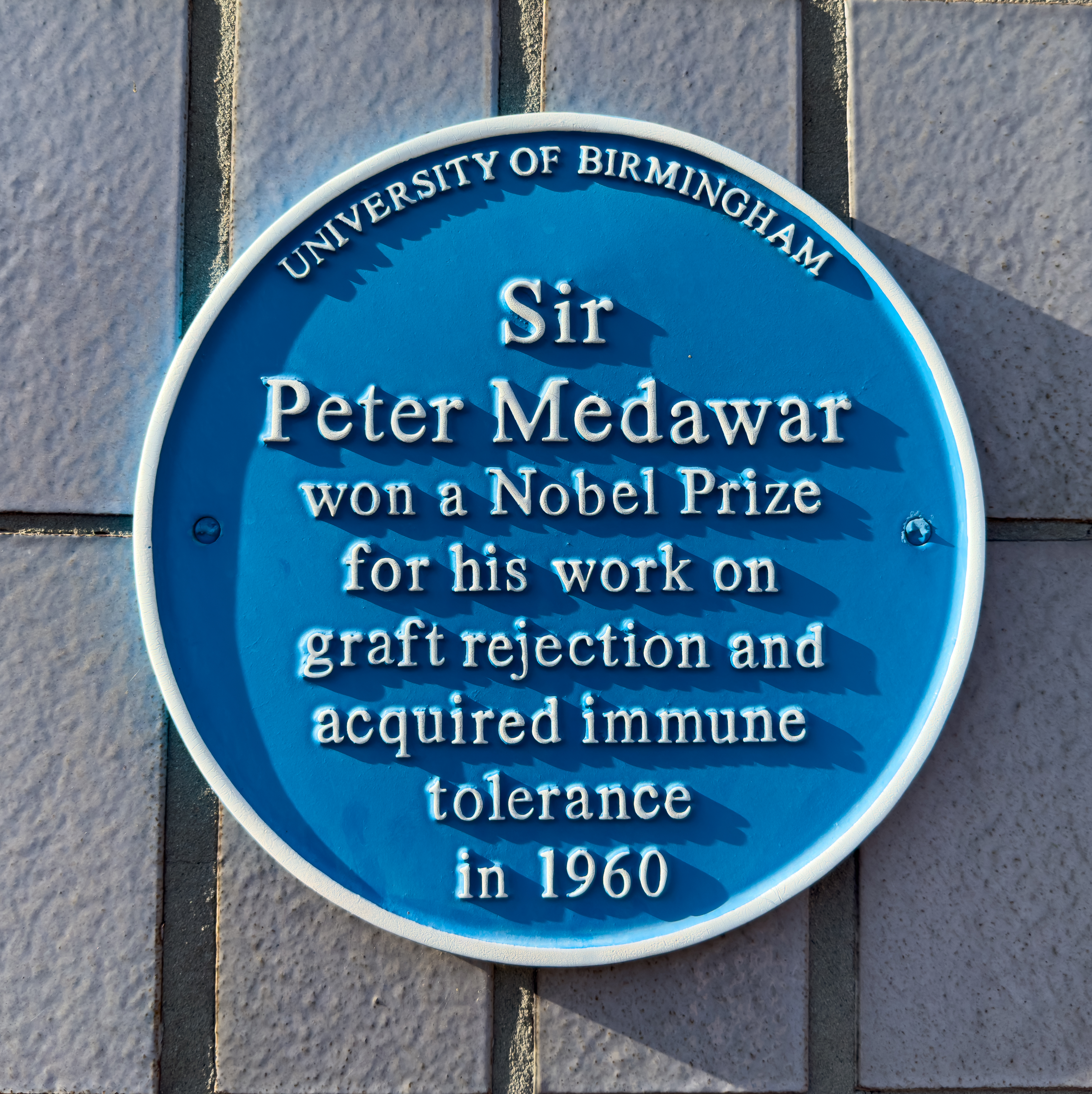
Plaque at the University of Birmingham

Medawar was elected a Fellow of the Royal Society (FRS) in 1949. With Frank Macfarlane Burnet he shared the 1960 Nobel Prize in Physiology or Medicine "for discovery of acquired immunological tolerance". The British government conferred him a CBE in 1958, knighted him in 1965, and appointed him to the Order of the Companions of Honour in 1972, and Order of Merit in 1981. He was elected an EMBO Member in 1964 and received the Royal Medal in 1959, and the Copley Medal in 1969 both from the Royal Society. He was President of the British Association for the Advancement of Science during 1968–1969. He was awarded the UNESCO Kalinga Prize for the Popularization of Science in 1985. He was awarded an Honorary Doctor of Science Degree in 1961 by the University of Birmingham. He was elected a member of the American Society of Immunologists in 1971, and elected foreign member of the American Academy of Arts and Sciences in 1959, the American Philosophical Society in 1961, and the US National Academy of Sciences in 1965.

Medawar was elected President of the Royal Society for the term 1970–1975, but a severe stroke in 1969 prevented him from taking up the office.

Medawar was awarded the 1987 Michael Faraday Prize "for the contribution his books had made in presenting to the public, and to scientists themselves, the intellectual nature and the essential humanity of pursuing science at the highest level and the part it played in our modern culture".

Medawar has three awards named after him:

1. The Royal Society created the Medawar Lecture in 1986 in a subject relating to the history of science, philosophy of science or the social function of science. Since 2007, the lecture has been merged with two older ones honouring John Wilkins and John Desmond Bernal, and became Wilkins-Bernal-Medawar Lecture and the accompanying award, Wilkins-Bernal-Medawar Medal.
2. Medawar Medal, awarded by the British Transplant Society in recognition of significant research in organ transplantation.
3. Peter Brian Medawar Medal, awarded by the State Medical Academy of Rio de Janeiro.

The University of Oxford has established a research consortium named the Peter Medawar Building for Pathogen Research.

The Department of Science and Technology Studies of the University College London has STS Peter Medawar Prize for undergraduate students.

The University of Birmingham Public Engagement with Research (PER) Team established an annual Light of Understanding Award to individuals and groups who accomplished public engagement with research work.

== Publications ==
Medawar was recognised as a brilliant author. Richard Dawkins called him "the wittiest of all scientific writers", and New Scientist magazine's obituary called him "perhaps the best science writer of his generation".

One of his best-known essays is his 1961 criticism of Pierre Teilhard de Chardin's The Phenomenon of Man, of which he said: "Its author can be excused of dishonesty only on the grounds that before deceiving others he has taken great pains to deceive himself".

His books include

- The Uniqueness of the Individual, which includes essays on immunology, graft rejection and acquired immune tolerance. Basic Books, New York, 1957
- The Future of Man: the BBC Reith Lectures 1959, Methuen, London, 1960
- Is the scientific paper a fraud?, The Listener, 12 September 1963 pp. 377-8
- The Art of the Soluble, Methuen & Co., London/ Barnes and Noble, New York, 1967
- Induction and Intuition in Scientific Thought, American Philosophical Society. Philadelphia/Methuen & Co., London, 1969
- The Life Science, Harper & Row, 1978
- Advice to a Young Scientist, Harper & Row, 1979
- Pluto's Republic, incorporating an earlier book The Art of the Soluble, Oxford University Press, 1982
- Aristotle to Zoos (with his wife Jean Shinglewood Taylor), Harvard University Press, 1983
- The Limits of Science, Oxford University Press, 1988
- The Hope of Progress: A Scientist looks at Problems in Philosophy, Literature and Science, Anchor Press / Doubleday, Garden City, 1973
- Memoirs of a Thinking Radish: An Autobiography, Oxford University Press, 1986
- The Threat and the Glory: Reflections on Science and Scientists (ed.: David Pyke), a posthumously collected volume of essays, HarperCollins, 1990

Apart from his books on science and philosophy, he wrote a short feature article on "Some Meistersinger Records" in the issue of The Gramophone for November 1930. The author was a P. B. Medawar. The evidence that this was indeed the future Sir Peter Medawar—then a schoolboy of 15—was discussed in "Gramophone" in 1995 ("'Gramophone', Die Meistersinger and immunology", by John E. Havard, December 1995).
