= Jean Medawar =

British author (1913–2005)

Lady Jean Medawar
- Born: Jean Shinglewood Taylor; 7 February 1913 London, UKGBI
- Died: 3 May 2005 (aged 92) London, United Kingdom
- Education: Somerville College, Oxford (BSc)
- Genre: Scientific literature Biography
- Literary movement: Family planning
- Spouse: Peter Medawar (m. 1937)
- Children: 4
- Relatives: Alex Garland (grandson); Nicholas Garland (ex-son-in-law)

Jean Shinglewood Medawar, Lady Medawar (née Taylor; 7 February 1913 – 3 May 2005) was a British writer and former chairman of the Family Planning Association. Medawar was the wife of Sir Peter Medawar.

== Early life and education ==
Jean Shinglewood Taylor was born on 7 February 1913 in London to Charles Henry Shinglewood Taylor, a physician and Katherine Leslie Taylor (née Paton). Medawar's mother was born in St Louis, Missouri to a British and American family. Medawar was a surviving twin, and the eldest of three daughters.

Medawar attended Benenden School, and was awarded a scholarship to study at Somerville College, Oxford. In 1935, Medawar earned her BSc in zoology.

== Career ==
=== Research ===
Whilst at Oxford Medawar joined the pathology department under Howard Florey where she conducted research on the origin and development of lymphocytes using tissue-culture techniques.

=== Family planning ===
In 1954, she met Margaret Pyke, Chair of the Family Planning Association, and joined the organisation. She became a member of its executive in 1960. In 1959 she became Joint Editor of the journal Family Planning (continued as Family Planning Today) alongside David Pyke, Pyke's son, and remained till 1979. She also worked with the Citizens' Advice Bureau, the National Marriage Guidance Council and also with young offenders at HM Prison Holloway at Hampstead. She was appointed chairman of the FPA in 1966, owing to the death of Margaret Pyke, and held the post till 1970. She co-founded the Margaret Pyke Centre for Study and Training in Family Planning and the Margaret Pyke Memorial Trust in 1968, becoming its Director in 1976 until her death.

== Personal life ==
Jean Medawar met her husband Medawar whilst they were undergraduates at Oxford. Her family did not approve of her marrying him because Peter Medawar was of Lebanese descent and was not financially well-to-do. Her mother asked her, "What will you do if you have black babies?" Her aunt described Medawar as having 'no background, no money', and eventually disinherited her. They were married on 27 February 1937.

The Medawars had two sons, Charles and Alexander, and two daughters, Caroline and Louise. Through her daughter Caroline's marriage to political cartoonist Nicholas Garland, her grandson is director and writer Alex Garland.

In the 1930s, the Medawars joined the Labour Party, which opposed appeasement with Nazi Germany, and "together they did much to help the mainly Jewish German scientists who came to Britain as refugees in the years before the Second World War".

After death, she shared her husband's grave in the graveyard of St Andrew's Church in Alfriston in East Sussex.

== Works ==
- Family Planning. Harmondsworth: Penguin. 1971. ISBN 978-0-140211542. [with David Pyke]
- The Life Science : Current Ideas of Biology. London: Wildwood House. 1977. ISBN 978-0-704502437. [With Peter Brian Medawar]
- Lifeclass. London: H. Hamilton. 1980. ISBN 978-0-241100790.
- Aristotle to Zoos : A Philosophical Dictionary of Biology. London: Weidenfeld and Nicolson. 1984. ISBN 978-0-297782971. [With Peter Brian Medawar]
- A Very Decided Preference: Life with Peter Medawar. Oxford: Oxford University Press. 1990. ISBN 0-19-217779-6.
- Hitler's Gift: The True Story of the Scientists Expelled By the Nazi Regime. London: Piatkus. 2001. ISBN 978-0-74-992239-9. [with David Pyke]
