= The Coma =

Novel by Alex Garland

- First edition (US)
- Author: Alex Garland
- Language: English
- Genre: Fiction novel
- Publisher: Faber & Faber (UK); Riverhead Books (US)
- Publication date: 17 June 2004
- Publication place: United Kingdom
- Media type: Print (hardcover and paperback)
- Pages: 208 pp.
- ISBN: 978-1573222730

The Coma is a 2004 novel by Alex Garland, illustrated by his father, Nicholas Garland. It explores the boundary between the conscious and subconscious mind.

== Plot summary ==
While traveling home on an underground train, Carl defends a young girl from the harassment of a group of men. Carl is violently attacked and falls into a coma. When he awakes, he discovers that his seemingly normal world is very peculiar.

== Critical reception ==
Scott Tobias, writing for The A.V. Club, said, "The Coma lacks the gravity of ideas, which leaves the narrative to drift along in the blinkered consciousness of a pot haze."

Tim Adams, writing for The Guardian, said, "Garland is very good at recreating the virtual worlds of the half-awake and then subtly dissolving them."

Scott Lamb, writing for Salon, said, "The Coma is essentially a story composed of a single arc, and this formal tic may, for some, be its big weakness ... What the book lacks in plot twists, though, it makes up for in atmosphere and tone."

== Adaptations ==
In 2006, The Coma was adapted into a play by Marcus Condron, alongside the theatre group We Could Be Kings. The play made heavy use of projected video content to help express the thoughts of Carl, and original music was composed by Alex Cornish.

== See also ==
- Simulated reality
