= Kihlbom =

Kihlbom is a surname. Notable people with the surname include:

- Staffan Kihlbom (born 1964), Swedish actor
