= Ashley Gordon Lowndes =

British Zoologist and teacher

Ashley Gordon Lowndes (9 October 1885 – 15 March 1956) was a British zoologist and science teacher. He was known for developing a high-speed photomicrography, which was useful for studying cell movements and for which he received a research fellowship from The Leverhulme Trust. He was best remembered as an inspiring teacher whose students became notable scientists including John Zachary Young, Nobel laureate Peter Medawar, and Brian J. Ford.

Richard Dawkins, whose father Clinton John Dawkins was once a student of Lowndes at Marlborough, described him as a "legendary teacher".

== Biography ==
Lowndes was born at Cainscross Villa, Cainscross, Gloucestershire, to Robert Baxter Lowndes, a solicitor, and his wife, Marian, née Whitaker. He had two brothers and two sisters. He attended private school in Cainscross. In 1898, at age thirteen, he joined the Merchant Navy and worked there till 1911. That year, a curate in Portsmouth noticed his academic potentials and encouraged him to work with the curate's father, who was a school headmaster at Ardingley. His academic performance led him to study under John Tennant Saunders, a biologist at the University of Cambridge. He earned an MA in biology. He was later employed in the analytical staff of Nobel Industries as a chemist. Sir Cyril Norwood, then Master of Marlborough College noticed Lowndes and recruited him as the Science Master in 1921.

After seventeen years of service, Lowndes retired in 1938 to volunteer as a biologist to the Church Missionary Society to work at the Leper Settlement at Oji River, Onitsha, Southern Nigeria. After eighteen months, he quit, justifying his reason as:

Well, it is obvious why the natives get leprosy and I told the authorities so, but they wouldn't listen to me. Since we have stopped them eating each other the only protein they get is an occasional snake.

Lowndes resumed teaching science in several schools. He died of pneumonia at Falmouth.

== Achievement and legacy ==
Lowndes published a number of research papers in Nature, Proceedings of the Linnean Society of London, Zoological Journal of the Linnean Society, Annals and Magazine of Natural History and Journal of Natural History. He was largely a self-taught expert in the biology of crustaceans, flagellar movement in protists, and locomotion in fishes. He described several new species including Cyclops lacunae (1926), Cyclops latipes (1927), Herpetocypris palpiger (1932), and Candona wedgwoodii (1932).

Lowndes was awarded research fellowship from the Leverhulme Trust in 1934 for his research on micrography. He was elected Fellow of the Linnean Society of London, and Fellow of the Zoological Society of London, Fellow of the Royal Institute of Chemistry and Fellow of the Geological Society of London. He was also awarded the degree of Doctor of Science (Sc.D.) by the University of Cambridge.

Lowndes was lauded as a "brilliant teacher" at Marlborough. One of his first students, John Zachary Young, known as "the most distinguished invertebrate anatomist of this [20th] century," writing his obituary in Nature commented him as: "It must be more than an accident that so many of them have proved to be successful investigators and teachers."

Sir Peter Medawar, recipient of the 1960 Nobel Prize in Physiology or Medicine and one of his last students at Marlborough, credited Lowndes as the beginning of his career in biology. But he described Lowndes as "a bully", and "barely literate" yet "a very, very good biology teacher".
