= List of fellows of the Royal Society elected in 1949 =

This article lists fellows of the Royal Society elected in 1949.

== Fellows ==
1. John Frank Allen
2. Richard William Bailey
3. Sir Frederick Charles Bawden
4. Francis Brambell
5. Keith Edward Bullen
6. Sir Ernst Boris Chain
7. Ulick Richardson Evans
8. Edward David Hughes
9. William Quarrier Kennedy
10. William Bernard Robinson King
11. Sir Ben Lockspeiser
12. Hedley Marston
13. Sir Kenneth Mather
14. Sir James McFadyen McNeill
15. Sir Peter Medawar
16. Walter Thomas James Morgan
17. Norman Pirie
18. Cecil Frank Powell
19. David Alymer Scott
20. Wilson Smith
21. Sir Gordon Sutherland
22. Sir Graham Sutton
23. Meirion Thomas
24. John Macnaghten Whittaker
25. Sir Frank George Young

== Foreign members ==
1. Norman L. Bowen
2. Percy Williams Bridgman
3. Max von Laue
4. Erwin Schrödinger
