= Caty Maxey =

American production designer and art director

- Born: Virginia
- Occupation(s): Production Designer, Art Director
- Years active: 1986–present

Caty Maxey is an American production designer and art director known for her work in film and television.

== Career ==
Maxey graduated with an MFA in Theatre and Film Design from NYU’s Tisch School of the Arts. She is a member of United Scenic Artists local 829 and the Art Directors Guild local 800.

== Personal life ==
Maxey is married to retired location manager John Panzarella.

== Selected filmography ==
As Production Designer

- 2024 – Civil War
- 2021 – American Dream
- 2017 – Vengeance: A Love Story
- 2013 – Ladies' Man: A Made Movie
- 2011 – Demoted
- 2009 – Spring Breakdown
- 2006 – How to Eat Fried Worms
- 2005 – Sex, Love & Secrets
- 2002-2004 – The Guardian

As Art Director

- 2022 – Pivoting
- 2019 – Mindhunter
- 2018 – City of Lies
- 2018 – Yellowstone
- 2017 – Jean-Claude Van Johnson
- 2016 – Jason Bourne
- 2016 – Independence Day: Resurgence
- 2015 – Ted 2
- 2015 – Jurassic World
- 2002 – The Banger Sisters

== Awards and nominations ==
Year	Result	Award	Category	Work	Ref.
2024	Nominated	British Independent Film Awards	Best Production Design	Civil War	
2024	Nominated	Set Decorators Society of America Awards	Best Achievement in Decor/Design of a Contemporary Feature Film	Civil War	
2024	Nominated	ADG Excellence in Production Design Awards	Excellence in Production Design for a Contemporary Film	Civil War	
2016	Nominated	ADG Excellence in Production Design Awards	Excellence in Production Design for a Fantasy Film	Jurassic World	
