= The Tesseract (novel) =

1998 novel by Alex Garland

- First edition (UK)
- Author: Alex Garland
- Language: English
- Publisher: Viking Press (UK); Riverhead Books (US)
- Publication date: 1998 (UK), 1999 (US)
- Publication place: United Kingdom
- Media type: Print (paperback)
- Pages: 226
- ISBN: 0-670-87016-1
- OCLC: 40360022

The Tesseract is a novel by Alex Garland. It was initially published by Viking Press in 1998.

== Overview ==
The story intertwines the lives of Manila gangsters, mothers and street children. The novel chronicles numerous characters in non-linear storylines and explores themes of love, fate, violence, power, and choices.

== Adaptation ==
The book was adapted into a film, The Tesseract, which changed the setting to Bangkok. It was directed by Oxide Pang and starred Jonathan Rhys Meyers and Saskia Reeves.
