= Rupert E. Billingham =

British-American immunologist (1921–2002)

Rupert Everett Billingham
- Born: 15 October 1921; Warminster, Wiltshire, England
- Died: 16 November 2002 (aged 81); Boston, Massachusetts, U.S.
- Education: University of Oxford
- Awards: Fellow of the Royal Society (1961)
- Scientific career
- Doctoral advisor: Peter Medawar

Rupert Everett Billingham FRS (15 October 1921 – 16 November 2002) was a British biologist who did significant research in the fields of reproductive immunology and organ transplantation. "He made numerous fundamental contributions to our modern knowledge of the mechanisms of graft rejection and how to prevent it, and he analysed some of the mechanisms responsible for the survival of the mammalian foetus in an immunologically hostile environment".

Billingham was born in Warminster, Wiltshire, the son of a dairy farmer. He completed his BSc in zoology at Oriel College, Oxford. His studies were interrupted by World War II, he completed war time service in the Royal Navy serving on an anti-submarine escort. He returned to Oxford in 1946 and became Peter Medawar's research student. During his PhD he worked on skin grafts in guinea pigs, demonstrating that when black skin was grafted onto white skin, the white skin became black. They proposed that the change was due to the dissemination of a self replicating agent from normal melanocytes into non-melanin-producing cells; but this hypothesis was wrong and they later showed that pigment spread was due to cell migration. In 1947 Medawar accepted the chair of zoology at the University of Birmingham. He continued to work on transplantation with Medawar, and in 1951 they both accepted positions at the University College London. Together they demonstrated immune tolerance as proposed by Frank Macfarlane Burnet. Burnet and Medawar received the Nobel Prize for this work in 1960. They also worked on graft-versus-host disease.

In 1951 Billingham married and had 3 children with his wife Jean Billingham. Billingham emigrated to the United States in 1957, and took a position at the Wistar Institute. In 1965 he became chair of the Department of Human Genetics at the University of Pennsylvania. The same year, he was elected a Fellow of the American Academy of Arts and Sciences. He moved to the University of Texas Southwestern Medical Center in 1971. He died in Boston aged 81, following a long illness with Parkinson's disease.
