= The Tesseract (film) =

- Promotional poster for the Sundance Channel.
- Directed by: Oxide Pang
- Screenplay by: Oxide Pang; Patrick Neate
- Based on: The Tesseract by Alex Garland
- Produced by: Takashi Kusube; Naoki Kai Soo-Jun Bae; Jun Hara Koichi Shibuya
- Starring: Jonathan Rhys-Meyers; Saskia Reeves
- Cinematography: Decha Srimantra
- Edited by: Oxide Pang; Piyapan Chooppetch
- Music by: James Iha
- Distributed by: Momentum Pictures
- Release date: 15 May 2003; (Cannes Film Festival)
- Running time: 92 minutes
- Countries: Japan; Thailand; United Kingdom
- Languages: English; Thai

The Tesseract is a 2003 thriller film directed by Oxide Pang and starring Jonathan Rhys-Meyers. It is based on the 1998 novel of the same name by Alex Garland.

The film examines four seemingly unconnected lives brought together through a theft in a Bangkok hotel room (unlike the novel which is set in Manila). The interactions of an English drug dealer, an English psychologist, a Thai assassin, and an abused 13-year-old boy demonstrate that life is so complex that even the smallest events can have enormous, even fatal consequences (i.e. the butterfly effect).

== Plot ==
Sean, a runner for a drug gang, has checked into room 303 at the seedy, rundown Heaven Hotel in Bangkok, to await arrival of a package of heroin. Another guest is Rosa, psychologist who is researching slum children, on the floor below (room 202). In the next room, 203, is Lita, a female assassin who is waiting to intercept the package Sean is waiting for. Tying them all together, is the 13-year-old bellboy, Wit, a streetwise, light-fingered kid.

== Cast ==
- Jonathan Rhys Meyers as Sean
- Saskia Reeves as Rosa
- Alexander Rendell as Wit
- Carlo Nanni as Roy
- Lena Christenchen as Lita
