= The Beach (film) =

2000 film by Danny Boyle

- Theatrical release poster
- Directed by: Danny Boyle
- Screenplay by: John Hodge
- Based on: The Beach by Alex Garland
- Produced by: Andrew Macdonald
- Starring: Leonardo DiCaprio; Tilda Swinton; Virginie Ledoyen; Guillaume Canet; Robert Carlyle
- Cinematography: Darius Khondji
- Edited by: Masahiro Hirakubo
- Music by: Angelo Badalamenti
- Production companies: 20th Century Fox; Figment Films
- Distributed by: 20th Century Fox
- Release date: 11 February 2000
- Running time: 119 minutes
- Countries: United Kingdom; United States
- Language: English
- Budget: $50 million
- Box office: $144.1 million

The Beach is a 2000 adventure drama film directed by Danny Boyle, from a screenplay by John Hodge, based on the 1996 novel by Alex Garland. A British–American co-production, the film stars Leonardo DiCaprio, Tilda Swinton, Virginie Ledoyen, Guillaume Canet, and Robert Carlyle. The plot centers on a young American backpacker and a French couple who discover a colony of people living on an uninhabited island and contend with the local dangers there. It was filmed on the Thai island of Ko Phi Phi Le.

The film was released on 11 February 2000 by 20th Century Fox. It was a box-office success, grossing $144.1 million against a $50 million budget, but received mixed reviews from critics, who praised the film's scenery, soundtrack and DiCaprio's performance, but criticised it as a muddled adaptation that loses the book's themes and social commentary.

== Plot ==
Richard, a young American backpacker seeking adventure in Bangkok, stays in a drab travellers' hotel on Khao San Road where he meets a young French couple, Françoise and Étienne, and he immediately becomes attracted to Françoise. He also meets the mentally unstable Scottish traveller Daffy, who tells him of a pristine, uninhabited island in the Gulf of Thailand with a beautiful hidden beach. Daffy explains that he settled there in secret several years earlier, but difficulties arose and he left. The next day, Richard finds out that Daffy died by suicide and left him a map to the island. Richard persuades Françoise and Étienne to accompany him to the island, and the three travel to Ko Samui. Richard meets two American surfers, Zeph and Sammie, who have heard rumours of the island, and he gives them a copy of the map.

En route to the island, Richard's infatuation with Françoise grows. After swimming to the island from a neighbouring one, they find a cannabis plantation guarded by armed Thai farmers. Avoiding detection, they make their way across the island, jumping off a large waterfall and meeting Keaty, who brings them to a community of travellers living on the island in secret. Sal, the community's English leader, explains that the farmers allow them to stay so long as they keep to themselves and do not allow any more travellers to come to the island. Richard lies about not having shown the map to anyone else, and the trio becomes integrated into the community.

One night, Françoise invites Richard to the beach, where she tells him she is falling in love with him, and they start an affair. Although they hoped to keep it secret, the community finds out and, while he is angry, Étienne says he will not stand in their way if Françoise is happier with Richard.

Sal selects Richard to accompany her on a supply run to Ko Pha Ngan. They encounter the American surfers who are preparing to search for the island and mention Richard's map. Sal is upset but believes Richard when he says they have no copy of the map. To ensure Sal's confidentiality, Richard has sex with her at her order. On their return to the island, Richard lies to Françoise about having sex with Sal.

One day, three of the community fishermen are attacked by a shark while spearfishing. One is killed and another, Christo, is severely injured. He pleads for medical attention, but Sal will allow him to leave only if he promises not to disclose the location of the beach. However, now terrified of the water, Christo refuses to be taken to the mainland for medical treatment, but Sal refuses to allow any doctors to be brought to the island to treat him. As Christo's condition worsens, the islanders simply leave him in the jungle to die, but Étienne refuses to abandon him.

When the surfers turn up on the neighbouring island, Sal orders Richard to send them away and destroy their map. Later that night, an angry and heartbroken Françoise confronts Richard after Sal tells everyone she and Richard had sex, causing her to return to Étienne. Isolated from the group, Richard begins to lose his sanity, imagining he is in a video game and conversing with the deceased Daffy. He sets booby traps in the jungle and gets teasingly close to the farmers without being caught.

The surfers reach the island but are discovered and killed by the farmers. Shocked at witnessing their deaths and escaping back to camp, Richard smothers Christo to put him out of his misery and gathers Françoise and Étienne to leave the island.

Richard, Françoise and Étienne are captured by the farmers. The farmers are furious with the community for breaking their deal not to allow any more newcomers. The lead farmer gives Sal a gun loaded with a single bullet and orders her to make a choice: kill Richard and the group will be allowed to stay or they all must leave immediately. Sal pulls the trigger, but the chamber is empty. Shocked by Sal's willingness to commit murder, the other members of the community abandon Sal, leave the island, and go their separate ways.

Sometime later in an internet café, Richard receives an email from Françoise with a nostalgic group photograph of the beach community in happier times.

== Cast ==
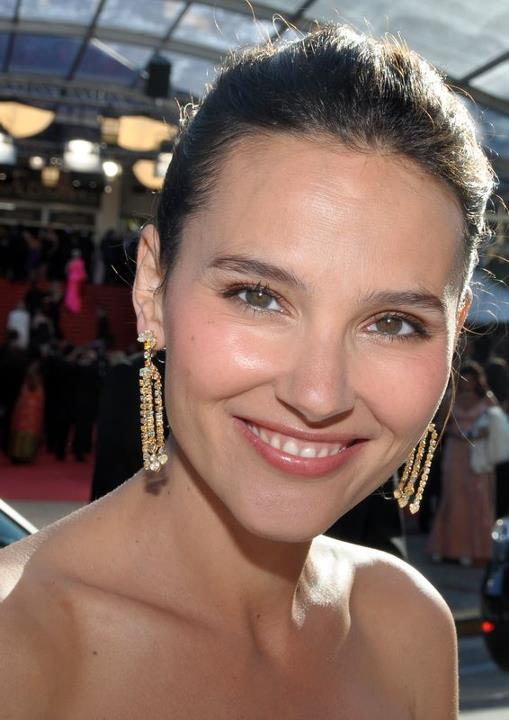
Virginie Ledoyen portrays Françoise in this film.

- Leonardo DiCaprio as Richard, a freelance traveller.
- Tilda Swinton as Sal, the leader of the beach community.
- Virginie Ledoyen as Françoise, the girlfriend of Étienne and Richard's love interest.
- Guillaume Canet as Étienne, the boyfriend of Françoise.
- Robert Carlyle as Daffy, an eccentric former member of the beach community.
- Paterson Joseph as Keaty, a member of the beach community who loves cricket.
- Lars Arentz-Hansen as Bugs, Sal's South African boyfriend and the beach community's carpenter.
- Daniel Caltagirone as Unhygienix, the beach community's chef who has an obsession with soap due to having to always prepare the fish for consumption.
- Staffan Kihlbom, Jukka Hiltunen, and Magnus Lindgren as Christo, Karl, and Sten, the beach community's Swedish fishermen.
- Victoria Smurfit as Weathergirl, a member of the beach community whose tightening pelvis has been a sign for rain.
- Zelda Tinska and Lidija Zovkić as Sonja and Mirjana, two beach community members who come from Croatia.
- Samuel Gough as Guitarman, the beach community's residential guitarist who is not a good singer.
- Peter Youngblood Hills and Jerry Swindall as Zeph and Sammy, two Americans whom Richard meets in Ko Samui.
- Saskia Mulder and Simone Huber as Hilda and Eva, two women who accompany Zeph and Sammy to the island.
- Peter Gevisser as Gregorio, an Italian member of the beach community.
- Abhijati 'Meuk' Jusakul as the leader of the cannabis farmers.

== Production ==
=== Development ===
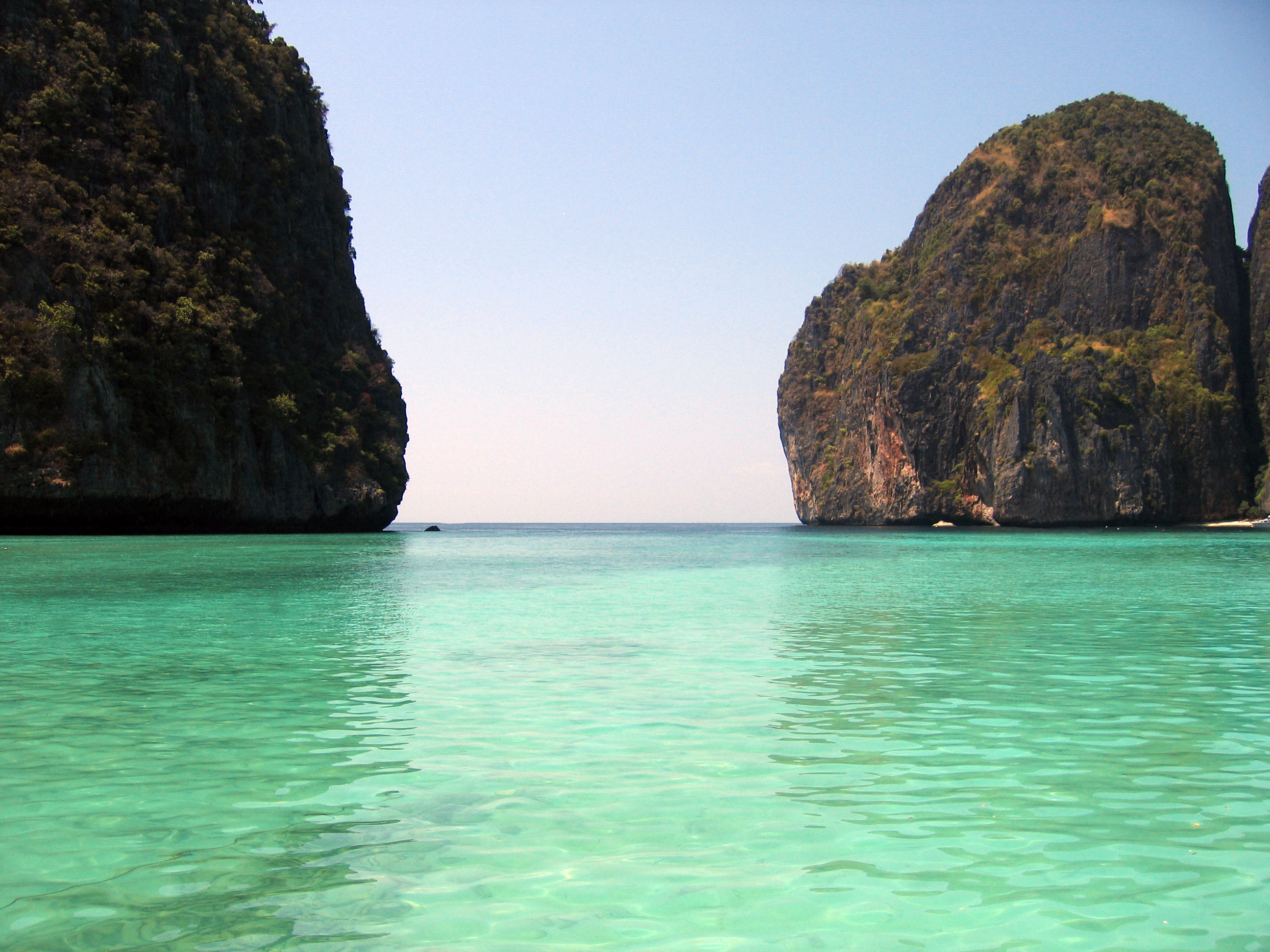
Maya Bay in Ko Phi Phi Le

Alex Garland's novel The Beach was published in 1996 and became a success in the United Kingdom. Director Danny Boyle and producer Andrew Macdonald bought the rights to the book using their salaries from their 1997 film A Life Less Ordinary. In August 1997, Boyle, Macdonald and screenwriter John Hodge went to Thailand, specifically Ko Samui, to scout for locations and get into the mindset of the book.

Ewan McGregor, a frequent collaborator of Boyle's and Macdonald's, believed he would be cast in the lead role, but was ultimately not chosen. The decision contributed to a rift between McGregor and Boyle. It was speculated that Boyle was offered additional funding under the condition that the character of Richard be rewritten to be American and played by a bigger name actor. Whilst promoting T2 Trainspotting on The Graham Norton Show, the dispute between the two was discussed in more depth, with McGregor stating, "It was a mis-handling and a mis-understanding over the film and it's a big regret of mine that it went on for so very long... and it didn't matter about The Beach, it was never about that. It was about our friendship. I felt like Danny's actor and it made me a bit rudderless." Boyle stated, "I handled it very very badly and I have apologised to Ewan for it. I felt a great shame about it and how it was handled."

Leonardo DiCaprio, who was coming off of the massive box-office success of Titanic, had his pick of lead roles in various films, including American Psycho and The Talented Mr. Ripley. Boyle sought DiCaprio for the role, and after months of deliberation, DiCaprio signed on to the film in July 1998. DiCaprio chose the project because he felt the novel's themes about disaffection and discovery spoke to his generation, saying, "We've never had anything to fight for, so we're constantly looking for things to believe in. Richard...is so influenced by the media and television and especially films that he's constantly searching for an emotional event in real time. In a world where everything conforms to our comfort, the only valuable things are those that go beyond anticipation. I think that this is what Richard is looking for, a world beyond anticipation." DiCaprio was paid a $20 million salary.

A major change the film adaptation made to the book is the ending, which in the novel is much darker. Boyle later said he wanted the film to be more critical of its unlikable characters, a "sociocritique of these invaders", but the big-budget studio nature of the film necessitated more sympathetic characters, a romantic subplot, and a more upbeat ending.

=== Filming ===
Filming took place from January to April 1999. Members of the cast and crew were involved in an accident during production when a long-tail boat they were on capsized. It was reported the incident involved both Boyle and DiCaprio. No one was injured.

The beach seen in the film is not the same as in real life. There is a gap between mountains on the actual beach in Thailand. The special effects crew digitally added some of the surrounding mountains during the post-production phase.

The waterfall scene, where DiCaprio and others jump from a high cliff to the water below, was filmed in Khao Yai National Park in central Thailand, at the Haew Suwat Waterfall.

The map in the film was illustrated by Alex Garland, the author of the novel The Beach. He received credit for this as the cartographer. Interior scenes of the fleabag hotel at which Richard stays in the film's beginning were shot at the On On Hotel in Phuket.

In 1999, Hélène de Fougerolles auditioned for the film, but casting directors immediately told her she was not mysterious enough for the character when she arrived with blonde hair in pigtails. She asked them if she could "be an extra or serve coffees there, three months in Thailand, it sounds idyllic!". Although firstly reluctant because the actress was already established in the industry, they finally accepted. As journalists were not allowed to take pictures on set, the only picture the press could have of Guillaume Canet and Virginie Ledoyen before shooting started was their departure at Paris Aéroport with de Fougerolles. The photo made the cover of Studio magazine, from which the international press reported her as officially cast. This eventually ended with her lines edited from the final cut but present in the DVD extras.

== Soundtrack ==
The Beach: Motion Picture Soundtrack

Soundtrack album by various artists
- Released: February 21, 2000
- Genres: Electronica; ambient; rock; Britpop
- Length: 76:53
- Label: Sire
- Producer: Pete Tong

Professional ratings
Review scores
Source	Rating
Allmusic	link

The soundtrack for the film, co-produced by Pete Tong, features the international hits "Pure Shores" by All Saints and "Porcelain" by Moby, as well as tracks by New Order, Blur, Underworld, Orbital, Faithless, Dario G, Sugar Ray and others. Leftfield's contribution to the soundtrack, "Snakeblood", was found to have sampled Orchestral Manoeuvres in the Dark's "Almost" without permission, leading to a lawsuit; band member Neil Barnes said he forgot to remove the sample from the finished track. The songs "Synasthasia" by Junkie XL, "Out of Control" by The Chemical Brothers, "Fiesta Conga" by Movin' Melodies, "Redemption Song" by Bob Marley, "Neon Reprise" by Lunatic Calm and "Smoke Two Joints" by Chris Kay and Michael Kay were also included in the movie but omitted from the soundtrack. The teaser trailer for the film featured "Touched" by VAST, also omitted from the soundtrack.

The film score was composed by Angelo Badalamenti, and a separate album containing selections of his score was released.

During the movie's filming, Liam Howlett from the Prodigy asked writer Alex Garland if he could write the track for the movie with Robert Del Naja. The result was a song called "No Souvenirs", which was not used for the film and went toward the album Always Outnumbered Never Outgunned until the track was discarded around 2003.

=== Track listing ===
No.	Title	Writer(s)	Performer	Length
1.	"Snakeblood"	Neil Barnes, Paul Daley	Leftfield	5:39
2.	"Pure Shores" (from Saints & Sinners, 2000)	William Orbit, Shaznay Lewis	All Saints	4:24
3.	"Porcelain" (from Play, 1999)	Moby	Moby	3:58
4.	"Voices" (from Sunmachine, 1998)	Stephen Spencer, Paul Geoffrey Spencer, Scott Rosser	Dario G featuring Vanessa Quinones	5:19
5.	"8 Ball"	Rick Smith, Karl Hyde, Darren Emerson	Underworld	8:51
6.	"Spinning Away" (originally performed by Brian Eno and John Cale)	Brian Eno, John Cale	Sugar Ray	4:24
7.	"Return of Django" (originally performed by The Upsetters)	Lee "Scratch" Perry	Asian Dub Foundation featuring Harry Beckett and Simon de Souza	4:17
8.	"On Your Own" (Crouch End Broadway mix)	Damon Albarn, Graham Coxon, Alex James, Dave Rowntree	Blur	3:32
9.	"Yé ké yé ké" (Hardfloor edit)	Mory Kante	Mory Kante	3:55
10.	"Woozy"	Sister Bliss, Maxi Jazz, Rollo Armstrong	Faithless	7:53
11.	"Richard, It's Business as Usual"	Barry Adamson	Barry Adamson	4:17
12.	"Brutal"	Bernard Sumner, Peter Hook, Stephen Morris, Gillian Gilbert	New Order	4:49
13.	"Lonely Soul" (from Psyence Fiction, 1998)	Richard Ashcroft, Wil Malone, DJ Shadow	Unkle featuring Richard Ashcroft	8:53
14.	"Beached"	Angelo Badalamenti	Orbital and Angelo Badalamenti	6:45
Total length:				76:53

=== Weekly charts ===
Chart (2000)	Peak position
Hungarian Albums (MAHASZ)	27

=== Year-end charts ===
Chart (2000)	Position
Canadian Albums (Nielsen SoundScan)	145

=== Certifications ===
Region	Certification	Certified units/sales
Australia (ARIA)	Gold	35,000^{^}
New Zealand (RMNZ)	Gold	7,500^{^}
^{^} Shipments figures based on certification alone.

== Release ==
=== Box office ===
The film opened on 11 February 2000 in both the United Kingdom and the United States. The film opened at number 2 at the box office in both countries (behind Scream 3), with a weekend gross of $15,277,921 in the United States and Canada, and a gross of £2,418,321 ($3.9 million) in the United Kingdom and Ireland, behind Toy Story 2.

The following weekend, it opened in seven other countries (Austria, Belgium, Brazil, France, Germany, South Africa and Switzerland) and Puerto Rico, opening at number 1 in those markets (with a gross of $4.9 million in its first five days in France and $2.3 million in its opening four-day weekend in Germany).

Global takings totalled $144.1 million, of which $39 million was from the United States and Canada and $19 million from the United Kingdom. The budget for the film was $50 million.

=== Home media ===
The film has been released on VHS and DVD. It was released on Blu-ray in Spain in October 2022. The standard DVD release includes nine scenes that were deleted from the film, including an alternative opening that, to an extent, resembles the novel. These were included in a "Special Edition" DVD release, with Danny Boyle's commentary on what might have been their purpose. There is also an alternative ending that depicts Sal dying by suicide and everyone loading a boat from the raft.

== Reception ==
=== Critical response ===
On the review aggregator website Rotten Tomatoes, 21% of 122 critics' reviews are positive, with an average rating of 4.5/10. The website's consensus reads: "Critics say The Beach is unfocused and muddled, a shallow adaptation of the novel it is based on. Points go to the gorgeous cinematography, though." On Metacritic, the film has a weighted average score of 43 out of 100, based on 34 critics, indicating "mixed or average" reviews. Audiences polled by CinemaScore gave the film an average grade of "C" on a scale of A+ to F.

Critics suggested DiCaprio's post-Titanic fame might have contributed to the financial success of this film, which came out less than three years after the James Cameron blockbuster. CNN's Paul Clinton said, "Leonardo DiCaprio's main fan base of screaming adolescent girls won't be disappointed with The Beach. The majority of the film displays the titanic-sized young heartthrob sans his shirt in this story about the pseudo-angst and alienation of a young man from the United States escaping civilization and his computer-obsessed generation." He agreed with most others that The Beach was "nothing to write home about".

Roger Ebert of the Chicago Sun-Times said the film missed out on exploring the darker themes of the novel. He wrote, "Watching The Beach is like experiencing a script conference where only sequences are discussed--never the whole film...There are the elements here for a romantic triangle, for a man-against-the-jungle drama, for a microcosm-of-civilization parable or for a cautionary lesson about trying to be innocent in a cruel world...and that's material for satire or insight, I guess, although the movie offers none."

In a positive review, Wesley Morris of the San Francisco Chronicle wrote, "Despite a flat finale and some laughable hypothesizing about pursuits of liberty, the movie has its own addictive elements: well-used electronica, Darius Khondji's photography and the nonstop charisma of its star."

Peter Travers of Rolling Stone praised DiCaprio's performance, writing, "DiCaprio delivers strongly, showing Richard as selfish, manipulative, cowardly and dangerously naive — all of which makes the young man’s hard-won maturity...more affecting."

The film has gained retrospective praise, with critics singling out Boyle's visual flourishes, Khondji's cinematography, and DiCaprio's choice to make an unconventional, commercially risky film at the height of Leo-mania. Writing for The Atlantic, Joe Reid said, "Positioned squarely between the boyishness of his 1990s work and the calcified smugness of his Scorsese-and-beyond adult period, The Beach sits at a fascinating crossroads of youth and respectability for [DiCaprio]. His performance pulls from all corners of his arsenal; it's sexy and brave and wild-eyed and, eventually, exceedingly vulnerable. I can't say whether it was the failure of The Beach that did it, but DiCaprio has never been this adventurous on screen since. And he's certainly never been this risky when it comes to selecting projects."

In 2025, director Danny Boyle admitted his problems with the film, "Everybody [during production] was having parties and there were all sorts of goings on. They were all out in Thailand on per diems and everybody was having a wild time. For me it was just like I was struggling uphill the whole time."

=== Accolades ===
Award	Category	Nominee	Result	Ref.
Berlin International Film Festival	Golden Berlin Bear	Danny Boyle	Nominated	
BRIT Awards	Best Soundtrack		Nominated	
Golden Trailer Awards	Best Voice Over		Nominated	
Razzie Awards	Worst Actor	Leonardo DiCaprio	Nominated	
Teen Choice Awards	Choice Actor	Leonardo DiCaprio	Nominated	
Teen Choice Awards	Choice Drama		Nominated	
Teen Choice Awards	Choice Chemistry	Leonardo DiCaprio, Virginie Ledoyen	Nominated	

== Controversies ==
=== Damage to filming location ===
Controversy arose during the making of the film due to 20th Century Fox's bulldozing and landscaping of the natural beach setting of Ko Phi Phi Le to make it more "paradise-like". The production altered some sand dunes and cleared some coconut trees and grass to widen the beach. Fox set aside a fund to reconstruct and return the beach to its natural state; however, lawsuits were filed by environmentalists who believed the damage to the ecosystem was permanent and restoration attempts had failed. Following shooting of the film, there was a clear flat area at one end of the beach that was created artificially with an odd layout of trees that was never rectified, and the entire area remained damaged from the original state until the tsunami of 2004.

The lawsuits dragged on for years. In 2006, Thailand's Supreme Court upheld an appellate court ruling that the filming had harmed the environment and ordered damage assessments be made. Defendants in the case included 20th Century Fox and some Thai government officials.

The large increase in tourist traffic to the beach as a result of the film resulted in environmental damage to the bay and the nearby coral reefs, prompting Thai authorities to close the beach in 2018.

The restoration period for the bay was lengthened due to travel restrictions during the COVID-19 pandemic. Blacktip sharks began breeding there again. In 2022, the bay reopened to tourists under strict protocols of no boats, no swimming and no more than a one-hour visit per person for a limited number of visitors at a time.

=== Portrayal of Thailand ===
After the film premiered in Thailand in 2000, some Thai politicians were upset by the way Thailand was depicted in the film and called for it to be banned. The depiction of the drug culture was said to give Thailand a bad image and having a statue of Buddha in a bar was cited as "blasphemous".

== Possible spin-off ==
In a 2019 interview with The Independent, Danny Boyle revealed that a television series based on his film has been written by Amy Seimetz. The proposed series is to take place before the events from the 1996 novel, although it will be updated to occur 20 years later, in 2016.

== See also ==
- Phi Phi Islands
