= The Beach (novel) =

1996 novel by Alex Garland

- First edition
- Author: Alex Garland
- Language: English
- Publisher: Viking
- Publication date: 14 October 1996
- Publication place: United Kingdom
- Media type: Print (hardcover and paperback)
- Pages: 439
- ISBN: 0-670-87014-5
- OCLC: 59624863

The Beach is a 1996 novel by English author Alex Garland. Set in Thailand, it is the story of a young backpacker's search for a legendary, idyllic and isolated beach untouched by tourism, and his time there in its small, international community of backpackers.

In 2000, it was adapted into a film directed by Danny Boyle and starring Leonardo DiCaprio, Virginie Ledoyen, Guillaume Canet, Tilda Swinton and Robert Carlyle. In 2003, the novel was listed on the BBC's survey The Big Read.

== Plot summary ==
Richard, an English backpacker, travels to Thailand seeking adventure. After arriving at a hotel in Bangkok, he is given a map to a hidden island beach by a mentally ill Scot going by the alias of Daffy Duck. Daffy tells Richard about the beautiful island with a hidden lagoon and beach, located in the Gulf of Thailand, and shortly after leaving him the map, Daffy commits suicide. Richard is intrigued and, with travelling French couple Étienne and Françoise, sets out to try to find the beach. En route, Richard gives a copy of the map to Sammy and Zeph, two Americans he meets on Koh Samui.

When the three finally reach the hidden beach – bypassing the island's cannabis field on the way – they discover a group of approximately 30 backpackers who have left the outside world to live a slow-paced, largely self-sufficient life of leisure under the de facto leadership of an American woman called Sal and her South African lover Bugs who, along with Daffy, founded the community. Initially suspicious of the newcomers, the group accepts the trio when they explain about Daffy's map and his death back on the mainland.

For several months, Richard finds life on the island idyllic, fishing in the mornings and relaxing the rest of the time. He befriends a few other members of the community including fellow Englishmen Keaty, from London, and Jed, the loner of the group and the island's assigned guardian.

Things start to unravel when an unfortunate food poisoning incident leads to a divide in the group, and some of the islanders on fishing duty are attacked by a shark. One is killed and another injured, who is tended to by Jed, leaving Richard as lone sentry. The remaining fisherman who was attacked suffers mental trauma.

Spending long hours alone in the forest as he hikes between lookout spots, Richard begins to experience hallucinations in which Daffy appears. Richard comes to understand why Daffy killed himself, and why Daffy gave him the map and spread rumours about the beach.

Zeph, Sammy and some German backpackers make their way to the island via a makeshift raft; however, they are discovered and killed by the cannabis farmers.

When Sal obliquely asks Richard to kill the seemingly insane surviving fisherman because of the threat he poses to the group's now-fragile social integrity, Richard convinces Étienne, Françoise, Jed and a paranoid Keaty to leave the beach for good. This plan is disrupted when the armed cannabis farmers arrive, beating up Richard for copying the map and leaving the backpackers' bloodied corpses as a warning. The islanders turn on Richard, who is saved by Françoise, Étienne, Keaty, and Jed armed with fishing spears, and they successfully make their planned escape on the raft.

In the epilogue, it is revealed that the five friends got away and split up when they reached the mainland. Richard still maintains contact with Keaty and Jed. Richard wonders whether anyone else got off the island, and finishes by saying he is content with his life, although he carries a lot of scars.

== Influences ==
Garland wrote the book while living in the Philippines and, in particular, was inspired by similar geography on the island of Palawan.

== Reception ==
Novelist Nick Hornby referred to The Beach as "a Lord of the Flies for Generation X", and the Sunday Oregonian called it "Generation X's first great novel". The Washington Post wrote that it is "a furiously intelligent first novel" and "a book that moves with the kind of speed and grace many older writers can only day-dream about." Publishers Weekly wrote that "Garland is a good storyteller, though, and Richard's nicotine-fueled narrative of how the denizens of the beach see their community shatter and break into factions is taut with suspense, even if the bloody conclusion offers few surprises".

== Film adaptation ==
The Beach was adapted as a film released in 2000, directed by Danny Boyle, and starring Leonardo DiCaprio, Tilda Swinton, Robert Carlyle, Virginie Ledoyen, and Guillaume Canet.

== Censorship ==
In December 2025, the Government of Belarus added the book to the list of printed publications which could harm the national interests of Belarus.

== See also ==
- Tourism in literature
