= Civil War (film) =

2024 film by Alex Garland

- Theatrical release poster
- Directed by: Alex Garland
- Written by: Alex Garland
- Produced by: Andrew Macdonald; Allon Reich; Gregory Goodman
- Starring: Kirsten Dunst; Wagner Moura; Cailee Spaeny; Stephen McKinley Henderson; Sonoya Mizuno; Nick Offerman
- Cinematography: Rob Hardy
- Edited by: Jake Roberts
- Music by: Ben Salisbury; Geoff Barrow
- Production company: DNA Films
- Distributed by: A24 (United States); Entertainment Film Distributors (United Kingdom)
- Release dates: March 14, 2024 (SXSW); April 12, 2024 (US & UK)
- Running time: 109 minutes
- Countries: United Kingdom; United States
- Language: English
- Budget: $50 million
- Box office: $127 million

Civil War is a 2024 dystopian war-thriller film written and directed by Alex Garland, and starring Kirsten Dunst, Wagner Moura, Cailee Spaeny, Stephen McKinley Henderson, Sonoya Mizuno, and Nick Offerman. Set during a second American civil war fought between a despotic federal government and secessionist movements, the plot follows a group of war journalists traveling from New York City to Washington, D.C., to interview the president of the United States before rebels take the capital city. Principal photography began in Atlanta, Georgia, in 2022, with production moving to London later in the year.

Civil War premiered at South by Southwest on March 14, 2024, and was released in the United States by A24 and in the United Kingdom by Entertainment Film Distributors on April 12, 2024. With a budget of $50 million, Civil War was A24's most expensive film at the time. The film grossed $127 million, and received generally positive reviews from critics.

== Plot ==
The United States is engulfed in civil war between an authoritarian federal government led by a third-term president, and three secessionist movements. The president claims victory by the federal government is imminent, but Washington, D.C., will soon be under threat of attack by the joint California and Texas secessionist Western Forces.

After surviving a suicide bombing in New York City, jaded veteran war photographer Lee Smith and journalist colleague Joel from Reuters share their plan to interview the isolated president with their mentor, Sammy, a reporter from The New York Times. Unable to dissuade them, Sammy accompanies them as they set off for the front line at Charlottesville, Virginia. They are joined by Jessie Collin, an aspiring photojournalist Lee encountered at the bombing.

The group stops at a gas station protected by armed men. Jessie encounters some of the men torturing two alleged looters in a carwash but is too scared to take photos. One of them follows Jessie, and Lee defuses the situation by taking a photo of the man posing with his victims. The group continues on and documents a downed helicopter in front of a JCPenney and Hawaiian-shirted soldiers assaulting a federal building. Lee recognizes Jessie's potential and mentors her as she photographs the fighters executing prisoners.

They rest at a refugee camp and pass through a town where residents live peacefully under armed guard. The group gets caught in a sniper battle amid the remains of a Christmas fair. Joel questions the sniper team about which side they are fighting for, to be told they are simply killing those trying to kill them.

The group is joined by Tony and Bohai, two reporters from Hong Kong they are acquainted with. Bohai and Jessie, driving ahead, are held at gunpoint by an American-ultranationalist paramilitary group which is burying civilians in a mass grave. The others arrive and attempt to negotiate their release, but the militia's leader executes Bohai and Tony for not being native-born white Americans. Sammy rams a truck into the militia men and is mortally wounded by gunfire.

The three survivors arrive at Charlottesville to learn most of the United States Armed Forces have surrendered; however, Washington D.C. is defended by fanatical loyalist soldiers and the Secret Service. The three contemplate Sammy's death; Joel gets drunk, and Lee suggests Sammy would have liked dying doing his job, then deletes a photo she had taken of his corpse.

The trio embed themselves with the Western Forces when they assault D.C. Jessie repeatedly endangers herself to capture photos of the fighting, while Lee succumbs to combat fatigue. The Forces breach the White House's fortified perimeter, and when the presidential limousine flees it is intercepted and its occupants killed. Lee deduces that the limousine was a distraction, and takes the trio inside the White House, followed by five Western soldiers.

Upon entering the Brady Press Briefing Room, unarmed Secret Service agent Joy Butler attempts to negotiate the president's surrender but is executed by the soldiers. Jessie exposes herself to take a photo and Lee is fatally shot by the Secret Service while pushing her to safety. Inside the Oval Office, the last agents are liquidated and the president is found and dragged from under the Resolute Desk. Joel postpones his summary execution by asking for a quote. When he pleads "Don't, don't let them kill me," Joel stands aside. Jessie photographs the president's execution and the soldiers posing with his corpse.

== Cast ==
- Kirsten Dunst as Lee, a war photojournalist from Colorado. She is said to be the youngest member of the Magnum Photos cooperative. Her first name is a reference to World War II photojournalist Lee Miller.
- Wagner Moura as Joel, a Reuters journalist from Florida and Lee's colleague
- Cailee Spaeny as Jessie, an aspiring young photographer from Missouri who accompanies Lee and Joel on their journey
- Stephen McKinley Henderson as Sammy, a veteran journalist for The New York Times and Lee's mentor
- Sonoya Mizuno as Anya, an English TV reporter embedded with the Western Forces' advance on the capital
- Jefferson White as Dave, Anya's cameraman
- Nelson Lee as Tony, a reporter from Hong Kong who is good friends with Lee and Joel
- Karl Glusman as a spotter
- Jin Ha as a sniper
- JoJo T. Gibbs as a WF White House Sergeant
- Juani Feliz as Joy Butler, a Secret Service agent
- James Yaegashi as a “Commercial Corporal”
- Evan Lai as Bohai, a foreign reporter who is a colleague of Tony
- Greg Hill as Pete, a gas station employee
- Edmund Donovan as Eddie, a gas station employee
- Nick Offerman as the president of the United States

Additional cast members include Jared Shaw, Justin Garza, Brian Philpot, and Tywaun Tornes as the Western Forces (WF) soldiers led by the sergeant in storming the White House. Jesse Plemons, Dunst's real-life husband, makes an uncredited appearance as Wyatt, a racist ultranationalist militant leader.

== Production ==
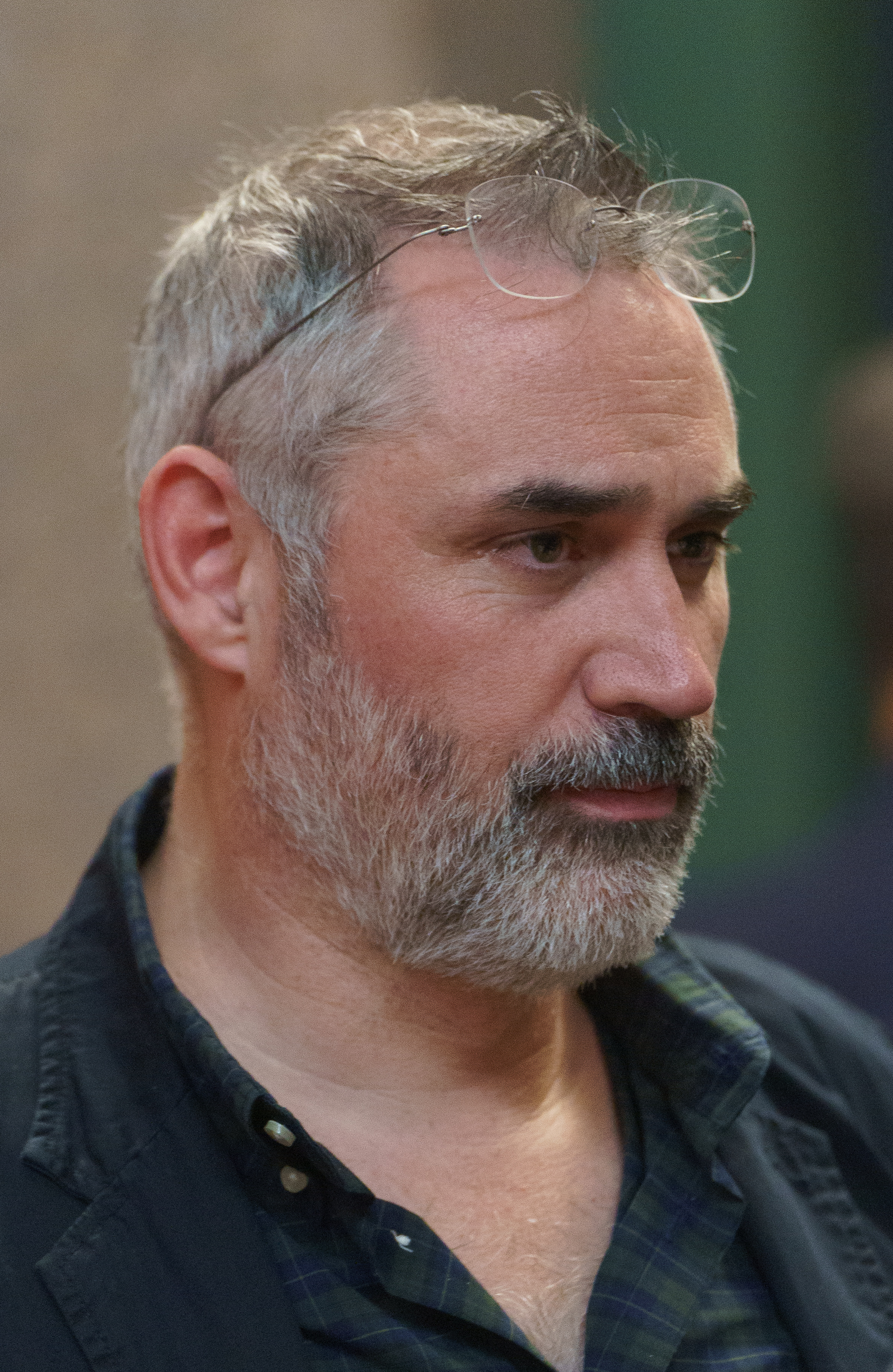
Filmmaker Alex Garland wrote Civil War as an allegory for the political climate in the US.

In January 2022, Deadline reported that Alex Garland had signed on to write and direct the film for A24 with DNA Films co-producing. Kirsten Dunst, Wagner Moura, Stephen McKinley Henderson, and Cailee Spaeny were confirmed to star. In April, Karl Glusman was announced as part of the cast. In a May interview with The Daily Telegraph, Garland described the film as a companion piece to his 2022 film Men, and said it is "set at an indeterminate point in the future—just far enough ahead for me to add a conceit—and serves as a sci-fi allegory for our currently polarized predicament." In the same interview, Sonoya Mizuno was revealed as part of the cast, having appeared in all of Garland's previous films. Jesse Plemons, Dunst's husband, was cast in the uncredited role at Dunst's suggestion after the originally cast actor became unavailable a few days before shooting began. Garland called Plemons' availability "a stunning bit of good luck."

Principal photography began in Atlanta on March 15, 2022, under the code name Road Trip. By May, production had moved to London. The production budget for Civil War was $50 million, making it A24's most expensive film at the time. It was shot partially on the prosumer DJI Ronin 4D camera. The film's Washington D.C.–based finale required months of planning, with Alex Garland and cinematographer Rob Hardy holding a series of roundtable discussions with production designer Caty Maxey, VFX supervisor David Simpson, military supervisor Ray Mendoza and stunt coordinator Jeff Dashnaw. The scenes in the Washington streets were filmed in Stone Mountain, Georgia, while the White House sequences were filmed at the Tyler Perry Studios in Atlanta. In a March 2024 interview with The Guardian, Garland stated his intention to step back from directing after Civil War and focus only on writing.

Film editor Jake Roberts and sound editor Glenn Freemantle re-teamed with Alex Garland, as did VFX supervisor David Simpson with Framestore. Ben Salisbury and Geoff Barrow composed the original score for the film. Silver Apples' "Lovefingers", Suicide's "Rocket USA", De La Soul's "Say No Go", Skid Row's "Sweet Little Sister", Sturgill Simpson's "Breakers Roar", and Suicide's "Dream Baby Dream" were used in the film.

== Release ==
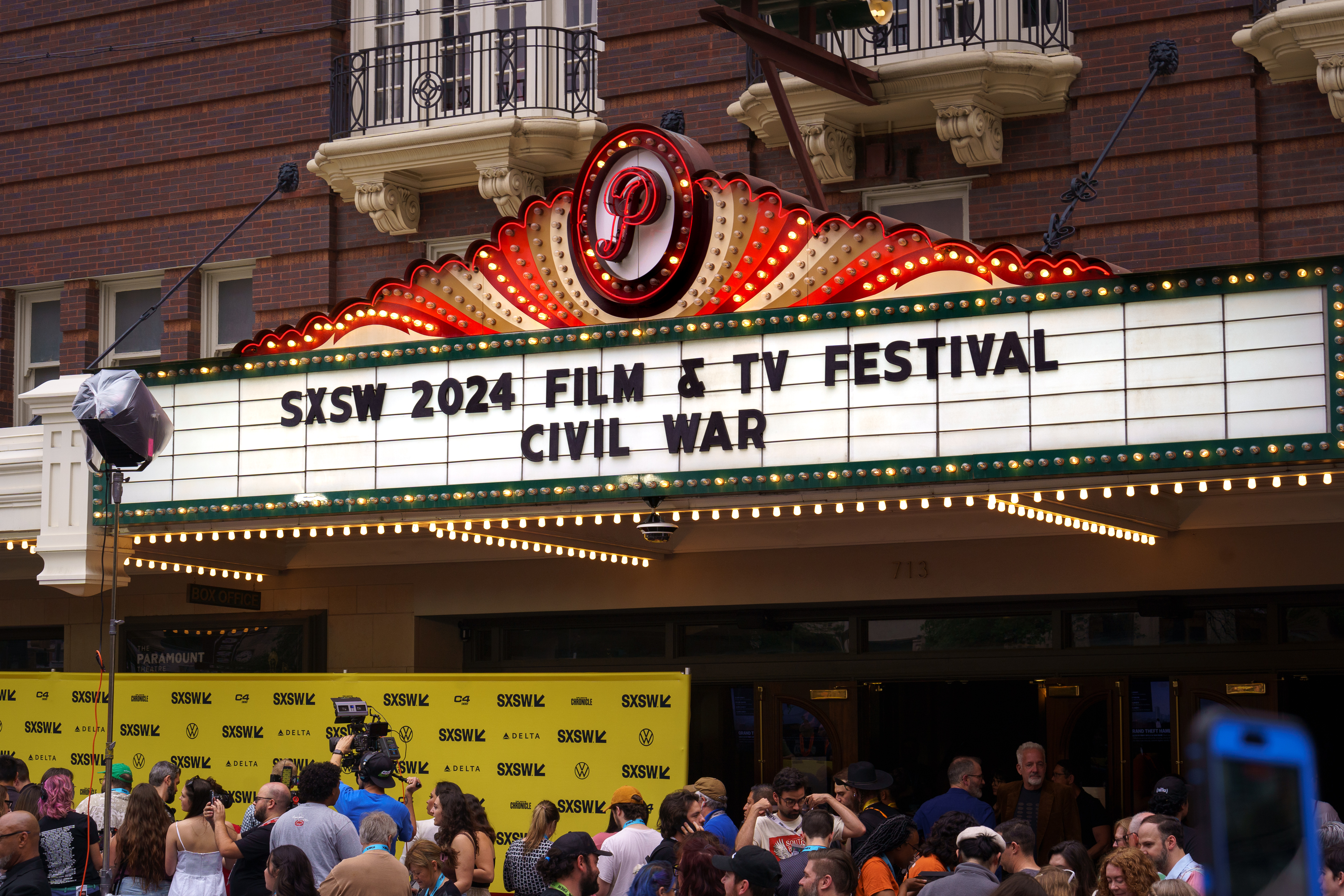
The film's world premiere at South by Southwest

Civil War had its world premiere at South by Southwest on March 14, 2024, with favorable reactions from the audience and positive reviews from critics. The film was previously scheduled to be released on April 26, 2024. It was screened at the BFI IMAX in London on April 11, 2024, and received a wide release on April 12, 2024, in the United States by A24 and in the United Kingdom by Entertainment Film, with engagements in IMAX and Dolby Cinema. The film was released in mainland China on June 7, 2024. It was released through video on demand on May 24, 2024, and Blu-ray, DVD, and Ultra HD Blu-ray on July 9, 2024 by Lionsgate Home Entertainment. It was also invited to Open Cinema at the 29th Busan International Film Festival and would be screened at the outdoor theater in October 2024.

A24 were criticized for using AI-generated images to promote the film.

On April 17, 2024, A24 promoted the film on Instagram by posting five images created by artificial intelligence (AI), each showing a different American city in postapocalyptic disarray. The images were criticized for inaccurately depicting certain cityscapes: the AI-generated image of Chicago wrongfully represented the Marina City apartment complex, with its buildings being separated by a non-existent island on the Chicago River. In real life, the buildings are located directly next to each other. A source connected to the film confirmed to The Hollywood Reporter that they were "AI images inspired by the movie. The entire movie is a big 'what if' and so we wanted to continue that thought on social — powerful imagery of iconic landmarks with that dystopian realism."

== Reception ==
=== Box office ===
Civil War grossed $68.7 million in the United States and Canada and $58.5 million in other territories, for a worldwide total of $127.3 million.

In the United States and Canada, the film was projected to gross $18–24 million from 3,838 theaters (the widest-ever R-rated release by an independent studio) in its opening weekend. The film made $10.8 million on its first day, including $2.9 million from Thursday night previews (a record for an A24 release). It went on to debut to $25.7 million, surpassing Hereditary as the biggest opening weekend in A24's history as well as the studio's first film to top the box office. The opening weekend audience skewed male at 63%, while 57% of attendees were between ages 18–34. IMAX contributed over 16% of the opening weekend gross, with the main reasons given for seeing the film being its subject matter, the action, and a general interest in indie films (each grouping made up a third of the audience, with the former narrowly higher).

In its second weekend the film made $11.1 million (a 56% drop), remaining in first place, before falling to fourth place in its third weekend with $7 million. Variety noted that, despite its U.S.-centric subject matter, Civil War performed well in several markets outside the United States. This includes the United Kingdom, where it grossed $7.9 million as of May 19, and the Netherlands, where it reached ticket sales of $750,000. The film additionally opened in first place at the box office in Brazil, Spain, Belgium, Finland, and Portugal.

=== Critical response ===
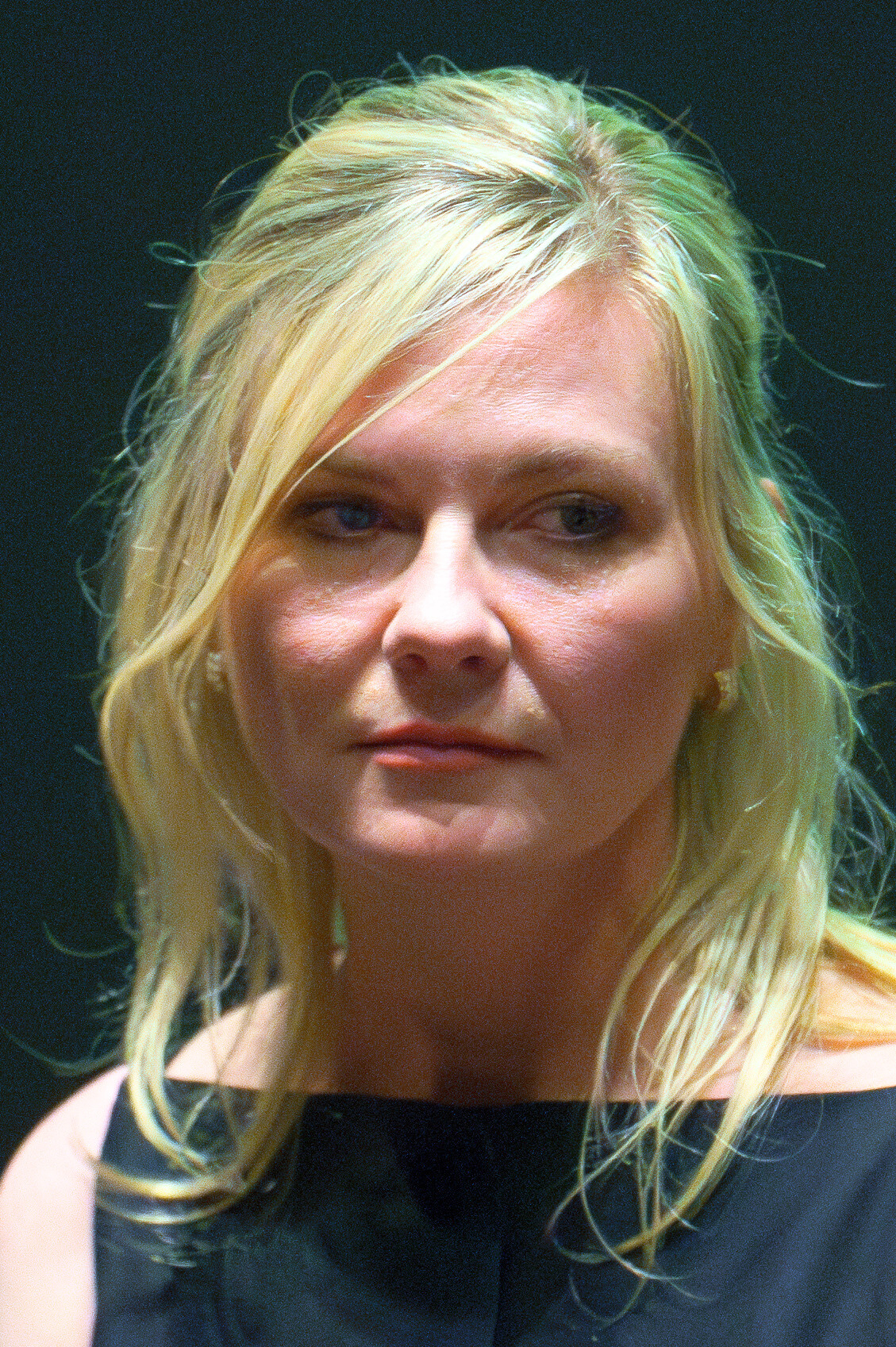
Dunst at the film's world premiere. Her performance was widely praised, even by the film's detractors.

On the review aggregator website Rotten Tomatoes, 81% of 409 critics' reviews are positive. The website's consensus reads: "Tough and unsettling by design, Civil War is a gripping close-up look at the violent uncertainty of life in a nation in crisis." Metacritic, which uses a weighted average, assigned the film a score of 75 out of 100, based on 64 critics, indicating "generally favorable" reviews. Audiences polled by CinemaScore gave the film an average grade of "B-" on an A+ to F scale, while PostTrak reported filmgoers gave it an 76% overall positive score and a 53% "definite recommend".

Following the SXSW premiere, Rotten Tomatoes noted that critics called the film "a gorgeously shot cautionary tale full of big ideas and a fantastic performance by Kirsten Dunst, but it may surprise some viewers." Critics praised the "beauty and intensity of the dystopian drama" while noting its "potential for controversy and disappointment" due to the effectiveness of its messages.

In a positive review, Peter Debruge of Variety wrote: "Garland's the last person to suggest a group hug. As statements go, his powerful vision leaves us shaken, effectively repeating the question that quelled the L.A. riots: Can we all get along?" Matt Zoller Seitz, writing for RogerEbert.com, compared Civil War to films about "Western journalists covering the collapse of foreign countries," such as The Year of Living Dangerously (1982) and Welcome to Sarajevo (1997), ultimately praising the film as "furiously convincing and disturbing." Lovia Gyarkye of The Hollywood Reporter also gave the film a positive review, writing: "With the precision and length of its violent battle sequences, it's clear Civil War operates as a clarion call. Garland wrote the film in 2020 as he watched cogs on America's self-mythologizing exceptionalist machine turn, propelling the nation into a nightmare. With this latest film, he sounds the alarm, wondering less about how a country walks blindly into its own destruction and more about what happens when it does." Manohla Dargis of The New York Times echoed the sentiment, writing: "Rarely have I seen a movie that made me so acutely uncomfortable or watched an actor's face that, like Dunst's, expressed a nation's soul-sickness so vividly that it felt like an X-ray."

Some critics had mixed reactions. The Washington Post's Amy Nicholson described the film as "coldly, deliberately incurious about the combatants and the victims" but also wrote "the film feels poetically, deeply true, even when it's suggesting that humans are more apt to tear one another apart for petty grievances than over a sincere defense of some kind of principles." Valerie Complex of Deadline Hollywood offered negative comments, writing: "The script's utilization of characters of color as conduits for brutality needed to be explored further ... Ultimately, Civil War feels like a missed opportunity. The director's vision of a fractured America, embroiled in conflict, holds the potential for introspection on our current societal divisions. However, the film's execution, hampered by thin characterization, a lackluster narrative and an overreliance on spectacle over substance, left me disengaged."

Johnny Oleksinski of the New York Post observed: "Civil War's shtick is that it's not specifically political. For instance, as the US devolves into enemy groups of secessionist states, Texas and California have banded together to form the Western Forces. That such an alliance could ever occur is about as likely as [a] Sweetgreen/Kentucky Fried Chicken combo restaurant." Eisa Nefertari Ulen, writing for The Hollywood Reporter, also found that the film, despite being "otherwise solid", was partially missing its point, stating: "Casablanca endures because it spoke to a moment as 'crazy and mixed-up' as this one, and nudged the country away from its isolationist inaction. Civil War does not resonate like that classic, because it does not explicitly address this moment. We as a people cannot fix a problem we cannot name."

Stephanie Zacharek of Time observed: "Civil War has the vibe of your standard desolate zombie movie with a modern American backdrop, but it's far less effective than your average George A. Romero project: sometimes a B movie with a sense of humor about itself says more about a nation's despair than an overserious, breast-beating one ... Do we really need a movie to invent, and rub our noses in, the possibility of a bleaker future?" Filmmakers Lena Dunham, Hannah Fidell, William Goldenberg, Matt Johnson, Lance Oppenheim, Daniel Scheinert, Nicholas Stoller, and Nacho Vigalondo all cited Civil War as among their favorite films of 2024, with Goldenberg calling it an "all-too-real look at our possible future." The film received both praise and criticism for its approach to contemporary political themes, including concerns of democratic decline and increased political polarization.

=== Accolades ===
Award	Date of ceremony	Category	Recipient(s)	Result	Ref.
AACTA International Awards	February 7, 2025	Best Actress	Kirsten Dunst	Nominated	
American Cinema Editors Awards	January 18, 2025	Best Edited Feature Film – Dramatic	Jake Roberts	Nominated	
Artios Awards	February 12, 2025	Outstanding Achievement in Casting – Big Budget Feature (Drama)	Francine Maisler, Amber Wakefield, Meagan Lewis, Rebecca Carfagna	Nominated	
Astra Film Awards	December 8, 2024	Best Action or Science Fiction Feature	Civil War	Nominated	
Astra Midseason Movie Awards	July 3, 2024	Best Picture	Civil War	Nominated	
Astra Midseason Movie Awards	July 3, 2024	Best Director	Alex Garland	Nominated	
Astra Midseason Movie Awards	July 3, 2024	Best Actress	Kirsten Dunst	Nominated	
Astra Midseason Movie Awards	July 3, 2024	Best Supporting Actor	Jesse Plemons	Runner-up	
Astra Midseason Movie Awards	July 3, 2024	Best Supporting Actress	Cailee Spaeny	Nominated	
Astra Midseason Movie Awards	July 3, 2024	Best Screenplay	Alex Garland	Nominated	
British Independent Film Craft Awards	November 26, 2024	Best Cinematography	Rob Hardy	Nominated	
British Independent Film Craft Awards	November 26, 2024	Best Costume Design	Meghan Kasperlik	Nominated	
British Independent Film Craft Awards	November 26, 2024	Best Editing	Jake Roberts	Nominated	
British Independent Film Craft Awards	November 26, 2024	Best Effects	David Simpson	Won	
British Independent Film Craft Awards	November 26, 2024	Best Production Design	Caty Maxey	Nominated	
British Independent Film Craft Awards	November 26, 2024	Best Sound	Glenn Freemantle, Mary H Ellis, and Howard Bargroff	Won	
Critics' Choice Super Awards	August 7, 2025	Best Action Movie	Civil War	Nominated	
Critics' Choice Super Awards	August 7, 2025	Best Actress in an Action Movie	Kirsten Dunst	Nominated	
Critics' Choice Super Awards	August 7, 2025	Best Actress in an Action Movie	Cailee Spaeny	Nominated	
Golden Trailer Awards	May 30, 2024	Best Action TV Spot	"Mission" (AV Squad)	Nominated	
Golden Trailer Awards	May 30, 2024	Best Independent Trailer	"Home" (AV Squad)	Nominated	
Golden Trailer Awards	May 30, 2024	Best Motion Poster	AV Print	Nominated	
Hollywood Professional Association Awards	November 7, 2024	Outstanding Sound – Theatrical Feature	Glenn Freemantle, Howard Bargroff, Adam Scrivener, Ben Barker, and Gillian Dodders (Formosa Group UK)	Nominated	
Location Managers Guild International Awards	August 24, 2024	Outstanding Locations in a Contemporary Feature Film	Civil War	Nominated	
San Diego Film Critics Society	December 9, 2024	Best Sound Design	Civil War	Runner-up	
Saturn Awards	February 2, 2025	Best Thriller Film	Civil War	Nominated	
Saturn Awards	February 2, 2025	Best Film Editing	Jake Roberts	Nominated	
Set Decorators Society of America	February 2, 2025	Best Achievement in Décor/Design of a Contemporary Feature Film	Lizbeth Ayala, Caty Maxey	Nominated	
St. Louis Film Critics Association	December 15, 2024	Best Scene	"What kind of an American are you?"	Won	
Visual Effects Society Awards	February 11, 2025	Outstanding Supporting Visual Effects in a Photoreal Feature	David Simpson, Michelle Rose, Freddy Salazar, Chris Zeh, J.D. Schwalm	Won	
Visual Effects Society Awards	February 11, 2025	Outstanding Created Environment in a Photoreal Feature	Matthew Chandler, James Harmer, Robert Moore, Adrien Zeppieri (for "Washington D.C.")	Nominated	
Washington D.C. Area Film Critics Association	December 8, 2024	Joe Barber Award for Best Portrayal of Washington, D.C.	Civil War	Won	
Writers Guild of America Awards	February 15, 2025	Best Original Screenplay	Alex Garland	Nominated	
