= Staffan Kihlbom =

Swedish actor

- Born: 23 January 1964 (age 62)
- Years active: 1989–present

Staffan Kihlbom (born 23 January 1964) is a Swedish actor, who appeared in the 2000 film The Beach.
