= British Independent Film Award for Best Production Design =

- Awarded for: Best Production Design
- Country: United Kingdom
- Presented by: BIFA
- First award: 2017
- Currently held by: The Assessment – Jan Houllevigue (2024)
- Website: www.bifa.org.uk

The British Independent Film Award for Best Production Design is an annual award given by the British Independent Film Awards (BIFA) to recognize the best production design in a British independent film. The award was first presented in the 2017 ceremony.

Prior to 2017, production design was included in the category Best Technical Achievement alongside different areas of crafts in film, this category was presented from 2001 to 2016.

== Winners and nominees ==
=== 2010s ===
Year	Film	Recipient(s)
2017 (20th)	The Death of Stalin	Cristina Casali
2017 (20th)	Film Stars Don't Die in Liverpool	Eve Stewart
2017 (20th)	Final Portrait	James Merifield
2017 (20th)	I Am Not a Witch	Nathan Parker
2017 (20th)	Lady Macbeth	Jacqueline Abrahams
2018 (21st)	The Favourite	Fiona Crombie
2018 (21st)	Colette	Michael Carlin
2018 (21st)	Peterloo	Suzie Davies
2018 (21st)	Ray & Liz	Beck Rainford
2018 (21st)	Stan & Ollie	John Paul Kelly
2019 (22nd)	The Personal History of David Copperfield	Cristina Casali
2019 (22nd)	In Fabric	Paki Smith
2019 (22nd)	Judy	Kave Quinn
2019 (22nd)	The Souvenir	Stéphane Collonge
2019 (22nd)	The White Crow	Anne Seibel

=== 2020s ===
Year	Film	Recipient(s)
2020 (23rd)	His House	Jacqueline Abrahams
2020 (23rd)	The Father	Peter Francis
2020 (23rd)	Misbehaviour	Cristina Casali
2020 (23rd)	Saint Maud	Paulina Rzeszowska
2020 (23rd)	Underdogs	Marketa Korinkova and Elo Soode
2021 (24th)	The Souvenir Part II	Stéphane Collonge
2021 (24th)	Belfast	Jim Clay
2021 (24th)	Boiling Point	Aimee Meek
2021 (24th)	Censor	Paulina Rzeszowska
2021 (24th)	The Electrical Life of Louis Wain	Suzie Davies
2022 (25th)	Living	Helen Scott
2022 (25th)	Aftersun	Bailur Turan
2022 (25th)	Flux Gourmet	Fletcher Jarvis
2022 (25th)	Medusa Deluxe	Gary Williamson
2022 (25th)	The Wonder	Grant Montgomery
2023 (26th)	The Kitchen	Nathan Parker
2023 (26th)	All of Us Strangers	Sarah Finlay
2023 (26th)	The End We Start From	Laura Ellis Cricks
2023 (26th)	Rye Lane	Anna Rhodes
2023 (26th)	Scrapper	Elena Muntoni
2024 (27th)	The Assessment	Jan Houllevigue
2024 (27th)	Civil War	Caty Maxey
2024 (27th)	Hoard	Bobbie Cousins
2024 (27th)	Kneecap	Nicola Moroney
2024 (27th)	Love Lies Bleeding	Katie Hickman
