= Ray Mendoza (director) =

American filmmaker

- Born: 1979~1980
- Occupations: film director; military advisor
- Known for: Warfare (film)
- Military career
- Allegiance: United States
- Branch: United States Navy
- Service years: 1997–2014
- Rank: Chief Petty Officer
- Unit: SEAL Team 5
- Conflicts: Iraq War; Battle of Ramadi (2006)
- Awards: Silver Star

Ray Mendoza is an American film director and former Navy SEAL of Yaqui descent. While an active duty Navy SEAL he appeared alongside several other SEALs in the movie Act of Valor. Later he co-wrote and co-directed the 2025 film Warfare, which was based on his own experience during his deployment to Iraq.

Mendoza joined the Navy in 1997 and served 16 years, separating in 2014 as a Chief Petty Officer. He earned a Silver Star for his actions in Ramadi, served with Seal Team 5 and as BUD/s instructor.
