= Nicholas Garland =

British cartoonist

Nicholas Garland OBE
- Born: Nicholas Withycombe Garland; 1 September 1935 (age 91); Hampstead, London, England
- Education: Slade School of Art
- Occupations: Editorial cartoonist, former theatre actor, stage manager and director
- Known for: Illustrations for Private Eye magazine; Creating with Barry Humphries the comic strip character Barry McKenzie; Publication of Drawing the Games
- Notable work: Work at The Spectator newspaper; Political cartoonist at The Daily Telegraph (1966–1986, 1990–2011); Founding journalist at The Independent; Political cartoonist fr newspaper New Statesman; Cartoonist for 2012 Olympic Games
- Children: Alex Garland

Nicholas Withycombe Garland (born 1 September 1935) is a British political cartoonist, known (as Garland) for his numerous newspaper works, particularly for The Daily Telegraph.

== Early life ==
Garland was born in Hampstead, London. His father was a physician and his mother a sculptor. He was the second of six children: he had three brothers and two sisters and two half-sisters. The family emigrated to New Zealand in 1946–7. He attended Rongotai College in Wellington.

== Professional career ==
=== Theatrical and directorial roles ===
On leaving school, Garland joined the New Zealand Players (as a spear carrier and ASM), the only professional theatre company in New Zealand at the time, under the directorship of Richard Campion. In 1954 he returned to London to attend the Slade School of Art. After leaving the Slade, he went back into the theatre and joined Guildford Repertory Theatre Company as a stage manager.

In 1958 he moved to the Royal Court Theatre in Sloane Square, London, where he worked for the next three years. Subsequently he worked as a director, at Cheltenham Repertory Company and elsewhere, including as Assistant Director to Peter Ustinov in London and New York. He directed the first two cabarets at Peter Cook's Establishment Club and spent a year at the BBC working in the Tonight department.

=== Career as cartoonist ===
In 1964, Garland left the theatre to devote himself to a career as a cartoonist. He and Barry Humphries created the Barry McKenzie comic strip in Private Eye.

Garland also worked for The Spectator and other journals. In 1966, he was appointed the first political cartoonist of The Daily Telegraph where he remained until 1986 when he was a founding journalist of The Independent. He rejoined The Daily Telegraph from 1990 until 2011. He was political cartoonist on the New Statesman during the 1970s and worked for The Spectator for many years.

In 2012, he was appointed Cartoonist of the 2012 London Olympics by the Mayor of London, Boris Johnson. He undertook a series of drawings, woodcuts and paintings, published in the book Drawing the Games. His work is represented in the British Museum, the Museum of London, and the Ashmolean Museum.

=== Exhibitions ===
He has exhibited woodcuts at the Fine Art Society in Bond Street, and his publications include: (illustrated) Horatius, by T. B. Macaulay (1977); An Indian Journal (1983); Twenty Years of Cartoons (1984); Travels With My Sketchbook (1987); Not Many Dead (1990); (illustrated )The Coma, by Alex Garland (2004); I Wish… (2007); Mommy, Daddy, Evan, Sage, by Eric McHenry (2011).

== Honours ==
Garland was awarded the OBE in the 1998 New Year Honours.

== Personal life ==
In 1964, Garland married Harriet Crittall, and the marriage was dissolved in 1968. In 1969 he married Caroline Medawar: they had two sons, including Alexander, before the marriage was dissolved in 1994. In 1995 he married Priscilla Roth, with whom he lives in Belsize Park, London.
