= Fully dressed flies =

Elaborate and colorful artificial flies used in fly fishing

- Artificial fly
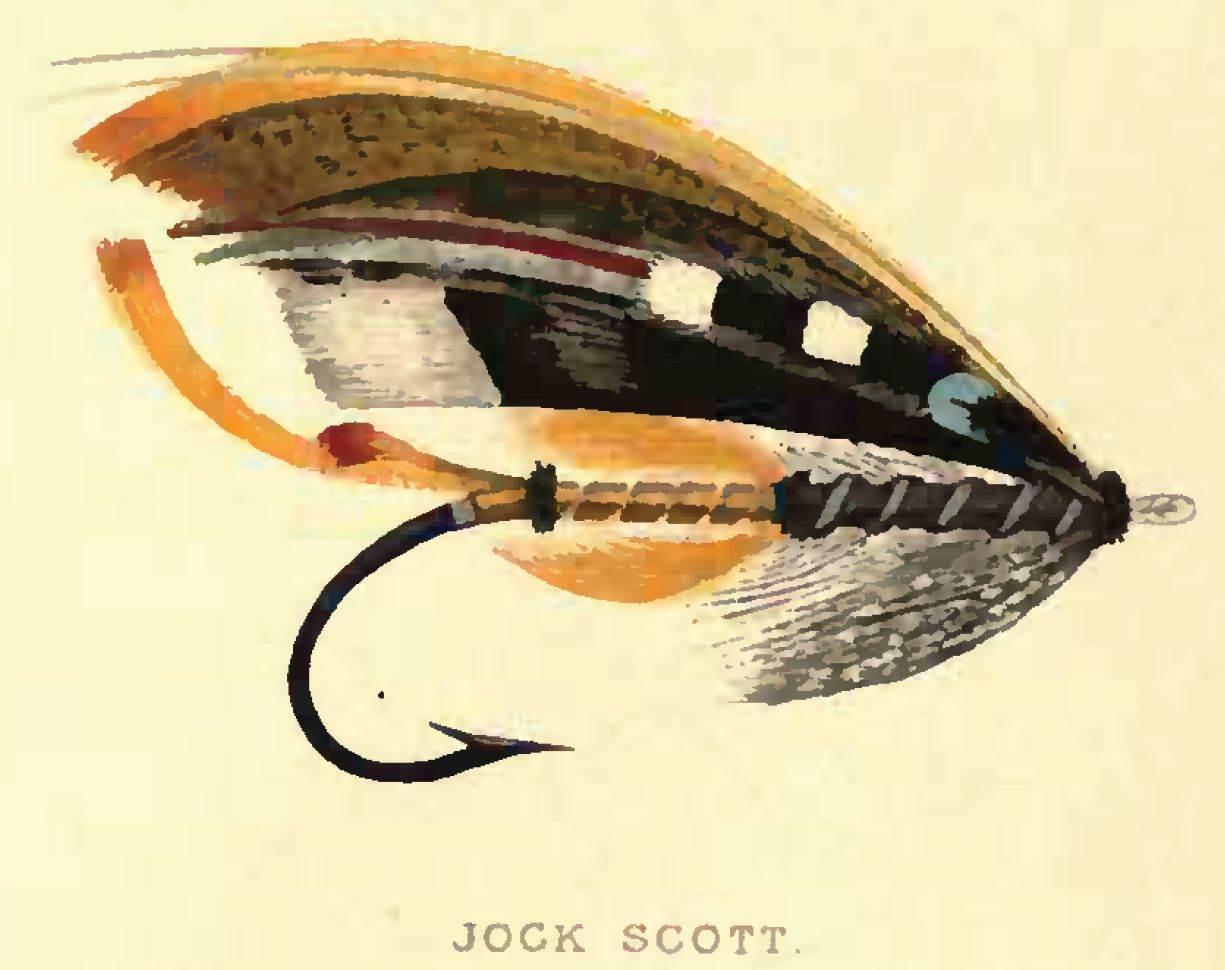
- Jock Scott fly variation
- Type: Salmon fly
- Imitates: imitator

History
- Creator: various
- Created: 1800s
- Variations: many

Materials
- Typical sizes: 1.25 to 3 inches
- Typical hooks: Salmon fly hook
- Thread: black
- Tail: usually feather fibers (i.e. tippets, hackle)
- Body: usually natural or light color dyed from rabbits, seal, and muskrat.
- Wing: the most complicated and intricate part; usually made from feathers and tips of feathers (i.e. turkey, duck, bustard, jay) either separate feathers or married feathers. Usually the color complements the body and presents a theme.
- Ribbing: mostly tinsel, floss, or wire in gold, silver; oval or flat.
- Thorax: tied like a nymph fly's beard that is only on the bottom of the hook and extends to the point (i.e. Guinea, Honey Dun Hackle).
- Legs: none
- Tag: a small portion tied on the bend before the tai; usually floss or tinsel
- Butt: small ball of fur dubbing, herl, or Krystal Flash; tied after the tail and before the body (similar to midsection, shoulder)
- Cheek: small feather tied on each side of the wing just before tying the head, contrasts the wing and body slightly.
- Head: usually thread or fur, tied in at the end behind the eye; usually with thread it is tied to present a smooth "head"; with fur to hide small tips left from the wing (with same purpose as thread head).
- Bead: none

Uses
- Primary use: Salmon

Fully dressed flies are elaborate and colorful artificial flies used in fly fishing. The most famous of these are the classic salmon flies, which are exquisite patterns made from mostly rare and beautiful materials and feathers, including golden pheasants, toucans, swans, and ivory-billed woodpeckers. These flies have been popular in the United Kingdom since the 19th century. Fully dressed flies are often meant for display and are not used in actual fishing. Many patterns are expensive to tie because of the cost of rare feathers.

== Parts ==
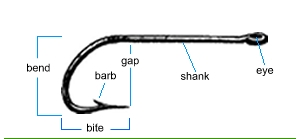
Parts of fishhook

Parts of a fully dressed fly, as listed in Kelson's 1895 book, are shown below.

Parts of a salmon fly in correct proportion	Key to Parts of Salmon Fly Image: A – Tag; C – Tail; D1, D2, D3 – Butt; E – Hackle 95 boo; E2 – Throat Hackle; D1, D2, D3, Butts; E – Upper section hackle; F.- Under wing; G – Over Wing; HH – Horns; J – Sides; K – Cheeks; L – Head

The key to the figure as explained by Kelson with comments in parentheses are listed below.

- A. Gut loop (hook eye)
- B.Tag, Here in two sections, silver twist followed by floss silk, a small portion tied on the bend before the tail (usually floss or tinsel)
- C. C. Tail, of a topping and usually of a crow feathers (usually feather fibers (i.e. feather tippets, hackle)
- D1, D2, D3. Butts Between D1 (tail butts) and D3 (head butts) lies the body divided in this type of fly into two sections by D2 (section butt), each section having 5 ribs of tinsel; D3 is here preceded by (in order of construction) by Toucan feathers above and below. (small ball of fur dubbing, herl, or Krystal Flash; tied after the tail and before the body (similar to midsection, shoulder)
- E. Hackle, here distinguished as "Upper section hackle". When wound over the whole length of the fly it is termed "Body Hackle" (Throat/Beard-fibers tied like a nymph fly's beard that is only on the bottom of the hook and extends to the point (i.e. Guinea, Honey Dun Hackle).
- E2. Throat Hackle, usually written "throat"
- F. Under wing. Here of "White tipped turkey"
- G. Over Wing, in most flies capped with a "topping" (the most complicated and intricate part; usually made from feathers and tips of feathers (i.e. turkey, duck, bustard, jay) either separate feathers or married feathers. Usually the color complements the body and presents a theme.
- HH. Horns
- J. Sides (thin feather sections tied before the cheeks, in an angle similar to the wing angle.)
- K. Cheeks (small feather tied on each side of the wing just before tying the head, contrasts the wing and body slightly)
- L. Head (usually thread or fur, tied in at the end behind the eye; usually with thread it is tied to present a smooth "head"; with fur to hide small tips left from the wing (with same purpose as thread head))
- 1. A line showing the proper length of the tail and wing beyond the hook-bend
- 2. Indicates the place of the first coil of the tag relatively to the hook-barb, the best barb supplying the best guide to the eye in initial operation of tying on the "tag" material.
- 3. Indicates place on the hook-shank (relatively to the hook-point), at which ends of the gut loop should terminate, leaving the gap, for adjustment

== See also ==
- The Salmon Fly by George Kelson

== Gallery ==
Salmon Flies
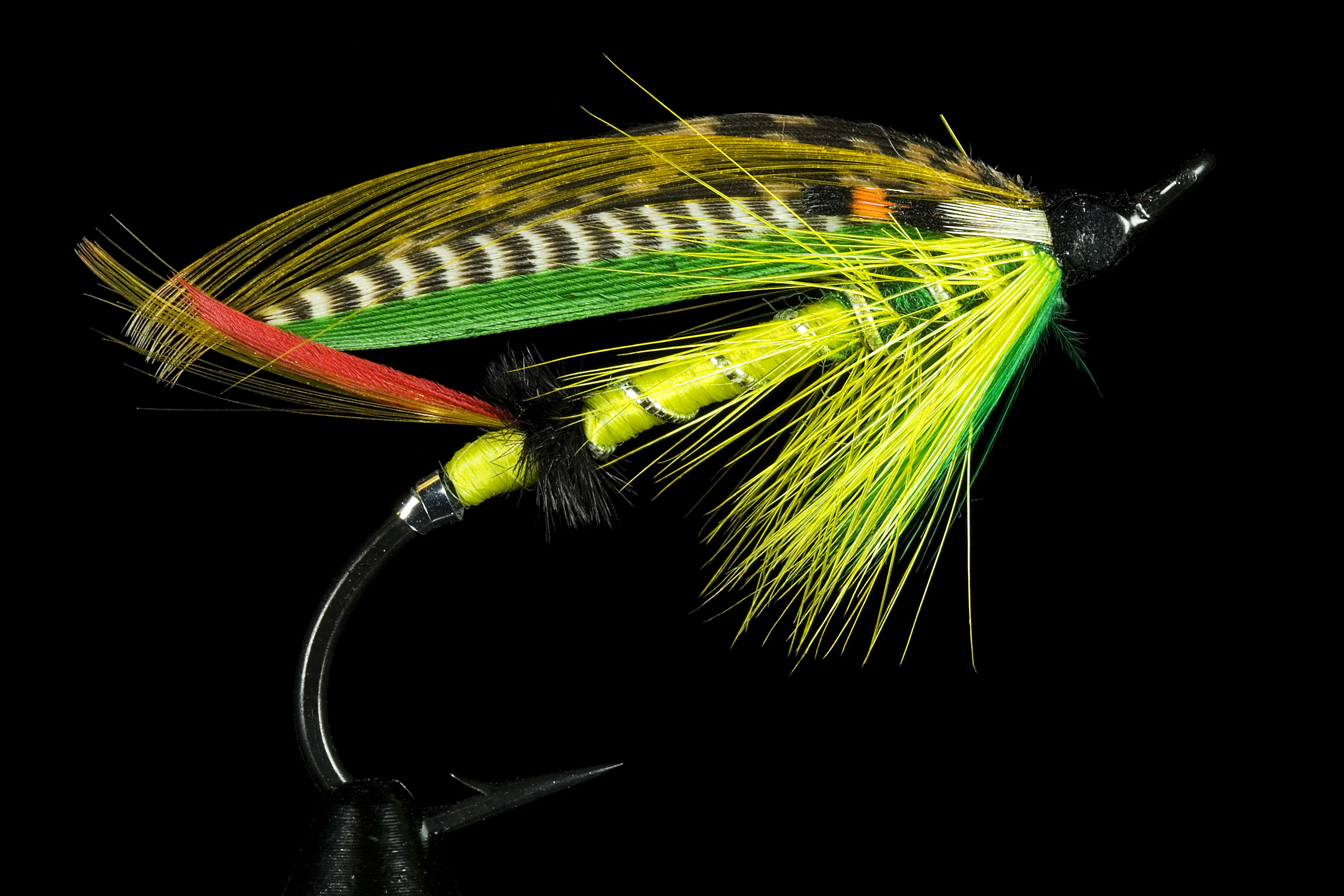
Green Highlander (1914)

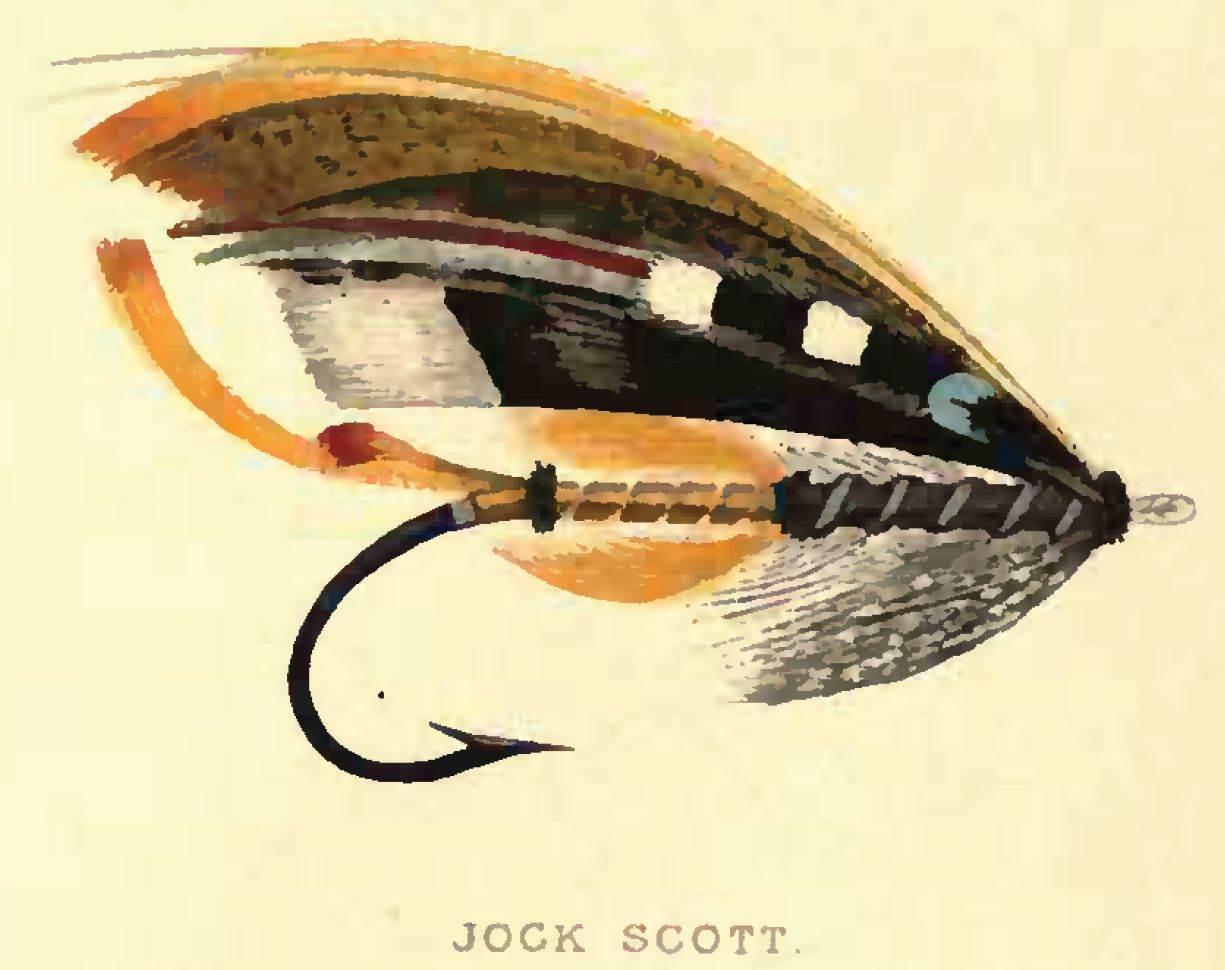
Jock Scott (1850)

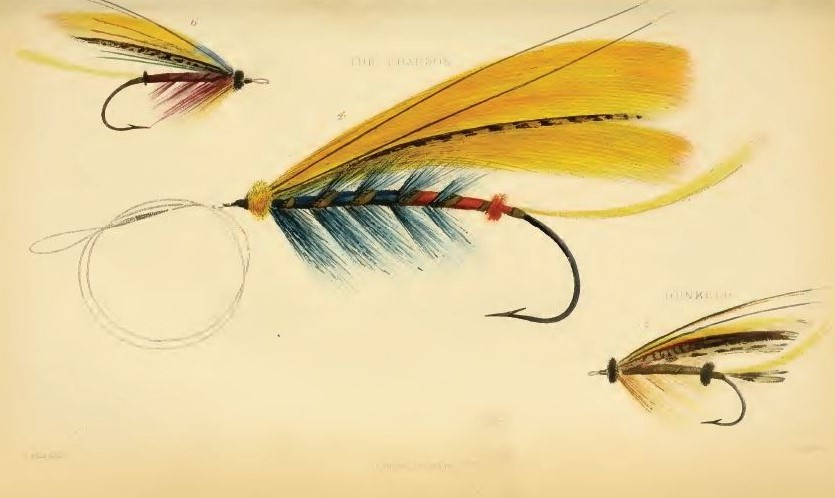
Salmon flies from the Book of Salmon by Edward Fitzgibbon (1850)

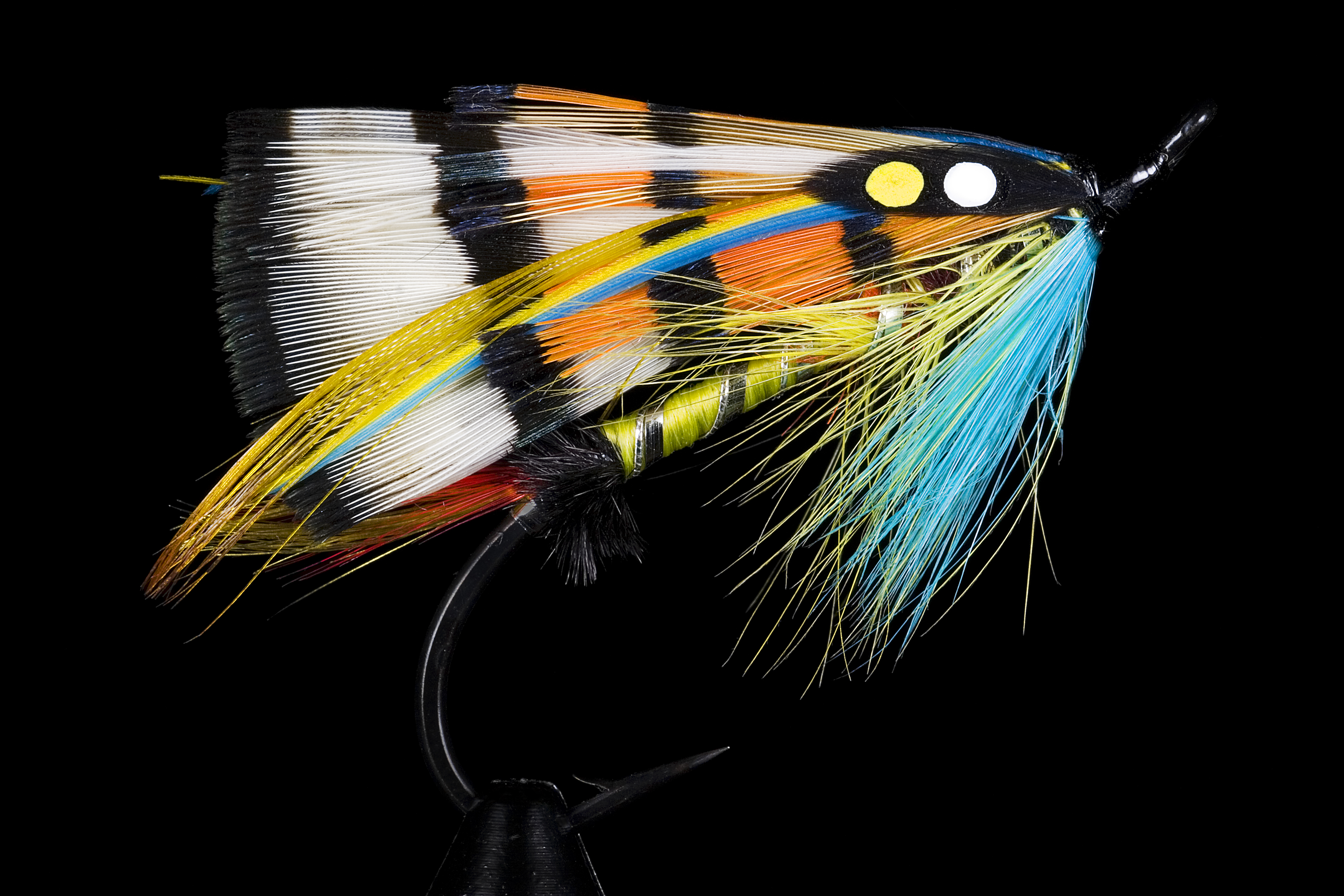
Durham Ranger (mid 19th Century)

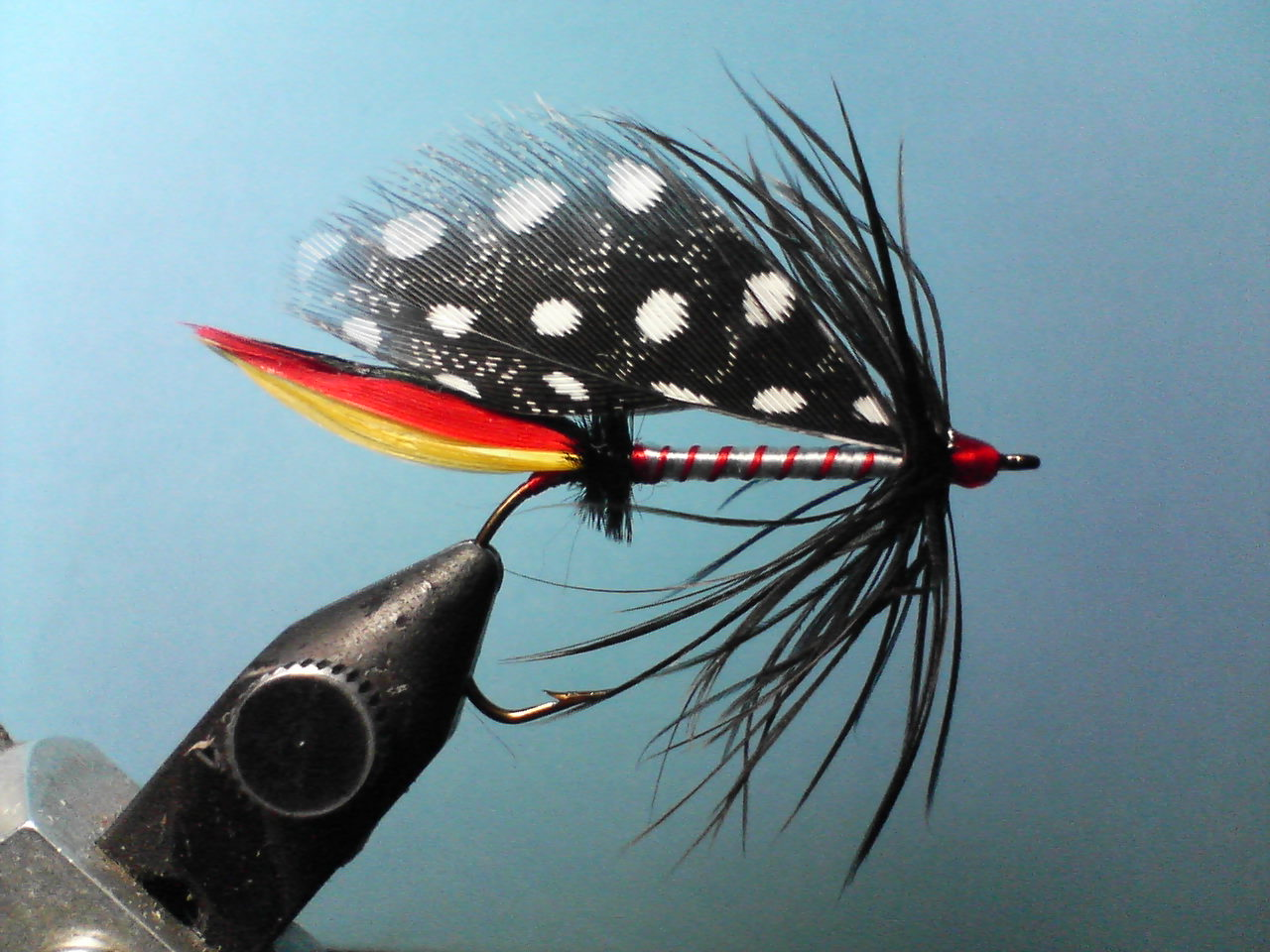
Triumph Bass Fly

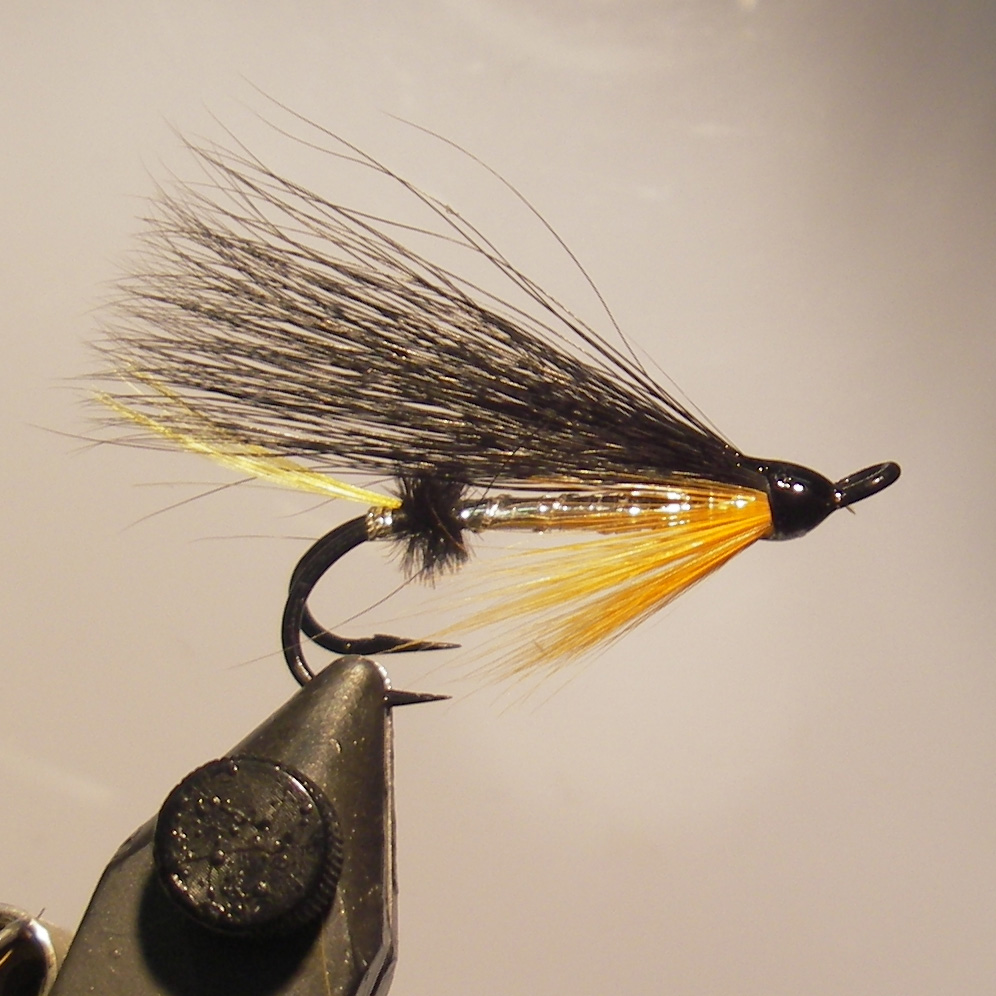
Mosca da salmone

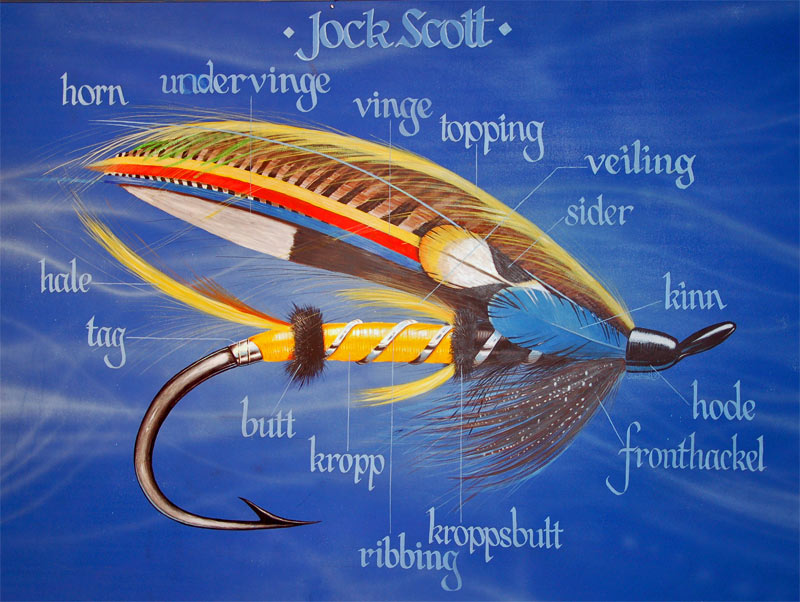
Labeled Jock Scott

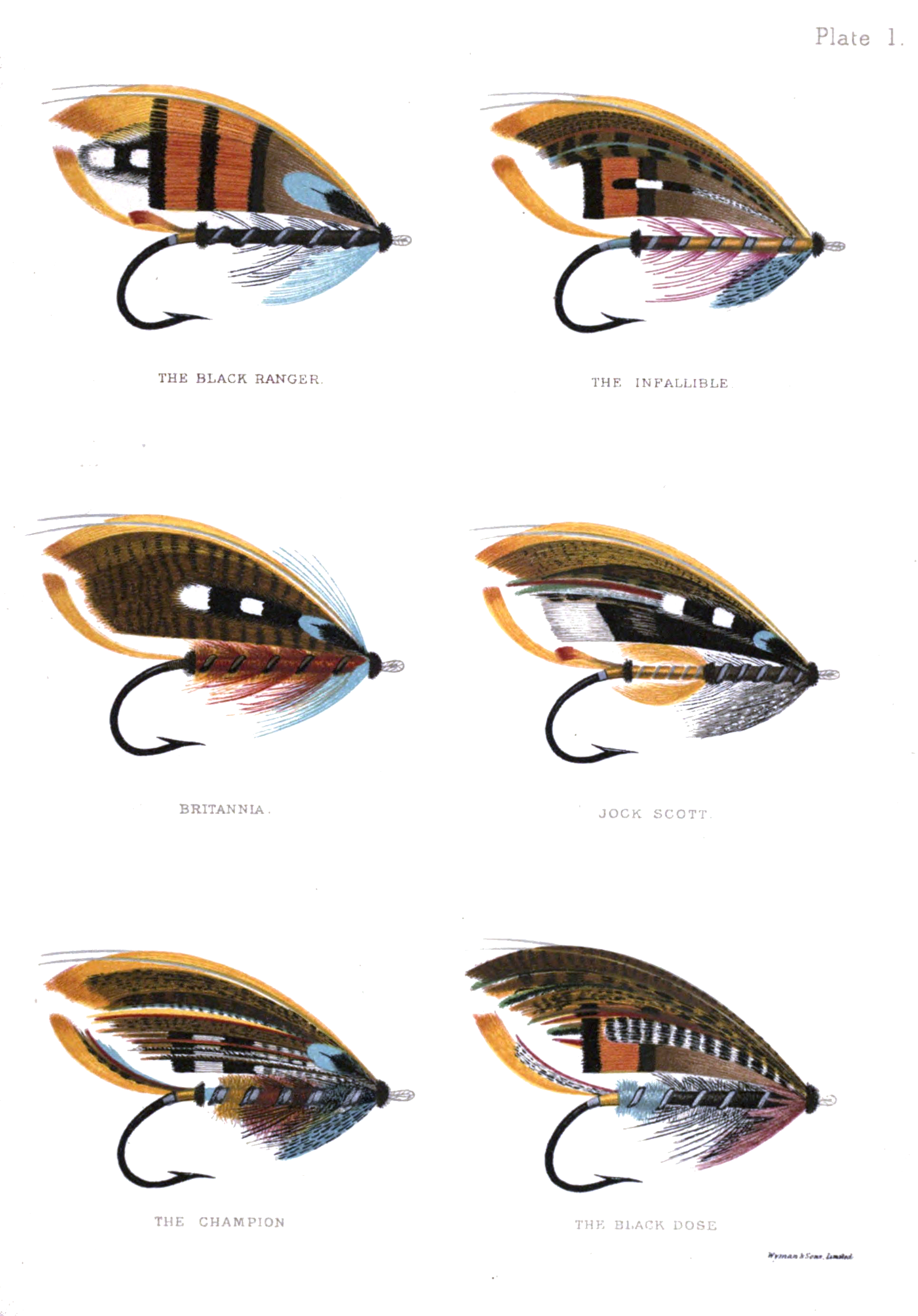
Plate of flies from George M. Kelson's The Salmon Fly (1895)

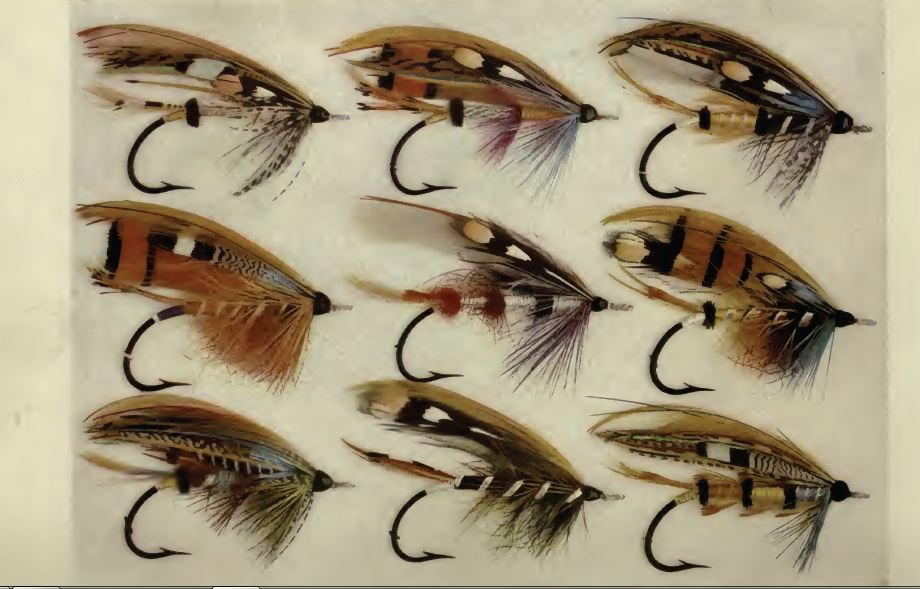
Plate of flies from T. E. Pryce-Tannatt (1914)

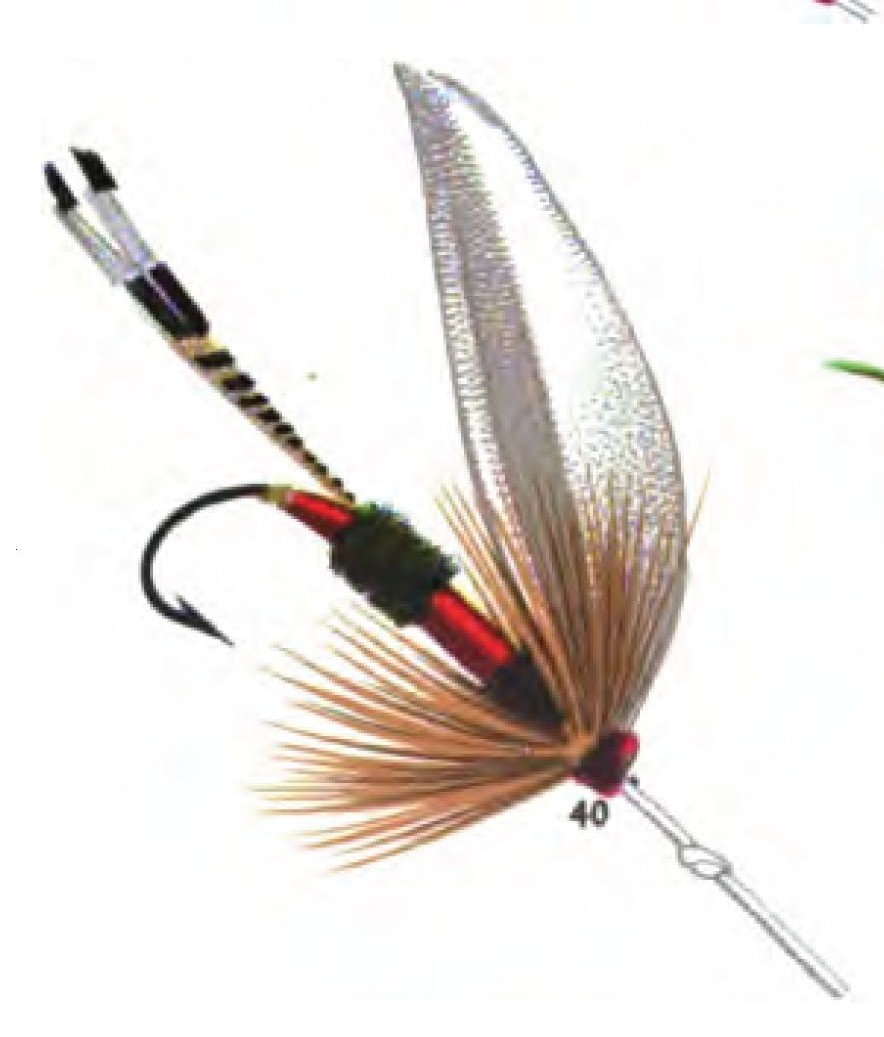
Royal Coachman (1892)<ref name='Orvis'>Marbury, Mary Orvis (1892). Favorite Flies and Their Histories. Boston and New York: Houghton Mifflin and Company. pp. 97.
