= Robert Marston =

Robert Marston may refer to:

- Robert Q. Marston (1923–1999), American physician and university administrator
- Robert Bright Marston (1853–1927), English angling enthusiast, publisher, and writer
