= The Salmon Fly =

1895 fly fishing book by George M. Kelson

The Salmon Fly: How to Dress It and How to Use It
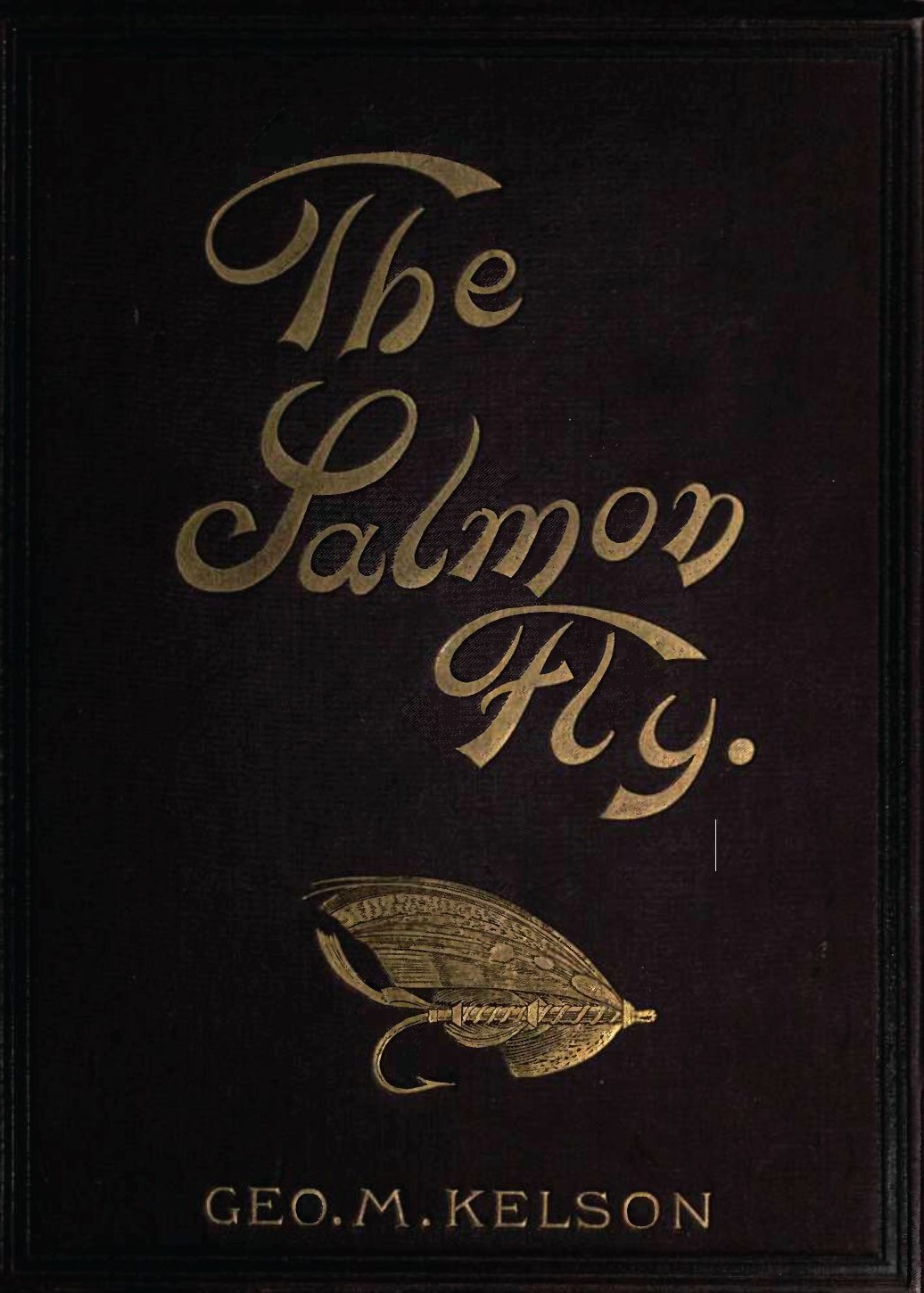
- Author: George M. Kelson
- Language: English
- Subject: Fly fishing
- Publisher: Messers. Wyman & Sons, Limited, London
- Publication date: 1895
- Publication place: Great Britain
- Pages: 510

The Salmon Fly - How to Dress It and How to Use It is a fly fishing book written by George M. Kelson published in London in 1895 by Messers. Wyman & Sons, Limited. This Victorian guide to fly fish tying built up the illusion that angling for salmon required feathers of exotic bird species.

== Synopsis ==
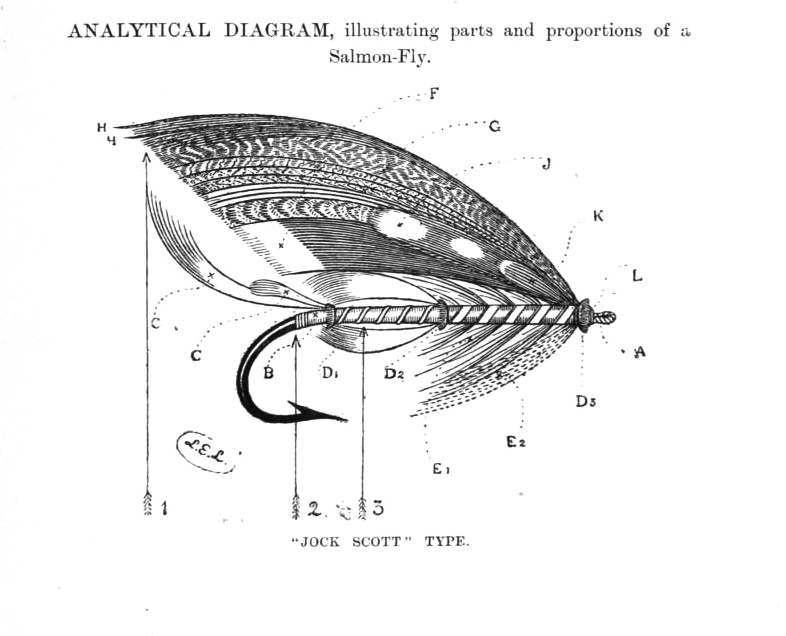
Illustration of parts from the book

In The Salmon Fly, Kelson boldly and confidently distilled a lifetime of salmon fishing wisdom into this privately published work. The book contains 510 pages of text and 46 pages of illustrations plus 8 coloured plates showing 52 flies. Many of the black & white illustrations are of fly-fishing contemporaries of Kelson, including Mr. A.V. Wells-Ridley J.P, Major J.P. Traherne and Mr. Barclay Field. The first part of the book is devoted to the techniques of tying the salmon fly as well as patterns for individual flies. Here's a typical pattern write-up:

- Jock Scott. G.S.- (John Scott.)
  - TAG. Silver twist and yellow silk.
  - TAIL. A topping and Indian Crow.
  - BUTT. Black herl.
  - BODY. In two equal sections : No. 1, of yellow silk (butter-cup colour) ribbed with narrow silver tinsel, and butted with Toucan above and below, and black herl : No. 2, black silk, ribbed with broad silver tinsel.
  - HACKLE. A natural black hackle, from centre.
  - THROAT. Gallina.
  - WINGS. Two strips of black Turkey with white tips, Golden Pheasant tail, Bustard, grey Mallard, Peacock (sword feather) Swan dyed blue and yellow, red Macaw, Mallard, and a topping.
  - SIDES. Jungle.
  - CHEEKS. Chatterer.
  - HORNS. Blue Macaw.
  - HEAD. Black herl.

It is only just possible to find a river or a catch, be it in pools, streams, rapids, or flats, shaded or exposed to the light of day, in which a "Jock Scott," when dressed properly, has not made for itself a splendid reputation.

The second part of the book is devoted to the practical aspects of fishing for salmon with the fly—locating fish, casting techniques, catching and landing fish and various accessories and equipment. The Salmon Fly also includes 46 full page black and white advertisements for mostly angling and sporting pursuits.

== Reviews ==
- James Robb in Notable Angling Literature (1945) wrote:

The Salmon Fly by G. M. Kelson was published in 1895; the sub-title is: How to dress and how to use it. It is a handsome quarto of more than 500 pages and beautifully illustrated. Kelson is regarded as the first writer to whom the amateur could go for proper guidance in salmon fly-dressing

- The American Fly Fisher in 1980:

The Salmon Fly enjoys a unique position in the literature of fly dressing since it brought order and system to the classification of salmon flies and the methodology of salmon fly dressing.

- In 1987 Paul Schullery in American Fly Fishing-A History said of Kelson's The Salmon Fly:

Fly tiers in the Old World responded to an increased availability of exotic feathers and furs with ever more elaborate patterns, the trend reaching is finest statement in George Kelson's The Salmon Fly (1895) and T. E. Pryce Tannant's How to Dress Salmon Flies (1914). Kelson's book, with its excellent color plates and dressings for some three hundred patterns, became the salmon fly's equivalent to Mary Orvis Marbury's Favorite Flies; what the latter book did for the nineteenth-century American wet fly, Kelson's did for the late-Victorian salmon fly.

Kelson's book is considered one of the greatest works on the subject of salmon fishing. The book was not without its controversy as it rekindled some of the rivalry between R. B. Marston, editor of the Fishing Gazette and Kelson. Marston insisted that many of the patterns claimed by Kelson in the book were actually the works of other salmon fishers, not Kelson. Marston also claimed that many patterns attributed to one tier were actually the design of another tier. In the end much of Kelson's reputation was tarnished but the book is still one of the great classics of the era.

According to Kirk Johnson, the author of The Feather Thief (2018) the idea of using of exotic feathers and the suggestion that it increased the success rate of anglers was a pseudoscience spread effectively by Kelson's book. Kelson suggested the use of feathers of such birds as the banded chatterer, the Great American cock, the Nankeen night heron, the South American bittern, and the Ecuadorian cock of the rock. He also considered that it would be a good idea to use the feathers of the Golden Bird of Paradise. This was one of the factors that contributed to a major heist and destruction of scientifically valuable bird specimens from the Natural History Museum at Tring.

== Contents ==
- Chapter I. Introductory.
- Chapter II. Salmon Flies: Their Kinds, Qualities and Materials.
- Chapter III. Salmon Flies: How to "Dress" Them.
- Chapter IV. A List of Standard Flies, With Their "Dressings."
- Chapter V. The Choice of Flies.
- Chapter VI. The Rod and Special Equipments.
  - (1) The Rod
  - (2) The Line.
  - (3) The Winch.
- Chapter VII. The Rod at the Riverside.
  - The Various Methods of Casting, Illustrated, &c., &c.
- Chapter VIII. Miscellaneous.
  - (1) Silkworm Gut
  - (2) Knots
  - (3) Twisting Gut for Loops
  - (4) The Necklace
  - (5) Fly Boxes
  - (6) The Opening Seasons, &c.

== Other editions ==
- Kelson, George M. (1979). The Salmon Fly: How to Dress and How to Use It (Facsimile ed.). Goshen, CT: Anglers and Shooter's Press.
- Kelson, George M. (1995). The Salmon Fly: How to Dress and How to Use It (Centennial ed.). Camden, SC: John Culler & Sons. ISBN 1-887269-00-2.
- Kelson, George M. (1995). The Salmon Fly: How to Dress and How to Use It (Fly Fisher's Classic Library Centenary ed.). Devon U.K.: Bovey Tracy.

== Gallery ==
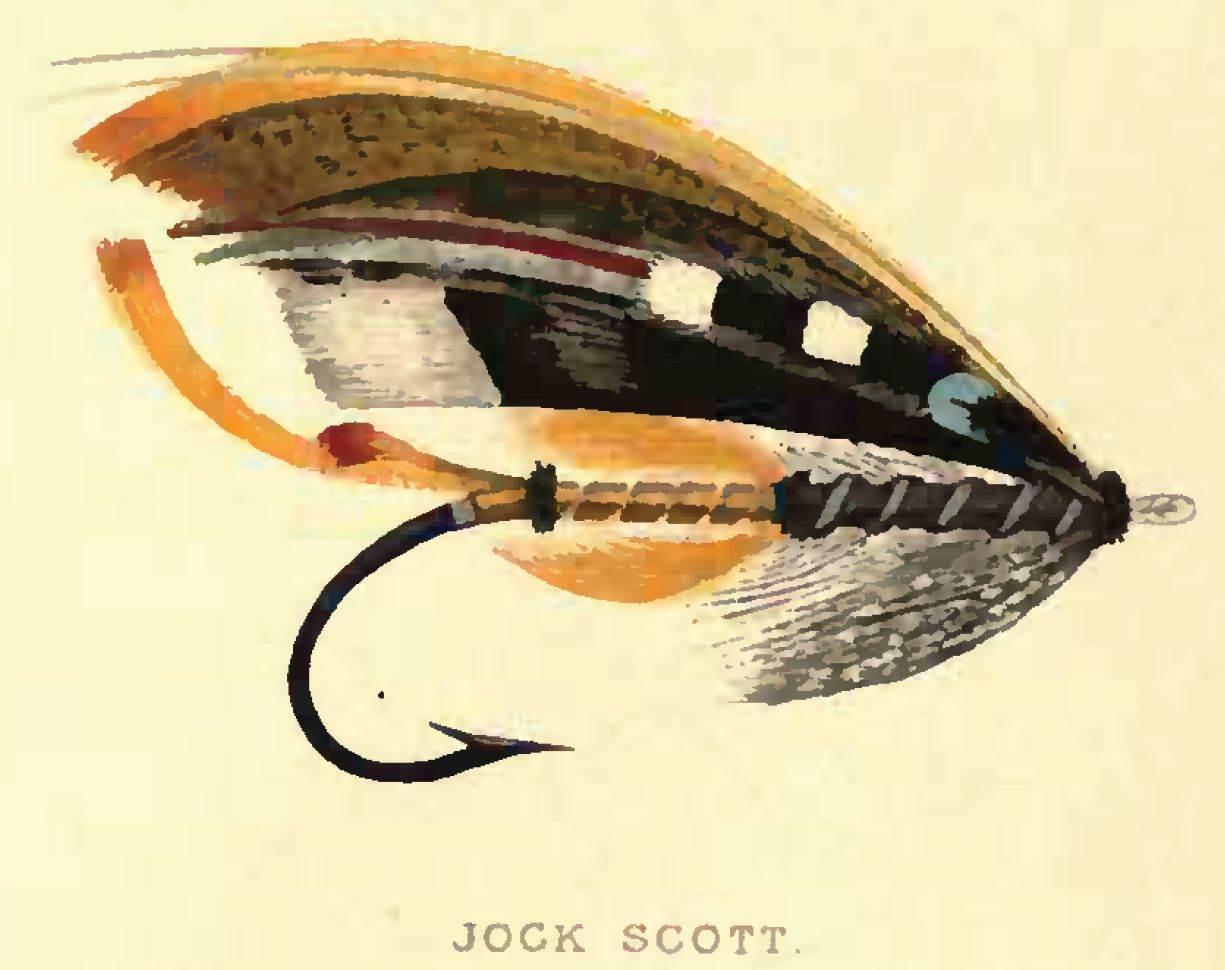
Jock Scott fly - Plate I

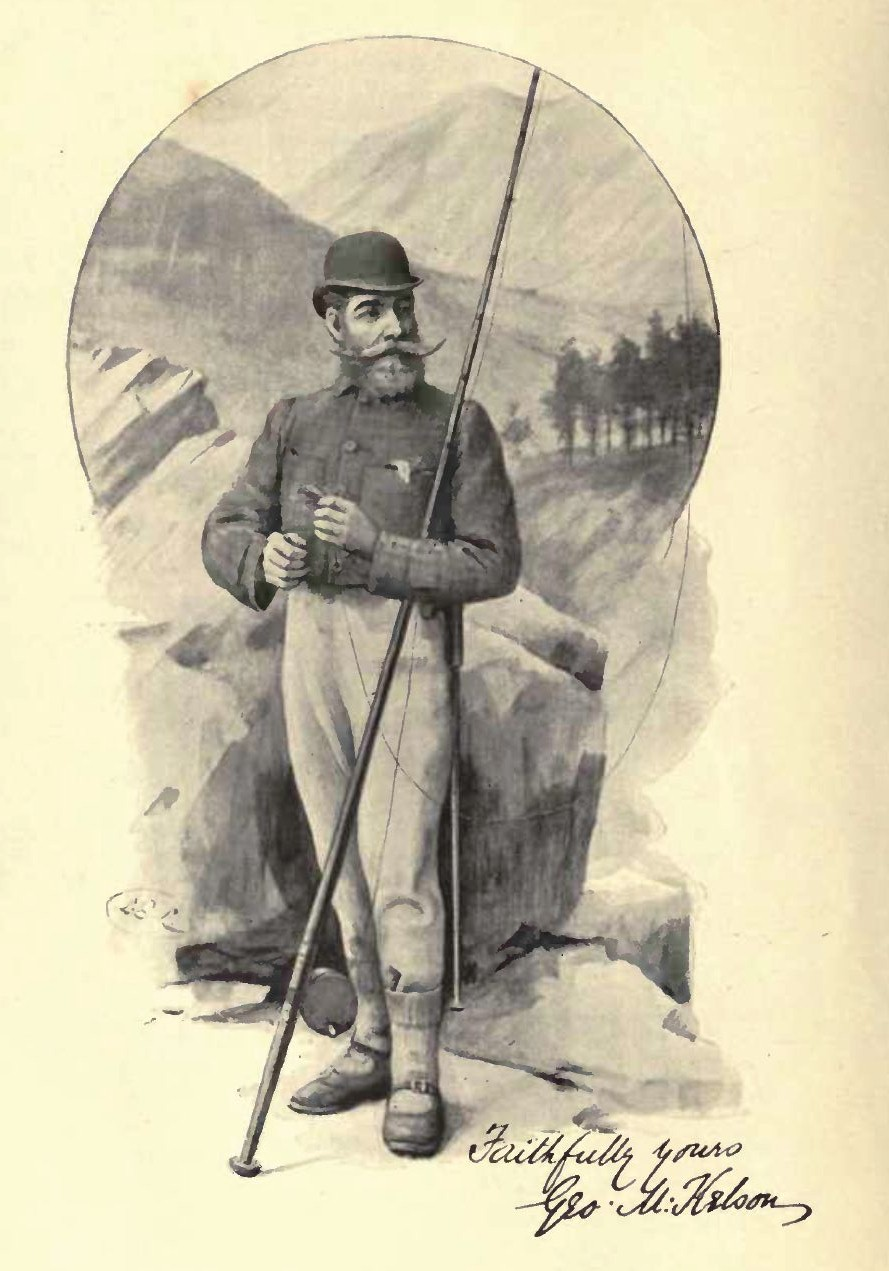
Frontispiece - George M. Kelson

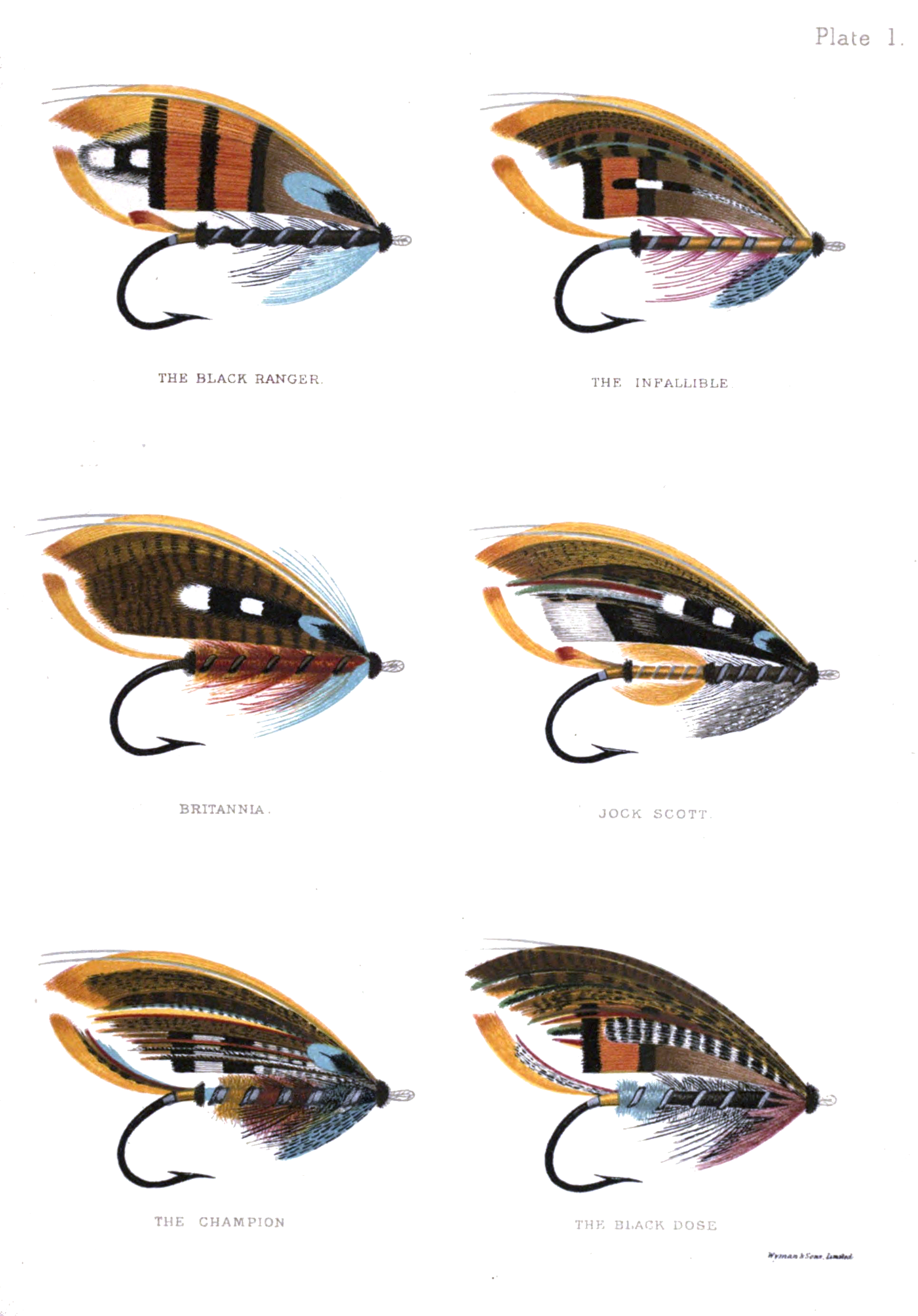
Plate I - Salmon Flies

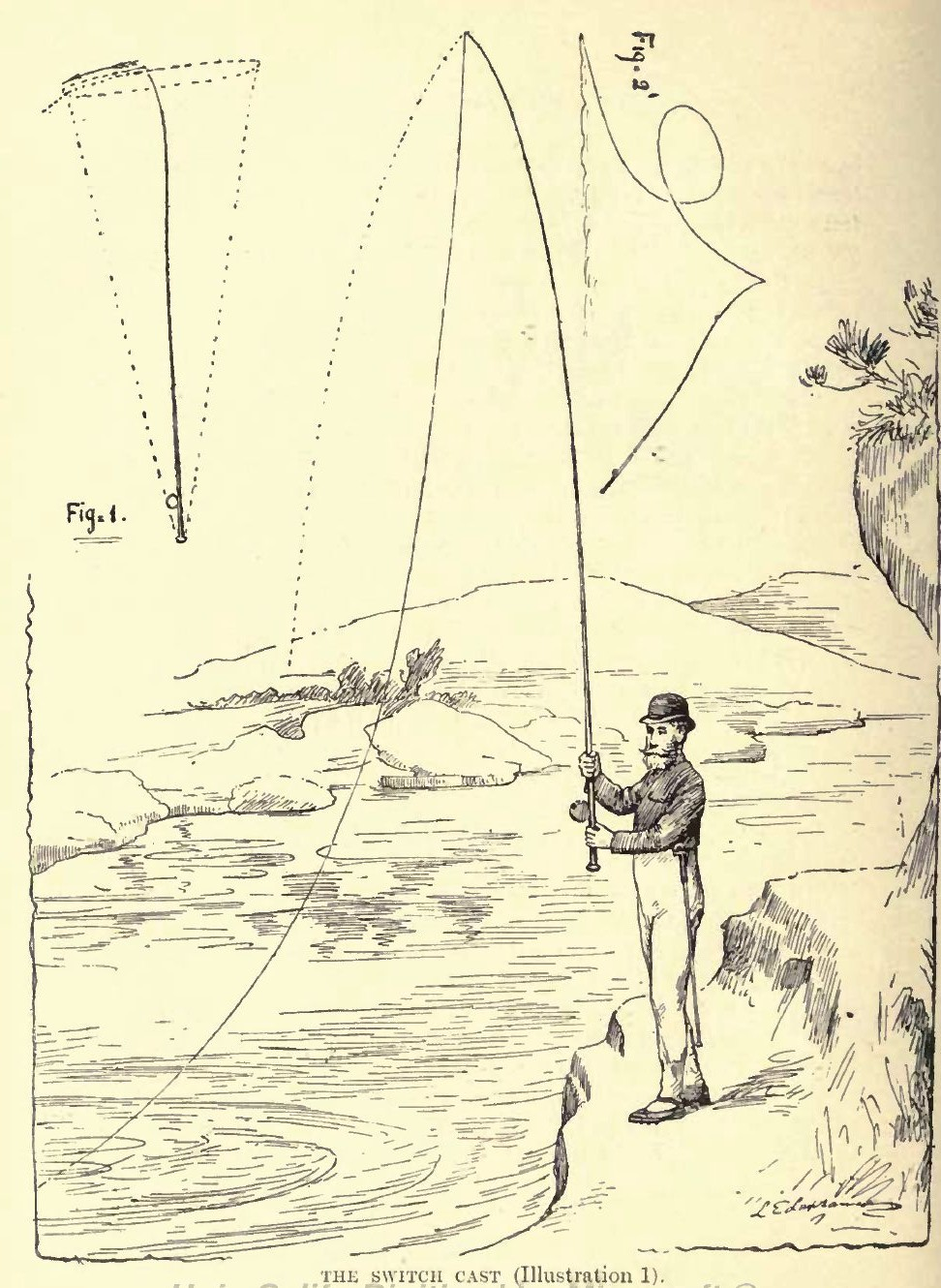
The Switch Cast - Illustration #1

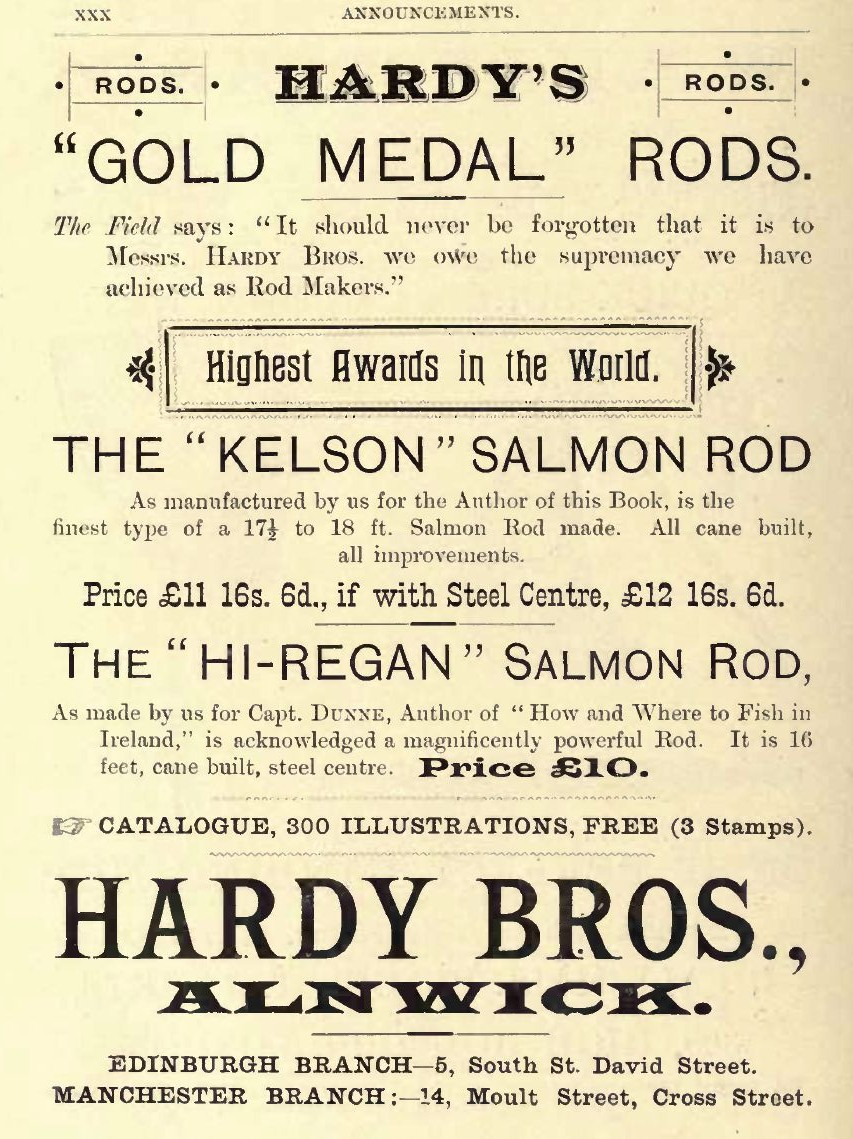
Hardy's Tackle advertisement

== Biography ==
George Mortimer Kelson was born 8 December 1836 in Sevenoaks, Kent, the son of George Kelson and Charlotte Louisa Rich. He died 29 March 1920. He married Emma Herbert in 1866; they had eight children. He was a member of Kent County Cricket Club. He was a juror at the 1883 International Fishing Exhibition in London.

== See also ==
- Bibliography of fly fishing
