= George Kelson =

English cricketer, fisherman, and author

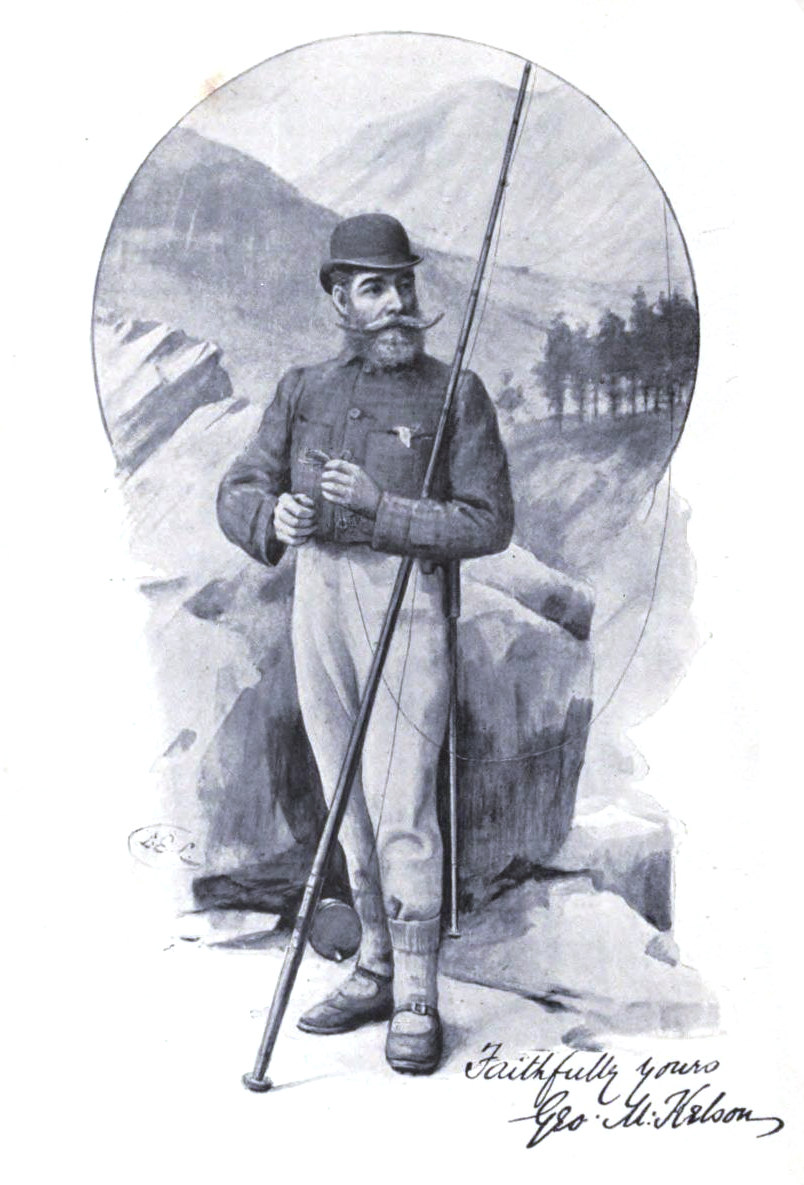

Personal information
- Full name: George Mortimer Kelson
- Born: 8 December 1835; Sevenoaks, Kent
- Died: 29 March 1920 (aged 84); Kingston-upon-Thames, Surrey
- Batting: Right-handed
- Bowling: Right-arm fast (roundarm)

Domestic team information
- Years: Team
- 1859–1873: Kent
- FC debut: 28 July 1859 Kent v Sussex
- Last FC: 25 August 1873 Kent v Sussex

Career statistics
Competition	First-class
Matches	90
Runs scored	2,240
Batting average	14.35
100s/50s	1/9
Top score	122
Balls bowled	3,651
Wickets	76
Bowling average	21.16
5 wickets in innings	2
10 wickets in match	0
Best bowling	6/22
Catches/stumpings	57/2
- Source: CricInfo, 27 February 2018

George Mortimer Kelson (8 December 1835 – 29 March 1920) was an English amateur cricketer, sport angler, and self-promotional author who played for Kent County Cricket Club in the 19th century.

== Biography ==
Kelson was born in Sevenoaks in 1835 to George and Charlotte Louisa Rich (1811–1848). His father was a doctor and Kelson's early life was "comfortable".

=== Cricket ===
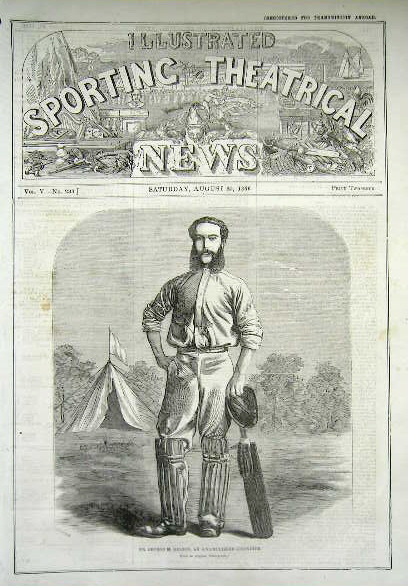
Mr. George M. Kelson, an accomplished cricketer – Illustrated Sporting and Theatrical News, 1866

Kelson made his first-class cricket debut for Kent in July 1859 in a county match against Sussex, going on to become a key member of the Kent team of the 1860s. He was described in The Times and his Wisden obituary as having been "beyond question the best bat in the Kent eleven" at a time when the best Kentish players would not play regularly for the county team. When batting he was described as "a fine punishing player with a free attractive style" and as "a brilliant field and a fairly good change bowler". He played 69 times for Kent, scoring 1,810 runs and taking 41 wickets for the county team which he captained occasionally. His only century came against Surrey in 1863. As well as playing for Kent, Kelson also appeared a number of times of the amateur Gentlemen of Kent team as well as playing for the Gentlemen against the Players and for England teams during the 1860s. He played his final first-class match in 1873.

=== Fly fishing and tying ===
Away from cricket, Kelson was described as a "great fisherman" a "a great horseman, shot, (and) pigeon-racer". He was the fishing editor of Land and Water and wrote widely on the subject, authoring a number of books including The Salmon Fly, considered an important work on salmon flies by some and by some others as developing a pseudoscience around angling with flies. He promoted the sales of fishing gear including an angling cabinet and Jock Scott fishing flies. He made use of the feathers of exotic birds such as toucans, grey junglefowl, turacos, Nankeen night heron and golden pheasant and created designs with fanciful names like "Phoebus", "The Black Prince", and the "Black Riach". He produced promotional chromolithograph cards of his decorated fish flies as part of a series of articles for Land and Water. Robert Bright Marston, the editor of Fishing Gazette invited Kelson to write in 1883. Kelson moved to write in the competing periodical Land and Water from 1885. When Kelson published his book in 1896, Marston was one of the few to give a bad review to the book. Marston noted that meticulous tying of fish flies was not really a necessity. A new edition of his work, The Essential Kelson, was published in 2011. His book on salmon flies influenced a major theft in 2009 of numerous invaluable bird specimens held in the Natural History Museum at Tring.

Kelson died at Surbiton in the Royal Borough of Kingston upon Thames in 1920 aged 85.
