= Herl =

- Municipality
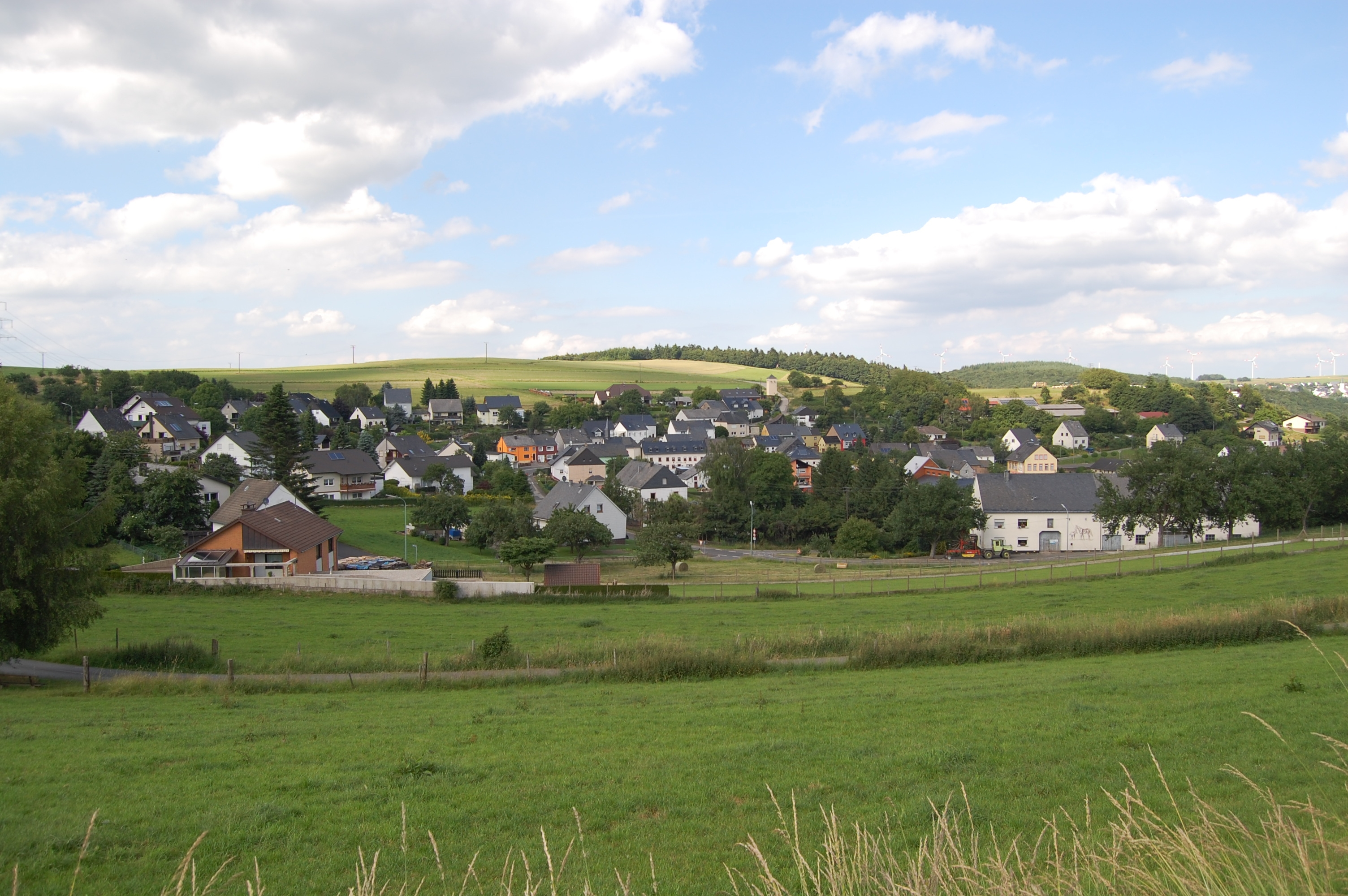

- Coat of arms

- Location of Herl within Trier-Saarburg district
- Interactive map of Herl
- Location within Germany Location within Rhineland-Palatinate
- Coordinates: 49°44′N 6°49′E
- Country: Germany
- State: Rhineland-Palatinate
- District: Trier-Saarburg
- Municipal assoc.: Ruwer

Government
  - Mayor (2019–24): Thomas Jost

Area
  - Total: 2.83 km^{2} (1.09 sq mi)
- Elevation: 400 m (1,300 ft)

Population (2025-12-31)
  - Total: 236
  - Density: 83.4/km^{2} (216/sq mi)
- Time zone: UTC+01:00 (CET)
  - Summer (DST): UTC+02:00 (CEST)
- Postal codes: 54317
- Dialling codes: 06500
- Vehicle registration: TR
- Website: www.herl.eu

Herl is a municipality in the Trier-Saarburg district, in Rhineland-Palatinate, Germany.
