= Robert Bright Marston =

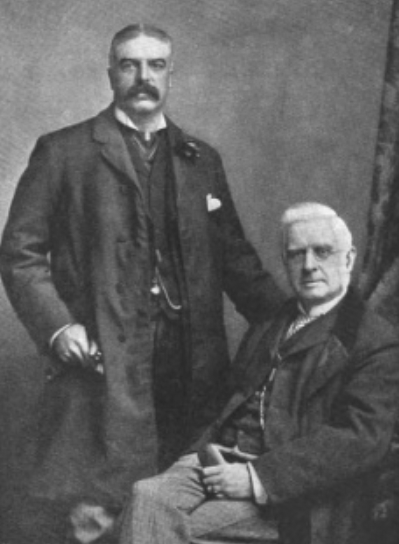
Robert Bright Marston (standing) with his father Edward Marston, c. 1895

Robert Bright Marston (30 May 1853 – 2 September 1927) was an English angling enthusiast, publisher, and writer. He was the son of a partner of the publishing house Sampson Low, Marston and Co. and was involved in publishing books and edited the influential periodical Fishing Gazette (from 1878) for the angling community.

== Life and work ==
Marston was born at 36 Upper Park Street, Islington, the first child of bookseller-publisher Edward (1825–1914) and Mary, née Pratt (d. 1888). He went to school in Croydon and Bonn before going to Islington Proprietary School. He then became a clerk at his father's publishing company Sampson Low, Son & Marston. In 1881 he married Fanny (1856–1933), daughter of builder Joseph Preston and they would have four sons and three daughters. He became a partner in the publishing company of his father in 1883 and edited a Publisher's Circular from 1900 to 1926. He was also a newsagent for the publishing house of William Dawson and Sons.

Marston became interested in angling at an early age and caught carp in Shropshire even before he could read. He went angling across Britain and Europe and became an expert on angling and came to know all the famous anglers on the time including the editors of The Field. He knew many people from the literary world through his publishing industry connections and many also became angling friends like the novelist R. D. Blackmore and H. M. Stanley. According to the Fishing Gazette which he edited from 1878, he had fished every trout and grayling river in England and Wales. He collected books on fishing and published several books written by others such as Halford's Floating Flies and How to Dress them (1886) and Dry-fly fishing in theory and practice (1889). He edited Izaak Walton's The Compleat Angler, producing several editions including the 100th. He admired Walton greatly and helped in the installation of a memorial stained-glass window to Walton at the Winchester Cathedral.

Marston gained influence after becoming the editor of the Fishing Gazette in 1878. It grew in popularity and was involved in setting up angling tournaments, promoting the sale of angling equipment, the promotion of photography and campaigning against water pollution. In 1883 he contributed to the organization of the International Fisheries Exhibition. In 1912 he established the Flyfisher's Journal In 1919 he was a member of a committee that studied Damage to Fisheries. His influence also spread into the United States, particularly because of his involvement in the introduction of brown trout in the Catskill mountains, and a species of trout was named as Salmo marstoni by Garman in 1893. This is however considered a synonym of Salvelinus alpinus. In 1897 he became concerned with food storage and import and wrote a book War, Famine and Our Food Supply (1897).

Marston died of cerebral haemorrhage at his home on 160 Denmark Hill, London. He was buried at Highgate cemetery.
