= Jock Scott fly =

Fly fishing pattern

- Artificial fly
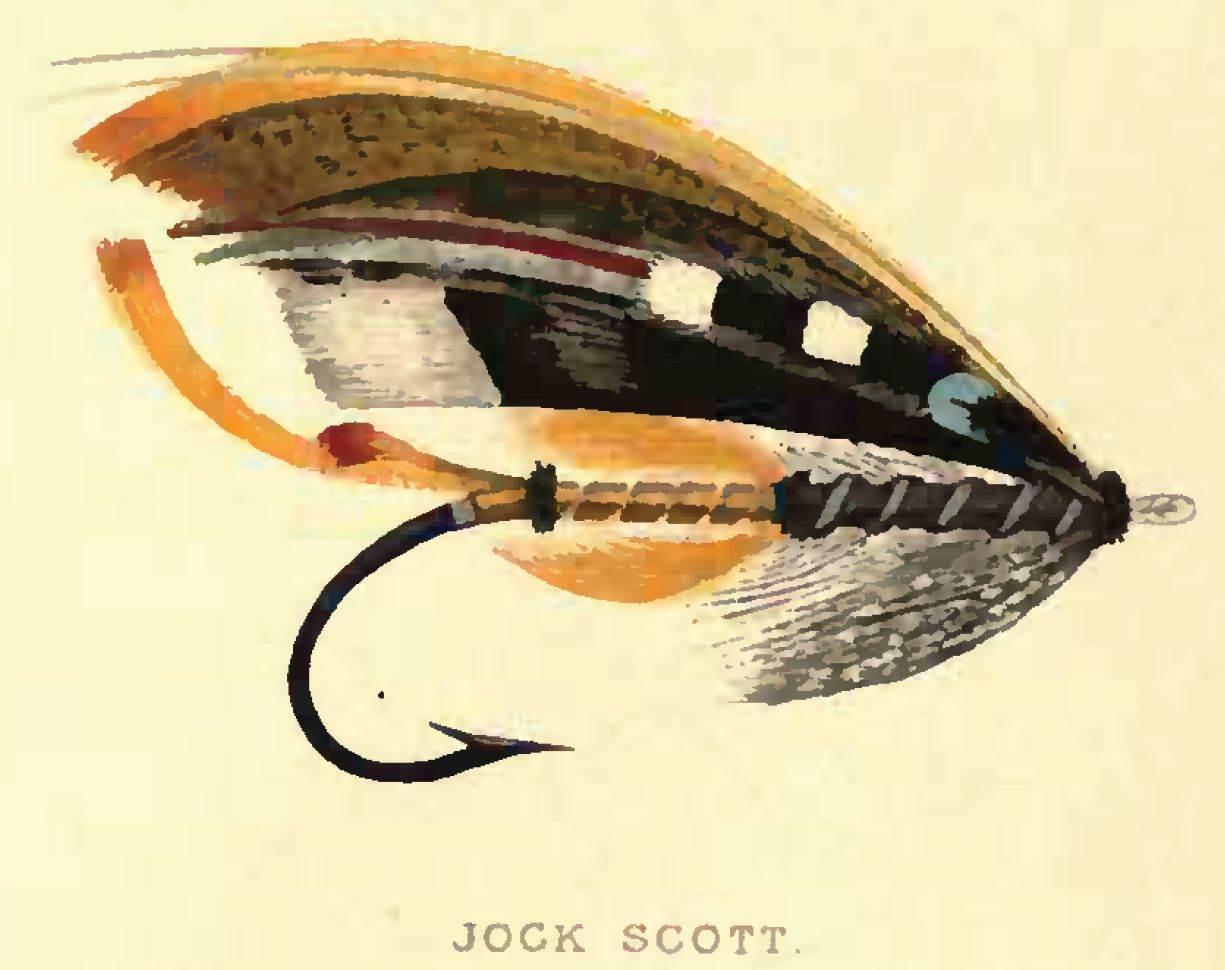
- Jock Scott Salmon Fly
- Type: Salmon fly

History
- Creator: John (Jock) Scott
- Created: 1850

Materials
- Typical sizes: 1 ¼ to 3 inches
- Typical hooks: Salmon fly hook
- Tail: A Topping and Indian Crow
- Body: golden yellow and black floss, black herl, Toucan feathers,
- Wing: pair of black White-tipped Turkey tail strips; “mixed” sheath of “married” strands of Peacock wing, Yellow, Scarlet and Blue Swan, Bustard, Florican and Golden Pheasant tail; two strands of Peacock sword feather above; “married” narrow strips of Teal and barred Summer Duck at the sides; brown Mallard over two strands of Peacock sword feather above; Jungle cock
- Ribbing: Fine oval silver tinsel, black floss
- Hackle: black hackle
- Tag: Silver tinsel
- Butt: Black Herl
- Throat: Speckled Gallina
- Cheek: Blue Chatterer; a Topping over all.
- Shoulder: horn of blue and yellow Macaw

The Jock Scott is a dressed salmon fly created in 1850 by John (Jock) Scott, born at Branxholm in Roxburghshire in 1817.

The Jock Scott has been used as a metaphor for fly fishing in general. The protagonist of The Edwardians by Vita Sackville-West is described as follows at the coronation of George V: "He was bored, he was disgusted; he wished that he might be casting a Jock Scott into the Tay."

The Jock Scott was created in 1850. See David Zincavage's article for more details. Many of the original components are from rare birds.
