= List of Mad Dogs episodes =

Mad Dogs is a British television serial, written by Cris Cole. The series premiered in the United Kingdom on 10 February 2011 on Sky1 with a four-part first series. Series two and three also contained four parts each, broadcasting in early 2012 and June 2013 respectively. It concluded with a two-part fourth and final series on 28 and 29 December 2013. Mad Dogs follows four lifelong friends, Baxter (John Simm), Quinn (Philip Glenister), Rick (Marc Warren) and Woody (Max Beesley), who spend a week in Majorca to celebrate the early retirement of Alvo (Ben Chaplin), another friend. However, as time goes by the friends become embroiled in the world of crime and police corruption after Alvo is murdered.

== Series overview ==
Series	Episodes	Originally released		Average viewers (millions)
Series	Episodes	First released	Last released	Average viewers (millions)
1	4	10 February 2011	3 March 2011	1.592 (Note: Based from the consolidated ratings from the first series for Sky1)
2	4	19 January 2012	9 February 2012	1.542 (Note: Based from the consolidated ratings from the second series for Sky1)
3	4	4 June 2013	25 June 2013	0.961 (Note: Based from the consolidated ratings from the third series for Sky1, the figure includes Sky1 +1)
4	2	28 December 2013	29 December 2013	0.920 (Note: Based from the consolidated ratings from the fourth series for Sky1, the figure includes Sky1 +1)

== Episodes ==
=== Series 1 (2011) ===
No.	Title	Directed by	Written by	Original release date	UK viewers (millions)
1	"Episode 1"	Adrian Shergold	Cris Cole	10 February 2011	1.613
The episode begins with four long-time friends Baxter (John Simm), Rick (Marc Warren), Woody (Max Beesley) and Quinn (Philip Glenister) recording messages to their loved ones. A week earlier, the four arrive in Majorca, Spain to celebrate the early retirement of another friend Alvo (Ben Chaplin), who made himself wealthy in the property business. Over the course of the first three days, Rick has a one-night stand with Lottie (Eloise Joseph), a tourist from Barnsley. Also, the group become concerned with Alvo's increasingly erratic behaviour after finding a dead goat floating in his swimming pool. When they go deep sea fishing, Alvo admits he stole the boat, and at the insistence of the others, they return to the villa. As the group argue during the evening, a man wearing a Tony Blair mask (Tomás Pozzi), nicknamed "Tiny Blair" by Rick due to his height, breaks into the villa and shoots Alvo in the head for stealing the boat.
2	"Episode 2"	Adrian Shergold	Cris Cole	17 February 2011	1.523
"Tiny Blair" takes steps to frame Baxter by rubbing the gun on his face and forcing him to spit into a handkerchief, which he then pockets. Before leaving, he warns them not to go to the police, claiming to be an officer himself. The four bury Alvo's body and spend the night cleaning the scene, agreeing that should the police get suspicious about Alvo's disappearance, they will say he went to the mainland. Rick recalls leaving his video camera on the boat, containing visual evidence of their presence (he does not know that Alvo had thrown it overboard). They proceed there to clean away all evidence of their presence when two men arrive at the boat and find bags of cocaine. Thinking the four are the owners, they are paid three million euros. They return to the villa and decide to hide the money in a rental car until they leave for England at the end of their holiday. Upon returning to the villa, police arrive, headed by detective María (María Botto). She interviews the four individually about Alvo's behaviour. In the end, María discovers Quinn's camera (forgotten on a shelf) and through it witnesses the five of them talking about the boat.
3	"Episode 3"	Adrian Shergold	Cris Cole	24 February 2011	1.456
After another visit from María, the four come to realise that they have been caught up in activities set up by the Serbian mafia. Knowing the mafia were responsible for the murder of Jesus, the owner of the boat, who had his hands and feet removed, Rick panics, and the four get into another argument. They later decide to bring Alvo's body to the boat, and cut off his arms and feet to make it look like a mob hit. When they return to the villa, "Tiny Blair" demands to know where the boat is; Rick disarms him. The four plan to reason with the mafia by demanding safe passage back to England in return for him. They decide to bring the tape to the police, but after realising the police may not be involved in the first place, they go to the same hotel Lottie is staying to ask her to drive the car holding the drug money to the villa for the following day. After returning to the villa, they find somebody had previously broken in and executed their prisoner, leaving behind the message; "we told you not to go to the police."
4	"Episode 4"	Adrian Shergold	Cris Cole	3 March 2011	1.775
After burying "Tiny Blair", the four see flares firing overhead, followed by a power cut in the villa, which Woody believes are scare tactics set up by the Serbians. The next morning, María returns to tell them the police have found the boat, and the Serbians may be after them, and gives them one last chance for protection. Woody turns it down, not believing she is a police officer. The four get into another argument, resulting in a fight, but later reconcile. Through their video cameras and footage from the boat Rick took, Baxter realises that Alvo was involved in drug smuggling, and that María manipulated the four; there was no Serbian mafia, only corrupt police officers. After they record the video messages shown in the first episode, Lottie returns with the car. The four prepare to leave the money behind while they proceed to the airport, but are stopped by María who intends to kill them, but Quinn kills her first. He then reveals that he will stay behind with most of the money, while the others return to England. In the end, Quinn sees an armed Dominic (Tim Woodward), the detective who organised the drug running, approaching the villa.

=== Series 2 (2012) ===
No.	Title	Directed by	Written by	Original release date	UK viewers (millions)
5	"Episode 1"	James Hawes	Cris Cole	19 January 2012	1.679
Baxter, Rick and Woody save Quinn by running over Dominic. The four then leave the island by ferry to Barcelona, but board one to Ibiza by mistake instead. Quinn suffers from shock after killing María. Baxter reveals he took the money with them, and believes they should start a new life with it. Rick proposes they gamble the money in order to exchange the laundered notes for legitimate ones. Baxter is approached by a young woman, Carmen (Leticia Dolera), who reveals she knows their intention, but offers to help them exchange the notes faster; the group decides to bring her on board. She will take the money to exchange, and as collateral they look after her mother. Carmen raises her commission when she learns it is drug money. Later, they are instructed to meet her colleague, Hector (Vicente Diaz); they are given the money, but find the group have a new nemesis; their rental car explodes soon after.
6	"Episode 2"	James Hawes	Cris Cole	26 January 2012	1.610
The men hide from a man in a motorcycle, who returns to the car to ensure they are dead. When the ruse initially succeeds, the four proceed to a nearby abandoned village to stay the night, however Rick wishes to split from the group after they are done. When they arrive at the village, the four hide the money inside a hollowed Virgin Mary statue of a local church. The next morning a local elderly woman who practices santería "protects" them by lining goat's blood around the village. Baxter and Carmen, who joined them while searching for Hector, connect and have sex, while Woody and Rick argue at the bar. Quinn has a crisis of faith, and later crosses the line of goat blood. As a consequence he is captured by Mackenzie (David Warner), a British expatriate who reveals the money is his, and wants it returned within 24 hours or they will die. When he brings Quinn back to relay the message, they discover they are €114,000 short. As they plan to raise the money, they find Hector dead.
7	"Episode 3"	James Hawes	Cris Cole	2 February 2012	1.445
Two weeks previously, it is revealed that Alvo wished to stop working for Mackenzie, but he, Dominic and María pressure him to do another job. In the present, the group decide to wire transfer their savings and Hector's commission to raise the money, but they are still €54,000 short. Carmen suggests they break into a safe in the nightclub where she works. After they agree however, Woody recalls Alvo left €50,000 in his safe (they took the safe because their mobile phones are inside, and they were never given the combination before he was murdered). They manage to break into the safe and Quinn sells his watch. Woody and Baxter also steal from two living statues. After recovering the hidden money from the church (as a wedding takes place), they journey to the rendezvous. They meet with Mackenzie, but inform him they are short €100; earlier they were pulled over by police for speeding, and had to pay the fine with some of his money.
8	"Episode 4"	James Hawes	Cris Cole	9 February 2012	1.432
Mackenzie assigns the group a task at which point they would be free to return home, but forces Quinn to stay with him in his caravan. Mackenzie admits that although he is rich enough, he cannot let the three million euros go because of his reputation. The rest are instructed to pick up supplies to produce ecstasy from a cabana. En route Baxter returns for Carmen. After making the ecstasy, Carmen exits the van to wait for Baxter later. They deliver the ecstasy in a nightclub. After they receive five million euros as payment, they drive back to Mackenzie's caravan in time to save Quinn. It is revealed that Mackenzie made them produce fake tablets to fool the nightclub owners. Mackenzie lets them go, instructing them to board a cargo container, which will take them back to the mainland via ferry. As an extra, he allows them to keep the money. Baxter is forced to leave Carmen behind, though he intends to contact her when they arrive in Barcelona. However, they later find that Mackenzie has tricked them; the ferry arrives in Morocco and the money is confiscated by armed men, who arrest them.

=== Series 3 (2013) ===
No.	Title	Directed by	Written by	Original release date	UK viewers (millions)
9	"Episode 1"	Adrian Shergold	Cris Cole	4 June 2013	1.021 (Note: 957,000 on Sky1, 64,000 on Sky1 +1)
Two days after their arrest, Baxter, Quinn, Rick and Woody are being held in a British secret prison in the Moroccan desert, meeting fellow prisoner, Mercedes (Jaime Winstone). The four are later released by a British official (Anton Lesser). However, en route, their vehicle breaks down and the driver disappears, at which point the four are fired upon. After they are rescued by the official, he reveals the four have stumbled on an operation from the Central Intelligence Agency, who are using the drug operation in Majorca as a means for funding black operations. As a result of their interference there is a kill contract out on them. Their only option is to live new lives and identities in another country. They are allowed to call their families before flying to South Africa, where they are forced to go their separate ways. Not wanting to be alone, Rick pleads with Woody to stay with him, but Woody tells him to "be a man about it". Left alone, Rick suffers a breakdown, and then spots a Tikoloshe watching him from a distance.
10	"Episode 2"	Adrian Shergold	Cris Cole	11 June 2013	0.898 (Note: 844,000 on Sky1, 54,000 on Sky1 +1)
Two years later in Cape Town, it is revealed that Rick, still being haunted by the Tikoloshe, is a drug dealer who is later arrested after dealing to an undercover narcotics officer. Meanwhile, Woody is buying black market pharmaceuticals for local hospitals while in a relationship with Shani, Quinn runs a bar while having an affair with a French diplomat's wife, and Baxter runs his own legal firm, though he is not a registered lawyer in South Africa. A young female client learns of this and blackmails him. Baxter later stumbles upon a news report stating that MacKenzie was shot to death, indicating that the CIA operation has been shut down. Baxter tracks down Quinn's bar, leaves him a note, and Quinn, who is secretly in touch with Woody, relays the message. The three meet at a beach and track Rick to an addiction meeting, where Woody, disguised as an addict, helps him escape, with the help of Shani's son who guides the guards in the wrong direction, the four reunite and set off their plan to return home.
11	"Episode 3"	Adrian Shergold	Cris Cole	18 June 2013	0.920 (Note: 837,000 on Sky1, 83,000 on Sky1 +1)
The men arrive at the British Consulate, only to learn that their kill contract is still active. After escaping from the police, they return to Baxter's apartment, where they learn Rick has an ankle monitor. Woody removes it and throws it to a passing truck before they gain more police attention. They reunite with Mercedes at Quinn's bar, who helps them leave Cape Town. The group come across a tribal gang on the way, who are rumoured to have been snatching corpses, and cutting them open to use their internal organs to create "dwarf zombies". However, when they arrive at the village of the tribe after failing to tie a float which they lost Mercedes gave them, they learn the tribespeople speak fluent English, and had in fact taken the presumed "corpses" to local hospitals to save their lives - the accident victims had not in fact been dead. The tribe allows the men to stay overnight. The next morning, a member of the tribe tells them to keep walking in a particular direction. After walking for an indeterminate amount of time, Rick's Tikoloshe appears in front of them.
12	"Episode 4"	Adrian Shergold	Cris Cole	25 June 2013	1.003 (Note: 914,000 on Sky1, 89,000 on Sky1 +1)
The four arrive at the home of Lazaro (Stanley Townsend), a retired CIA agent. Lazaro returns home to find the four fighting and breaks them up. The men explain what has happened to them and ask him to remove their names from the hit list. He complies, and reveals to them what happened to their families, such as Rick's wife divorcing him for desertion, and Quinn's father has had his telephone cut off for not paying the bill. Later, they have a celebratory dinner where Lazaro gives them peyote, which makes them euphoric. They each have separate dreams relating to the people they met in Cape Town. The next morning, Lazaro reveals he intends to kill them as revenge for the death of María, who happened to be a CIA agent. The four subdue the agent, though he escapes and is about to kill them, when Mercedes arrives to shoot Lazaro dead. She later sends the CIA an instant message, fooling the agency that the four men are dead. Mercedes gets a friend with a helicopter to fly them to Cape Town. She waves goodbye to them from the house, as does the Tikoloshe who only Rick can see, Rick waves back.

=== Series 4 (2013) ===
No.	Title	Directed by	Written by	Original release date	UK viewers (millions)
13	"Episode 1"	Adrian Shergold	Cris Cole	28 December 2013	0.908 (Note: 885,000 on Sky1, 23,000 on Sky1 +1)
Baxter, Quinn, Rick and Woody are cleared by the CIA, and two months later they return to England to attend the wedding of Baxter's daughter Emma, while in Majorca, Dominic is revealed to still be alive, although bound by wheelchair; looking for the four. After seeing the Tikoloshe that still continues to haunt him, Rick fights with Quinn concerning Quinn staying at Rick's ex-wife’s house while in town for the wedding. Baxter and Woody join in to defend Quinn, when they learn that Rick tried to sell Alvo's home out front under then, having signed everyone's names without permission. The ensuing fight ends up with them getting banned from the party and arrested for the night. Two months later, the four men, now wealthy from selling Alvo's villa, visit Quinn's villa in Cape Town. Baxter reunites with Carmen. Woody continues his work in South Africa and reunites with Shani. Rick continues his community service from his previous arrest. After jumping into Quinn's swimming pool to get clean, Rick spots another dead goat floating in it (all but Rick believe it to be a coincidence). Baxter receives a letter demanding a court appearance after failing to return the car he rented in Majorca which was destroyed later in Ibiza. Little does he know that the woman who delivered the letter works with Dominic, who found them. Quinn's wife Christiane gets suspicious of what is going on outside and investigates, where she is dragged to the bushes and killed. Her body is then thrown into the pool as Dominic and his men arrive in Cape Town.
14	"Episode 2"	Adrian Shergold	Cris Cole	29 December 2013	0.931 (Note: 895,000 on Sky1, 36,000 on Sky1 +1)
When the four men and Carmen find Quinn's wife dead in the pool, they are shot at, prompting them to hide in the panic room. They find that they are being stalked by a man in a Tony Blair mask, leading the group to believe that the Majorcan drug gang is out for revenge. When Shani arrives, Woody makes her go to Quinn's bar. When the assassin follows her, the group leaves to rescue her, arming themselves from Quinn's weapons cache, although unknown to Quinn only two of the guns are loaded. They find themselves chased by more men in Blair masks, prompting them to hide in a shelter after escaping a traffic jam. They hear noises from another room and, believing they are the sounds of the assassins, Baxter empties his pistol toward the room, inadvertently killing Carmen. They are forced to leave her behind and drive to the beach, where one of Rick's friends has arranged to meet them. However, when they arrive, they realise they were set up, finding a large group of gangsters and Dominic, who capture them. After the gang puts the hoods over their heads, they appear as if they are about to be executed. However, moments pass and they realize that the entire gang has left them alone. As they drive away, Baxter sees a car pass with two men in Blair masks. One of them unmasks himself to reveal another Baxter. After they ponder if their ordeal is over, their car drives off of an unfinished interchange, and plunges into the water. On Twitter, Max Beesley confirms the episode's ending from another user: The four were indeed executed on the beach, and their souls left to realise their past mistakes. The Baxter behind the Blair mask represents the four as their own worst enemies, and the four drive off the interchange to an unknown future.
