= Joanne Froggatt =

English actress (born 1980)

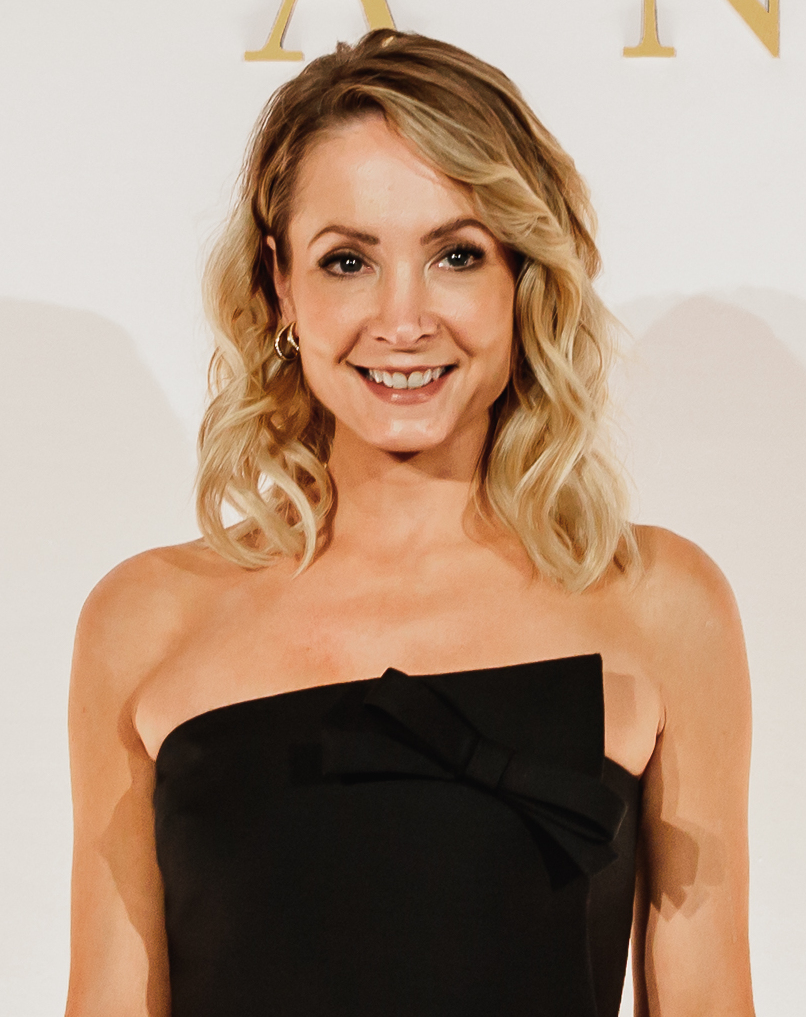
- Froggatt in 2022
- Born: 23 August 1980 (age 46); Littlebeck, North Yorkshire, England
- Occupation: Actress
- Years active: 1996–present
- Notable work: Downton Abbey
- Spouse: James Cannon (m. 2012; sep. 2020)
- Children: 1

Joanne Froggatt (/ˈfrɒɡət/; born 23 August 1980) is a British actress. From 2010 to 2015, she portrayed Anna Bates in the ITV period drama series Downton Abbey, for which she received three Emmy nominations and won the 2014 Golden Globe Award for Best Supporting Actress. From 2017 to 2020, she starred as Laura Nielson in the ITV/Sundance drama series Liar. She currently stars in the role of Jan De Souza in MobLand.

Froggatt rose to prominence with her portrayal of Zoe Tattersall on the soap opera Coronation Street (1997–1998). She played Ruth Tyler, Sam Tyler's mother, in the original UK version of the fantasy police drama Life on Mars (2006). She went on to star in the television films Danielle Cable: Eyewitness (2003), See No Evil: The Moors Murders (2006), and Murder in the Outback (2007), before winning the British Independent Film Award for Most Promising Newcomer for her leading role in In Our Name (2010). Other film credits include Filth (2013), A Street Cat Named Bob (2016), Mary Shelley (2017), and Downton Abbey (2019).

== Early life and education ==
Froggatt was born and brought up in the village of Littlebeck in North Yorkshire. Her parents, Ann and Keith Froggatt, having run a corner shop, next started a rare-breed sheep farm on a smallholding near Whitby. Froggatt has likened her childhood setting to the backdrop of Emily Brontë's classic novel Wuthering Heights. Froggatt initially joined a drama group in Scarborough, and then left her family home at the age of 13 to attend the Redroofs Theatre School in Maidenhead, Berkshire.

== Career ==
In 1996, Froggatt made her TV debut in the long-running ITV drama The Bill, and shortly afterwards landed the role of teenage mother Zoe Tattersall in Coronation Street. She left the programme in 1998, when her character was written out. In 1999, she appeared in the first four episodes of the first series of prison drama Bad Girls, portraying teenage mother Rachel Hicks.

In 2003, Froggatt played the leading role in the controversial one-off drama Danielle Cable: Eyewitness, based on the true story of a teenage girl who witnessed the murder of her boyfriend in a reputed road rage attack. While researching the role, she met Cable, who later contacted her to commend her on her portrayal. The film earned a BAFTA TV Award nomination for Best Single Drama.

Froggatt played the role of Angelique Mahy in the ITV mini-series Island at War, which tells the story of the German occupation of the Channel Islands. It aired on 11 July 2004. In the same year, she played Myra in the BBC Radio 4 drama My Turn to Make the Tea by Monica Dickens.

Froggatt starred as a main character in the drama Missing, made by SMG Productions in 2006, alongside Gregor Fisher. The two-part thriller was not broadcast on STV until November 2008, because ITV had changed its format to 60-minute time slots and Missing was two 90-minute time slots.

Also in 2006, Froggatt played the sister of Myra Hindley in the ITV drama See No Evil: The Moors Murders. She later appeared in another controversial role as the title character in Joanne Lees: Murder in the Outback, which first aired on Channel Ten in Australia on 18 March 2007, and was screened in Britain on ITV on 8 April 2007. The role involved the depiction of a real-life kidnap, in which Froggatt had to perform scenes tied up with tape around her mouth as a gag. She appeared on the London stage in the adaptation of All About My Mother in the part of Sister Rosa, which ran from July to November 2007 at the Old Vic Theatre.

Froggatt portrayed Kate, a peasant, in the third season of the BBC TV series Robin Hood. She played Hannah in Spooks: Code 9, and features in the BBC Radio adaptation of Solaris as Rheya. In May 2009, she played Kelly in the BBC drama Moving On.

On 25 September 2009, Froggatt played the title role in the BBC Radio Four play I Am Emma Humphreys. On 3 October of that year, Froggatt played Princess Yvonne in the BBC Radio Four Saturday play The Von Trapps and Me.

On 15 April 2010, Froggatt appeared opposite Lee Ingleby in the BBC Radio Four play The Disappearance by Peter Walley. In her film début, In Our Name, Froggatt played Suzy, a soldier suffering from post-traumatic stress disorder. She garnered critical acclaim for her performance, and won Best Newcomer at the British Independent Film Awards.

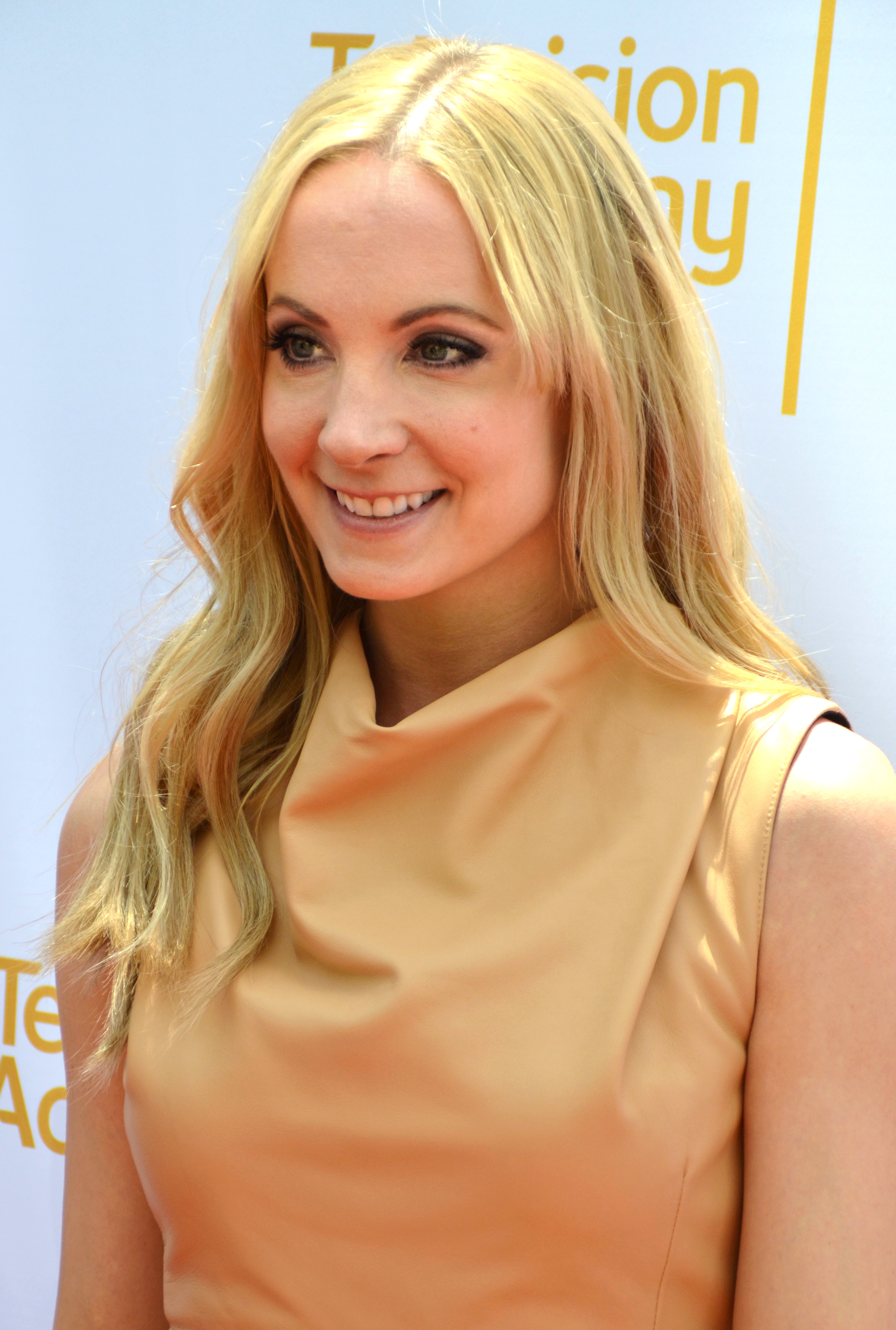
Joanne Froggatt at the Television Academy Downton Abbey Tea and scone party at Paramount studios 2014

Starting in 2010, Froggatt appeared in Downton Abbey as Anna, lady's maid to Lady Mary Crawley, for which she received an Emmy nomination in both 2012 and 2014. On 11 January 2015, she was awarded the Golden Globe for Best Supporting Actress in a Series, Mini-Series, or TV Movie for the role.

On 25 December 2010, Froggatt appeared in the Royle Family Christmas special, "Joe's Crackers", as Saskia, the girlfriend of Antony Royle. Despite having been mentioned by name in earlier episodes, this was the first time that Saskia had appeared in person. Froggatt starred in John Donnelly's play The Knowledge at the Bush Theatre, West London, from 12 January to 19 February 2011.

Along with Downton Abbey in 2013, Froggatt had roles in the comedy drama based on Irvine Welsh's novel Filth, in the thriller uwantme2killhim?, and an indie directed by Uberto Pasolini, Still Life.

In 2015, she played Wendy in the new Bob the Builder series, voicing her in both the UK and US versions. In 2016, she starred in a two-part ITV mini-series titled Dark Angel, based on the true story of Victorian poisoner Mary Ann Cotton. Also in 2016, she co-starred in the film Starfish, an adaptation of a true story about Tom Ray, a man whose limbs were amputated after having contracted sepsis. Froggatt portrayed Nic, his wife.

In 2017, Froggatt appeared in the lead role of schoolteacher Laura Neilson in the six-part thriller mini-series Liar on ITV. Her character awakens, convinced that she was raped by respected surgeon Andrew Earlham (Ioan Gruffudd), who is also the father of one of her students, even though she cannot remember the incident, nor does forensic evidence bear out her version of events. The series aired in the US on SundanceTV.

Froggatt began performances on 25 February 2019 as Frances Thorpe in the thriller Alys, Always, at the Bridge Theatre in London. The play was directed by Nicholas Hytner and written by Lucinda Coxon, and based on the book by Harriet Lane.

In 2022, she starred in Last Light, an apocalyptic thriller TV series on Peacock.

Since 2025, Froggatt has starred in a main role in Paramount+ drama Mobland, playing Jan DaSouza, the wife of Tom Hardy's character.

== Personal life ==
Froggatt married long-time boyfriend James Cannon in a private ceremony in October 2012. In February 2020, she confirmed they had separated, described as a divorce by 2022.

In 2013, Froggatt became an ambassador for global children's charity Plan UK's "Because I Am a Girl" campaign.

At the 2024 Into Film Awards in London, Froggatt revealed her pregnancy. She has a daughter, born in September 2024. She has not revealed the identity of the father.

== Filmography ==
=== Film ===
Year	Title	Role	Notes
2002	Miranda	Jacquie	
2009	Echoes	Anya	Short film
2010	In Our Name	Suzy	British Independent Film Award for Most Promising Newcomer
2013	Filth	Mary	
2013	uwantme2killhim?	Detective Inspector Sarah Clayton	
2013	Still Life	Kelly Stoke	
2016	Starfish	Nicola Ray	Producer
2016	A Street Cat Named Bob	Val	
2017	A Crooked Somebody	Chelsea Mills	
2017	Mary Shelley	Mary Jane Clairmont	
2017	Bob the Builder: Mega Machines	Wendy (voice)	US & UK releases
2018	One Last Thing	Jaime	
2019	Downton Abbey	Anna Bates	
2022	Downton Abbey: A New Era	Anna Bates	
2025	Downton Abbey: The Grand Finale	Anna Bates	

=== Television ===
Year	Title	Role	Notes
1996	The Bill	Kelly Martin	Episode: "Unlucky in Love"
1997–1998	Coronation Street	Zoe Tattersall	126 episodes
1999	Bad Girls	Rachel Hicks	4 episodes
1999	dinnerladies	Sigourney	Episode: "Catering"
2000	Nature Boy	Jenny Macalister	Miniseries, 3 episodes
2000	Other People's Children	Becky	2 episodes: "#1.2" and "#1.3"
2000	Lorna Doone	Lizzie Ridd	Television film
2001	A Touch of Frost	Anne	2 episodes: "Benefit of the Doubt", Parts 1 & 2
2001	Casualty	Lucy Curry	Episode: "Better Safe Than Sorry"
2002	Nice Guy Eddie	Mandy	Episode: "#1.2"
2002	Paradise Heights	Julia Sawyer	6 episodes
2002	The Stretford Wives	Dawn Richards	Television film
2003	Danielle Cable: Eyewitness	Danielle Cable	Television film Nominated—Royal Television Society Award for Best Actress
2003	Red Cap	Pte. Tracy Walters	Episode: "Crush"
2003	The Last Detective	Celia / Josie	Episode: "Pilot"
2004	Island at War	Angelique Mahy	Miniseries, 6 episodes
2006	Missing	Sybil Foster	2 episodes
2006	Life on Mars	Ruth Tyler	3 episodes
2006	See No Evil: The Moors Murders	Maureen Smith	2 episodes: "#1.1" and "#1.2"
2006	The Street	Kerry	Episode: "Sean and Yvonne"
2006	Rebus	Gail Maitland	Episode: "Strip Jack"
2007	Murder in the Outback	Joanne Lees	Television film
2008	Spooks: Code 9	Hannah	Episodes: "#1.1" and "#1.2"
2009	Moving On	Kellie	Episode: "Butterfly Effect"
2009	Robin Hood	Kate	11 episodes
2010	Identity	Jane Calshaw	Episode: "Chelsea Girl"
2010	The Royle Family	Saskia	Episode: "Joe's Crackers"
2010–2015	Downton Abbey	Anna Bates (née Smith)	52 episodes Golden Globe Award for Best Supporting Actress (2014); Screen Actors Guild Award for Outstanding Performance by an Ensemble in a Drama Series (2012, 2014, 2015); Nominated—Primetime Emmy Award for Outstanding Supporting Actress in a Drama Series (2012, 2014, 2015); Nominated—Screen Actors Guild Award for Outstanding Performance by an Ensemble in a Drama Series (2013)
2012	True Love	Ruth	Episode: "Nick"
2014	The Secrets	Lexie	Episode: "The Lie"
2014	Doc McStuffins	Florence Nightingale (voice)	Episode: "Let the Nightingale Sing"
2015–2018	Bob the Builder	Wendy (voice)	112 episodes
2016	Dark Angel	Mary Ann Cotton	2 episodes: "#1.1" and "#1.2"
2017–2020	Liar	Laura Nielson	Main role 12 episodes
2019	The Commons	Eadie Boulay	Main role Miniseries, 8 episodes
2021	Angela Black	Angela Black	Main role 6 episodes
2022	Sherwood	Sarah Vincent	3 episodes
2023	North Shore	Abigail Crawford	Main role 6 episodes
2023	Last Light	Elana Yeats	Main role Miniseries, 5 episodes
2024	Breathtaking	Dr. Abbey Henderson	Main role Miniseries, 3 episodes
2025–2026	MobLand	Jan Da Souza	Main role 10 episodes
TBA	The Magnificent Seven	Harriet Talbot	Main role

=== Radio ===
Year	Title	Role	Notes
2007	Solaris	Rheya	BBC Radio 4
2010	The Disappearance	Alice	BBC Radio 4
2014	The Extraordinary Adventures of G.A. Henty: In Freedom's Cause	Lady Marjory	
2014	Shirley	Caroline	BBC Radio 4

== Awards and nominations ==
Year	Awards	Category	Work	Result
2003	Royal Television Society Award	Best Actress	Danielle Cable: Eyewitness	Nominated
2010	British Independent Film Awards	Most Promising Newcomer	In Our Name	Won
2012	Primetime Emmy Awards	Outstanding Supporting Actress in a Drama Series	Downton Abbey	Nominated
2012	Screen Actors Guild Award	Outstanding Performance by an Ensemble in a Drama Series	Downton Abbey	Won
2012	Monte-Carlo Television Festival	Outstanding Actress	Downton Abbey	Nominated
2013	Screen Actors Guild Award	Outstanding Performance by an Ensemble in a Drama Series	Downton Abbey	Nominated
2014	Primetime Emmy Awards	Outstanding Supporting Actress in a Drama Series	Downton Abbey	Nominated
2014	Golden Globe Awards	Best Supporting Actress in a Series, Miniseries, or Television Film	Downton Abbey	Won
2014	Screen Actors Guild Award	Outstanding Performance by an Ensemble in a Drama Series	Downton Abbey	Won
2015	Primetime Emmy Awards	Outstanding Supporting Actress in a Drama Series	Downton Abbey	Nominated
2015	Screen Actors Guild Award	Outstanding Performance by an Ensemble in a Drama Series	Downton Abbey	Won
2015	Golden Globe Awards	Best Supporting Actress in a Series, Miniseries, or Television Film	Downton Abbey	Nominated
