= Marcia de Rousse =

American actress (1953–2023)

- Born: 1953; Doniphan, Missouri, U.S.
- Died: September 2, 2023 (aged 70); Altadena, California, U.S.
- Occupation: Actress
- Notable work: True Blood
- Height: 4 ft 4 in (132 cm)

Marcia de Rousse (1953 – September 2, 2023) was an American actress. She was known for her roles on True Blood, St. Elsewhere, The Fall Guy and Schooled.

Marcia DeRousse was an American actress and former English teacher, best known for playing Dr. Patricia Ludwig in the HBO TV series True Blood. She also appeared in shows such as St. Elsewhere and The Fall Guy, as well as films including Tiptoes and The Disappointments Room.

Born in 1953 in Doniphan, Missouri, USA. She graduated from the University of Missouri with degrees in drama, becoming a respected teacher in the Pasadena public school system while pursuing acting.

Born with dwarfism she was a prominent advocate for disabled actors and greater representation for others like her in entertainment.

De Rousse died in Altadena, California, on September 2, 2023, at the age of 70.
