= Mad Dogs (British TV series) =

British black comedy and psychological thriller television series

- Blu-ray cover art of the series.
- Genre: Drama
- Created by: Cris Cole
- Written by: Cris Cole
- Directed by: Adrian Shergold; James Hawes
- Starring: Max Beesley; Philip Glenister; John Simm; Marc Warren; Ben Chaplin
- Country of origin: United Kingdom
- Original language: English
- No. of series: 4
- No. of episodes: 14 (list of episodes)

Production
- Executive producers: Elaine Pyke; Andy Harries; Suzanne Mackie; Max Beesley; Philip Glenister; John Simm; Marc Warren
- Producer: Spencer Campbell
- Production locations: Majorca, Spain (series 1–2); Cape Town, South Africa (Series 3–4)
- Running time: 40-45 minutes
- Production companies: Left Bank Pictures; Palma Pictures

Original release
- Network: Sky1
- Release: 10 February 2011 – 29 December 2013

Mad Dogs is a British psychological thriller television series, written and created by Cris Cole, that began airing on Sky1 on 10 February 2011, and ended on 29 December 2013 after four series and 14 episodes. It is produced by Left Bank Pictures, and co-produced by Palma Pictures. The series stars John Simm, Marc Warren, Max Beesley, and Philip Glenister as four long-time and middle-aged friends getting together in a villa in Majorca to celebrate the early retirement of their friend Alvo (Ben Chaplin). After Alvo is murdered, the group find themselves caught up in the world of crime and police corruption.

After gaining interest from some terrestrial networks, the series was commissioned by British Sky Broadcasting. Filming took place on location throughout the island of Majorca in May 2010, and took around four million euros and 44 days to make. The main themes are friendship and growing older; Glenister said it is about ageing and "getting closer to death". Photographer David LaChapelle directed three 30-second advertisements for the series. Mad Dogs opened with 1.61 million viewers, the 17th highest rated programme ever for Sky1, and attracted positive reactions from critics. They noted similarities with British gangster films, more predominantly the 2000 film Sexy Beast.

== Series overview ==
=== Plot ===
Four middle-aged friends who have known each other since sixth form, Baxter (John Simm), Quinn (Philip Glenister), Rick (Marc Warren) and Woody (Max Beesley), get together for a holiday in Majorca at the villa of Alvo (Ben Chaplin), a mutual friend who became wealthy in the property business. Over time Alvo's behaviour becomes increasingly erratic, and he is later killed by a man in a Tony Blair mask for taking a drug boat the group used earlier. The four clean the boat to remove evidence of their presence, when they are mistaken for drug dealers and paid three million euros. Afterwards, the four learn from María (María Botto), a local detective, that they are caught up in a Serbian mafia drug smuggling operation. Using video camera footage of their holiday, Baxter learns the real perpetrators are corrupt police officers, including María and her superior Dominic (Tim Woodward). Alvo is revealed to be a part of the operation, and was murdered when he no longer wanted to take part in it. María later attempts to kill the four when employing scare tactics to make them part with the cash fails to work, but is shot to death by Quinn. The other three run over Dominic to save Quinn. They leave with the money and accidentally board a ferry to Ibiza (their intention is to go to Barcelona).

The four are being aided by local Ibizan Carmen (Leticia Dolera), who begins a relationship with Baxter. They soon realise they are still being hunted when their rental car explodes. Quinn is kidnapped by Mackenzie (David Warner), an elderly British expatriate who is revealed to be the leader of the drug operation. The four are forced to return the money in exchange for their lives. When they are €100 short from a speeding fine, Mackenzie makes the four produce fake ecstasy for a nightclub, at which point he allows them to return home with five million euros that were paid to them by the nightclub, though Carmen is left behind. Mackenzie tricks them into boarding a ferry for Morocco, where they are arrested and sent to a black site prison in the desert. After another attempt on their lives, they are informed that the drug operation was organised by the Central Intelligence Agency (CIA), who are using the operation to fund black operations, and as a result of the four's interference a kill contract is out against them. With assistance by the British government, they move to Cape Town, South Africa, to live new lives and identities to avoid CIA detection, though they are no longer allowed to contact each other or their families.

Two years later, Baxter is a self-employed lawyer, Quinn runs a bar, Rick is a drug dealer who is haunted by a Tikoloshe, and Woody buys black market medicine for local hospitals. Baxter learns that Mackenzie was shot to death, indicating that the CIA operation is shut down. Baxter finds Quinn, who is secretly in contact with Woody. After helping Rick escape after his arrest, the four reunite and enter a British Consulate, only to learn the kill order is still active. They later come across the home of Lazaro (Stanley Townsend), a retired CIA agent. He removes their names from the CIA hit list, but later attempts to kill them as revenge for María, who was a CIA agent herself. Mercedes (Jaime Winstone), who they previously met at the black site prison, kills Lazaro, saving them.

After the CIA clears them, they return to England to attend the wedding of Baxter's eldest daughter. Rick reveals he sold Alvo's villa and signed the others' name without permission. Although the others initially resent Rick for this, the four become wealthy as a result. Two months later they return to Cape Town to visit Quinn's villa, where Baxter and Carmen reunite. Meanwhile, Dominic tracks the four down and arrives with his gang, with all members wearing Blair masks. After initially evading the gang, Baxter accidentally kills Carmen, mistaking her for an assassin. The four drive to one of Rick's contacts at a beach, only to be surrounded and executed by the gang upon arrival. In a state of Limbo, their souls leave the beach. Baxter spots one of the assassins, who removes the Blair mask to reveal a sinister version of himself. Their car drives past an unfinished interchange, and it plunges, where the four would meet their end.

=== Themes ===
Mad Dogs centres on four friends who holiday in Majorca, though as time passes, their holiday soon turns into a labyrinthine nightmare of lies, deception, and murder. The primary theme for the series is friendship and "growing older." Philip Glenister elaborated, saying it is not about "a group of blokes hitting their 40s and having a jolly-up, that would have been boring" but is "an undercurrent of something a bit darker", and "about reaching a stage in life, looking at what you've achieved and where you go next, it's about how normal people deal with a certain situation and how they can implode".

== Cast ==
- John Simm as Lloyd Baxter
- Marc Warren as Rick Heston
- Max Beesley as Steve "Woody" Woods
- Philip Glenister as Quinn Paterson
- Ben Chaplin as Alvo
- María Botto as María
- Tomás Pozzi as "Tiny Blair"
- Eloise Joseph as Lottie
- Tim Woodward as Dominic
- David Warner as Mackenzie
- Leticia Dolera as Carmen
- Lola Cordon as Wheezy
- Vicente Diaz as Hector
- Luifer Rodriguez as Angelo
- Rob McMillan as Big Jock
- Jaime Winstone as Mercedes
- Stanley Townsend as Lazaro
- Nabil Elouahabi as Halim

== Production ==
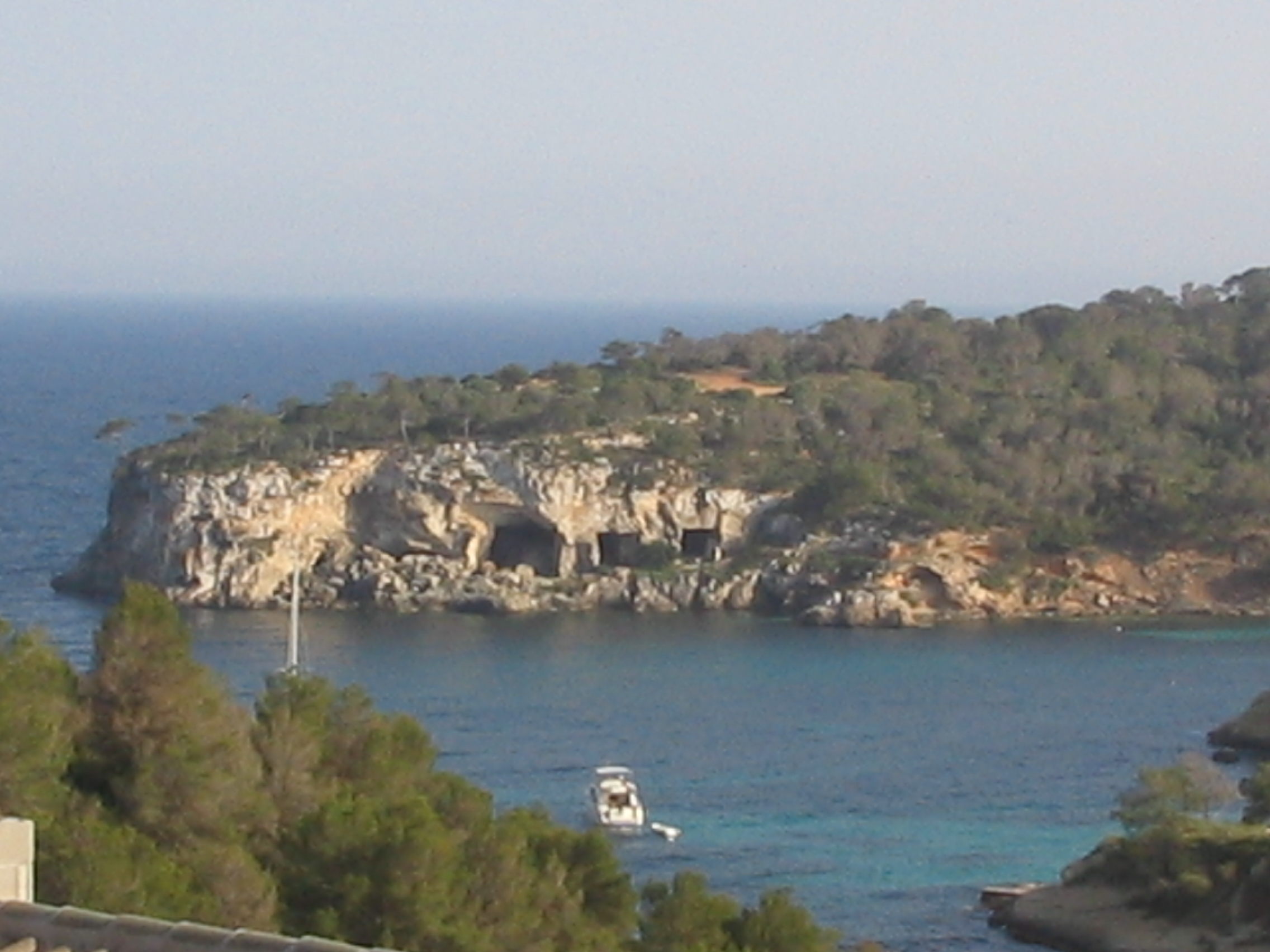
The series was filmed on location in Mallorca.

The idea behind Mad Dogs came from the friendship between the four main actors, who wanted to work together for a television project, as well as Cris Cole and executive producer Suzanne Mackie. The four initially wanted to make a story about a rock band, but decided that making programmes about bands have been "done to death". To write the series, Cole was influenced by the works of David Lynch and the Coen brothers as inspiration to the kind of storytelling that is "never quite what you think it is going to be".

The series initially gained interest from major terrestrial networks such as the BBC and ITV. However, Max Beesley and Philip Glenister grew frustrated with the comments from the commissioning teams from the networks. Glenister stated that "the problem with the BBC and ITV is more people coming in and telling you what to do; we are grown up and big enough to know where the boundaries are". They ultimately settled for Sky, as the network was "the one that we believed would let us do what we wanted". In January 2012, Glenister believed their decision to go with Sky was "vindicated", as the terrestrial networks would restrict its content, violence, and language. He stated that the restrictions would not make the series "the show it is and it wouldn't be the show we wanted to make". Head of Sky Drama Elaine Pyke had an immediate interest in the project, as she was "immediately grabbed by how thrilling, scary, and funny it is", believing it to be "the perfect show for Sky1". In a separate interview, Beesley stated: "Andy Harries basically put the show out to a few of the networks and Sky said, 'Here's the money, go and make it and we'll give you notes later on, but really do have the freedom to make it,' which is great, and there's not a lot of that happens nowadays."

Mad Dogs has got much more of a filmic quality to it. In a way, it doesn't feel as if we're making television.

— Philip Glenister describing the style of the series.

Mad Dogs was commissioned as a four-part series by Pyke, with the official announcement made in May 2010. Cole wrote the episodes. It was produced by Left Bank Pictures, the same production company responsible for other series including BBC One's Wallander and Sky1's Strike Back. It continues Sky's commitment to investing in new dramas with all-star casts. The series sees the return of John Simm and Philip Glenister, who previously worked together on the BBC One series Life on Mars. A casting note once went awry when "Tony Blair" (the armed man in a Tony Blair mask) was misspelled as "Tiny Blair". As a result, six dwarfs auditioned for the part, and one of them ended up being cast in the role. Filming began in May 2010 and took place on location in Majorca, over a period of 44 days. The series was budgeted at an estimated four million euros, with a further €150,000 grant from the Mallorcan Tourism Foundation, who hoped the series would promote Majorca, and was co-produced by Palma Pictures. In one scene, Glenister refused to go nude to shoot the four running to a swimming pool, citing his age. Half of the filming crew were locals. Beesley noted that the Spanish crew were "fantastic" and joked that the cast and British crew were given some half-days because of local involvement.

Plans were underway for a second series as early as January 2011. Citing ratings success for the first series, Sky officially renewed Mad Dogs for a second series of four episodes, which would also be written by Cris Cole. Beesley, Glenister, Simm, and Warren would reprise their roles, with filming taking place over summer 2011 and broadcast in January 2012. Sometime after the second series finished filming in August 2011, Sky commissioned a third series, which began filming in January 2012. A final two-part fourth series was commissioned in January 2013. The third series began airing in June 2013, and the fourth series finished filming in March 2013. On the same day as the last episode of series 3, there was a behind the scenes special called Behind The Madness, which aired on Sky 1. The final two-part fourth series aired on 28 December; the last part aired on 29 December, where the show concluded.

== Promotion ==
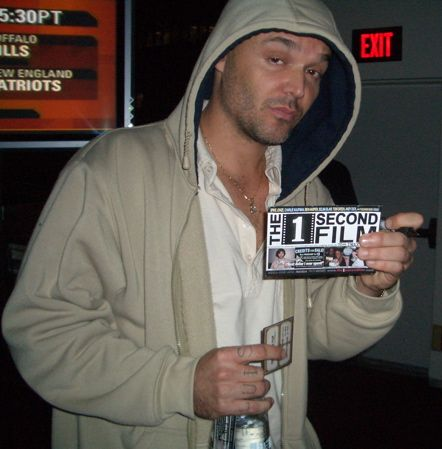
Photographer David LaChapelle directed three 30-second advertisements for the series.

Three 30-second films were produced to be used as on-air promotions for the programme on all Sky channels and selected third-party channels. The promotions starred the cast, directed by David LaChapelle and shot on location in Majorca. Print, outdoor and online promotions were also made. Executive creative director Clare McDonald was impressed by LaChapelle's work because the adverts were "staying true to our vision". Television promotions were first broadcast on Sky1 on 11 January 2011. On 28 January, a preview of the first two episodes were screened at the British Academy of Film and Television Arts (BAFTA) event in London. This was followed by a Q & A session by Marc Warren, Cris Cole, Suzanne Mackie, and Adrian Shergold.

== Release and reception ==
=== Broadcast and ratings ===
Scheduling of the series changed over the course of its development. The first announcement of the series in May 2010 stated it would be broadcast during the spring of 2011, but in August 2010 it was announced it would be moved forward to the autumn schedule, before it was finally decided to broadcast in February 2011. The series premiere received overnight ratings of 967,000 viewers and a 4 per cent audience share. It became the second largest multichannel audience of the night, behind a repeat of EastEnders on BBC Three, which was watched by 1.061 million viewers. The consolidated ratings for the first episode raised to 1.61 million viewers, giving the episode the second largest multichannel audience for that week, behind an episode of Glee on E4. Overnight ratings declined steadily to 802,000 by episode two, and 691,000 by episode three. The first series finale attracted 938,000 viewers. The first series became the eleventh most watched programme in Sky 1's history. The second series premiered on Sky1 on 19 January 2012.

=== Critical reception ===
Michael Deacon of The Daily Telegraph reacted positively towards the series, stating "episode one was enjoyably sinister. It was also, once or twice, quite amusing, in (of course) a blokey way." Deacon liked the beginning of the pilot where the main characters record a video message, stating "this is what Mad Dogs did well – like any competent suspense thriller, it made you ask questions throughout. The episode bubbled with foreboding, right up to the cliffhanger." Deacon also noted at the cliffhanger that "the most disturbing sight wasn't the shower of blood but the gunman's rubber mask, which was of a grinning Tony Blair." John Crace of The Guardian was more mixed, starting "after unsuccessfully fobbing us off with endless series of Ross Kemp looking macho, Sky is now throwing serious money at getting viewers to watch something other than sport." Crace was critical of the set up of the episode, stating "I'm all for allowing a drama time to breathe but we didn't really need a whole hour just to establish that Alvo was a bit dodgy and that the four others had complications in their lives. Rather than building menace, the snail-like pace dissipated it," However, he reacted positively towards the end, as "things did eventually look up," adding "there's hope for Mad Dogs yet."

Jane Simon of the Daily Mirror believed the "setting and the gangsterish plot are both reminiscent of that great British movie Sexy Beast, and this first instalment of the four-part series presses all the right buttons," adding "it has naturalistic performances, an effortless blend of comedy and sinister undertones plus rather more shots of Marc Warren's bum cheeks than might be considered absolutely necessary." Ben Walsh of The Independent rated the series three stars out of five, having written "there's far too much exposition, a very daft plot, some risible dialogue and yet Sky's ripe four-parter is horribly compelling," and added "it's extremely silly, but Simm and Glenister are always compelling and they make this gamey tale of gangsters, police corruption and 'friendship' work." Reviewing the first two episode, The Stage believed the first was "a slow-burning exploration" and "all very intriguing and disturbing, with a great performance by Chaplin as the smilingly psychotic host." The reviewer criticised the death of Alvo, as he was considered the most "compelling character" and since "sent the plot line spinning off into less original territory," adding the producers took ideas from crime capers such as Sexy Beast and Shallow Grave. The reviewer added "what Mad Dogs lacks in originality it makes up for in energy, verve and humour. The dialogue positively crackles with great lines." In the end, the reviewer stated that Mad Dogs "may be an unapologetic crowd pleaser, but it is a finely made one, with excellent performances from a dream cast. It also offers the only opportunity I have of seeing blue skies, azure waters and sunshine in February, so I am in for the duration."

Ryan Lambie of Den of Geek said of the first episode; "In terms of writing and acting, Mad Dogs is good, but not perfect, and much of its knock-about banter is uncannily like any Brit gangster flick you've ever seen," like "Sexy Beast: the series." However Lambie noted "when events push its premise from naff lads' drama into exotic thriller, Mad Dogs gets infinitely better, and if nothing else, it keeps you guessing. As the series progressed, Lambie noted that Mad Dogs was "developing into a nifty TV thriller with an engaging sense of the absurd. Writer, Cris Cole, enjoys picking holes in his characters' machismo as the tension mounts, and the strange billboard posters dotted all over the sun-scorched island, which say "Yenda a ninguna parte," ("Going nowhere") are perhaps a foreshadowing of their imminent fate." Lambie was disappointed at the ending, calling it "unexpectedly flat," adding "the major plot twist that the previous three-or-so hours appeared to allude to never arrives, [...] I couldn't help but feel that, as the closing credits rolled on the whole saga, the tension and intrigue that had gradually built up in previous weeks had been allowed to slip away.

=== Home media release ===
The first series of Mad Dogs was released on DVD and Blu-ray Disc in the United Kingdom on 7 March 2011, and on DVD in Australia on 3 May 2012. The second series was released only DVD in the UK on 12 March 2012, along with a collectors boxset containing both series. The third series was released on 1 July 2013, and the fourth series was released on 13 January 2014. On the same date the complete boxset of all four series was also released. All sets from the UK are released with a "15" British Board of Film Classification (BBFC) certificate, indicating that it is unsuitable for viewers under the age of 15 years.

=== Award nominations ===
Mad Dogs was nominated for the British Academy Television Award for Best Serial Drama at the 2011 ceremony but lost out to the Channel 4 series Any Human Heart. In 2012 it was nominated for a Broadcast Award for Best Drama Series or Serial, but lost to the ITV1 period drama Downton Abbey.

=== Spin-off series and U.S. adaptation ===
In November 2011, as the third series was in production, Left Bank was in the stages of developing a spin-off series, Mad Cats, which would feature a similar storyline but for "an equally glossy female brand with a cast of the calibre of John Simm and Philip Glenister."

In November 2012, American writer and producer Shawn Ryan announced in an interview for the Kevin Pollak Online Chat Show, that he was working with Cole to develop a planned American adaptation of Mad Dogs. Later, in March 2013, the American cable channel FX picked up the adaptation, which will be produced by Left Bank and Sony Pictures Television. The series would follow a similar storyline to the original, though the setting would be changed to Belize.

On 15 January 2015, Amazon Studios released a pilot episode of the American adaptation along with their 4th season of new pilots. The adaptation was written by original series creator and writer Cris Cole, who has also signed on for the whole series if it is commissioned. Also, The Shield creator Shawn Ryan joined Cole as an executive producer on the pilot episode. The series stars Michael Imperioli, Billy Zane, Steve Zahn, and Romany Malco, as well as Ben Chaplin, who appeared in the British Mad Dogs series in the role of Alvo, played by Zane in the US series. The pilot episode is 55 minutes long and has been rated 18, compared to the 15 rating provided to the original series. The American pilot also ends at a different point to the original.

The pilot led to a 10-episode full season that began airing on 21 January 2016, although the promotional release date was slated for the following day. On 28 February 2016 Mad Dogs executive producer Shawn Ryan announced that the series would not be renewed for a second season and instead concluded its 10-episode run as a limited series.
