= He Kills Coppers =

2013 British series

- Genre: Crime drama
- Written by: Ed Whitmore
- Directed by: Adrian Shergold
- Starring: Mel Raido; Liam Garrigan; Rafe Spall; Steven Robertson; Kelly Reilly; Maureen Lipman
- Composer: Ben Bartlett
- Country of origin: United Kingdom
- Original language: English
- No. of series: 1
- No. of episodes: 3

Production
- Executive producers: Robert Bernstein; Douglas Rae
- Producer: David Boulter
- Cinematography: David Odd
- Running time: 60 minutes
- Production company: Ecosse Films

Original release
- Network: ITV
- Release: 23 March – 6 April 2008

He Kills Coppers is a three-part television drama, broadcast on ITV between 23 March and 6 April 2008. The drama stars Mel Raido, Liam Garrigan and Rafe Spall, and involves the death of three police officers during the celebrations of the 1966 World Cup. The story explores the three men most connected with the deaths. The drama is based on the best-selling novel by Jake Arnott. The series was subsequently released on DVD on 7 April 2008.

== Cast ==
- Mel Raido as Billy Porter
- Liam Garrigan as Jonathan Young
- Rafe Spall as Frank Taylor
- Steven Robertson as Tony Meehan
- Tim Woodward as Nipper Reid
- Kelly Reilly as Jeannie
- Paul Ritter as Sid Franks
- John Joseph as Jimmy
- Cavan Clerkin as Stan
- Lucy Holt as Sandra
- James Dreyfus as Julian
- Frank Harper as DI Ernie Franklin
- Maureen Lipman as Lily Porter
- Ben Cartwright as DC Mickey Parks
- Simon Snashall as DS Reg Wilson
- Arthur Darvill as PC Wallis

== Episodes ==
No.	Title	Directed by	Written by	Original release date	UK viewers (millions)
1	"Episode 1"	Adrian Shergold	Ed Whitmore	23 March 2008	4.06
The fates of a detective, a journalist and a villain are inextricably linked when the 1966 summer of World Cup euphoria is shattered by the slaying of three policemen.
2	"Episode 2"	Adrian Shergold	Ed Whitmore	30 March 2008	Under 3.41
Billy Porter goes on the run and reporter Tony Meehan is in demand as the acknowledged expert on the `cop killer', while Frank Taylor grows closer to Jon Young's widow Jeannie. Five years later Billy is still free and has forged a new life for himself, but Frank's life is blighted by his failure to capture the villain, and Tony's personal obsession has earned him a reputation as a crank.
3	"Episode 3"	Adrian Shergold	Ed Whitmore	6 April 2008	Under 3.27
Nearly 20 years after the killings, Frank has managed to attain the rank of DCI, but finds that promotion is no guarantee of fulfilment. Spurred into renewed action by the disappearance of journalist Tony Meehan, he finally manages to locate Billy - who senses the game is almost over and arms himself in readiness, determined to end it on his own terms.
