= Danielle Cable: Eyewitness =

2003 British television film

- Genre: Crime drama
- Written by: Kate Brooke; Terry Winsor
- Directed by: Adrian Shergold
- Starring: Joanne Froggatt; Bill Paterson; Lindsey Coulson; Jamie Foreman; Nigel Terry; Eamon Boland; Alex Hassell; Tilly Vosburgh; Jennifer Hennessy; Mark Letheren
- Composer: Nick Bicât
- Country of origin: United Kingdom
- Original language: English

Production
- Executive producer: Jeff Pope
- Producer: Francis Hopkinson
- Cinematography: David Odd
- Editor: Tony Cranstoun
- Running time: 90 minutes
- Production company: Granada Television

Original release
- Network: ITV
- Release: 14 April 2003

Danielle Cable: Eyewitness is a British television true crime drama film, based upon the murder of Stephen Cameron by Kenneth Noye in a road rage incident in 1996. The film was co-written for television by playwrights Kate Brooke and Terry Winsor, and was directed by Adrian Shergold. It was first broadcast on ITV on 14 April 2003. The film details the events following the killing, in which the sole witness to the murder, Cameron's fiancée Danielle Cable (Joanne Froggatt), is forced to change her identity and go into hiding after giving evidence which helped convict Noye in court.

The film was screened on the third anniversary of Noye's conviction for Stephen's murder, which occurred on 14 April 2000. Prior to filming, Froggatt met with the real-life Danielle Cable in a secret location, while under the protection of two bodyguards who prevented Danielle from revealing any information that might lead to her being found. Frogatt was later nominated for the Royal Television Society Award for Best Actress for her role as Cable, and the film itself was also nominated for the BAFTA TV Award for Best Single Drama. The film drew 8.59 million viewers on its debut broadcast. Notably, it has never been available on DVD, although it is available on YouTube.

== Criticism ==
Stephen Cameron's parents, Toni and Ken, criticised the film following its broadcast, commenting; "We have seen it. There were loads of inaccuracies. In principle, I think it's a story that needed to be told, but Toni came across as hysterical and as a wimp, but she is a very strong person. We had no input whatsoever and we would have liked to have been contacted. At the end of the day it was our son, and Danielle lived with us for a long time."

== Cast ==
- Joanne Froggatt as Danielle Cable
- Bill Paterson as DI Nick Biddiss
- Lindsey Coulson as Ann Cable
- Jamie Foreman as Keith Phelan
- Nigel Terry as Kenneth Noye
- Eamon Boland as Ken Cameron
- Alex Hassell as Stephen Cameron
- Tilly Vosburgh as Toni Cameron
- Jennifer Hennessy as DS Libby Marks
- Mark Letheren as DC Jason Wheeler
- Tim Woodward Jeff Mundy
- Paul Jesson as Brian Boyce
- Stephanie Leonidas as Kerri
- Kim Taylforth as Brenda Noye
- Chris Geere as Josh Harman
- Michael McKell as Terry Cable
- Connor McIntyre as Steve Allan
- Caroline Pegg as Sylvia Chapman
- Phil Kavanagh as Paul Scobie
- Vincent John as Dave John
- James Rawlinson as Tom Adams
- Shane O'Connor as Michael Cable
- Anton Lesser as Henry Batten
