= Tim Woodward =

English actor (1953–2023)

- Woodward in 1974
- Born: Timothy Oliver Woodward; 24 April 1953; Kensington, London, England
- Died: 9 November 2023 (aged 70)
- Occupation: Actor
- Years active: 1974–2023
- Parent(s): Edward Woodward; Venetia Barrett
- Relatives: Peter Woodward (brother); Sarah Woodward (sister)

Timothy Oliver Woodward (24 April 1953 – 9 November 2023) was an English actor. His credits included Galileo (1975), Piece of Cake (1988), Families, Heartbeat, The Europeans (1979), Tales of the Unexpected (1982), Salomè (1986), Personal Services (1987) The Scarlet Letter (1995), Prime Suspect (1995), Wide-Eye (2003–2022), Pierrepoint: The Last Hangman (2005), Space Race (2005), Agatha Christie's Poirot (2006), Nuremberg: Nazis on Trial (2006), The Fattest Man in Britain (2009), Mad Dogs (2011–2013), Fleming: The Man Who Would Be Bond (2014), Houdini (2014), London Has Fallen (2016), Criminal (2016), Genius (2017), Beast (2017), The Marine 6: Close Quarters (2018), Peaky Blinders (2019), and Radioactive (2019).

== Early life and education ==
Timothy Oliver Woodward, was born in Kensington, London, on 24 April 1953, the son of actors Edward Woodward and Venetia Collett (who used the stage name Barrett). His siblings included Peter Woodward and Sarah Woodward, both also actors.

He was educated at Haileybury and Imperial Service College, Hertford Heath, Hertfordshire, then studied acting at RADA, graduating in 1974 with an Acting (RADA Diploma).

== Career ==
Woodward's career started in 1975, playing Ludovico Marsili in the Joseph Losey film Galileo (1975). His breakthrough role came in 1977 as Royal Flying Corps pilot Sergeant Alan Farmer in the BBC drama Wings (1977). This was followed by his starring as the by-the-book Royal Air Force pilot Squadron Leader Rex in Piece of Cake (1988).

During the 1990s Woodward made an appearance in the Granada Television soap opera Families, as well as taking the role of gamekeeper Walter Gillies in Yorkshire Television's long-running 1960s drama Heartbeat. A further appearance in Heartbeat came in the 2008 episode Out of the Long, Dark Night, in which he played James Knight, a former army officer.

Woodward appeared in the 2000s ITV police drama Murder City, and also portrayed Leonard "Nipper" Read of Scotland Yard in the 2008 ITV adaptation of Jake Arnott's crime novel He Kills Coppers. He guest-starred with his father Edward and son Sam as a London gangster family in a special storyline for The Bill in 2008. Also, he appeared with his father Edward in the American television series The Equalizer, in the season four episode "Prisoners of Conscience" in which he played Robert McCall's father in a flashback scene.

Woodward was also known by younger audiences for his audio narration in the children's television show Wide-Eye.

== Personal life and death ==
Woodward married Amanda Smith in 1997. They had two sons and a daughter. He also had a son from an earlier relationship with the actress Jan Chappell, and a daughter with Kate Barnwell.

Tim Woodward died of cancer on 9 November 2023, at the age of 70. He was survived by his wife and five children.

== Filmography ==
=== Film ===
- 1975: Galileo – Ludovico Marsili
- 1979: The Europeans – Felix Young
- 1985: King David – Joab
- 1986: Salomè – Nerva
- 1987: Personal Services – Timms
- 1995: The Scarlet Letter – Brewster Stonehall
- 1996: Some Mother's Son – Harrington
- 1997: The House of Angelo – William Angelo
- 1997: Homeboy (Short) – Father
- 1998: B. Monkey – Frank Rice
- 2002: K-19: The Widowmaker – Partonov
- 2005: Pierrepoint: The Last Hangman – Governor of Holloway
- 2005: The Importance of Blind Dating (Short) – Chris Anders
- 2006: A Midsummer Night's Rewrite (Short) – Shakespeare
- 2007: Flight of Fury (Video) – Admiral Pendleton
- 2007: Maude (Short) – Danny
- 2007: Lady Jane (Short) – Sir John Brydges
- 2008: Stiletto (Short) – The Executive
- 2016: London Has Fallen – General
- 2016: Criminal – Roderick Armstrong
- 2017: Beast – Fletcher Huntingdon
- 2018: The Marine 6: Close Quarters – Tommy Walker
- 2019: Heard from Above (Short) – Anthony
- 2019: Radioactive – Alexandre Millerand
- 2020: Denmark – Idris
- 2020: The Codfather (Short) – Don

=== Television ===
Tim Woodward television credits
Year	Title	Role	Notes	Ref.
1975	Play for Today	Storyteller	Episode: “By Common Consent”	
1975	Within These Walls	Richard Wiltshire	Episode: “Mother's Girl”	
1975	Prometheus: The Life of Balzac	Eugene Surville	TV miniseries, 2 episodes	
1975-1976	Play of the Month	Kit Neilan / Pip Thompson	2 episodes	
1976	The Expert	Det. Sgt. Hallet	BBC, Episode: “Suspicious Death”	
1977	The Cost of Loving	Harry West	Episode: “The Human Element”	
1977–1978	Wings	Sgt. Alan Farmer	BBC, 24 episodes	
1981	BBC2 Playhouse	William Patrick	Episode: “Journal of Bridget Hitler”	
1982	Q.E.D.	Harry Owsley	Episode: “The Great Motor Race”	
1982	Tales of the Unexpected	Timothy Burton	Episode: "Decoy"	
1982	Frost in May	Richard Crayshaw	Episode: “Beyond the Glass”	
1982	Cousin Phillis	Edward Holdsworth	4 episodes	
1982	East Lynne	Frances Levison	TV movie	
1983	The Irish R.M.	Bernard Shute	Episode: “A Misdeal”	
1983	American Playhouse	Billy	3 episodes	
1983	Spooky	Peter	Episode: “The Keeper”	
1983	Agatha Christie's Partners in Crime	Lawrence St. Vincent	Episode: “The Affair of the Pink Pearl”	
1983	The Case of the Frightened Lady	Lord Willie Lebanon	TV movie	
1984	Crown Court	Brian Bass	3 episodes	
1984	All the World's a Stage	Quotations Reader	Episode: “The Actors Do Not Understand”	
1984	Pope John Paul II	Juliusz Kydrynski	TV movie	
1984	Father's Day	Rex Ferguson	Episode: “Affairs in Order”	
1985-1990	Theatre Night	Lord Windermere / Menelaos	2 episodes	
1987	A Killing on the Exchange	John Field	TV miniseries	
1988	Piece of Cake	Squadron Leader Rex	TV miniseries	
1989	Passion and Paradise	Godfrey Higgs	TV miniseries	
1989	The Equalizer	William McCall	Episode: "Prisoners of Conscience"	
1990	Traitors	Thomas Percy	TV movie	
1990-1991	Families	John Thompson	4 episodes	
1992	Absolutely Fabulous	Headmaster Tony	BBC, Episode: "ISO Tank”	
1993	The Good Guys	Peter Henderson	Episode: "All That Sparkles”	
1993	Closing Numbers	Keith	TV movie	
1994	Pie in the Sky	D.C. Ken Shipley	Episode: "The Truth Will Out”	
1994	MacGyver: Lost Treasure of Atlantis	Col. Petrovic	TV movie	
1995	Go Back Out	Dad	TV movie	
1995	Prime Suspect	George Marlow	Episode: "The Scent of Darkness"	
1996	Heartbeat	Walter Gillies	Episode: "Old Colonials"	
1996	The Governor	Mr. Turnbull	3 episodes	
1997	The Ruth Rendell Mysteries	Nick Hawthorne	2 episodes	
1997	David	Angry Lieutenant	TV movie	
1997	Bramwell	Aubrey Savier	Episode #3.2	
1997	Holding On	Ken	6 episodes	
1998	Heat of the Sun	Lord Harry Ellesmere	Episode: “Private Lives”	
1998	The Bill	Carl Bassett	Episode: "Home Movie"	
1998	Space Island One	Mr. Hawkspur	Episode: “Sarcophagus”	
1998	Vanity Fair	Mr. John Osborne	TV miniseries, 4 episodes	
1999	The Colour of Justice	Conor Taafe / Ian Johnston	TV movie	
1999	RKO 281	Jack L. Warner	TV movie	
2000	The Vice	Trevor Nashe	2 episodes	
2000	Blue Murder	Ben Francombe	TV movie	
2000	In Defence	Tom Downing	Episode #1.1	
2001	Silent Witness	Howard Considine	Episodes: "Faith, Part 1", "Faith, Part 2"	
2001	Murder Rooms: Mysteries of the Real Sherlock Holmes	Rhodes	Episode: "The Photographer's Chair"	
2002	Outside the Rules	Martin Tindal	TV miniseries	
2003	New Tricks	Donald Bevan	Episode: "The Chinese Job"	
2003	The Second Coming	Chief Constable Richard Tanner	TV miniseries	
2003	Danielle Cable: Eyewitness	Jeff Mundy	TV movie	
2003	Crossroads	Bishop Black	3 episodes	
2003	Midsomer Murders	Timothy Webster	Episode: "The Green Man"	
2004-2006	Murder City	DCI Sebastian Turner	10 episodes	
2005	William and Mary	John Castlemaigne	Episode #3.1	
2005	Murphy's Law	Adcock	Episode: "The Goodbye Look"	
2005	Space Race	Mitrofan Nedelin	2 episodes	
2006	Rosemary & Thyme	Ollie	Episode: "Three Legs Good"	
2006	Agatha Christie's Poirot	Enoch Arden / Charles	Episode: "Taken at the Flood"	
2006	Vital Signs	Dr Delaney	TV miniseries; episode #1.5	
2006	Nuremberg: Nazis on Trial	John Amen	TV miniseries	
2007	Clapham Junction	Man on Bench	TV movie	
2008	He Kills Coppers	Nipper Reid	TV movie	
2008	The Bill	Roger Hutton	2 episodes	
2008	Heartbeat	James Knight	Episode: "Out of the Long, Dark Night"	
2009	Hunter	DS Jim MacAulay	TV miniseries; episode #1.2	
2009	Casualty 1909	DSI Hatton	Episode #1.1	
2009	The Fattest Man in Britain	Morley Raisin	TV movie	
2010	Doctors	Inspector Stuart Morten	Episode: "Reckless"	
2010	Any Human Heart	Admiral Godfrey	TV miniseries; episode #1.2	
2011	Spooks (MI-5)	Peter Reddon	Episode #10.3	
2011	Without You	Hugo Livingstone	TV miniseries	
2011–2013	Mad Dogs	Dominic	6 episodes	
2013	Mr Selfridge	Musker	4 episodes	
2014	Fleming: The Man Who Would Be Bond	Air Chief Marshal 'Bomber' Harris	TV miniseries; episode #1.3	
2014	Houdini	Sheriff John	TV miniseries; Part 1	
2015	Jekyll and Hyde	Sir Marion Carew	4 episodes	
2017	Decline and Fall	Prison Medical Officer	TV miniseries; episode #1.3	
2017	Genius	Magistrate König	Episode: "Einstein. Chapter Seven"	
2018	Vera	Brian Delaney	Episode: "Home"	
2019	Peaky Blinders	Lord Suckerby	Episode: "Black Tuesday"	
2019	Casualty	Vincent Millbank	2 episodes	
2021	Agatha Raisin	Fred Instick	Episode: "Kissing Christmas Goodbye"	

=== Audio ===
Year	Title	Role	Notes
2000-2001	Yoho Ahoy	Narrator	
2003	Wide-Eye	Narrator	
2011	The Colditz Story	Narrator	
2012	Red and Blue	Lieutenant Colonel Bradley Shoreham	
