= Adrian Shergold =

British film and television director

Adrian Shergold (born 24 March 1948 in Croydon, Surrey) is a British film and television director.

== Selected filmography ==
- Pierrepoint (2005)
- Funny Cow (2017)
- Cordelia (2019)
- Denmark (2019)

== Selected television ==
- Christabel (1988)
- Holding On (1997)
- Eureka Street (1999)
- The Second Coming (2003)
- Danielle Cable: Eyewitness (2003)
- Dirty Filthy Love (2004)
- Ahead of the Class (2005)
- Persuasion (2007)
- Clapham Junction (2007)
- He Kills Coppers (2008)
- Mad Dogs (2011)
- Vera (2011)
- Lucan (2013)
- My Mother and Other Strangers (2016)

== Selected theatre ==
- Chorus Girls (1981)
