= Suzanne Mackie =

British producer

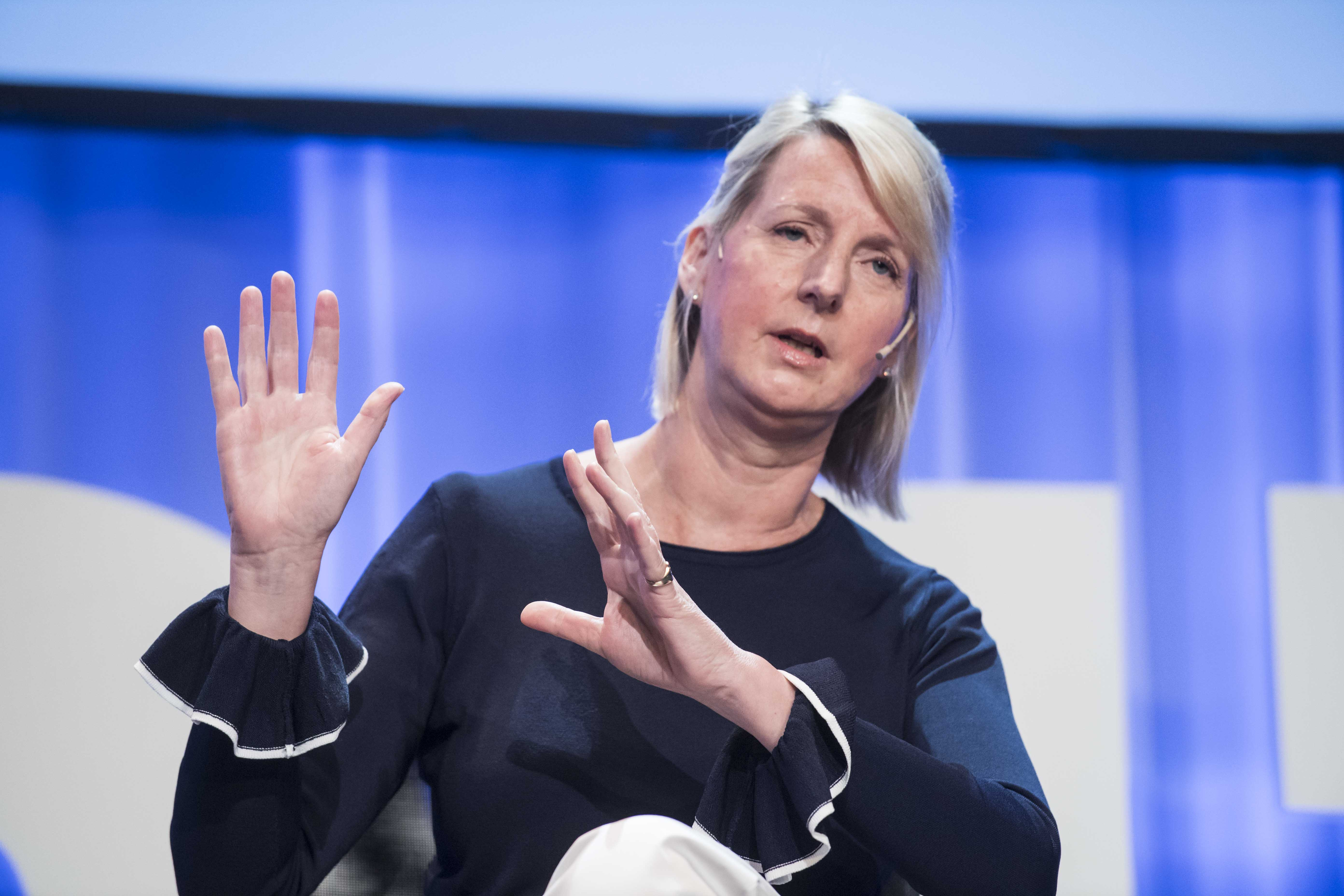
- Mackie in 2017
- Occupation: Producer
- Years active: 1997–present

Suzanne Mackie is a British film and television producer.

== Biography ==
Mackie worked for BBC Drama Serials before becoming a development executive at Harbour Pictures. With Harbour, she produced Nigel Cole's Calendar Girls (2003) and Julian Jarrold's Kinky Boots (2005). In 2009, she joined Left Bank Pictures as head of film, and was promoted to creative director in 2012. She departed Left Bank to start her own production company, Orchid Pictures, in 2020. That year, the company entered into an agreement with Netflix to produce films and television series exclusively for the platform. She resides in London.

== Filmography ==
=== Film ===
Year	Title	Notes	Ref.
2003	Calendar Girls	Producer	
2005	Kinky Boots	Producer	
2012	All in Good Time	Producer	
2017	Dark River	Executive producer	
2020	Misbehaviour	Producer	

=== Television ===
Year	Title	Notes	Ref.
2011–2013	Mad Dogs	11 episodes; producer and executive producer	
2015–2016	Mad Dogs	10 episodes; producer and executive producer	
2016–2023	The Crown	60 episodes; executive producer	
2017	The Replacement	3 episodes; executive producer	
2018	Origin	10 episodes; executive producer	
2021	Behind Her Eyes	6 episodes; executive producer	
2026	Agatha Christie's Seven Dials	Executive producer	
TBA	The Boys from Brazil	Executive producer	

== Awards and nominations ==
Award	Year	Category	Nominated work	Result	Ref.
British Academy Scotland Awards	2017	Best Television Scripted	The Replacement	Won	
British Academy Television Awards	2011	Best Drama Serial	Mad Dogs	Nominated	
British Academy Television Awards	2020	Best Drama Series	The Crown	Nominated	
British Academy Television Awards	2021	Best Drama Series	The Crown	Nominated	
Broadcasting Press Guild Awards	2012	Best Multichannel Programme	Mad Dogs	Won	
Primetime Emmy Awards	2017	Outstanding Drama Series	The Crown	Nominated	
Primetime Emmy Awards	2018	Outstanding Drama Series	The Crown	Nominated	
Primetime Emmy Awards	2020	Outstanding Drama Series	The Crown	Nominated	
Primetime Emmy Awards	2021	Outstanding Drama Series	The Crown	Won	
Primetime Emmy Awards	2023	Outstanding Drama Series	The Crown	Nominated	
Primetime Emmy Awards	2024	Outstanding Drama Series	The Crown	Nominated	
Producers Guild of America Awards	2018	Outstanding Producer of Episodic Television, Drama	The Crown	Nominated	
Producers Guild of America Awards	2020	Outstanding Producer of Episodic Television, Drama	The Crown	Nominated	
Producers Guild of America Awards	2021	Outstanding Producer of Episodic Television, Drama	The Crown	Won	
Producers Guild of America Awards	2024	Outstanding Producer of Episodic Television, Drama	The Crown	Nominated	
Royal Television Society Programme Awards	2018	Special Recognition	The Crown	Won	
