= In Our Name =

2010 British drama film

- Directed by: Brian Welsh
- Written by: Brian Welsh
- Produced by: Daniel Chamier; Michelle Eastwood; Ailsa Ferrier
- Starring: Joanne Froggatt
- Cinematography: Sam Care
- Edited by: Hazel Baillie
- Music by: Stuart Earl
- Production companies: A10 Films; Escape Films; BBC Films
- Distributed by: Curzon Artificial Eye
- Release date: 10 December 2010
- Running time: 90 minutes
- Language: English

In Our Name is a 2010 British drama film written and directed by Brian Welsh. It follows a female soldier (played by Joanne Froggatt) who has returned from serving in Iraq and her struggle to adjust back into everyday life. Froggatt won Most Promising Newcomer for her performance in the film at the 13th British Independent Film Awards.

== Plot ==
Suzy Jackson (Froggatt) is a private returning from service in Iraq during the Iraq War to be reunited with husband and fellow soldier Mark (Mel Raido) and young daughter Cassie (Chloe Jayne Wilkinson) in North East England. Suffering from recurring nightmares related to her experiences while on tour and displaying paranoid behaviour, Suzy distances herself from her husband and tells her army superiors that she is fine aside from some insomnia due to jet lag.

Confused by her rejection of his affections, Mark begins to suspect that Suzy is having an affair with one of her fellow squaddies, his suspicions focussing on Paul (Andrew Knott). Paul and Suzy do a presentation for some school children arranged by Suzy's teacher sister Marie (Janine Leigh). At this presentation Suzy reveals her feelings of guilt over the death of an Iraqi girl who was executed by local militia for accepting a bag of sweets offered to her by Suzy.

Concerned about Suzy's state of mind, Paul visits her house to talk to her and she expresses her wish to keep Cassie safe in a way that she failed to do with the Iraqi girl. Mark returns to the house and discovering the pair deep in conversation confronts Paul and threatens him off, beforehand showing him grisly mementos of his own tours in Iraq that he has stored in his garage. He then discovers that Suzy has moved Cassie's bed into their bedroom "for safety", which he believes to be a ruse to avoid intimacy with him and so accuses her of having an affair.

Suzy and Mark go drinking with friends at their local working men's club and Paul turns up, pleading with Suzy to get counselling and to leave Mark, whom he confronts and accuses of being a psychopath before being bundled out of the club. In the taxi home, Mark picks an argument with the Muslim driver by making racist remarks. Subsequently their house is daubed in anti-British graffiti, an incident that is witnessed by Cassie, who wakes her father, but missed by Suzy who has taken sleeping pills. In retaliation, Mark and his friends contrive to lure the driver to a location where they, along with Suzy, beat him and record the attack on video.

Further disturbed by the ferocity of the beating that Mark gave the taxi driver and having discovered the stash of mementos previously seen by Paul, Suzy takes Cassie and goes on the run to South Shields, armed with a pistol that she has taken from her army base. The pair camp out in some woodland with Suzy again taking pills to help her sleep. As a result, Cassie awakens first and starts playing with the pistol, Suzy only being woken when her daughter accidentally discharges it.

The incident persuades Suzy that her actions are not contributing to Cassie's safety, and they return home.

== Main cast ==
| Actor | Role |
|---|---|
| Joanne Froggatt | Private Suzy Jackson |
| Mel Raido | Mark Jackson |
| Chloe Jayne Wilkinson | Cassie Jackson |
| Andrew Knott | Paul |
| Janine Leigh | Marie |
| Drew Horsley | Tony |
| John Henshaw | Frank |
| Anna Maria Gascoigne | Sandra |
| Bill Fellows | Dr. Tennant |
| Shah Amin | Taxi driver |
| Begun Coskun | Iraqi girl |
| Rob Just | Ten pin bowling server |

== Reception ==
The film received mixed reviews from critics. Froggatt’s performance won universal praise, but opinions on the film as a whole were more variable.

Time Out gave the film four stars out of five, describing it as Welsh’s “promising second film” with which he “proves himself a name to watch.” Digital Spy was similarly positive, also giving the film four stars and calling it “a convincing and fairly devastating character piece”.

Despite praising Froggatt’s “powerful performance”, The Guardian was less positive, awarding the film only two stars and with reviewer Peter Bradshaw reporting that it “starts interestingly, but resorts to clichés” and ultimately “delivers less than it promises”. Little White Lies were similarly critical, describing the film as “a weak and dubious antidote to the pro-forces detritus that is usually found on screen” and “passable but flawed”. Empire also gave the film a two star rating, noting Froggatt’s “standout performance” but also that “Welsh's attempt to tackle the brutal realities of post-traumatic stress is hampered by over-scripted dialogue and an uncomfortable mid-film shift into thriller mode”.

== Awards and nominations ==
| Year | Award/Festival | Category | Nominee(s) | Result |
|---|---|---|---|---|
| 2010 | 54th BFI London Film Festival | Best British Newcomer | Michelle Stein & Brian Welsh | Nominated |
| 2010 | 13th British Independent Film Awards | Most Promising Newcomer | Joanne Froggatt | Won |
| 2010 | 13th British Independent Film Awards | Best Achievement in Production | Brian Welsh | Nominated |
| 2011 | 35th Montreal World Film Festival | Golden Zenith | Brian Welsh | Won |
