= Starfish (2016 film) =

2016 film

- Directed by: Bill Clark
- Written by: Bill Clark
- Produced by: Pippa Cross; Joanne Froggatt; Ros Hubbard; Mel Paton
- Starring: Tom Riley; Joanne Froggatt
- Production companies: CrossDay Productions Ltd.; Unlimited Pictures
- Distributed by: Munro Film Services
- Release date: 28 October 2016
- Running time: 95 minutes
- Country: United Kingdom
- Language: English

Starfish is a 2016 British drama film written and directed by Bill Clark and starring Tom Riley and Joanne Froggatt. Based on a true story, the film follows a family who are thrown into turmoil when the husband contracts sepsis.

Principal photography began on 4 December 2015 in Rutland. It was theatrically released in the United Kingdom on 28 October 2016.

== Plot ==
Tom and Nicola Ray are happily married with a young daughter, Grace, and another baby on the way. One night, Tom falls suddenly ill with vomiting and severe stomach pains. Over the next day or two he gets worse, and is later taken to hospital by ambulance when Nicola finds him collapsed at home.

The doctors initially believe it is food poisoning, but it is later found to be sepsis, which requires the removal of both Tom's hands, both legs below the knees, and the lower part of his face. As Tom recovers in hospital, Nicola gives birth to a son who they name Freddie, and struggles to keep up with day-to-day life at home under the pressure of mounting bills. She takes Grace to visit Tom but Grace does not recognise him.

Tom is later discharged with prosthetic limbs and the family begin to adjust their new lives with the help of Nicola's mum, Jean. Nicola starts a local fund, which Tom suggests they use to sue the hospital. He visits a plastic surgeon who says he does not feel he can do anything to change the appearance of his face. After being told they will receive no compensation from the hospital, Tom falls into a deep depression, causing distance between him and Nicola.

They are later forced to move in with Jean, much to Tom's dismay. Disheartened and directionless, he stops taking his medication and relies heavily on alcohol to get through the days. He also writes to his estranged father asking for a loan but gets no response.

During an emotional argument with Nicola, Tom expresses his hatred for his new life and begs her not to leave him. She tells him she will not, that she will always love him, and that his family's love will be his strength. Tom then decides to change the course of his life, focusing on what he can do rather than what he can't.

Pre-credits notes tell the audience Tom started writing again, and that Gracie, now older, is heading off to university. The film ends with a video of the real Ray family who never gave up hope.

== Cast ==
- Tom Riley as Tom Ray
- Joanne Froggatt as Nicola Ray
- Michele Dotrice as Jean
- Phoebe Nicholls as Tom's mother

== Production ==
On 6 February 2015, it was announced that Bill Clark would direct a true story drama film Starfish about a married couple Tom and Nicola Ray. Joanne Froggatt would produce the film along with Pippa Cross through CrossDay Productions Ltd, Mel Paton through Origami Films, and Ros Hubbard through What's The Story.

Principal photography on the film began on 4 December 2015 in Rutland, England.

Tom and Nic Ray published the book Starfish - One Family's Tale of Triumph After Tragedy.

== Reception ==
On the review aggregator website Rotten Tomatoes, 75% of 20 critics' reviews are positive.
