= British Independent Film Awards 2010 =

Annual British film awards ceremony

The 13th British Independent Film Awards, held on 5 December 2010 at The Brewery in West London, honoured the best British independent films of 2010.

== Awards ==
=== Best British Independent Film ===
- The King's Speech
- Four Lions
- Kick-Ass
- Monsters
- Never Let Me Go

=== Best Director ===
- Gareth Edwards – Monsters
- Mike Leigh – Another Year
- Matthew Vaughn – Kick-Ass
- Tom Hooper – The King's Speech
- Mark Romanek – Never Let Me Go

=== The Douglas Hickox Award ===
Given to a British director on their debut feature

- Clio Barnard – The Arbor
- Deborah Gardner-Paterson – Africa United
- Rowan Joffé – Brighton Rock
- Chris Morris – Four Lions
- Gareth Edwards – Monsters

=== Best Actor ===
- Colin Firth – The King's Speech
- Jim Broadbent – Another Year
- Riz Ahmed – Four Lions
- Scoot McNairy – Monsters
- Aidan Gillen – Treacle Junior

=== Best Actress ===
- Carey Mulligan – Never Let Me Go
- Manjinder Virk – The Arbor
- Ruth Sheen – Another Year
- Andrea Riseborough – Brighton Rock
- Sally Hawkins – Made in Dagenham

=== Best Supporting Actor ===
- Geoffrey Rush – The King's Speech
- Kayvan Novak – Four Lions
- Guy Pearce – The King's Speech
- Bob Hoskins – Made in Dagenham
- Andrew Garfield – Never Let Me Go

=== Best Supporting Actress ===
- Helena Bonham Carter – The King's Speech
- Lesley Manville – Another Year
- Rosamund Pike – Made in Dagenham
- Keira Knightley – Never Let Me Go
- Tamsin Greig – Tamara Drewe

=== Best Screenplay ===
- The King's Speech – David Seidler
- Four Lions – Jesse Armstrong, Sam Bain, Simon Blackwell, Chris Morris
- Kick-Ass - Jane Goldman & Matthew Vaughn
- Made in Dagenham – William Ivory
- Never Let Me Go – Alex Garland

=== Most Promising Newcomer ===
- Joanne Froggatt – In Our Name
- Manjinder Virk – The Arbor
- Andrea Riseborough – Brighton Rock
- Tom Hughes – Cemetery Junction
- Conor McCarron – Neds

=== Best Achievement In Production ===
- Monsters
- The Arbor
- In Our Name
- Skeletons
- StreetDance 3D

=== Best Technical Achievement ===
- Monsters – Visual Effects – Gareth Edwards
- The Arbor – Sound – Tim Barker
- Brighton Rock – Cinematography – John Mathieson
- The Illusionist – Animation – Sylvain Chomet
- The King's Speech – Production Design – Eve Stewart

=== Best British Documentary ===
- Enemies of the People
- The Arbor
- Exit Through the Gift Shop
- Fire in Babylon
- Waste Land

=== Best British Short ===
- Baby
- Photograph Of Jesus
- Sign Language
- Sis
- The Road Home

=== Best Foreign Film ===
- A Prophet (Un prophète)
- Dogtooth (Kynodontas)
- I Am Love (Io sono l'amore)
- The Secret in Their Eyes (El secreto de sus ojos)
- Winter's Bone

=== The Raindance Award ===
- Son of Babylon
- Brilliant Love
- Jackboots on Whitehall
- Legacy
- Treacle Jr.

=== The Richard Harris Award ===
- Helena Bonham Carter

=== The Variety Award ===
- Liam Neeson

=== The Special Jury Prize ===
- Jenne Casarotto
