= Wings (1977 TV series) =

- Wings Title Card Series 2
- Genre: Drama
- Created by: Barry Thomas
- Written by: Barry Thomas; Julian Bond; Arden Winch
- Directed by: Jim Goddard; Gareth Davies; Donald McWhinnie; Desmond Davis
- Starring: Tim Woodward; Michael Cochrane; Nicholas Jones; John Hallam; David Troughton; Sarah Porter
- Theme music composer: Alexander Faris
- Country of origin: United Kingdom
- Original language: English
- No. of series: 2
- No. of episodes: 25

Production
- Producer: Peter Cregeen
- Running time: 50 Minutes

Original release
- Network: BBC1
- Release: 2 January 1977 – 30 March 1978

Wings is a drama series about the Royal Flying Corps that ran on BBC television from 1977 to 1978. It stars Tim Woodward as Alan Farmer, a young blacksmith turned fighter pilot in the First World War. Nicholas Jones played his teacher and mentor, Captain Triggers and Michael Cochrane played his upper-class friend, Charles Gaylion, who began a relationship with Farmer's girlfriend while Farmer was believed dead, shot down over France.

The series reveals that the British pilots are struggling with aeroplanes which are unreliable and inferior to the German machines and with an Establishment that classes voicing an opinion to that effect as being tantamount to cowardice. The airmen must also face the resentment of British soldiers who see them having an "easy" life. The rigidity of the British class structure is highlighted when Farmer becomes an officer in the second series – he faces resentment from some officers because of his class and NCOs because of his new rank. The series takes great care with historical accuracy, covering the early days of the parachute, the fitting of weaponry to British biplanes (lacking the Germans' interruptor gear, they had to be fired at an angle rather than between the propeller blades) and the horrors of trench warfare. Wings depicts a Britain that is, in some areas, struggling to adapt in the face of change, at a period that was a turning point for many people's way of life.

The series was created by Barry Thomas. Twenty-five episodes were made in all.

== Effects ==
The book BBC VFX (Mat Irvine and Mike Tucker) states that few First World War aircraft were still airworthy at the time of production so the majority of flying shots were achieved with 1/6 scale radio-controlled models under the guidance of long-time model aircraft expert David Boddington alongside Derek Piggott and Tony Bianchi. Piggott served as a stunt pilot during the filming of the 1966 movie The Blue Max.

== Cast ==
- Nicholas Jones as Captain Owen Triggers
- Tim Woodward as 2nd Lieutenant Alan Farmer
- Michael Cochrane as 2nd Lieutenant Charles Gaylion
- David Troughton as Lieutenant Richard Bravington
- Sarah Porter as Lorna Collins
- Roger Elliott as Sergeant Mills
- Anne Kristen as Molly Farmer
- John Hallam as Harry Farmer
- Reg Lye as Tom
- Michael Jayes as 2nd Lieutenant Michael Starling
- Graham Wyles as Roger Pearson
- Celia Bannerman as Kate Gaylion (series 1)
- Julia Carey as Kate Gaylion (series 2)

Actors who played small parts in the series and later became well known in bigger roles included Anthony Andrews, Simon Cadell, Jane Lapotaire and Tim Pigott-Smith.

== Episodes ==
Series 1 consisted of 12 episodes. Series 2 consisted of 13 episodes.

=== Series 1 (1977) ===
No. overall	No. in series	Title	Directed by	Written by	Original release date
1	1	"The Volunteer"	uncredited	Barry Thomas	2 January 1977
Spring 1915: 18-year-old Alan Farmer, a blacksmith from Becket's Hill in Sussex, lives with his widowed mother, his father having been killed attempting to fly an old plane. Alan continues to have a keen interest in flying and engines and, against his mother's wishes, goes for an interview with the Royal Flying Corps. His father's brother, who has lost an arm on active service, comes to stay with the family and run the smithy. A local farmer's daughter, Lorna Collins, is in love with Alan but he is slow to begin a proper relationship with her. At his interview for the RFC, Alan meets Charles Gaylion, an army officer from an upper-class background who hopes to transfer to the RFC. Alan's interview goes badly, and it is clear that his working-class origins will interfere with his aspirations; however, when he mentions his past "experience" with his father's plane, he is accepted. Alan and Charles are reunited at the training centre, where they meet their instructor Captain Triggers, at first sight a bad-tempered disciplinarian. Mistakenly believing Alan to be an experienced pilot, Triggers takes him up in a dual-controlled Avro which Alan proves unable to land. He is berated by Triggers for risking both their lives. As Alan is packing his case, expecting to be dismissed, Triggers unexpectedly returns, makes encouraging remarks to Gaylion, and insists on Alan taking another flight, this time with Triggers at the controls. He performs advanced manoeuvres that leave Alan feeling foolish, but ends by telling him that he can continue with his training.
2	2	"Never Turn Back"	Jim Goddard	Barry Thomas	9 January 1977
April 1915: Alan Farmer's training is well-advanced, and he shares accommodation with Sergeant MacIver, who already has experience of service with the RFC in France. Alan has had to spend time doing basic army training, whilst Charles Gaylion has already been able to complete his pilot training. Gaylion comes to visit, immediately prior to leaving for France, and now adopts a dismissive attitude towards Captain Triggers' training, particularly to the advice he has been giving Alan and the others about how to defend themselves. Charles believes that there should be honour and chivalry between pilots and is shocked to learn that Triggers and Sergeant MacIver once destroyed a German plane before it had taken off. Alan and Charles quarrel before Alan goes home on leave. Before Charles leaves, MacIver explains the circumstances surrounding the killing of the German pilot, and Charles learns new respect for Triggers, who sees him off with regret and concern. While Alan is visiting his family, his relationship with Lorna begins to get more serious. His Uncle Harry quarrels with the blacksmith, Tom, about the raising of charges in the smithy, much to the disapproval of Alan's mother, but the two men make up their differences. During a training flight, Alan's engine fails on take-off, but he remembers Triggers' advice "not to turn back" and crash-lands the plane in a field. The plane bursts into flames, but MacIver and Triggers rescue Alan from the wreckage. His training complete, Alan receives his "wings" and leaves for France.
3	3	"Welcome to France"	Gareth Davies	Barry Thomas	16 January 1977
May 1915: Alan arrives at "C" Flight in St Marie, France and faces resentment from some officers because of to his background ("A blacksmith? We are getting desperate for chaps"), but quickly wins over his CO, Captain Dornish, and is delighted to be reunited with his friend Charles. Following the death of another NCO on the day he arrives, Alan, initially sent out as a "spare" pilot, is sent on a mission to range for the artillery, in the company of Lt Richard Bravington, an experienced Observer officer. When they are attacked by a German plane, equipped with a machine gun, Bravington is wounded. Alan fails to follow Bravington's instructions correctly, and lands the plane behind enemy lines. However, he uses Bravington's rifle to fight off an attack by approaching German soldiers, thus winning Bravington's regard. At home, Alan's mother is invited to the cinema by the local grocer, Mr Rudkin, and Harry appears jealous, until she reveals that she has turned down a second invitation because she is not romantically interested in Mr Rudkin.
4	4	"Business As Usual"	Donald McWhinnie	Arden Winch	23 January 1977
June 1915: "C" Flight is ordered to locate a German Howitzer so the artillery can attack it. Alan volunteers, but Captain Dornish insists on carrying out the task himself, taking a newly arrived observer, Guthrie, on the mission. When they fail to return, a new Flight Commander is required. Charles Gaylion is obliged to become acting CO until a replacement is appointed: Captain Triggers. When his plane fails en route, Triggers finds himself waiting at the railway station with a wounded Infantry Officer, where he learns the horrible truth of Dornish's fate: shot down by British troops who resented having their positions given away to the enemy. Back in Sussex, 17-year-old Richard Hollis, a member of the local gentry, has been inspired by Alan's progress in the RFC and visits Mrs Farmer regularly to borrow Alan's books on the subject.
5	5	"Speaking From Experience"	Jim Goddard	Arden Winch	30 January 1977
June 1915: On his arrival at "C" Flight, Triggers' forthright manner and unusual ideas quickly make an impression. Seeing the inadequacies of the planes, Triggers encourages the pilots and NCOs to put forward ideas for improvement. Alan Farmer and his Observer, Bravington, get into trouble for firing a pistol to warn another British plane of the approach of a German plane, but this leads to a new strategy. Corporal Morgan, eager to win a weekend in Paris promised by Triggers, comes up with several ingenious plans for improving the plane's performance, but it is Alan who has a startling new idea that may help turn the tide. Back in Sussex, the Army begins recruiting in the village. Richard Hollis's grandfather, Sir John, leads the effort, and Lorna assists by playing the piano. As men come forward to volunteer, Harry receives news from Molly that Richard has been killed in an accident, during his first solo training flight.
6	6	"Over The Top"	uncredited	Julian Bond	6 February 1977
June 1915: With hot weather and a break in the bombardment, Alan goes swimming and Morgan experiments with fitting bombs with parachutes. The RFC are summoned to assist in a new initiative, and Gaylion gets a taste of the horrors of life in the trenches when his plane is forced down and he must wait overnight for the arrival of a replacement propeller. He observes the demoralising effect of trench warfare on an infantry battalion and on their commander, Captain Carey. Alan convinces Triggers to allow him to transport the spare propeller on the Avro. Triggers brings Gaylion back to base while Alan fits the replacement propeller and, with Carey's help, takes off in Gaylion's plane; as he is leaving, he sees Carey killed by shell fire. On return to base, he finds that Corporal Morgan has been killed by one of his own bombs. Triggers and Alan both blame themselves for Morgan's death. Remorse, and the thought of Morgan's family, lead Alan to write to Lorna, breaking off their engagement. Alan and Charles visit a brothel where they become very drunk and start a fight. Triggers receives a complaint from the authorities, but protects the men's identities to save them from punishment. The next day, Alan flies with Bravington and is hit and wounded in the leg by their "favourite Hun" – the German plane equipped with a machine gun.
7	7	"Time Out of War"	Jim Goddard	Julian Bond	13 February 1977
July 1915: Following his accident, Alan has to spend three weeks acting as Charles Gaylion's observer. His friendship with Gaylion causes unrest among the NCOs because of the difference in their rank, and becomes a concern for Triggers. Alan and Charles are sent back to England to pick up a new plane from Farnborough. Charles, being an officer, travels first class, but Alan is forced to stand in a crowded compartment with the other ranks. On arrival, they learn that the plane is not ready; while they are waiting, Lorna comes to see Alan at the factory. He tells her that they are both changing and he finds it difficult to plan for the future, but agrees to continue to write to her. While staying overnight at the Gaylions' home in London, he is introduced to Charles's sister Kate and her pacifist friends. Having slept until evening, he gets ready to go out with Charles but finds that only Kate is in the house. They have supper together, and Kate tells Alan that Charles has developed a drinking habit because of his fear of being at the Front. Charles returns, drunk and furious at finding Alan and Kate alone together, and creates a scene. On their return to base, Triggers is at first relieved to see that they have fallen out, but later reproves both of them for their conduct and tries to explain the need for "structure on the ground".
8	8	"The Hunters"	Desmond Davis	Barry Thomas	20 February 1977
July 1915: Although they have not made up their quarrel, Alan and Charles are forced to continue flying as a team. Ordered by Triggers to continue with reconnaissance and to avoid the enemy, they are anxious to do something about the German plane that has been causing them so much trouble, particularly after it shoots down Charles's friend Lt Favell. Charles devises a method of fitting a Lewis gun to their plane, which Alan carries out, using his metalwork skills. They take on the enemy plane but only just get home in one piece when Alan shoots out the struts of one wing of their own plane. When Triggers himself is almost shot down by the German machine-gunner does he agree to allow the use of the Lewis gun to be attempted, and orders them to accept the written challenge from the Germans who wish to renew their duel "with our gallant enemy". This time they meet with better success, but Alan, having shot the German gunner, pretends the gun has jammed rather than kill the pilot as well. Back at home in Sussex, Mr Rudkin and Harry take Molly for a picnic and privately discuss their mutual feelings for her. Lorna continues to pine for Alan, and arranges to work evenings as a nursing assistant at a local convalescent hospital.
9	9	"New Deal"	uncredited	Julian Bond	27 February 1977
July 1915: Alan helps Charles to capture a German plane and its crew but is not invited to the meal in their honour in the Officers' Mess that evening. Triggers is also unhappy at the two German officers being entertained, but follows the lead taken by his CO. After the senior officers have left, the remaining drunken officers indulge in horseplay and fail to keep close watch on the prisoners, who make an escape attempt. Alan, who is out shooting game, thwarts the Germans' escape attempt. Rather than give him a commendation (which will expose the officers' negligent behaviour), Triggers allows him a 48-hour pass to Paris where he calls on the Gaylion family and meets Charles's sister Kate again; they go out for dinner and dancing, but Alan is disappointed when Kate refuses to make any firm arrangement to see him again. Triggers is desperate when "C" Flight is ordered on a suicidal mission to bring down a German kite balloon, despite the shortcomings of their planes, and Alan and his observer narrowly save Charles from being shot down. They hit on the idea of flying over the German lines in the captured enemy Albatros, and successfully bring down the balloon, but once again Charles gets the credit from his fellow officers, whilst Alan receives a dressing-down from Triggers for the unsporting manner in which it was achieved.
10	10	"The Burning Question"	Jim Goddard	Arden Winch	6 March 1977
August 1915: Charles Gaylion's plane is set on fire despite him not having sighted the enemy. Triggers receives information about increased casualties among British pilots and he, Charles and Alan Farmer puzzle over the source of the danger. A new arrival, Lieutenant Conrad, makes few friends because of his superior attitude, but his superb eyesight becomes an advantage when he sees that what Charles and others have mistaken for a French Morane is in fact a German monoplane. Back in England, Lorna has volunteered to be a nurse and is looking after injured pilots; she begins to realise the dangers Alan faces. Triggers is frustrated that his superiors do not believe their planes are being outclassed by the Germans but his frustration turns to anger when a magazine sent to Alan by his mother provides the answer: the Germans have developed a machine gun that can fire through the propeller. With Farmer and Conrad as back-up, he lures the German monoplane into attacking him until it is driven off by Conrad with a hunting rifle, giving him the evidence he needs to alert the rest of the RFC.
11	11	"The Prisoner's Friend"	Desmond Davis	Arden Winch	13 March 1977
August 1915: The arrival of the new German monoplane forces Triggers to order the pilots of "C" Flight to fly in pairs. Despite having been wounded in the right arm on his previous flight, he returns to active service and, while awaiting the arrival of replacements for a crew killed by the monoplane, he insists on flying a routine reconnaissance alone; he and his observer go missing. Charles Gaylion is obliged to take over as temporary commanding officer, and sends Alan to photograph a German artillery dump with his observer, Conrad. When faced with the Eindecker and ordered by Conrad to move closer, Farmer turns for home and avoids a confrontation. Back on the ground, Conrad insists Farmer be court-martialled for disobeying an order and cowardice in the face of the enemy. Gaylion has no power to prevent the court-martial but succeeds in ensuring that the presiding officer has experience of flying. He agrees to represent Farmer as the "prisoner's friend" but his inexperience soon shows. At home in Sussex, the local vicar reveals the news about the court-martial to Molly, thus incurring Harry's displeasure; Molly writes to her MP to try to get help for Alan. Even after the removal of Conrad from the courtroom for arguing with the presiding officer, the court-martial is going badly for Alan, who admits to having disobeyed a direct order. As Charles begins his concluding speech, the proceedings are interrupted by the arrival of a bedraggled Triggers, who has escaped from a German field hospital after being shot down ten days earlier. His evidence is critical to the outcome of the court-martial. Alan is found guilty of disobeying an order but not guilty of cowardice, and is given a minimal sentence. Charles remains devastated at his own inadequacy as counsel for the defence.
12	12	"Welcome Home"	uncredited	Barry Thomas	20 March 1977
Shortly before Molly's birthday, she receives the good news about Alan's acquittal. Following the court martial, Conrad demands a different pilot but Alan insists he wants to carry on flying with the same observer, admiring Conrad's bravery. Conrad is unrepentant and, despite being ordered not to look for trouble, orders Alan to fly slightly off-course in the hope of engaging the German monoplane. When Alan is tempted to disobey, Conrad threatens him with his revolver. Conrad manages to shoot down the Eindecker but is fatally wounded himself. Triggers is angry when Alan writes up the full detail of the incident, and insists on his rewriting his report, hinting that a commission may be in the offing. Mr Rudkin proposes to Molly. When she refuses him, he decides to join the infantry, anticipating the introduction of conscription. While teaching Molly to ride a bicycle, Harry betrays his own feelings towards her. Charles comes to tell Alan he had been granted a week's leave and finds him writing to Kate; he warns Alan that she will treat him badly. On his return to Becket's Hill, he intends to stay for only a few days then go to London to see Kate, but, when he telephones her to make arrangements, she makes it clear she is not interested. Gossip and bad feeling against the Farmer family surface among some of the local people, and Harry and Alan get into a fight when local youths mock the RFC. On meeting Lorna again, Alan finds she has matured, and they begin to rekindle their relationship.

=== Series 2 (1978) ===
No. overall	No. in series	Title	Directed by	Written by	Original release date
13	1	"Forward Action"	Peter Jefferies	Barry Thomas	5 January 1978
As Alan's leave in Sussex comes to an end, he and Lorna become engaged, and he sells his motorbike to buy her a ring. Meanwhile, Harry leaves Becket's Hill to work in a munitions factory. Triggers is frustrated by the attitude of his commanding officer, until the Major, burdened by the responsibility of his position, takes over Triggers' reconnaissance duties and is shot down and killed. Enraged by the RFC losses against superior German machines, Triggers remembers one of the Major's comments and attempts to ram an Eindecker, but fails to bring it down. On the same day, a general arrives to visit the base, and meets Alan as the latter returns from leave. Triggers' frequent protests to senior commanders at last bear fruit, as the general orders "C" Flight into forward action, with the task of keeping the Eindeckers busy so as to prevent them from shooting down British reconnaissance planes. For the first time in the series, German pilots are shown discussing tactics. All the observers except Bravington are sent away to join the reconnaissance effort, and Triggers introduces a new regime, with Sergeant Mills instructing the pilots in keep-fit exercises. With a new French engine and a Lewis gun fitted to the BE2, Alan is sent to try out a new approach and succeeds in unnerving the German pilots.
14	2	"Zeppelin"	John Sichel	Gidley Wheeler	12 January 1978
With German Zeppelins making bombing raids across Britain, Major Lancing arrives with orders for "C" Flight to forget the Eindeckers and bomb the Zeppelin sheds in Belgium. The pilots are instructed in bombing techniques by the experienced Sgt Hollywake but his disregard for the threat of the German monoplanes angers Alan, who is becoming obsessed with the Eindecker. At home, the threat of the Zeppelins is giving concern, but Molly is even more worried by Tom's inability to cope on his own in the smithy, and asks him to train her as his assistant. Triggers, Mills and Bravington eventually develop a plan to intercept a Zeppelin on its way home. Too late to impress a conference on the flying service, the last bombing raid is a failure on all counts: not only does Hollywake offload his bombs to avoid engaging superior numbers, but Alan's BE2 is shot down behind enemy lines. Just as Molly is congratulating herself on her first horseshoe, a telegram arrives with the news.
15	3	"Another Country"	Peter Jeffries	Julian Bond	19 January 1978
The replacement pilot arrives in the form of Lieutenant Michael Starling, an Oxford academic keen to show off his expertise in flying theory. Meanwhile Triggers is ordered to drop a British spy behind enemy lines and is shocked when the spy turns out to be an attractive young widow, Madame Boissier. When their plane suffers engine failure, they are forced to land and take refuge with a French priest. Back at base, Gaylion, now acting flight commander, refuses to order a rescue mission. While Triggers awaits the arrival of a local mechanic, Starling locates the grounded plane and destroys it, cutting off their escape route. Triggers, now out of uniform in the hope of escaping detection, and Madame Boissier are betrayed to the Germans by the mechanic. Despite the efforts of a sympathetic German defending officer, they are both found guilty of spying and sentenced to death by firing squad at dawn the following day. Madame Boissier attempts to save Triggers by revealing to the court that he is a British officer, but both are imprisoned overnight. Triggers confides in Madame Boissier about his troubled family life, and begins to feel affection for her. The Germans, having found his uniform and papers at the priest's house, make him a prisoner of war but no reprieve is forthcoming for Madame Boissier, who is shot while Triggers watches from a window. Incensed by her treatment, he escapes from the prisoner transport and returns to base, picks up a plane and strafes the car carrying the German commanding officer away from the place of execution. Only to Starling does he reveal something of his true feelings.
16	4	"Transfer"	John Sichel	Julian Bond	26 January 1978
When Charles Gaylion crashes a BE2 on takeoff, he fears losing his nerve. He attempts to take another plane up at once but there is an accident and one of the mechanics loses both of his hands. Despite the fact that a faulty ignition switch is discovered, Gaylion blames himself and begins to behave increasingly erratically. Bravington attempts to cover up for him but the two end up fighting in the mess. In the meantime, Triggers, having recognised the signs of stress in his most experienced pilot, is attempting to get him temporarily posted back to Britain as a flying instructor. The transfer comes through on Charles's birthday, and his fellow officers arrange an impromptu party; on hearing the news, Charles bursts into tears of relief. Returning to his family home in London, he finds that his sister Kate has become an ambulance driver and his parents are expecting a government minister to dinner. His father, now promoted to major-general, assumes that Charles has taken his new posting unwillingly and would prefer to be at the Front. Although slightly drunk, Charles gives the minister his informed opinions on the shortcomings of the BE2 over dinner, and his father is surprised to find that his forthright speech has made a favourable impression on their guest. However, after the minister has left, an argument breaks out and a hysterical Charles admits the reason for his transfer, incurring his father's displeasure. Only Kate appears to feel some sympathy for his predicament.
17	5	"Stunt – Or Die!"	Peter Jeffries	Barry Thomas	2 February 1978
Charles Gaylion, sent to train new pilots in the south of England, quickly becomes frustrated at the rules that forbid him teaching the trainees anything potentially dangerous. His ideas for a new training system are dismissed as nonsense by his commanding officer, who will not allow new pilots to fly, alone or accompanied, in the slightest adverse weather conditions. Charles does, however, find a home from home at Becket's Hill, where he begins to visit Molly and Lorna on a regular basis. Molly still has some hope of Alan being found alive, but Lorna feels sure that she will never see him again. After an argument with one angry flying pupil, Lt Towy-Jones, who questions his courage, Charles demonstrates how to get out of a spin, allowing the trainee to try it for himself even though it means risking both their lives. However, a less able pupil, Westerley, hearing about his friend's success, decides to take a plane up alone and attempt the same manoeuvre, while Charles is off the base taking Lorna up for a pleasure flight. Westerley crashes and is killed, but, when Charles attempts to take responsibility for the incident, he receives unexpected sympathy from his CO and is not blamed. At the end of the episode, the viewer catches a glimpse of Alan Farmer, semi-conscious and being cared for in a private house.
18	6	"Dawn Attack"	John Sichel	Barry Thomas	9 February 1978
Alan is being cared for by a French family close to a German airfield. Gradually recovering from his accident, with the help of the daughter of the house, Françoise, he conceives a plan of escape. Just as "C" Flight are being congratulated by the general on the success of their "forward action", a German attack on Sainte Marie takes them by surprise. All but one of the planes are destroyed, and several men are killed. Bravington, frustrated at no longer being able to take an active part in missions, quarrels with Triggers over how to retaliate; Triggers forces the remaining men to work all night to repair the one surviving BE2. Disguised as a peasant bringing the early morning milk delivery, Alan gains entry to the German airfield and manages to make his escape in an Eindecker. However, lying in wait for him is Captain Triggers in the last BE2, intent on taking his revenge for the attack on Sainte Marie. Having forced down the German plane, he is about to shoot Alan when they recognise one another. Back in England, Molly has become resentful of the amount of time Lorna is spending with Charles, and she quarrels with both of them over their apparent betrayal of Alan; Lorna herself is convinced that Alan is dead. Charles takes Lorna to meet his family, but only his sister Kate is at home. When they are left alone, Kate forces Charles to admit that he is in love with Lorna. Triggers sends Alan home on leave, in the expectation that his wedding to Lorna will take place. However, the news of Alan's safe return causes Charles and Lorna to acknowledge their feelings for one another, and Lorna tells Charles she cannot marry Alan.
19	7	"Machine-Gun Post"	Peter Jefferies	Barry Thomas	16 February 1978
Bravington, feeling under-employed, is determined to train as a pilot, and makes an unauthorised solo flight, much to Triggers' annoyance. Triggers is ordered to deal with a German machine-gun post prior to a big "push", but the duo's attempts to attack it from the air prove ineffectual. Alan returns to Sussex on leave. When Charles tells Lorna of his intention to "bow out", she confides in her mother that she no longer wants to marry Alan. Mrs Collins, seeing Charles as a better "catch", is cool towards Alan, when he visits her to talk about plans for the wedding. Shortly afterwards, he sees Charles and Lorna kissing, and retreats without being seen. Unaware that Charles has already arranged to be posted back to France, Alan goes to the training base and confronts him. Charles accepts the blame for his relationship with Lorna, but Alan will not be placated and gives him a beating. With his plan to bomb the German post having failed, Triggers decides to land behind enemy lines and attack it with grenades. On landing, he is met by a German general, who is captured and taken back to Sainte Marie by Bravington, on Triggers' orders. Triggers sets off to attack the post alone, telling Bravington to send Starling back for him, but Starling is out on patrol and Bravington has to go back himself. Triggers manages to disable the machine-gun post, and steals the general's car to escape from the pursuing Germans. After Bravington successfully flies them both back to base, Triggers agrees that he has proved his suitability for pilot training, but cannot recommend him because of a new directive preventing observers from retraining as pilots. Alan visits Lorna and realises that the feelings she and Charles have developed for one another are genuine. Lorna announces her intention to go to France as a nurse. Alan apologises for his behaviour and tells his mother that he will take over from her at the smithy for the remainder of his leave. This is the last episode to feature Alan's mother or his home village of Becket's Hill.
20	8	"Officers and Gentlemen"	John Sichel	Arden Winch	23 February 1978
Alan Farmer shoots down a German observation balloon, but spares the unarmed observer; he is told by Triggers to stay away from the balloons in future. Triggers is intending to recommend Farmer for a commission, but is disappointed with the response from his other officers. Bravington has reservations about his "suitability". Mills and Starling accept the news philosophically but there are signs of resentment from the NCOs. When a German plane drops a note about an injured British airman, Alan misunderstands his purpose and shoots down the German, gaining further criticism. After a disastrous interview, in which Alan's background and academic record are picked over by the selection panel, he goes to a bar where he experiences further resentment from embittered members of an infantry division. Alan drinks with their sergeant, who is at first sympathetic, but then criticises Alan for not having killed the German observer, telling him that the balloon was quickly repaired. That same evening, Triggers is visited by the chairman of the selection panel, who wants to understand his reasons for recommending Alan for a commission. On Alan's next flight, he makes a point of attacking the German observation balloon again, this time killing the observer; to his surprise, Triggers seems pleased by his action. He then receives the news that he has been commissioned, and is welcomed into the officers' mess.
21	9	"Guardian Angel"	Peter Cregeen	Arden Winch	2 March 1978
Triggers arranges for Alan to share Charles Gaylion's quarters, hoping that the more experienced officer will help him cope with the insubordination he still experiences, following his promotion. Both are initially unhappy with the move, and quarrel when Alan discovers that Lorna has written to Charles. The "guardian angel" parachute remains unused by the RFC because of its excessive weight and awkwardness. An American engineer, Leroy Schultz, has invented an alternative parachute which can be opened manually but can only be used once. "Special Flight" are asked by the general to see Schultz and give their views; Alan is broadly in favour of anything that could save pilots' lives, but Triggers fears it will encourage the pilot to jump and sees it as an excuse for cowardice. Schultz, previously the proprietor of a "flying circus", stands to make a fortune should the RFC take the parachute, and is regarded with suspicion, particularly after he offers Alan a cut of the profits in return for his support. Alan is prepared to volunteer for a demonstration jump, but Triggers will not allow any of his men to make the jump. After Schultz confesses to Alan that he has not used the parachute himself since a fatal accident involving a member of the public, Alan persuades him to do the jump. Just before take-off, an inquisitive airman, left alone in Triggers' office, plays with the parachute and clumsily attempts to conceal what he has done. When Schultz realises the chute has been tampered with and he has no time to re-pack it, he agrees to jump, but loses his nerve when Alan takes him up in the plane. The idea of the parachute is abandoned, but Charles admires Alan's courage.
22	10	"The Price"	John Sichel	Arden Winch	9 March 1978
As C Flight puzzle over how to protect reconnaissance aircraft from the Germans, Triggers is astonished to be recalled to Britain. He finds he has been seconded as an advisor and test pilot at the factory which is to build a new fighter – the factory owned by Triggers' own father. The initial signs are good: the new "Viper" has a better rate of climb and will be equipped with a forward-mounted machine gun, but Triggers has concerns. His relationship with his father is fraught, and he is annoyed that Mr Triggers wants to press ahead with manufacturing the plane in bulk before resolving issues such as the purchase of a suitable engine from Spain. Following a test flight, he insists the design be amended before putting the prototype into production to make it safe enough for the average pilot to fly. In an attempt to prove that the "Viper" can be handled by the average pilot, the designer Tony Snow takes it for a further test flight. The plane crashes in flames, and Snow is killed. Triggers' father still wants him to remain at home to take charge of the factory he will one day inherit. Triggers, who is uninterested in the business, applies to return to France and is posted back to "C" Flight where his pilots are still unsuccessfully trying to shoot down the enemy's Eindeckers.
23	11	"Mutiny"	uncredited	Julian Bond	16 March 1978
Soldiers from a battalion stationed nearby break into Sainte Marie and steal the pilots' rations. Led by a former university lecturer, they have mutinied because of harsh and unfair treatment; their CO attempts unsuccessfully to impose discipline. When an enraged Triggers threatens to take the law into his own hands, he is encouraged by the response of the army authorities, and decides to take two planes to the mutineers' encampment and frighten them into submission. Bravington opposes the plan. When Starling finds out what is proposed, he secretly visits the mutineers' encampment in an attempt to reason with them, but they refuse to allow him to leave. When the planes from "C" Flight set out to rescue Starling, Triggers instructs Alan who's flying with him to shoot anyone who tries to prevent Starling leaving. Alan fires the first shot in a gunfight which results in Starling being wounded and all the mutineers being killed by Alan and Triggers who landed first before Charles and Bravington. In order to cover up the truth about the incident, Alan and Starling are both reprimanded by Triggers. While visiting Starling in hospital, Alan and Charles meet Lorna again, but she angrily rejects advances from both of them.
24	12	"No Medals"	Peter Jefferies	Gidley Wheeler	23 March 1978
The pilots of "C" Flight are dispatched to Veuve-sur-Meuse under the command of Captain Boucharlat to assist in fighting a surprisingly large number of Eindeckers. Gaylion is delayed on take-off and is shot down by an Eindecker. Boucharlat shows a lack of sensitivity and Alan reacts violently to his apparent lack of concern over the missing pilot. Having destroyed his aircraft, Gaylion is befriended by a Frenchman who knew his uncle at The Hague. He informs Gaylion of the Germans' plans for a massive offensive, something Triggers and Starling have begun to suspect from the Germans' movements. Boucharlat refuses to listen and irritates the pilots of "C" Flight, especially Starling, with his mocking attitude towards the British equipment and their lack of medals. Their housekeeper's 16-year-old daughter grows attached to Triggers, who finds her attentions amusing and takes an interest in her collection of souvenirs. When he agrees to give her one of his spare buttons, the girl responds by kissing him, but her mother enters the room at that moment, jumps to the wrong conclusion and locks her in her room. Boucharlat accuses Triggers of attempting to seduce the girl. Charles Gaylion's French acquaintance is killed, but Charles makes it back across the lines with the intelligence; Starling is surprised when Boucharlat confesses he has suspected the truth all along. In the meantime, angered by Boucharlat's attitude, Triggers and Alan take to the air, determined to show that they can shoot down an Eindecker. They succeed, but the plane crashes into the church, killing several civilians including the housekeeper. The British pilots are obliged to leave the area.
25	13	"Heroes"	Peter Jefferies	Barry Thomas	30 March 1978
Lorna visits Sainte Marie to look for Charles Gaylion, and tells him she wants Alan to stop visiting her; Charles impulsively asks her to marry him, and she accepts. Dick Bravington is aware of her visit, but neither he nor Charles tells Alan about it. Michael Starling goes out on patrol and is faced with two Eindeckers working as a team. They shoot him down and his plane continues to circle eerily for some time after he is dead; the loss makes an impact on the rest of the officers. With a big "push" due, Colonel Smith arrives with orders that "C" Flight are to adopt new signalling methods and patrol the lines, reporting progress. Smith insists on accompanying Triggers on his patrol to view battle conditions, and Triggers takes a delight in making sure he experiences the worst aspects of such a patrol. Their plane is hit and forced down in No Man's Land. Taking cover in a ruined building, they find two trapped soldiers and realise they are under attack from both sides of the lines. Triggers and the men make it to a bomb crater but Smith is killed attempting to reach the British lines. Despite Triggers' instructions that planes should continue to fly alone, Alan insists on accompanying Charles on patrol. They succeed in shooting down an Eindecker, but Bravington is unimpressed, and Farmer accuses him of resentment at the fact that Farmer has been promoted whilst Bravington is unable to get pilot training. When he confronts Charles about what he sees as his and Dick's poor treatment of him, Charles confesses that he is engaged to Lorna. On hearing that Triggers has been shot down, the two pilots take off in an attempt to draw the German fire to allow Triggers and the others to return to their own trenches, but Triggers is hit by a shell blast while trying to carry a fatally-wounded man to safety. "C" Flight are assigned to a new squadron, and the three remaining officers commiserate with one another on having to leave their base and not having Triggers around any more. As they are packing to leave, a military truck arrives carrying Triggers, now unable to walk on crutches. The series ends as he is welcomed back by the men he commanded.

== Broadcast ==
The first series was screened on BBC1 on Sundays from 2 January 1977 to 20 March 1977. The second series was shown on BBC1 on Thursdays from 5 January 1978 to 30 March 1978.
