= Denmark (2019 film) =

2019 British film

- Promotional poster
- Directed by: Adrian Shergold
- Written by: Jeff Murphy
- Produced by: David Aukin; Ed Talfan
- Starring: Rafe Spall; Simone Lykke; Joel Fry
- Cinematography: Ulf Brantås
- Edited by: Tania Reddin
- Music by: Richard Hawley
- Production companies: Severn Screen; Daybreak Films; BBC Films; Ffilm Cymru
- Distributed by: Blue Finch Films
- Release dates: September 2019 (Calgary); July 20, 2020 (United Kingdom)
- Running time: 92 minutes
- Country: United Kingdom
- Language: English

Denmark is a 2019 British comedy drama film. It was also marketed under the title One Way to Denmark.

It was filmed during 2019 in the Tredegar and Senghenydd areas of south Wales and in Esbjerg in Denmark. It was part-funded by Film Cymru Wales and BBC Film.

== Plot ==
Herb leads an aimless life in a small town in the Welsh valleys. He is unemployed and about to have his benefits cut. Divorced and estranged from his young son, he lives alone in a cramped and dingy basement flat with a neighbour who incessantly plays loud music. After being mugged, he learns from a TV report that Danish prisoners lead a better life than he does, with regular activity, readily available healthcare and hotel-style bedrooms complete with TV and en suite bathrooms.

Herb hatches a plan to travel to Denmark, stage a bank robbery and enter a Danish prison, thereby improving his situation. After stowing away on a cargo ship, he lands in a Danish port town where he loses his nerve and is unable to go through with a planned bank robbery. By now befriended by Matilda – a local barmaid – and a large stray dog, he realises the futility of his robbery plan, and decides to return to the UK. Lacking the funds for a ferry ticket home, he panics and attempts to get a ticket using a replica firearm. Herb is arrested, but released without charge due to contacts Matilda has with the local police. Herb decides to return to Wales to sort out his relationship with his son, then come back to Denmark, where a romance with Matilda is beginning to develop.

== Cast ==
- Rafe Spall as Herb
- Simone Lykke as Matilda
- Joel Fry as the Captain
- Paul Barber as the Captain's father
- Rosalind March as Herb's Mother
- Steve Speirs as Harry the Horse
- Russell Gomer as Chip Shop Man
- Elis James as Aubrey
- Tim Woodward as Idris
- Ri Richards as Rose
- Benedikte Hansen as Matilda's mother
- Thomas W. Gabrielsson as Chresten

== Release and reception ==
The film was first shown at the Calgary International Film Festival in September 2019. It also played at the Glasgow Film Festival in March 2020. It went on general release in July 2020, primarily digitally including via video on demand. On release it carried a 15 certificate as only suitable for those aged 15 and over, mainly due to "strong language".

=== Critical response ===
While the film received mixed reviews, Rafe Spall's acting and Richard Hawley's soundtrack received consistent praise.

On cineroom.co.uk, Adam Ray Palmer rated the film as 3.5 stars out of 5. He praises both Spall's performance and Richard Hawley's "top notch" music score. However he notes that the film "falls down at times in the execution of such a good, original idea", it "feeling a bit laborious at times" and "just falls short of being a polished film".

Steve Palace on thehollywoodnews.com gave 3 stars out of 5. He describes it as "a low key effort [that] does just about enough to hold your attention. ... Neither meaty and thought-provoking enough to be a satisfying drama, or light and sharp enough to be a great comedy ... Giving the movie its royal flush is Richard Hawley on soundtrack duties. The music is one of the memorable things about this well-made and performed effort".

Chloe Walker of Culturefly gives 3 out of 5 stars. Praising Spall as a "master of the lovable losers, [imbuing] just the right level of humour and hurt, that you can’t help but root for him." The film however "starts to lose its way" and "it putters around aimlessly until the end credits. His budding relationship with Matilda is sweetly played, yet rote and predictable; she may as well have had ‘love interest’ tattooed on her forehead from the moment she appeared. The film never gets boring ... It’s just a silly, rambling, perfectly pleasant way to spend ninety minutes."

On: Yorkshire Magazine's Roger Crow gave a positive review, with Spall's performance as "one of his finest turns to date", Richard Hawley providing "some terrific songs", while Jeff Murphy’s script "never strikes a false note".

Theia, a Scottish Deerhound who played the stray dog who befreinds Herb, won the 'Comedy Canine' category in the 2021 Fidos Awards for the best canine movies.
