= Mel Raido =

Jamaican-born English actor (born 1977)

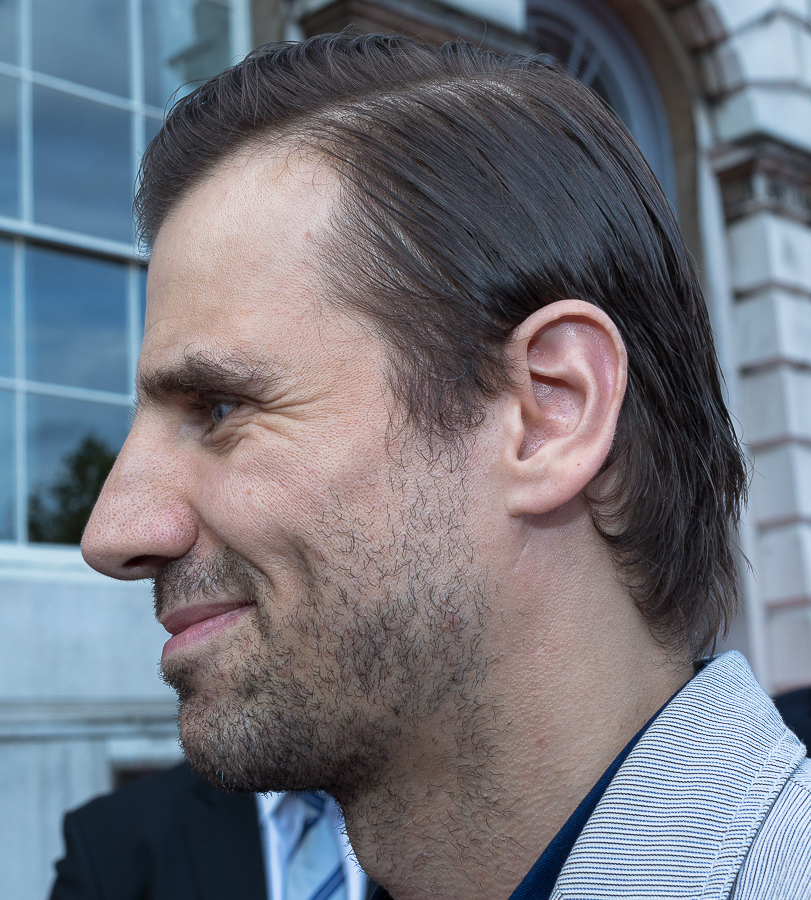
Raido in 2015

Mel Raido (born 1977) is a Jamaican-English actor. Raido moved to London at three years old. After taking elocution lessons, he started to become hooked by the acting bug at school and studied at the Webber Douglas Academy of Dramatic Art.

== Early life and training ==
Raido, whose given name is Menelaus Joaquin, was born in Jamaica and, at age three, relocated to London with his family. He studied at Webber Douglas Academy of Dramatic Art between 1996 and 1999.

== Career ==
He subsequently worked with the avant-garde theatre company Mabou Mines before starting his TV and film career. Mel made his breakthrough in the play Corpus Christi, where he played Jesus, at the Edinburgh Festival in 1999. He then went on to appear in numerous plays all over the country and in television dramas such as Midsomer Murders, Red Cap and The Vice.

=== Theatre ===
He has appeared numerous theatres in London including the Finborough Theatre (I Witness by Joshua Sobol in 2007), the Pleasance Theatre (Corpus Christi by Terrence McNally in 1999, and Office Games by Trevor Baxter in 2003), Southwark Playhouse (Eskimo Sisters by Laline Paull in 2002), and Royal Court Theatre (Fireface by Marius von Mayenburg in 2000).

== Filmography ==
Year	Title	Role	Notes
2001	Midsomer Murders	Chris Megson	TV series Episode: "Who Killed Cock Robin"
2002	Long Time Dead	Joe	
2006	O Jerusalem	Jakob	
2007	Grow Your Own	Nick	
2008	The Informers	Bryan Metro	
2008	He Kills Coppers	Billy Porter	
2009	Clubbed	Danny	
2010	One In Ten	Mark	
2010	In Our Name	Mark Jackson	
2011	Spooks	Johnny Grier	
2011	Strike Back: Project Dawn	Hassani	
2014	Gemma Bovery	Patrick	
2015	The Trials of Jimmy Rose	Tony Chivers	Short TV series
2015	Legend	Ian Barrie	
2016	The Disappointments Room	David	
2017	Just Getting Started	Oscar	
2019	Dark Encounter	Ray	
2023	Dead Island 2	Patton	
