= Littlebeck, North Yorkshire =

Hamlet in North Yorkshire, England

Coordinates: 54.4325°N 0.6460°W

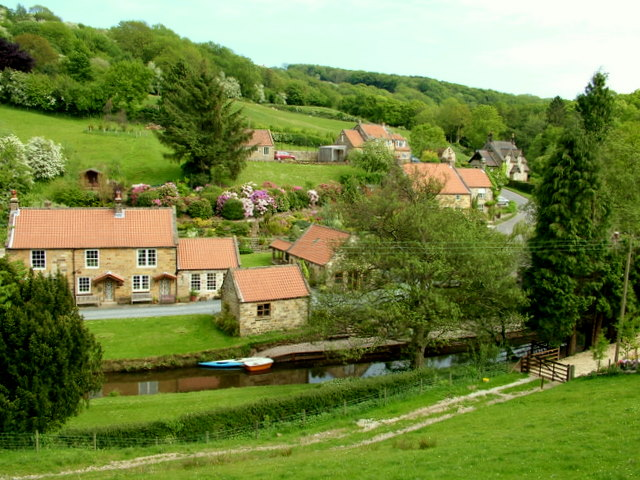
View of Littlebeck with the eponymous stream

Littlebeck is a hamlet in the North York Moors National Park, near Whitby, in North Yorkshire, England. It stands on the Little Beck, a minor tributary of the River Esk.

An alum works operated in Littlebeck between 1660 and 1809. It was located at NZ879047.

From 1974 to 2023, it was part of the Borough of Scarborough, it is now administered by the unitary North Yorkshire Council.

The actress Joanne Froggatt was born and raised in Littlebeck.
