= The Disappointments Room =

2016 American psychological horror film

- Theatrical release poster
- Directed by: D. J. Caruso
- Written by: D. J. Caruso; Wentworth Miller
- Produced by: Geyer Kosinski; Vincent Newman; Tucker Tooley
- Starring: Kate Beckinsale; Mel Raido; Gerald McRaney; Lucas Till
- Cinematography: Rogier Stoffers
- Edited by: Vince Filippone
- Music by: Brian Tyler
- Production companies: Demarest; Los Angeles Media Fund; Media Talent Group; Relativity Studios
- Distributed by: Rogue; Relativity Media
- Release date: September 9, 2016 (United States)
- Running time: 85 minutes
- Country: United States
- Language: English
- Budget: $15 million
- Box office: $5.7 million

The Disappointments Room is a 2016 American psychological horror film directed by D. J. Caruso, written by Caruso and Wentworth Miller, and starring Kate Beckinsale and Mel Raido as a couple in a new house that contains a hidden room with a dark, haunted past. The film was inspired by an HGTV episode from a segment called "If Walls Could Talk" in which a Rhode Island woman discovered a secret attic room in her home used to conceal a disabled family member from elite society.

Originally completed in 2014, the film was only released on September 9, 2016 by EuropaCorp Distribution and Rogue.

== Plot ==
An architect named Dana Barrow (Kate Beckinsale) moves with her husband David and their 5-year-old son Lucas from Brooklyn to the Blacker estate in rural North Carolina, once a grand dream home that has sat abandoned since the death of the original owners in the 19th century. Upon arrival, Dana begins having unsettling visions and nightmares of a mysterious German Shepherd and Lucas covered in blood. She finds a homemade gravestone on the grounds and an area of the house not listed in the blueprints: a room whose entrance is blocked by a large chifforobe. The couple push it out of the way only to find a locked door. Dana finds the key on top of the door frame and enters the room, experiencing a vision of a little girl being tormented by her father and his German Shepherd. She suffers a nervous breakdown.

Later it is revealed that the couple not only had Lucas, but also a daughter; Catherine, who died a year before.

Shaken by her experience, Dana researches the history of the house, learning about its namesake Judge Ernest Blacker and his daughter, Laura Blacker, who died the same day that Dana's daughter was born, July 5. Local historian Judith tells her the Blacker family had a secret "disappointments room" in the attic, where wealthy socialite families cruelly shuttered away their deformed or disabled children. As she spends more time researching the house, Dana's mental state begins to unravel, and she stops taking her medication. She begins having disturbing visions of Laura, Judge Blacker, and the dog, and acts erratically toward David and Lucas. She finds a hidden portrait of Judge Blacker and Mrs. Blacker and burns them.

While David entertains family friends on the occasion of what would have been Catherine's first birthday, Dana hires local handyman Ben Philips to dig up the grave in the backyard. The ghost of Judge Blacker kills Ben with a shovel and Dana discovers his body hanging from a noose above the open grave. Inside the grave sits Laura's deformed skeleton.

In the attic, she finds the portraits she burned completely intact. Entering the disappointments' room, she witnesses a flashback of Judge Blacker murdering Laura with a hammer, as his wife tries to stop him. Blacker's dog attacks Dana; she breaks the dog's neck and stops Blacker from killing her son by bashing Blacker with the hammer. In the meantime, Laura's ghost is finally free and runs away from the house and vanishes.

David rushes in, seeing Dana frantically hitting the bed with Lucas in it. He takes Lucas to their bedroom, then returns to talk to Dana.

Calming down, Dana reflects on Catherine's death, a flashback reveals that Catherine died after being suffocated after her mother had fallen asleep over her. She realizes that she can no longer tell what's real when she realizes that she was hallucinating Ben's murder and his corpse. David vows that they will return to Brooklyn, and that Dana will get better. Before leaving, David removes the door from the disappointments' room, and Dana takes one of Laura's figurines. As they drive away, Dana spots Judge Blacker looking down at them from the window.

== Cast ==
- Kate Beckinsale as Dana Barrow
- Mel Raido as David Barrow
- Gerald McRaney as Judge Ernest R. Blacker
- Lucas Till as Ben Philips Jr.
- Duncan Joiner as Lucas Barrow
- Michael Landes as Teddy
- Michaela Conlin as Jules
- Celia Weston as Marti Morrinson
- Ella Jones as Laura Blacker
- Marcia DeRousse as Judith
- Joely Fisher as Dr. Asher
- Jennifer Leigh Mann as Mrs. Blacker

== Production ==
The production on the film began on September 8, 2014, in Greensboro, North Carolina. On October 20, Kate Beckinsale, Mel Raido and Michaela Conlin were filmed outside buildings on South Elm Street in Greensboro. The same buildings were used for exteriors, but the interior filming for the scenes represented by those buildings took place on Fourth Street in nearby Winston-Salem. The house used for the main location was the English Tudor style Adamsleigh estate, built in 1930 and designed by Luther Lashmit, at Sedgefield Country Club outside Greensboro. The film's special make-up effects were provided by KNB EFX.

During the film's lengthy post-production process, a number of key scenes and subplots were either trimmed or cut entirely. These include a flashback sequence of a garden party held by the Blackers while Laura hopelessly looks on from the attic, and a scene of Mrs. Blacker being killed by her husband's dog as retaliation for trying to save Laura.

== Release ==
The film was seeking a distributor after Relativity Media filed for Chapter 11 bankruptcy, and placed the film up for sale. Later, Relativity Media scheduled the film for a March 25, 2016, release. On March 14, 2016, it was revealed that Kidnap would be the first post-bankruptcy release in August of that year, pushing The Disappointments Room and Before I Wake off the release schedule. When Relativity Media revealed their new film schedule, The Disappointments Room was moved to November 18, 2016. It was then pushed up to September 9, 2016, with Rogue Pictures distributing the film with a planned VOD release only for the VOD release to get scrapped. The movie was added to Netflix in the United States on April 19, 2017.

=== Box office ===
In the United States, The Disappointments Room was released on September 9, 2016, alongside Sully, When the Bough Breaks and The Wild Life, and was projected to gross $1–2 million from 1,554 theaters in its opening weekend. It went on to gross $1.4 million in its opening weekend, finishing 17th at the box office. In the second week the film, still playing in those 1,554 theaters, grossed just $377,322, dropping to 24th place.

In its third week, The Disappointments Room was dropped from all but 36 theaters (97.4%). This set a record for highest percentage of theaters dropping a film in its third week, surpassing the 97.2% by the infamous flop Gigli. By the fourth week, only ten theaters were still showing the film, bringing in just $3,749.

=== Critical response ===
On the review aggregator website Rotten Tomatoes, 0% of 27 critics' reviews are positive, with an average rating of 3.2/10. The website's consensus reads: "The Disappointments Room lives down to its title with a thrill-free thriller that presumably left its stars filled with regret - and threatens to do the same for audiences." On Metacritic, the film has a score 31 out of 100, based on 7 critics, indicating "generally unfavorable reviews". Audiences polled by CinemaScore gave the film an average grade of "D" on an A+ to F scale.

Joe Leydon of Variety wrote: "Despite Kate Beckinsale's game efforts, D.J. Caruso's thriller proves altogether worthy of its title". Leydon wrote that the film starts well but "skids off the rails" around the two-thirds mark, and praised the cinematography and Beckinsale's performance, but said the film lives down to its name. Stephen Farber of The Hollywood Reporter criticized the film's lack of originality, saying: "There simply isn't enough freshness in the script to warrant another journey inside a dark old house."

== See also ==
- List of films with a 0% rating on Rotten Tomatoes
