= Jake Arnott =

British novelist and dramatist

Jake Arnott FRSL
- Born: 11 March 1961 (age 65); Buckinghamshire, England
- Education: Aylesbury Grammar School
- Occupation: Novelist
- Notable work: The Long Firm (1999)

Jake Arnott FRSL (born 11 March 1961) is a British novelist and dramatist, author of The Long Firm (1999) and six other novels.

== Life ==
Arnott was born in Buckinghamshire, England. Having left Aylesbury Grammar School at the age of 17, he had various jobs including as labourer, mortuary technician, artist's model, theatrical agency assistant, and actor both with the Red Ladder Theatre Company in Leeds and appearing as a mummy in the 1999 film The Mummy. He lived in squats such as Bonnington Square in south London, and came out as bisexual in his twenties. In 2005, Arnott was ranked one of Britain's 100 most influential LGBT people.

In 2026, Arnott was elected a Fellow of the Royal Society of Literature.

== Works ==
All of the novels by Arnott are engaged in the excavation of secret histories in the teasing out and restoration of events that have taken place beneath the surface of society.

- The Long Firm (1999) tells of Harry Starks, a homosexual East End gangster in the 1960s. It includes references to many real-life characters of the time, including the Kray twins, Tom Driberg, and Judy Garland. A notable feature is that the story is told from five different points of view. It was adapted as a BBC 2 TV series starring Derek Jacobi, Phil Daniels and Mark Strong, broadcast in July 2004 and nominated for six BAFTA Awards, winning two.
- He Kills Coppers (2001) tells of a criminal on the run, based on real-life cop killer Harry Roberts, the tale starting in 1966, the year of England's World Cup triumph, through to the Margaret Thatcher era, the Greenham Common protests of the 1980s and the Poll Tax Riots. It was later adapted for television, appearing on ITV1 in the UK in March and April 2008.
- truecrime (2003) takes up the story of a gangster found dead at Starks's Spanish villa at the end of The Long Firm. The dead man's daughter wants to flush out Harry Starks, whom she suspects of the murder. She is an actress and uses the making of a film about old time British gangsters as a means of tempting his appearance.
- Johnny Come Home (2006) shifts from a focus on the criminal underworld to the early 1970s with a plot involving The Angry Brigade and a glam rock star inspired by Gary Glitter. Johnny Come Home had been withdrawn from sale in the UK due to the presence of a villainous former bandleader named Tony Rocco; there is a real former bandleader of that name, who objected to the character's name. The book has now been reissued with the character's name changed to Timothy Royal.
- The Devil's Paintbrush (2009) is set in Paris, France, in 1903, and deals with an encounter between disgraced homosexual former British Army officer Sir Hector MacDonald and the occultist Aleister Crowley.
- The House of Rumour (2012) is set in London, Southern California and Munich during the Second World War and its aftermath. An American SF writer founds a new religion, a rocket scientist dabbles in the black arts and Rudolf Hess makes his dramatic night flight to Scotland after consulting astrologists. Described by the critic Mark Lawson as "A conspiracy thriller filled with bewildering connections, dark conjecture and arcane information, The House of Rumour perhaps most resembles The Da Vinci Code, rewritten by an author with the gifts of characterisation, wit and literacy."
- Doctor Who: A Handful of Stardust (2014) features the sixth incarnation of the Doctor from the popular TV Sci-Fi Series. It was released as part of the "Time Trips" range, which featured works by authors who have never written for the character before.
- The Visa Affair (2016), commissioned radio play for BBC Radio 3 in October 2016. The story of how Joe Orton struggled to get a US visa to visit the Broadway production of his play Entertaining Mr Sloane in 1965.
- The Fatal Tree (2017) is set in 18th-century London and follows stories that relate to "The Fatal Tree" i.e. the gallows at Tyburn. The Guardian called it a "Colourful descent into the underworld...absolutely gripping". According to an interview in the Scottish Sunday Herald, "Arnott originally pitched the book as "Moll Flanders meets A Clockwork Orange", owing to its significant use of 18th-century London street slang. The Evening Standard described it as "a phantasmagoric walk on the Wild side".
- Blood Rival (2025), a gangster murder mystery based on Oedipus.
- Arnott has also sold a folk horror novel, Netherwood, to be published in 2026.

== Bibliography ==
=== Novels ===
- —— (1999). The Long Firm (hardcover 1st ed.). London: Sceptre.
- —— (2001). He Kills Coppers (hardcover 1st ed.). London: Sceptre.
- —— (2003). truecrime (paperback ed.). London: Sceptre. ISBN 9781569473733.
- —— (2006). Johnny Come Home (hardcover 1st ed.). London: Sceptre.
- —— (2009). The Devil's Paintbrush (hardcover 1st ed.). London: Sceptre.
- —— (2012). The House of Rumour (hardcover ed.). London: Sceptre. ISBN 9780340922729.
- —— (2017). The Fatal Tree (hardcover 1st ed.). London: Sceptre.
- —— (2025). Blood Rival (paperback ed.). London: Datura.

==== Media tie-ins ====
- —— (2014). Doctor Who: A Handful of Stardust (paperback ed.). London: BBC Books.
