= Lighton =

Lighton is a surname. Notable people with the surname include:

- Harry Lighton (born 1992), English film director and screenwriter
- Louis D. Lighton (1895–1963), American screenwriter
- Lighton Baronets, a title in the Baronetage of Ireland

== See also ==
- John Lighton Synge, Irish mathematician with middle name
