= Viyon Awhanse =

Nigerian filmmaker and producer

Viyon Eso Awhanse is a Nigerian filmmaker, producer and cultural exponent, best known for his works in the African cinema and the cultural heritage of Badagry in Lagos State, Nigeria. He is the organizer and creative director of the Badagry International Film Festival (BIFIF).

== Career ==
As a filmmaker and producer, Awhanse’s works include Sèblá (Destiny), a thriller short film based on an original story written by him. The film, which was commissioned by Mnet Africa Magic and aired on Showmax in 2022, was set in his native Badagry town and Gun/Fon language. The short film was selected for screening at the 2022 Africa International Film Festival (AFRIFF) in Lagos. Sèblá was shortlisted for the 2024 The Filmjoint Awards for the Best Indigenous Film and Best Sound Overall.

Awhanse has also been credited for his role as a fixer and transport manager for Lady (2026), and for My Father's Shadow, a 2025 drama featured in the 2025 Cannes selection and received the BAFTA Award for Outstanding Debut, the British Independent Film Awards, and the Gotham Independent Film Award.

In 2026, Awhanse directed Gateway City, a documentary exploring Badagry’s rich history in Lagos State, which premiered was nominated for a special screening at the 15th iREP International Documentary Film Festival.

Beyond film making, Awhanse founded the Badagry International Film Cultural and Sports Festival (BIFIF) in 2023 with aim of repositioning Badagry within the film industry and making it attractive for local and international tourists through audio-visual storytelling.
