= Thomas Lighton =

Thomas Lighton may refer to:

- Sir Thomas Lighton, 1st Baronet (died 1805), Ulster Scots banker and politician
- Sir Thomas Lighton, 2nd Baronet (1787–1816), of the Lighton baronets
- Sir Thomas Lighton, 3rd Baronet (1814–1817), of the Lighton baronets
- Sir Thomas Hamilton Lighton, 9th Baronet (born 1954), of the Lighton baronets
