= British Independent Film Awards 2025 =

Awards ceremony

28th British Independent Film Awards
- Awarded for: Best in British independent film
- Date: 30 November 2025
- Site: Roundhouse, London
- Official website: www.bifa.film

Highlights
- Best Film: Pillion
- Most awards: Pillion / Warfare (4)
- Most nominations: My Father's Shadow (12)

The British Independent Film Awards 2025 was held on 30 November 2025 to recognise the best in British independent cinema and filmmaking talent from United Kingdom. The ceremony took place once again at the Roundhouse in London.

The shortlists for multiple categories, including Best International Independent Film and Breakthrough Performance were revealed through October 2025. The nominations were announced on 3 November 2025 by Ben Hardy and Saura Lightfoot-Leon at One Hundred Shoreditch, London. Akinola Davies Jr.'s debut feature My Father's Shadow led the nominations with 12, followed by Pillion and I Swear with 10 and 9 respectively. The award for Best Ensemble Performance was re-introduced after being last presented in 2022 as a competitive category.

Both Pillion and Warfare received the most awards with four each, with the former also receiving the award for Best British Independent Film.

== Winners and nominees ==
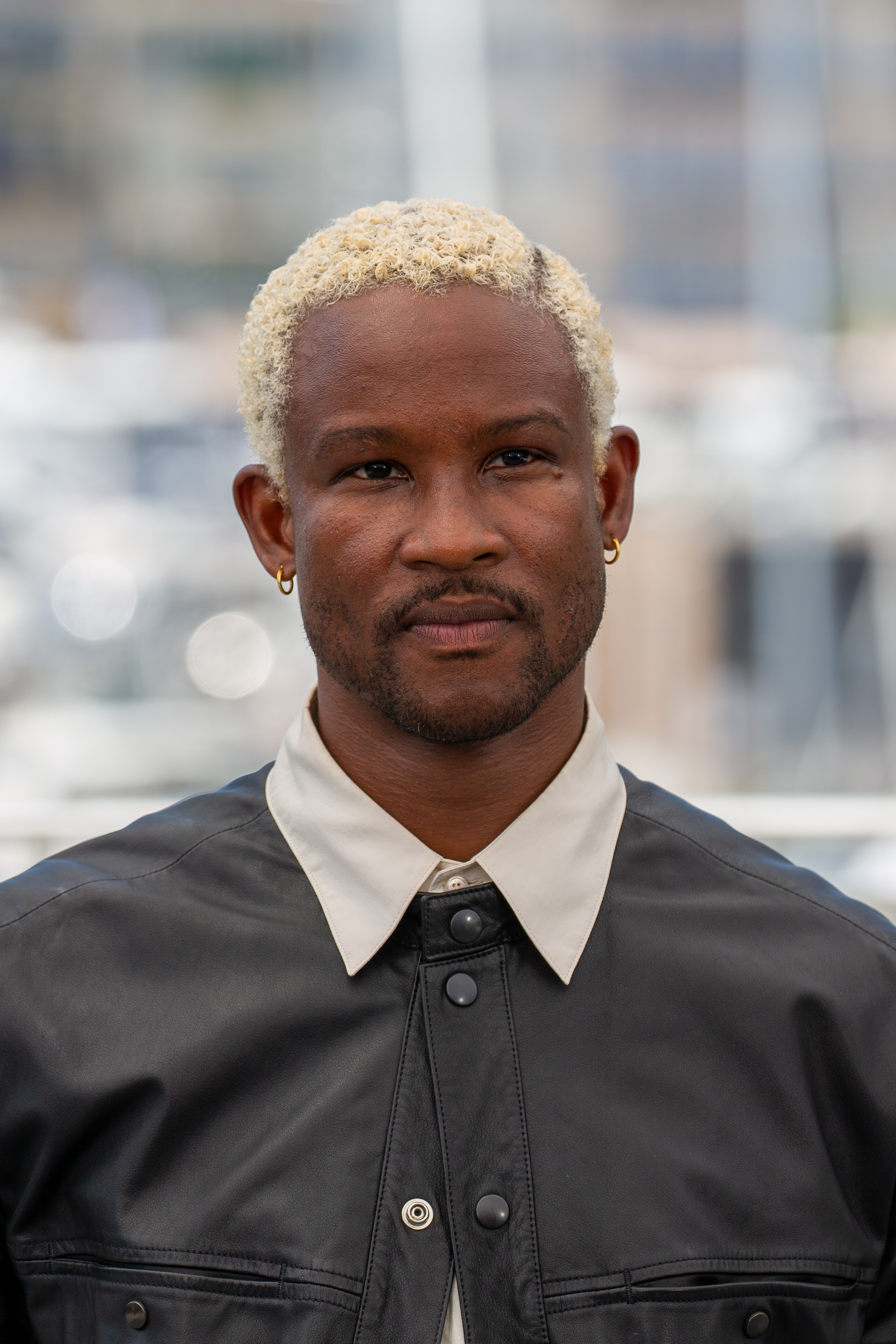
Akinola Davies Jr., Best Director winner

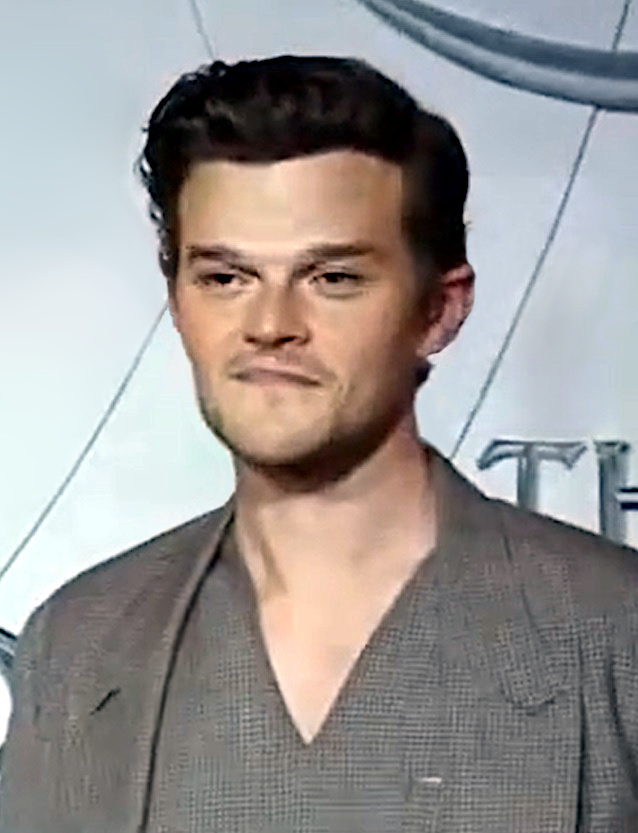
Robert Aramayo, Best Lead Performance winner

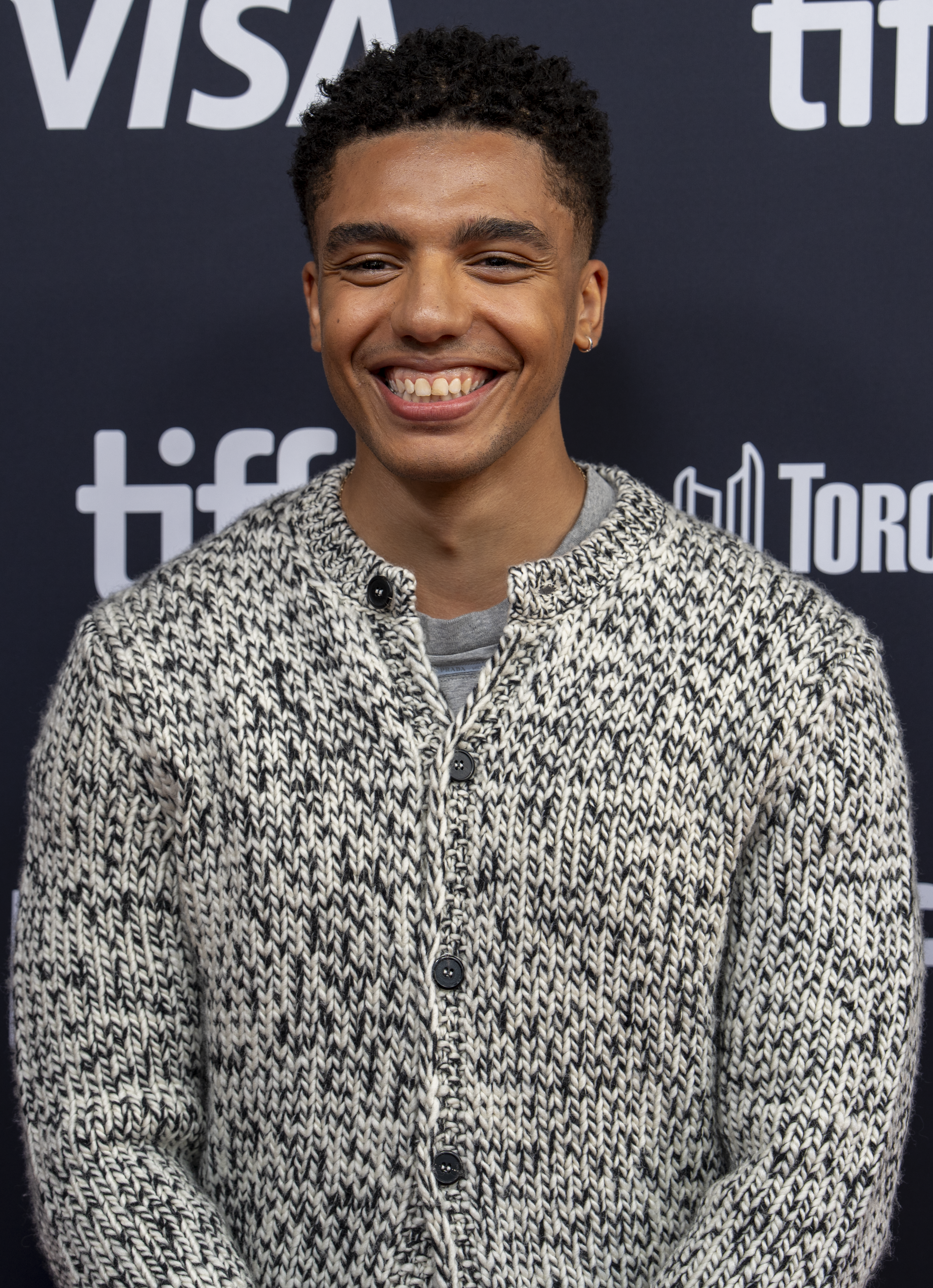
Jay Lycurgo, Best Supporting Performance winner

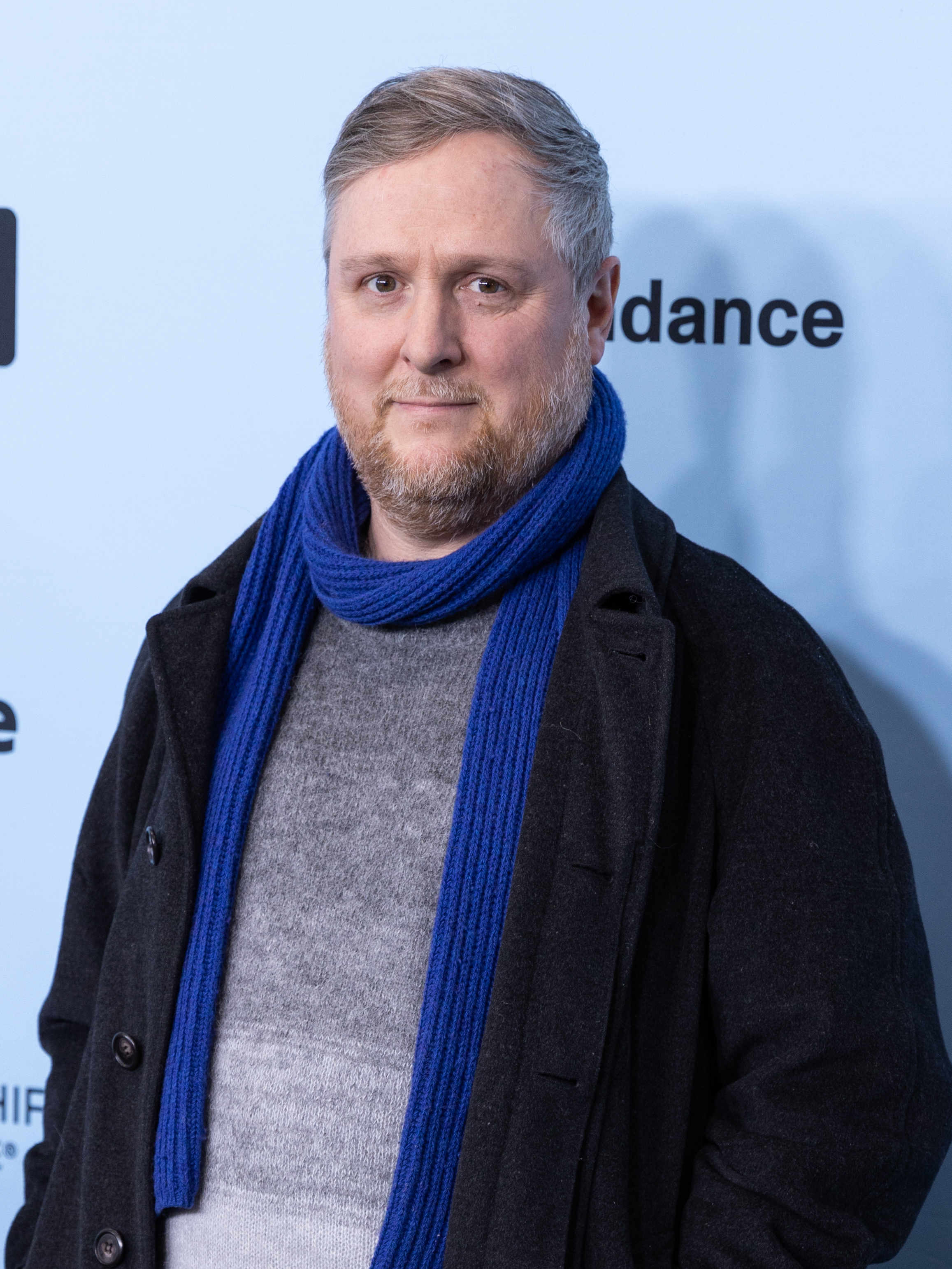
Tim Key, Best Joint Lead Performance co-winner

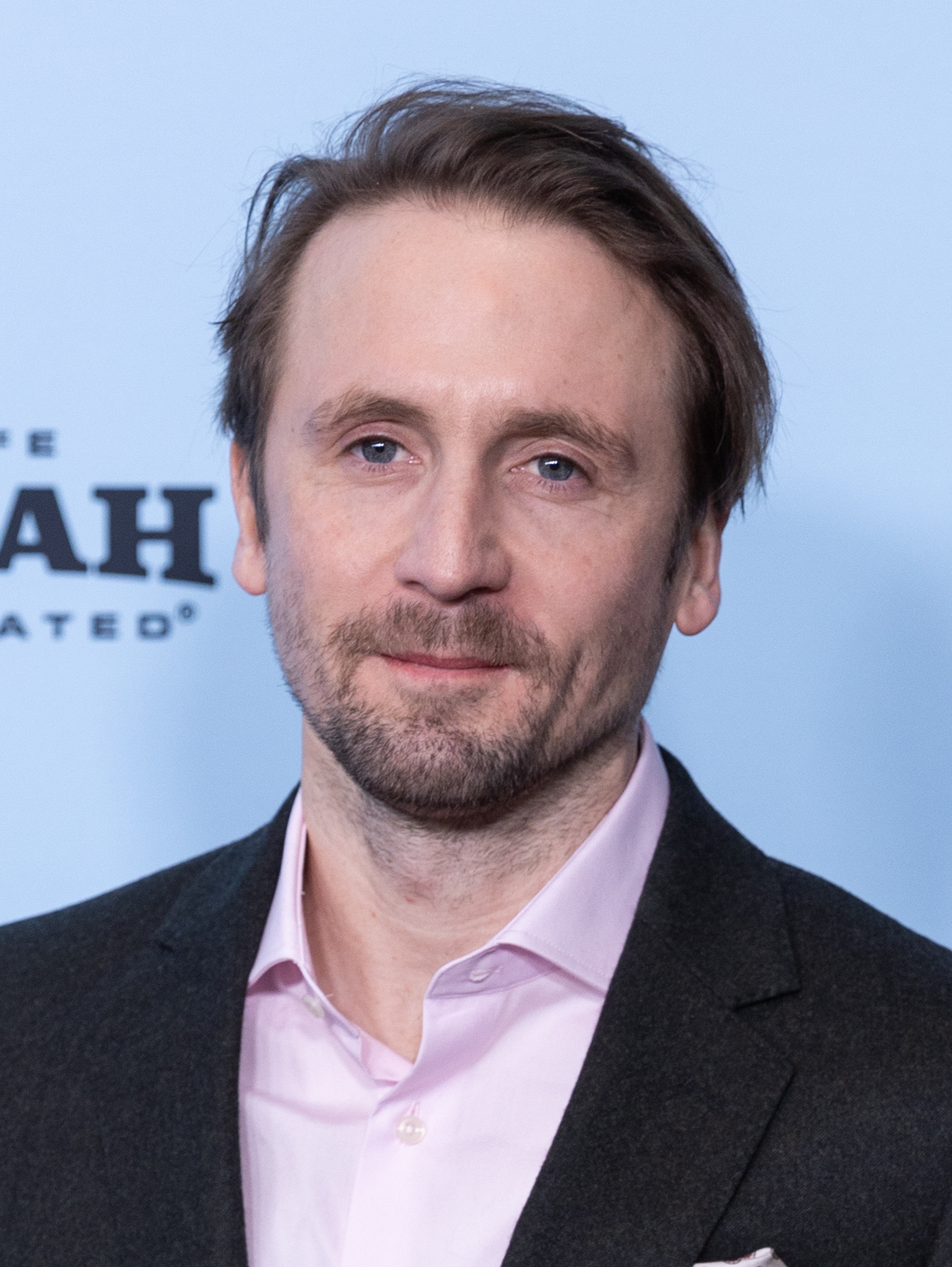
Tom Basden, Best Joint Lead Performance co-winner

Best British Independent Film	Best Director
Pillion – Harry Lighton, Lee Groombridge, Ed Guiney, Andrew Lowe and Emma Norton; The Ballad of Wallis Island – James Griffiths, Tom Basden, Tim Key and Rupert Majendie; I Swear – Kirk Jones, Georgia Bayliff and Piers Tempest; My Father's Shadow – Akinola Davies Jr., Wale Davies, Rachel Dargavel and Funmbi Ogunbanwo; Urchin – Harris Dickinson, Archie Pearch and Scott O'Donnell	Akinola Davies Jr. – My Father's Shadow; Laura Carreira – On Falling; Kirk Jones – I Swear; Harry Lighton – Pillion; Lynne Ramsay – Die My Love
Best Lead Performance	Best Supporting Performance
Robert Aramayo – I Swear as John Davidson; Frank Dillane – Urchin as Mike; David Jonsson – Wasteman as Taylor; Jennifer Lawrence – Die My Love as Grace; Harry Melling – Pillion as Colin; Cillian Murphy – Steve as Steve	Jay Lycurgo – Steve as Shy; Tom Blyth – Wasteman as Dee; Scott Ellis Watson – I Swear as young John Davidson; Peter Mullan – I Swear as Tommy Trotter; Maxine Peake – I Swear as Dottie Achenbach; Alexander Skarsgård – Pillion as Ray
Best Joint Lead Performance	Breakthrough Performance
Tim Key and Tom Basden – The Ballad of Wallis Island as Charles Heath and Herb McGwyer; Ebada Hassan and Safiyya Ingar – Brides as Doe and Muna; Andrea Riseborough and Brenda Blethyn – Dragonfly as Colleen and Elsie	Posy Sterling – Lollipop as Molly Brown; Scott Ellis Watson – I Swear as young John Davidson; Ebada Hassan – Brides as Doe; Safiyya Ingar – Brides as Muna; Connor Tompkins – The Son and the Sea as Charlie
Best Screenplay	Best Documentary
The Ballad of Wallis Island – Tom Basden, Tim Key; On Falling – Laura Carreira; My Father's Shadow – Wale Davies; I Swear – Kirk Jones; Pillion – Harry Lighton	A Want in Her – Myrid Carten, Tadhg O’Sullivan, Roisin Geraghty and Kat Mansoor; Antidote – James Jones and David Moulton; Mother Vera – Cecile Embleton, Alys Tomlinson and Laura Shacham; Motherboard – Victoria Mapplebeck; The Shepherd and the Bear – Max Keegan, Elizabeth Woodward, Amanda McBaine and Jesse Moss
Best International Independent Film	Best Short Film
Sentimental Value – Joachim Trier, Eskil Vogt, Maria Ekerhovd and Andrea Berentsen Ottmar; It Was Just an Accident – Jafar Panahi and Phillippe Martin; Sirāt – Óliver Laxe, Santiago Fillol, Domingo Corral, Oriol Maymo, Andrea Queralt, Mani Mortazavi, Xavi Font, Pedro Almodóvar, Agustín Almodóvar and Esther García; Sorry, Baby – Eva Victor, Adele Romanski, Mark Ceryak and Barry Jenkins; Sound of Falling – Mascha Schilinski, Louise Pete, Maren Schmitt and Lucas Schmidt	Magid / Zafar – Luis Hindman, Sufiyaan Salam and Aidan Robert Brooks; Flock – Mac Nixon, Matt Ashwell and Daley Nixon; A Sisyphean Task – Gus Flind-Henry, George Malcher and George Telfer; Stomach Bug – Matty Crawford and Karima Sammout Kanellopoulou; Two Black Boys in Paradise – Ben Jackson, Baz Sells and Dean Atta
Best Casting	Best Cinematography
I Swear – Lauren Evans; Brides – Shaheen Baig; Urchin – Shaheen Baig; Warfare – Kharmel Cochrane; Steve – Robert Sterne	Die My Love – Seamus McGarvey; H Is for Hawk – Charlotte Bruus Christensen; My Father's Shadow – Jermaine Edwards; Mother Vera – Cecile Embleton; A Pale View of Hills – Piotr Niemyjski
Best Costume Design	Best Editing
Pillion – Grace Snell; 100 Nights of Hero – Susie Coulthard; Tornado – Kirsty Halliday; A Pale View of Hills – Sayaka Takahashi and Matthew Price; My Father's Shadow – PC Williams	Warfare – Fin Oates; LifeHack – Ronan Corrigan and Aleksandr Kletsov; My Father's Shadow – Omar Guzman Castro; One to One: John & Yoko – Sam Rice-Edwards; Pillion – Gareth C. Scales
Best Effects	Best Make-Up & Hair Design
Warfare – Simon Stanley-Clamp and Ryan Conder; Die My Love – Victor Tomi; The Thing with Feathers – Hayley Williams, Conor O'Sullivan and Martin Malmqvist	Pillion – Diandra Ferreira; My Father's Shadow – Kehinde Are and Feyzo Oyebisi; Warfare – Paul Gooch and Tristan Versluis; Die My Love – Colleen Labaff and Miho Suzuki; 100 Nights of Hero – Natasha Lawes
Best Original Music	Best Music Supervision
The Ballad of Wallis Island – Tom Basden and Adem Ilhan; Anemone – Bobby Krlic; Tornado – Jed Kurzel; My Father's Shadow – CJ Mirra; Ocean with David Attenborough – Steven Price	Die My Love – Ian Neil and Raife Burchell; Wasteman – Phil Canning; Urchin – Bridget Samuels
Best Production Design	Best Sound
Harvest – Nathan Parker; My Father's Shadow – Jennifer Anti and Pablo Anti; Warfare – Mark Digby; Die My Love – Tim Grimes; 100 Nights of Hero – Sofia Sacomani	Warfare – Sound team; Anemone – Steve Fanagan and Stevie Haywood; Die My Love – Tim Burns, Paul Davies, Linda Forsén, Andrew Stirk and Ron Osiowy; Ish – Nina Hartstone, Jake Whitelee, Jens Petersen, Mike Tehrani and Rob Davidson; My Father's Shadow – CJ Mirra, James Ridgway, Joe Jackson, Adele Fletcher and Pius Fatoke
Douglas Hickox Award (Best Debut Director)	Best Debut Screenwriter
Cal McMau – Wasteman; Laura Carreira – On Falling; Akinola Davies Jr. – My Father's Shadow; Harris Dickinson – Urchin; Harry Lighton – Pillion	Harry Lighton – Pillion; Hunter Andrews and Eoin Doran – Wasteman; Tom Basden and Tim Key – The Ballad of Wallis Island; Laura Carreira – On Falling; Wale Davies – My Father's Shadow
Breakthrough Producer	The Raindance Maverick Award
Dhiraj Mahey – Ish [also produced by Bennett McGhee]; Wyn Baptiste – Shoot the People; Charlotte Knowles – Palestine Comedy Club; Joann Kushner – LifeHack [also produced by Timur Bekmambetov and Aleksandr Kletzov]; Archie Pearch – Urchin [also produced by Scott O’Donnell]	A Want in Her – Myrid Carten; Foul Evil Deeds – Richard Hunter; Holloway – Sophie Compton, Daisy-May Hudson, Stella Heath Keir, Alice Hughes and Polly Creed; Mother Vera – Cecile Embleton, Alys Tomlinson and Laura Shacham; Motherboard – Victoria Mapplebeck
Best Debut Director – Feature Documentary
Myrid Carten – A Want in Her; Cecile Embleton and Alys Tomlinson – Mother Vera; Victoria Mapplebeck – Motherboard
Best Ensemble Performance
Warfare – D'Pharaoh Woon-A-Tai, Will Poulter, Cosmo Jarvis, Kit Connor, Finn Bennett, Joseph Quinn and Charles Melton

=== Films with multiple nominations and awards ===
Films that received multiple nominations
Nominations	Film
12	My Father's Shadow
10	Pillion
9	I Swear
8	Die My Love
7	Warfare
6	Urchin
5	The Ballad of Wallis Island
5	Wasteman
4	Brides
4	Mother Vera
4	On Falling
3	100 Nights of Hero
3	A Want in Her
3	Motherboard
3	Steve
2	Anemone
2	A Pale View of Hills
2	Ish
2	LifeHack
2	Tornado

Films that received multiple awards
Awards	Film
4	Pillion
4	Warfare
3	A Want in Her
3	The Ballad of Wallis Island
2	Die My Love
2	I Swear
