= Gotham Independent Film Award for Best Adapted Screenplay =

Film award

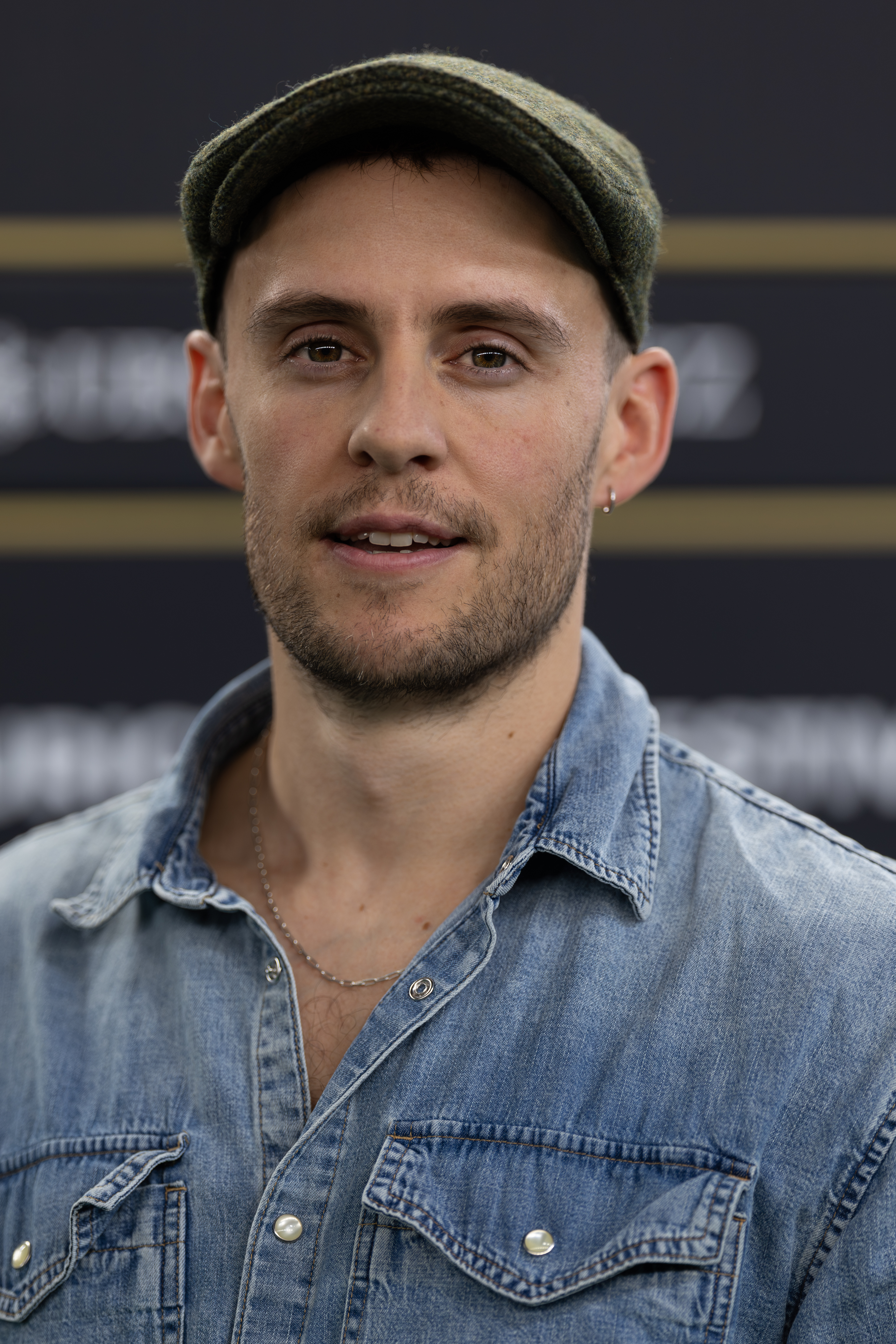
- 2025 recipient: Harry Lighton
- Country: United States
- Presented by: The Gotham Film & Media Institute
- First award: 2025
- Currently held by: Harry Lighton for Pillion

The Gotham Independent Film Award for Best Adapted Screenplay, first awarded in 2025 as part of the Gotham Independent Film Awards, in an annual film award. With the Gotham Independent Film Award for Best Original Screenplay, it replaced the Gotham Independent Film Award for Best Screenplay category.

== Winners and nominees ==
=== 2020s ===
Year	Screenwriter(s)	Film	Source Material	Ref.
2025	Harry Lighton	Pillion	Box Hill (novel) by Adam Mars-Jones	
2025	Park Chan-wook, Lee Kyoung-Mi, Jahye Lee, and Don McKellar	No Other Choice	The Ax (novel) by Donald E. Westlake	
2025	Paul Thomas Anderson	One Battle After Another	Vineland (novel) by Thomas Pynchon	
2025	Martyna Majok	Preparation for the Next Life	Preparation for the Next Life (novel) by Atticus Lish	
2025	Clint Bentley and Greg Kwedar	Train Dreams	Train Dreams (novella) by Denis Johnson	
2026	Ryusuke Hamaguchi	All of a Sudden	You and I – The Illness Suddenly Get Worse (book) by Makiko Miyano and Maho Isono	
2026	Chuko Esiri	Clarissa	Mrs Dalloway (novel) by Virginia Woolf	
2026	Rashida Jones and Will McCormack	The Invite	The People Upstairs (film) by Cesc Gay	
2026	Simon Lyashenko & Andrey Zvyagintsev	Minotaur	The Unfaithful Wife (film) by Claude Chabrol	
2026	Ajon Singh	Primetime	"Tonight on Dateline This Man Will Die" (article) by Luke Dittrich	

== See also ==
- Academy Award for Best Adapted Screenplay
- BAFTA Award for Best Adapted Screenplay
- Writers Guild of America Award for Best Adapted Screenplay
