= Box Hill (novel) =

2020 novella by Adam Mars-Jones

- Author: Adam Mars-Jones
- Genre: Literary fiction • LGBTQ literature
- Set in: 1975 London
- Publisher: New Directions Publishing Corporation
- Publication date: 1 September 2020
- Pages: 112
- ISBN: 9780811230056

Box Hill, subtitled A Story of Low Self-Esteem, is a 2020 novella by Adam Mars-Jones. It follows the story of then 18-year-old Colin who meets an older leather-clad biker, Ray, and enters into a BDSM relationship with him. The novella deals with topics like homophobia, consent, and self-esteem.

== Inspiration ==
Mars-Jones has said that he was inspired by Lolita's ambiguous depiction of abuse and consent.

== Synopsis ==
Colin and Ray meet while cruising at Box Hill near Dorking in 1975, a spot known for bikers on Sundays. It is Colin's 18th birthday. After bumping into Ray, Colin is forced to give him a blowjob. Ray later takes Colin home with him and rapes him. Colin describes being attracted to Ray, as well as wondering why Ray would be interested in him. Despite his discomfort, Colin ends up entering a long-term BDSM relationship as Ray's submissive. Colin and Ray date for over six years. Ray tells Colin very little information about himself: Colin does not know his occupation, birthday, or any other personal information. Ray is very controlling and makes Colin shave his head and throw out his toiletries. Colin integrates socially into the biker gang, and is forced to do sexual favors for the rest of the members. When Colin is 24, he goes on vacation with his family, and comes back to learn that Ray has died in a bike accident. Before passing away, Ray swore his friends into secrecy about where he would be buried. The novella ends with Colin still unsure of what really happened to Ray.

== Characters ==
- Colin, a shy, overweight young gay man who enters into an abusive, submissive relationship to Ray and his biker gang
- Ray, a biker, described as around a decade older than Colin, who is the dominant partner in their relationship.
- Joyce, Colin's older sister

== Adaptation ==
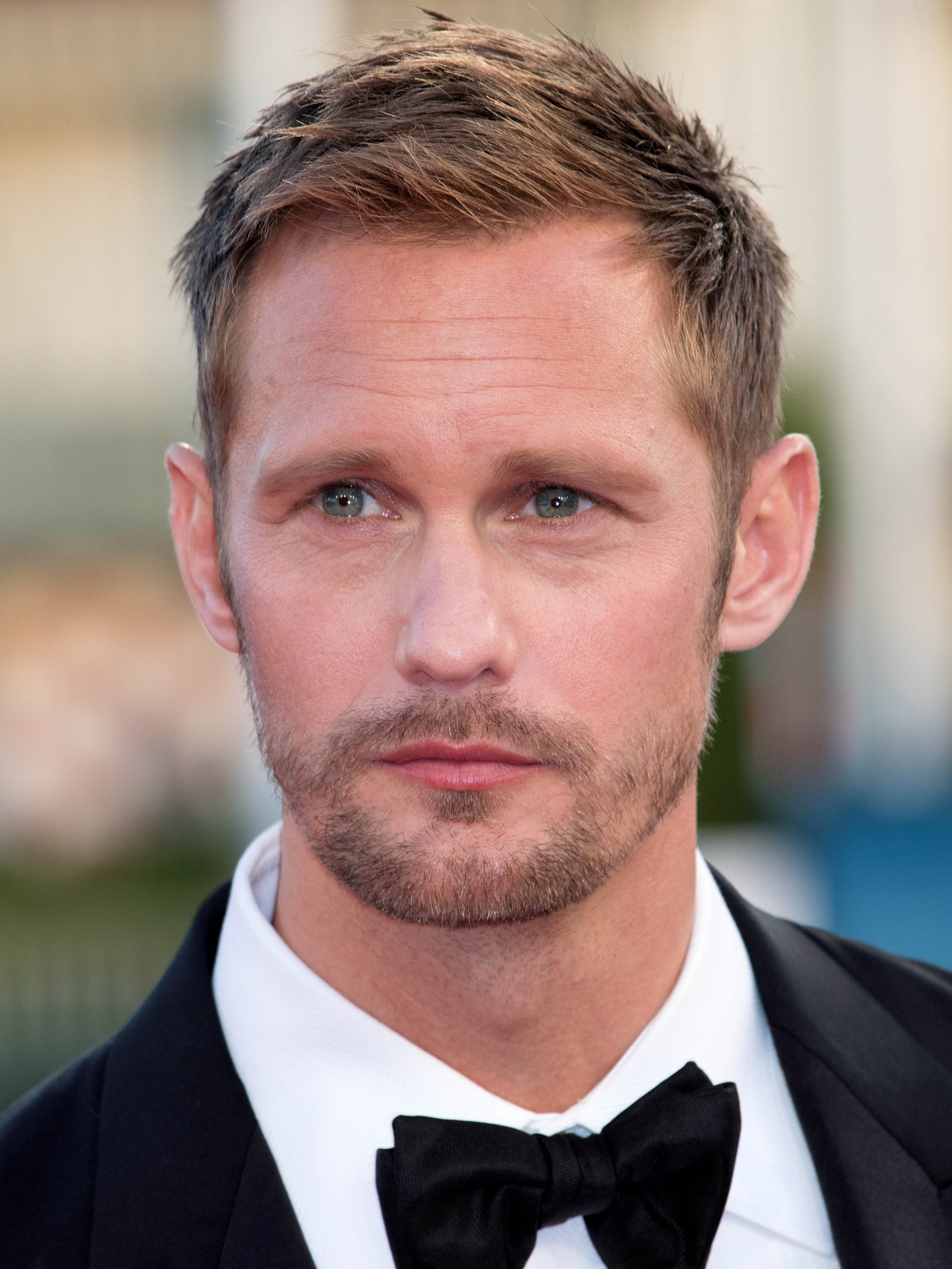
Alexander Skarsgård plays Ray in the 2025 film adaptation.

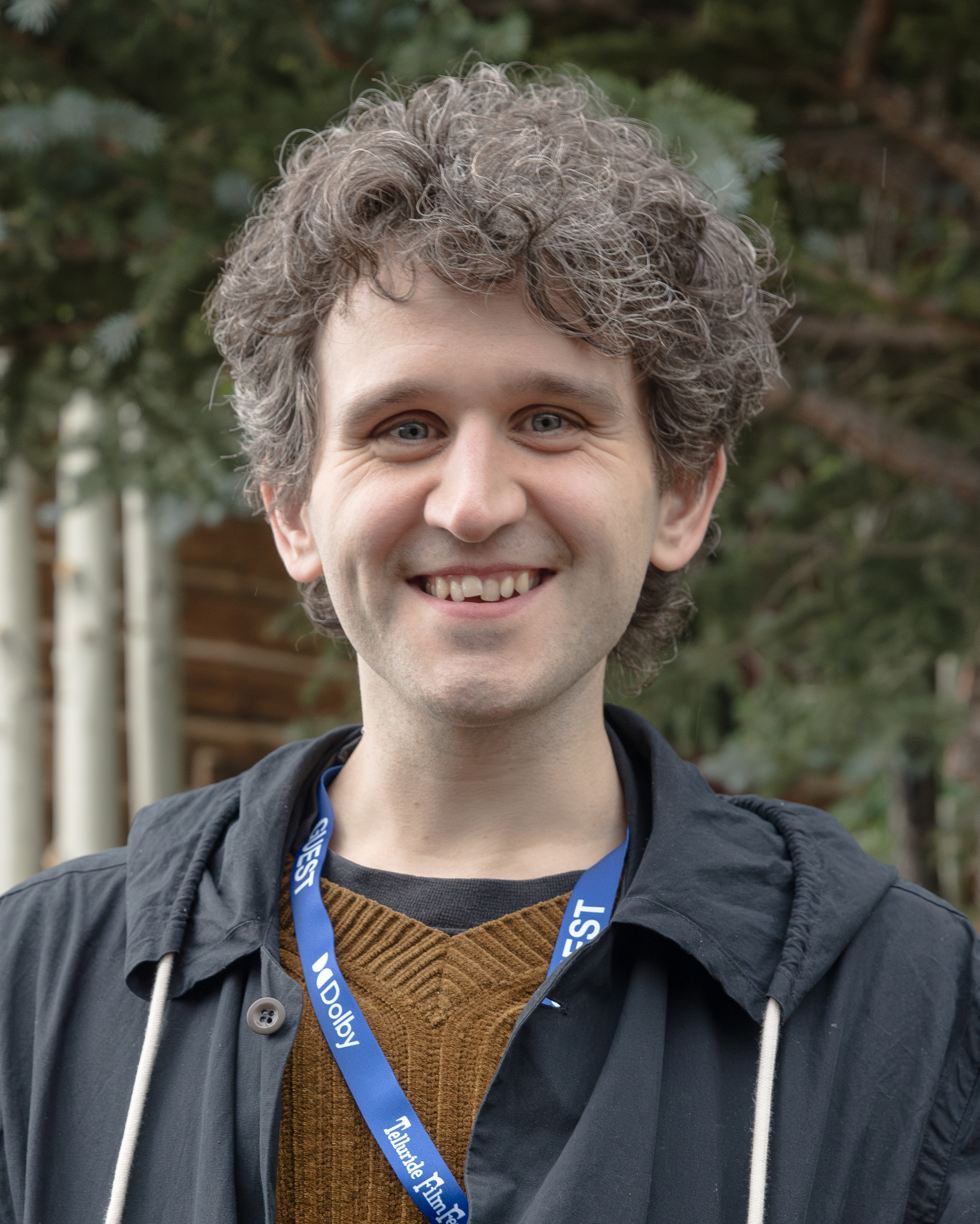
Harry Melling plays Colin in the film adaptation.

Box Hill was adapted into a 2025 film, Pillion, directed by Harry Lighton and produced by A24. A pillion refers to the secondary cushion on a motorcycle, meant for someone who sits behind the biker. Colin is played by Harry Melling and Ray is played by Alexander Skarsgård. Lighton, the director, said that he was sent Box Hill by Eva Yates, the head of film at the BBC. Lighton then approached Mars-Jones about a possible adaptation, who was initially skeptical.

=== Changes from the book ===
Both the characters of Ray and Colin were aged up for the movie: Ray is in his 40s, and Colin is 35. Pillion is also set in the present-day, rather than the 1970s, due to budget constraints. The movie additionally has a scene where Ray and Colin take a "day-off" from their BDSM dynamic. At the end of the movie, Ray does not die, but instead disappears and never contacts Colin again. Reviewers, along with Mars-Jones himself, have said that the movie is more light-hearted and comedic than the book.

On the topic of deviations from the book, Mars-Jones said:

I was not thinking there would be any of the essence of the DNA of the book there. And I'm not sure there is a lot of the DNA of it, but it's the source that Harry has transformed. I think it's more of a transformation than an adaptation.

== Awards ==
- 2019 Fitzcarraldo Editions Novel Prize
