= Akinola Davies Jr. =

British filmmaker, writer, and visual artist

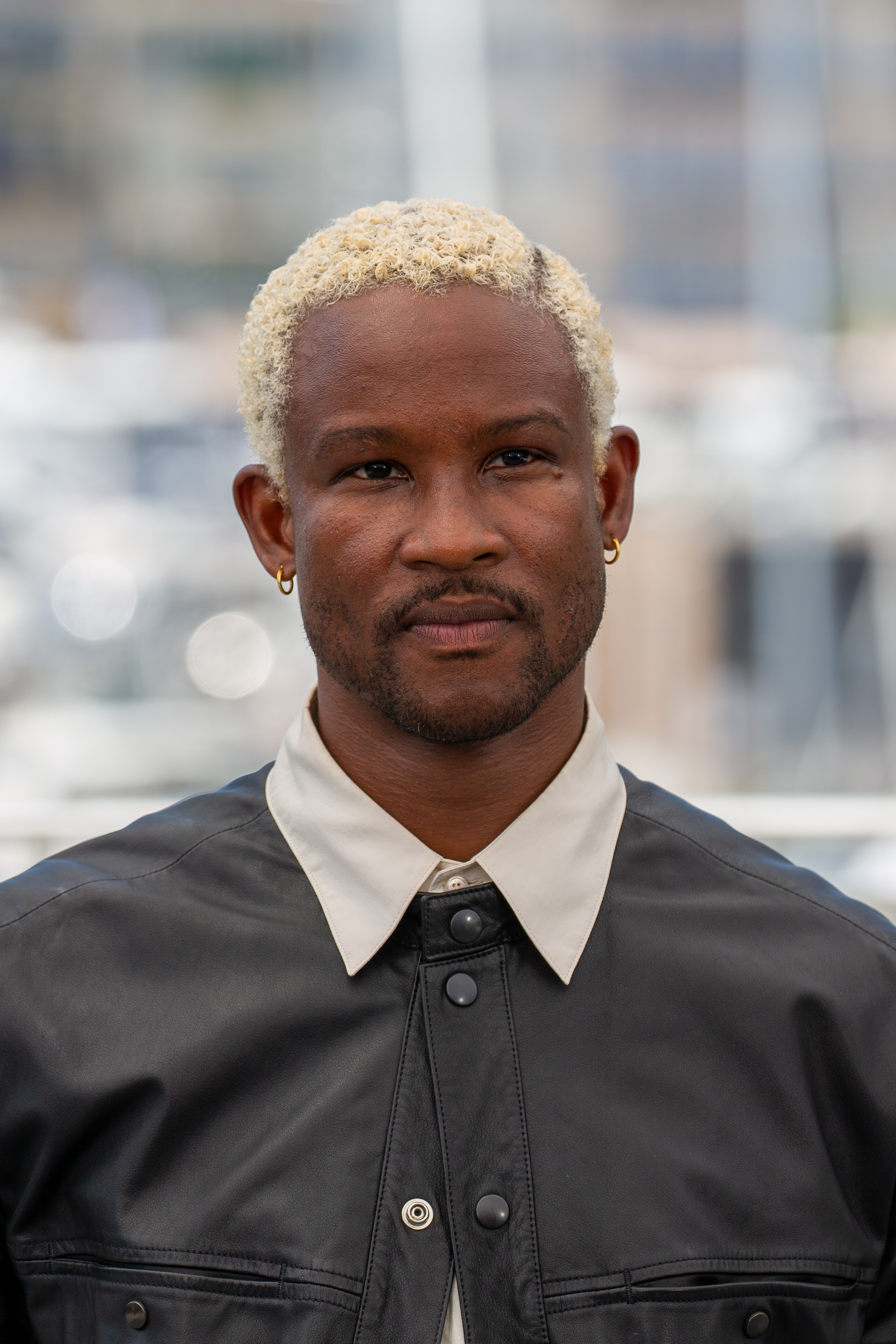
- Davies at the 2025 Cannes Film Festival
- Born: London, United Kingdom
- Citizenship: British; Nigerian
- Occupations: Film director, screenwriter
- Years active: 2018–present

Akinola Davies Jr. is a British-Nigerian filmmaker, writer, and visual artist. He is best known for his debut film My Father's Shadow, winning of a BAFTA Award for Outstanding Debut, a British Independent Film Award and a Gotham Independent Film Award.

== Early life and education ==
Davies was born in London and raised between there and Lagos, Nigeria, as well as the United States. He is Yoruba. He began his career assisting photographers and filmmakers before completing a workshop at the New York Film Academy in 2009.

== Career ==
He went on to start creating music videos and commercials for brands like Gucci, Acne Studios, Moncler, Kenzo, Mulberry, and Louis Vuitton.

His 2020 short film Lizard, inspired by his childhood in Nigeria won the Grand Jury Prize for Short Film at the 2021 Sundance Film Festival and was nominated for Best British Short Film at the 2021 BAFTA Awards. Lizard also received a nomination from the London Critics Circle Film Awards and was selected for the BFI London Film Festival and Raindance Film Festival.

In 2025, Davies made his feature-length directorial debut with My Father's Shadow, co-written with his brother Wale Davies. My Father's Shadow premiered in the Un Certain Regard section at the 2025 Cannes Film Festival, making history as the first Nigerian film selected for Cannes' official selection, winning the Caméra d'Or – Special Mention. The film also received severals nominations on awards shows, winning the British Independent Film Award for Best Director and the Gotham Independent Film Award for Breakthrough Director.

== Filmography ==
=== Film work ===
Year	Title	Credited as			Notes	Ref
Year	Title	Director	Writer	Producer	Notes	Ref
2018	Contactless	Yes	Yes	No	Short film	
2019	Black to Life	Yes	Yes	No	BBC TV series	
2020	Lizard	Yes	Yes	No	Sundance Grand Jury Prize winner	
2025	My Father's Shadow	Yes	Yes	No	Feature film debut	

== Awards and nominations ==
Award	Year	Category	Work	Result	Ref
BFI London Film Festival	2025	Sutherland Award	My Father's Shadow	Nominated	
British Academy Film Awards	2026	Outstanding Debut	My Father's Shadow	Won	
British Independent Film Award	2025	Best Director	My Father's Shadow	Won	
British Independent Film Award	2025	Douglas Hickox Award (Best Debut Director)	My Father's Shadow	Nominated	
Cannes Film Festival	2025	Un Certain Regard	My Father's Shadow	Nominated	
Cannes Film Festival	2025	Caméra d'Or – Special Mention	My Father's Shadow	Won	
Chicago International Film Festival	2025	Gold Hugo	My Father's Shadow	Nominated	
Chicago International Film Festival	2025	Special Mention	My Father's Shadow	Won	
Gotham Independent Film Awards	2025	Breakthrough Director	My Father's Shadow	Won	
International Film Festival of India	2025	Special Jury Award	My Father's Shadow	Won	
Seville European Film Festival	2025	Rampa Award	My Father's Shadow	Won	
Sundance Film Festival	2021	Short Film Grand Jury Prize	Lizard	Won	
