= The Son and the Sea =

American action drama film

- Directed by: Stroma Cairns
- Screenplay by: Stroma Cairns; Imogen West
- Produced by: Stroma Cairns; Imogen West
- Starring: Jonah West; Stanley Brock; Connor Tompkins
- Production companies: BBC Film; In The Company Of; Studio Cloy
- Release date: September 7, 2025 (TIFF)
- Countries: United Kingdom; United States
- Language: English

The Son and the Sea is a 2025 British-American independent film directed by Stroma Cairns, written by Stroma Cairns and Imogen West, produced by Imogen West and Kelly Peck, with a cast led by Jonah West, Stanley Brock and Connor Tompkins.

== Premise ==
A coming-of-age story of two best friends who leave London to visit the east coast of Scotland.

== Cast ==
- Jonah West as Jonah
- Stanley Brock as Lee
- Connor Tompkins as Charlie
- Lewis Tompkins as Luke
- Grant Lindsay as Sandy

== Production ==
The film is produced by British company In The Company Of and American company Studio Cloy. It was developed with BBC Film. Cairns co-wrote the film with her mother Imogen West and the film is starring her brother Jonah West alongside Stanley Brock, Grant Lindsay, and twin brothers Connor and Lewis Tompkins. It is the feature length directorial debut for Stroma Cairns, as well as the big screen debut for leading cast members Jonah West and Brock. Many of the cast are deaf and first-time actors. Principal photography took place on location in the village of Pennan in Aberdeenshire, Scotland.

== Release ==
The film premiered at the Toronto Film Festival in 2025 and was later shown at the San Sebastian Film Festival and in October 2025 at the 2025 BFI London Film Festival.

== Reception ==
For their roles in the film, Connor Tompkins was nominated and Jonah West and Stanley Brock were long-listed for the Breakthrough Performance at the British Independent Film Awards 2025.
