= Pillion (film) =

2025 film by Harry Lighton

- Theatrical release poster
- Directed by: Harry Lighton
- Written by: Harry Lighton
- Based on: Box Hill by Adam Mars-Jones
- Produced by: Emma Norton; Lee Groombridge; Ed Guiney; Andrew Lowe
- Starring: Harry Melling; Alexander Skarsgård
- Cinematography: Nick Morris
- Edited by: Gareth C. Scales
- Music by: Oliver Coates
- Production companies: BBC Film; BFI; Element Pictures
- Distributed by: Warner Bros. Pictures; Picturehouse Entertainment
- Release dates: 18 May 2025 (Cannes); 28 November 2025 (United Kingdom)
- Running time: 107 minutes
- Countries: United Kingdom; Ireland
- Language: English
- Budget: £814,000 ($1 million)
- Box office: $6.6 million

Pillion is a 2025 gay romantic dramedy written and directed by Harry Lighton, based on the 2020 novel Box Hill by Adam Mars-Jones. The film stars Harry Melling as a timid gay man and Alexander Skarsgård as an enigmatic biker who start a BDSM relationship.

Pillion had its premiere in the Un Certain Regard section of the 78th Cannes Film Festival, where it won the section's Best Screenplay prize and the Palm Dog for Mutt Moment. It was released in cinemas in the United Kingdom on 28 November 2025 by Warner Bros. Pictures and Picturehouse Entertainment. It received critical acclaim, with particular praise for Lighton's writing and directing, as well as the performances of Melling and Skarsgård.

At the 28th British Independent Film Awards, the film earned ten nominations and won in four categories, including Best British Independent Film. It was nominated for Best Adapted Screenplay, Outstanding British Film, and Outstanding Debut by a British Writer, Director or Producer (for Lighton) at the 79th British Academy Film Awards. Lighton also won Best Adapted Screenplay at the 35th Gotham Independent Film Awards.

== Plot ==
Colin, a shy, introverted gay man, lives with his parents in Bromley, London, and works a menial job assigning parking tickets while pursuing his hobby of singing in a barbershop quartet. One evening at the pub, he is slipped a note by Ray, a handsome American member of a local biker club. The two meet on Christmas Day at a high street alleyway, where Ray wordlessly ushers Colin to perform oral sex on him. After the hookup, Colin suggests seeing Ray again, but Ray replies that he is not often around.

Colin texts Ray, but receives no response. While Colin is at work, he receives a phone call from Ray. Ray picks up Colin at his home on a motorbike, meeting Colin's parents for the first time. Ray brings Colin to his home, where Colin is initiated into a strict BDSM relationship: Colin cooks, cleans, and shops, sleeps on the floor at the foot of Ray's bed, and obeys Ray's every command. In return, Colin enjoys an intense but controlled sexual relationship with Ray, in which they never kiss. Acclimating to Ray's lifestyle, Colin shaves his head, begins to wear a chained padlock around his neck (with Ray wearing the key) (Note: A padlocked chain necklace/collar in a BDSM context usually indicates the sub, while a necklace with a padlock key indicates the dom in such a relationship.) and joins Ray's fetish biker community. Meanwhile, Colin's parents express their worries about how little Colin knows about Ray.

Though Ray does not celebrate Colin's birthday, the bikers throw a surprise party for him and they all go on a road trip. During this time, Colin witnesses different BDSM dynamics and sees a dominant and submissive kiss. Colin finds himself in a line-up of four men wearing chaps, leaning side-by-side over a picnic table, positioned to be penetrated by their doms. Ray has one of the other subs fellate him in front of Colin, much to Colin's chagrin. Ray then proceeds to have sex with Colin in the missionary position for the first time as a birthday gift, and Colin delights in the intimacy.

Given Colin's pleas and the fact Colin's mother is terminally ill, Ray finally relents in having dinner with Colin's parents at their home. Colin's parents fail to understand the couple's dynamic, resulting in an argument in which Colin's mother accuses Ray of mistreating and taking advantage of Colin and Ray accuses Colin's mother of a "backwards", "ignorant" worldview.

Some weeks later, Colin's mother dies. Following the funeral, Colin has a breakdown while cooking Ray's dinner, deliberately burning his hands. Ray helps Colin, orders them pizza and jokes around with Colin during dinner, and finally allows Colin to sleep in the bed with him for the first time, where Ray unknowingly cuddles Colin in his sleep. Colin confesses his love to Ray, but Ray replies that love is not the basis of their relationship. When Colin asks to be allowed to sleep in the bed again and to have a day off from his submissive role each week, Ray flatly refuses. The two fight, and Colin steals Ray's motorcycle and rides into the night.

The next morning, upon returning to Ray's house, Colin is shocked to find Ray has agreed they should enjoy a day off from their dominant and submissive dynamic. Colin is initially unsure what they should do as a "normal" couple. The two go to the cinema, where Ray touches Colin's thigh before giving him a handjob, and the two are chased out. After eating at a restaurant, they go to the park where they wrestle and share their first kiss. Colin is excited, but seems to read the sadness on Ray's face afterwards.

The next day, Ray disappears entirely, and Colin unsuccessfully attempts to locate him. Some time later, understanding and accepting that Ray has abandoned him, Colin makes an account on Grindr, seeking a new BDSM relationship, now with a better understanding of his limits and being more assertive about his demands. He meets up with a new dom, Darren, at a football pitch, and the two begin discussing the outlines of their dom-sub relationship.

== Cast ==
- Harry Melling as Colin
- Alexander Skarsgård as Ray
- Douglas Hodge as Pete, Colin's father
- Lesley Sharp as Peggy, Colin's mother
- Jake Shears as Kevin
- Mat Hill as Steve
- Nick Figgis as Don
- Zoe Engenrer as Don's wife
- Jake Sharp as Chigs
- Jacob Carter as Cousin Roy
- Cristina Carty as a colleague
- Zamir Mesiti as an usher
- Rosie Sheehy as Megan
- Miranda Bell as an elderly local
- Monica Purcell as the elder local friend
- Anthony Welsh as Darren
- Maggie as Rosie (uncredited), Ray's rottweiler

== Production ==
=== Development ===
On 8 May 2024, Variety reported that Harry Lighton would make his feature directorial debut with Pillion from a screenplay he wrote, based on the 2020 novel Box Hill by Adam Mars-Jones. The film is a co-production between the UK and Ireland. Element Pictures, BBC Film and the British Film Institute produced and financed the film, with Picturehouse Entertainment set to distribute in the United Kingdom. Emma Norton, Ed Guiney, Lee Groombridge, and Andrew Lowe produced the film. The score was composed by Oliver Coates. Nick Morris was the director of photography and Gareth C. Scales was the editor.

Lighton spent a weekend with the real-life members of the Gay Bikers Motorcycle Club (GBMCC) while researching for the film. They also served as advisors and appear in the film playing themselves as members of the gay biker gang.

Lighton met up with Paul Tallis, a London-based Welsh gay biker during his research. Lighton subsequently offered Tallis a part in the film as part of Ray's biker gang, incorporating Tallis's human pup persona to bring the film into the current era. Melling also spent a day riding as a pillion on Paul Tallis's motorbike, learning about the BDSM community, boot licking, and submissive behaviour.

=== Casting ===
In May 2024, Harry Melling and Alexander Skarsgård joined the cast of the film, with Skarsgård also serving as executive producer.

Scissor Sisters' lead vocalist Jake Shears made his screen acting debut in Pillion playing a gay biker, Kevin. Casting director Kahleen Crawford invited Shears for the film after she saw him in the musical Cabaret. Shears had been acquainted with Skarsgård through friends from years before and was excited to see him and work in the film. Shears—who was not familiar with the gay biker and BDSM world that is portrayed in the film—read The Leatherman's Handbook to prepare for his role.

=== Filming ===
Principal photography took place in London and South East England, starting on 29 July and wrapping in early September 2024. Shooting locations included Bromley in London, Lullingstone Castle and Sevenoaks in Kent. The locations were chosen due to the proximity to London for budgetary reasons, and one of the producers, Lee Groombridge, grew up in the area. Skarsgård wears a prosthetic penis with a Prince Albert piercing in the picnic fellatio scene.

=== Different cuts ===
Lighton said that several scenes from the film were cut from the version that was shown during its world premiere at the 2025 Cannes Film Festival, and that there could be some more cuts to ensure the film gets released in the United States. Skarsgård added: "There's definitely a raunchier version of this movie... what you've seen is the family friendly version... there's also the Alexander Skarsgård cut." Speaking to Variety following the film's premiere, Lighton explained:

It was purely because I didn't want to push the audience into feeling they were being deliberately shocked by an image. So for example, there was one close up of a dick, a hard dick... like down the barrel of the lens. And after watching the film on that 'fuck-off' screen I thought, yeah, cutting it was probably the right decision!

Lighton later revealed in a Reddit "ask me anything" on the film, that there is no director's cut of the film and Skarsgård was only joking.

== Release ==
In October 2024, A24 acquired US distribution rights to the film. It had its world premiere in the Un Certain Regard section of the Cannes Film Festival on 18 May 2025, where it earned a seven-minute standing ovation at the end of its screening.

Pillion had its British premiere on 18 October 2025 at the Southbank Centre as part of the BFI London Film Festival. The film was released in cinemas in the United Kingdom on 28 November 2025 by Picturehouse and Warner Bros. Pictures UK and in the United States on 6 February 2026 by A24. It was released on digital platforms in the UK on 12 January 2026.

During the various premieres, a number of gay leather clubs were invited to come to watch the film including SLM Stockholm and Leathermen of Ireland.

In cinemas in the United States, the film was released Not Rated despite the director wanting an NC-17 rating on the MPA scale. In its native UK and Ireland, it received an 18 certificate by both the BBFC and the IFCO due to sex and nudity.

== Reception ==
=== Critical response ===
On the review aggregator website Rotten Tomatoes, 99% of 201 critics' reviews are positive, with an average rating of 8.1/10. The website's consensus reads: "A remarkable directorial debut by Harry Lighton, Pillion is an unconventional romance that soars thanks to its nonjudgmental perspective and knockout performances." Metacritic, which uses a weighted average, assigned the film a score of 85 out of 100, based on 39 critics, indicating "universal acclaim".

Richard Lawson of Vanity Fair wrote: "Pillion gives little indication that Lighton is a first-time feature director. The film is confidently staged and handsomely styled, elegantly gliding through Colin and Ray's adventure (or misadventure) with a keen eye for detail and texture. The beauty of Pillion is that those of us watching on the sidelines are not voyeurs, but rather witnesses to something powerfully complex and human."

Peter Debruge of Variety called the film "a steamy art-house psychodrama that's fairly light on analysis but not at all shy about showing the germ of one man's titillating new turn-on", and "laced with a wry sense of humor, Pillion manages to be both understated and explicit in the way Lighton presents practically everything that happens in Colin and Ray's unconventional relationship."

Cédric Succivalli of the International Cinephile Society described Pillion as "an exceptional introduction to [Harry] Lighton as a filmmaker" and praised its blend of dark humour, psychological thriller elements, and strong performances. Pavel Snapkou of Showbiz by PS called Pillion "a delicate, emotionally intelligent study of identity, desire, and self-discovery" that balances shock value with psychological realism.

Dieter Osswald praised the lightheartedness of the debut on the leading German Arthaus portal Programmkino.de stating: "In contrast to the lackluster Hollywood fiasco Fifty Shades of Grey, this small indie production presents a relaxed and amusing look into the world of sadomasochism". Spectrum Culture praised Melling's performance, calling it one of the best of 2025: "...Skarsgard got the zippier lines, and rightfully so. That said, without Melling, there simply is no movie worth talking about."

In contrast, film review site LGBITION cautioned readers about the kinky relationship between Colin and Ray: "A functional D/s relationship is like any other relationship. It needs communication free of shame, with clear expression of desires, wants, and limits [...] In pillion [sic], none of that exists. Almost no communication, no negotiation, no consent, no limits, no safeword, no aftercare. Colin is dragged into a one‑sided, very toxic relationship. That’s what the movie is about."

=== Accolades ===
Award / Festival	Date of ceremony	Category	Recipient(s)	Result	Ref.
Cannes Film Festival	23 May 2025	Un Certain Regard Award	Harry Lighton	Nominated	
Cannes Film Festival	23 May 2025	Un Certain Regard – Best Screenplay	Harry Lighton	Won	
Cannes Film Festival	23 May 2025	Caméra d'Or	Harry Lighton	Nominated	
Cannes Film Festival	23 May 2025	Queer Palm	Harry Lighton	Nominated	
Cannes Film Festival	23 May 2025	Palm Dog – Mutt Moment	Hippo and Rosie	Won	
Valladolid International Film Festival	1 November 2025	Golden Spike	Pillion	Nominated	
Valladolid International Film Festival	1 November 2025	Best Actor	Harry Melling	Won	
Thessaloniki Film Festival	9 November 2025	Best Actor	Harry Melling	Won	
Stockholm International Film Festival	14 November 2025	Stockholm Achievement Award	Alexander Skarsgård	Won	
Stockholm International Film Festival	14 November 2025	Best Actor	Harry Melling	Won	
British Independent Film Awards	30 November 2025	Best British Independent Film	Harry Lighton, Lee Groombridge, Ed Guiney, Andrew Lowe, Emma Norton	Won	
British Independent Film Awards	30 November 2025	Best Director	Harry Lighton	Nominated	
British Independent Film Awards	30 November 2025	Best Lead Performance	Harry Melling	Nominated	
British Independent Film Awards	30 November 2025	Best Supporting Performance	Alexander Skarsgård	Nominated	
British Independent Film Awards	30 November 2025	Best Screenplay	Harry Lighton	Nominated	
British Independent Film Awards	30 November 2025	Douglas Hickox Award (Best Debut Director)	Harry Lighton	Nominated	
British Independent Film Awards	30 November 2025	Best Debut Screenwriter	Harry Lighton	Won	
British Independent Film Awards	20 November 2025	Best Costume Design	Grace Snell	Won	
British Independent Film Awards	20 November 2025	Best Make-Up & Hair Design	Diandra Ferreira	Won	
British Independent Film Awards	20 November 2025	Best Editing	Gareth C. Scales	Nominated	
Gotham Independent Film Awards	1 December 2025	Best Adapted Screenplay	Harry Lighton	Won	
Gotham Independent Film Awards	1 December 2025	Outstanding Supporting Performance	Alexander Skarsgård	Nominated	
New York Film Critics Online	15 December 2025	Best Supporting Actor	Alexander Skarsgård	Nominated	
New York Film Critics Online	15 December 2025	Best Debut Director	Harry Lighton	Nominated	
Rotten Tomatoes Awards	13 January 2026	Best Romance Movie	Pillion	Won	
London Film Critics' Circle	1 February 2026	Supporting Actor of the Year	Alexander Skarsgård	Nominated	
London Film Critics' Circle	1 February 2026	British/Irish Film of the Year	Pillion	Won	
London Film Critics' Circle	1 February 2026	Breakthrough British/Irish Filmmaker of the Year	Harry Lighton	Won	
Directors Guild of America Awards	7 February 2026	Michael Apted Award for Outstanding Directorial Achievement in First-Time Theatrical Feature Film	Harry Lighton	Nominated	
Casting Society's Artios Awards	26 February 2026	Feature: Studio or Independent: Drama	Kahleen Crawford	Nominated	
British Academy of Film Awards	22 February 2026	Outstanding British Film	Pillion	Nominated	
British Academy of Film Awards	22 February 2026	Outstanding British Debut	Pillion	Nominated	
British Academy of Film Awards	22 February 2026	Adapted Screenplay	Pillion	Nominated	
Fidos Award	2 March 2026	Rom Com Rover	Maggie	Won	
Dorian Awards	3 March 2026	LGBTQ Film of the Year	Pillion	Won	
Dorian Awards	3 March 2026	LGBTQ Screenplay of the Year	Harry Lighton	Nominated	
