= Lizard (film) =

- Poster
- Directed by: Akinola Davies
- Written by: Akinola Davies; Wale Davies
- Starring: Pamilerin Ayodeji; Osayi Uzamere; Charles Etubiebi
- Cinematography: Shabier Kirchner
- Edited by: Kit Jennings
- Production companies: Potboiler Productions; Fatherland Productions
- Release date: 7 October 2020
- Running time: 18 minutes
- Countries: United Kingdom; Nigeria
- Language: English

Lizard is a Nigerian short film co-written by Akinola Davies Jr. and Wale Davies and directed by Davies. It was the only Nigerian submission at the 2021 Sundance Film Festival and the first Nigerian production to win the Grand Jury Prize at the festival.

== Plot ==
Lizard tells the story of Juwon, an eight-year-old girl who gets kicked out of Sunday school for having the extraordinary ability to sense danger. She gets involved in criminal activities following this.

== Cast ==
- Pamilerin Ayodeji as Juwon
- Osayi Uzameren as robbery leader
- Charles Etubiebi as Adamu
- Rita Edward as Aunty Titi
- Nmasinachi Chikebulbe as Baby
- Morgan Samuel as robber
- Matthew Solomon as robber
- Fadeyi Ibrahim as robber
- Issah Ibrahim as robber
- Jamal Ibrahim as Mr. Peters
- Erezi Ebulu as woman in counting room
- Demi Olunbanwo as Pastor Emeka
- Gwen Jemila as attractive woman
- Patrick Diabuah as Pastor Tony
- Halimat Olanrewaju as Dele
- Ikponmwosa Gold as Monday
- Naomi Akalanze as Morayo
- Mosorire Oluwa as Lola
- Genoveva Umeh as Kafilat
- Lala Akindoju as Patience
- Ade Laoye as Yemi / Mummy

== Production ==
Lizard is set in 1990s Lagos and based on a real life event that happened to Akinola Davies but was infused with fantasy.

== Reception ==
Lizard won the Grand Jury Prize at the 2021 Sundance Film Festival. At the 74th British Academy Film Awards it was nominated for Best Short Film.

Accolades

Award	Year	Category	Result	Ref
Africa International Film Festival	2021	Best Short Film	Nominated	
British Academy Film Awards	2021	Best Short Film	Nominated	
London Critics Circle Film Awards	2020	British/Irish Short Film of the Year	Nominated	
Seattle International Film Festival	2020	Short Film Award – Narrative	Nominated	
Sundance Film Festival	2021	Short Film Grand Jury Prize	Won	
