= BAFTA Award for Outstanding Debut by a British Writer, Director or Producer =

British film industry award

- Awarded for: Excellence in the debut from a British writer, director or producer
- Location: London
- Country: United Kingdom
- Presented by: British Academy of Film and Television Arts
- First award: 1998
- Currently held by: Akinola Davies Jr. and Wale Davies for My Father's Shadow (2025)
- Website: http://www.bafta.org/

The BAFTA Award for Outstanding Debut by a British Writer, Director or Producer is a film award presented annually at the British Academy Film Awards in London. The British Academy of Film and Television Arts (BAFTA) is a British organisation that hosts annual awards shows for film, television, and video games (and formerly also for children's film and television). The Outstanding Debut award recognises the work of writers, directors and producers whose first films have been released in cinemas during the award's qualification window. It is presented in honour of screenwriter and producer Carl Foreman.

- From 1998 to 2000, this category was known as the Carl Foreman Award for Most Promising Newcomer in British Film (and was presented to a writer, director or producer).
- From 2001 to 2008, this category was known as the Carl Foreman Award for Special Achievement by a British Director, Writer or Producer in their first Feature Film.
- From 2009–present, this category has been known by its current name of Outstanding Debut by a British Writer, Director or Producer.

== Jury Process ==
Unlike many of the other BAFTA Awards, which are decided by a membership vote, the Outstanding Debut Award's nominees and winner are decided by a jury of industry experts who view and consider eligible films over the course of the year. The jury can choose to nominate any combination of debut writer, director or producer involved in a film.

The jury has been chaired by Prof. Anthony Mellows (1999–2009), Simon Relph (2009–2012), Stephen Woolley (2012–2016), Tanya Seghatchian (2017-2019), Briony Hanson (2020-2022), and Clare Stewart (2023 onwards).

Like the chairs, jurors normally take part for several years. Several previous winners have served as jurors including Asif Kapadia, Mark Jenkin, and Babak Anvari, as well as nominees including Joe Cornish, Dexter Fletcher, Nira Park, Alice Birch, Rose Glass, Elhum Shakerifar and Clio Barnard . Other notable jury members have included Naomi Ackie, David Arnold, Peter Bradshaw, Moira Buffini, Iain Canning, Justin Edgar, Jane Goldman, Elizabeth Karlsen, Ray Panthaki, Peter Straughan, Matthew Warchus, James Watkins, Ruth Wilson, and Penny Woolcock

== History ==
The first version of the award was established by the Foreman Williams Jones Foundation in 1991. Scholarships were awarded to promising British students to study filmmaking in the United States.

The present version of the award was initiated by the Foundation in 1997 and was conducted jointly by the Foundation and by BAFTA until 2009. It was established to encourage British filmmaking by recognising the most promising British newcomer in the selected disciplines of screenwriting, producing or directing (or in more than one of these disciplines). The first award of the present version was made in respect of 1998. In 2009, the name of the award was changed, and it is now solely administered by BAFTA. The award continues to be presented in honour of Carl Foreman.

== Winners and nominees ==
indicates the winner

=== 1990s ===
Year	Work	Recipient(s)
Carl Foreman Award for Most Promising Newcomer in British Film
1998 (52nd)	Love and Death on Long Island	Richard Kwietniowski
1998 (52nd)	The Governess	Sandra Goldbacher
1998 (52nd)	Lock, Stock and Two Smoking Barrels	Matthew Vaughn
1998 (52nd)	Twenty Four Seven	Shane Meadows
1999 (53rd)	Ratcatcher	Lynne Ramsay
1999 (53rd)	East is East	Ayub Khan-Din
1999 (53rd)	Human Traffic	Justin Kerrigan
1999 (53rd)	Waking Ned	Kirk Jones

=== 2000s ===
Year	Work	Recipient(s)
2000 (54th)	Last Resort	Paweł Pawlikowski
2000 (54th)	Billy Elliot	Stephen Daldry
2000 (54th)	Billy Elliot	Lee Hall
2000 (54th)	Saving Grace	Mark Crowdy
2000 (54th)	Some Voices	Simon Cellan Jones
Carl Foreman Award for Special Achievement by a British Director, Writer or Producer in their first Feature Film
2001 (55th)	Jump Tomorrow	Joel Hopkins, Nicola Usborne
2001 (55th)	Gosford Park	Julian Fellowes
2001 (55th)	Late Night Shopping	Jack Lothian
2001 (55th)	The Parole Officer	Steve Coogan, Henry Normal
2001 (55th)	South West 9	Richard Parry
2001 (55th)	Strictly Sinatra	Ruth Kenley-Letts
2002 (56th)	The Warrior	Asif Kapadia
2002 (56th)	AKA	Duncan Roy
2002 (56th)	Christie Malry's Own Double-Entry	Simon Bent
2002 (56th)	Lost in La Mancha	Lucy Darwin
2003 (57th)	Kiss of Life	Emily Young
2003 (57th)	American Cousins	Sergio Casci
2003 (57th)	Girl with a Pearl Earring	Peter Webber
2003 (57th)	To Kill a King	Jenny Mayhew
2004 (58th)	A Way of Life	Amma Asante
2004 (58th)	AfterLife	Andrea Gibb
2004 (58th)	Dear Frankie	Shona Auerbach
2004 (58th)	Layer Cake	Matthew Vaughn
2004 (58th)	Shaun of the Dead	Nira Park
2005 (59th)	Pride & Prejudice	Joe Wright
2005 (59th)	Everything	Richard Hawkins
2005 (59th)	Festival	Annie Griffin
2005 (59th)	Shooting Dogs	David Belton
2005 (59th)	Tsotsi	Peter Fudakowski
2006 (60th)	Red Road	Andrea Arnold
2006 (60th)	Black Sun	Gary Tarn
2006 (60th)	London to Brighton	Paul Andrew Williams
2006 (60th)	Pierrepoint	Christine Langan
2006 (60th)	Rollin' with the Nines	Julian Gilbey
2007 (61st)	Control	Matt Greenhalgh
2007 (61st)	Brick Lane	Sarah Gavron
2007 (61st)	The Killing of John Lennon	Andrew Piddington
2007 (61st)	Scott Walker: 30 Century Man	Mia Bays
2007 (61st)	Taking Liberties	Chris Atkins
2008 (62nd)	Hunger	Steve McQueen (writer/director)
2008 (62nd)	Mamma Mia!	Judy Craymer (producer)
2008 (62nd)	Man on Wire	Simon Chinn (producer)
2008 (62nd)	Of Time and the City	Roy Boulter; Sol Papadopoulos (producer)
2008 (62nd)	Son of Rambow	Garth Jennings (writer)
Outstanding Debut by a British Writer, Director or Producer
2009 (63rd)	Moon	Duncan Jones (writer/director)
2009 (63rd)	Exam	Stuart Hazeldine (writer/director/producer)
2009 (63rd)	Mugabe and the White African	Lucy Bailey (director); Andrew Thompson (director); Elizabeth Morgan Hemlock (producer); David Pearson (producer)
2009 (63rd)	Nowhere Boy	Sam Taylor-Wood (director)
2009 (63rd)	Shifty	Eran Creevy (writer/director)

=== 2010s ===
Year	Work	Recipient(s)
2010 (64th)	Four Lions	Chris Morris (writer/director)
2010 (64th)	The Arbor	Clio Barnard (director); Tracy O'Riordan (producer)
2010 (64th)	Exit Through the Gift Shop	Banksy (director); Jaimie D'Cruz (producer)
2010 (64th)	Monsters	Gareth Edwards (writer/director)
2010 (64th)	Skeletons	Nick Whitfield (writer/director)
2011 (65th)	Tyrannosaur	Paddy Considine (director); Diarmid Scrimshaw (producer)
2011 (65th)	Attack the Block	Joe Cornish (director)
2011 (65th)	Black Pond	Tom Kingsley (director); Will Sharpe (director); Sarah Brocklehurst (producer)
2011 (65th)	Coriolanus	Ralph Fiennes (director)
2011 (65th)	Submarine	Richard Ayoade (director)
2012 (66th)	The Imposter	Bart Layton (director); Dimitri Doganis (producer)
2012 (66th)	I Am Nasrine	Tina Gharavi (writer/director)
2012 (66th)	McCullin	David Morris (director); Jacqui Morris (director/producer)
2012 (66th)	The Muppets	James Bobin (director)
2012 (66th)	Wild Bill	Dexter Fletcher (writer/director); Danny King (writer)
2013 (67th)	Kelly + Victor	Kieran Evans (director/writer)
2013 (67th)	For Those in Peril	Paul Wright (director/writer); Polly Stokes (producer)
2013 (67th)	Good Vibrations	Colin Carberry (writer); Glenn Patterson (writer)
2013 (67th)	Saving Mr. Banks	Kelly Marcel (writer)
2013 (67th)	Shell	Scott Graham (director/writer)
2014 (68th)	Pride	Stephen Beresford (writer); David Livingstone (producer)
2014 (68th)	'71	Gregory Burke (writer); Yann Demange (director)
2014 (68th)	Kajaki	Paul Katis (director/producer); Andrew de Lotbiniere (producer)
2014 (68th)	Lilting	Hong Khaou (director/writer)
2014 (68th)	Northern Soul	Elaine Constantine (director/writer)
2015 (69th)	Theeb	Naji Abu Nowar (writer/director); Rupert Lloyd (producer)
2015 (69th)	Ex Machina	Alex Garland (director)
2015 (69th)	Second Coming	Debbie Tucker Green (writer/director)
2015 (69th)	The Survivalist	Stephen Fingleton (writer/director)
2015 (69th)	A Syrian Love Story	Sean McAllister (director/producer); Elhum Shakerifar (producer)
2016 (70th)	Under the Shadow	Babak Anvari (writer/director); Emily Leo (producer); Oliver Roskill (producer); Lucan Toh (producer)
2016 (70th)	The Girl with All the Gifts	Mike Carey (writer/director); Camille Gatin (producer)
2016 (70th)	The Hard Stop	George Amponsah (director); Dionne Walker (producer)
2016 (70th)	Notes on Blindness	Pete Middleton (director); James Spinney (director); Jo-Jo Ellison (producer)
2016 (70th)	The Pass	John Donnelly (writer); Ben A Williams (director)
2017 (71st)	I Am Not a Witch	Rungano Nyoni (writer/director); Emily Morgan (producer)
2017 (71st)	The Ghoul	Gareth Tunley (writer/director/producer); Jack Healy Guttman (producer); Tom Meeten (producer)
2017 (71st)	Jawbone	Johnny Harris (writer/producer); Thomas Napper (director)
2017 (71st)	Kingdom of Us	Lucy Cohen (director)
2017 (71st)	Lady Macbeth	Alice Birch (writer); William Oldroyd (director); Fodhla Cronin O'Reilly (producer)
2018 (72nd)	Beast	Michael Pearce (writer/director); Lauren Dark (producer)
2018 (72nd)	Apostasy	Daniel Kokotajilo (writer/director)
2018 (72nd)	A Cambodian Spring	Chris Kelly (writer/director/producer)
2018 (72nd)	Pili	Leanne Welham (writer/director); Sophie Harman (producer)
2018 (72nd)	Ray & Liz	Richard Billingham (writer/director); Jacqui Davies (producer)
2019 (73rd)	Bait	Mark Jenkin (writer/director); Kate Byers (producer); Lynn Waite (producer)
2019 (73rd)	For Sama	Waad Al-Khateab (director/producer); Edward Watts (director)
2019 (73rd)	Maiden	Alex Holmes (director)
2019 (73rd)	Only You	Harry Wootliff (writer/director)
2019 (73rd)	Retablo	Alvaro Delgado-Aparicio (writer/director)

=== 2020s ===
Year	Work	Recipient(s)
2020 (74th)	His House	Remi Weekes (writer/director)
2020 (74th)	Limbo	Ben Sharrock (writer/director); Irune Gurtubai (producer)
2020 (74th)	Moffie	Jack Sidney (writer/producer)
2020 (74th)	Rocks	Theresa Ikoko (writer); Claire Wilson (writer)
2020 (74th)	Saint Maud	Rose Glass (writer/director); Oliver Kassman (producer)
2021 (75th)	The Harder They Fall	Jeymes Samuel (writer/director) [also written by Boaz Yakin]
2021 (75th)	After Love	Aleem Khan (writer/director)
2021 (75th)	Boiling Point	James Cummings (writer); Hester Ruoff (producer) [also written by Philip Barantini and produced by Bart Ruspoli]
2021 (75th)	Keyboard Fantasies	Posy Dixon (writer/director); Liv Proctor (producer)
2021 (75th)	Passing	Rebecca Hall (writer/director)
2022 (76th)	Aftersun	Charlotte Wells (writer/director)
2022 (76th)	Blue Jean	Georgia Oakley (writer/director); Hélène Sifre (producer)
2022 (76th)	Electric Malady	Marie Lidén (director)
2022 (76th)	Good Luck to You, Leo Grande	Katy Brand (writer)
2022 (76th)	Rebellion	Elena Sánchez Bellot (director); Maia Kenworthy (director)
2023 (77th)	Earth Mama	Savanah Leaf (writer/director/producer); Shirley O'Connor (producer); Medb Riordan (producer)
2023 (77th)	Blue Bag Life	Lisa Selby (director); Rebecca Lloyd-Evans (director/producer); Alex Fry (producer)
2023 (77th)	Bobi Wine: The People's President	Christopher Sharp (director) [also directed Moses Bwayo]
2023 (77th)	How to Have Sex	Molly Manning Walker (writer/director)
2023 (77th)	Is There Anybody Out There?	Ella Glendining (director)
2024 (78th)	Kneecap	Rich Peppiatt (director/writer)
2024 (78th)	Hoard	Luna Carmoon (writer/director)
2024 (78th)	Monkey Man	Dev Patel (director)
2024 (78th)	Santosh	Sandhya Suri (writer/director), James Bowsher (producer), and Balthazar De Ganay (producer) [also produced by Alan Mcalex and Mike Goodridge]
2024 (78th)	Sister Midnight	Karan Kandhari (writer/director)
2025 (79th)	My Father's Shadow	Akinola Davies Jr. (writer/director) and Wale Davies (writer)
2025 (79th)	The Ceremony	Jack King (writer/director) Hollie Bryan (producer) and Lucy Meer (producer)
2025 (79th)	Pillion	Harry Lighton (writer/director)
2025 (79th)	A Want in Her	Myrid Carten (writer/director)
2025 (79th)	Wasteman	Cal McMau (director), Hunter Andrews (writer), and Eoin Doran (writer)

== See also ==
From 1952–1984, a separate Newcomer Award for performers was presented. For a full list of winners and nominees in this category, see BAFTA Award for Most Promising Newcomer to Leading Film Roles.

Since 2006, a separate Newcomer Award for performers presented annually as Rising Star Award. For a full list of winners and nominees in this category, see BAFTA Rising Star Award.
