= Pilcrow (novel) =

2008 novel by Adam Mars-Jones

- First edition
- Author: Adam Mars-Jones
- Cover artist: Sculpture by Alan Ballantyne for Penkridge Ceramics photographed by Johnny Ring
- Language: English
- Publisher: Faber & Faber
- Publication date: 2008
- Publication place: United Kingdom
- Media type: Print
- Pages: 544
- ISBN: 0-571-21703-6

Pilcrow is a novel by Adam Mars-Jones first published in 2008 by Faber.

== Plot ==
The book is in the form of a memoir by an adult John Cromer telling the story of his childhood and adolescence in the 1950s and early 1960s. He develops Still's disease at an early age and is confined to bed under a misdiagnosis of rheumatic fever. When the nature of his disease is finally realised he is transferred to the Canadian Red Cross Memorial Hospital in Taplow, Berkshire under the care of Dr Barbara Ansell, but by then he has very little movement left in his joints. Later he moves to a special school in Farley Castle where he is reliant on the "able-bodied" to help him move around and realises that he is homosexual.

== Reception ==
It has received mixed reviews. James Wood comments in the London Review of Books, "Pilcrow is a peculiar, original, utterly idiosyncratic book. It is admirably courageous, both in what it heaps on us, and in what it holds back. While it drops us deep into the every day, it boldly refuses the every day consolations of plot and dramatic structure."

== Continuation ==
The book finishes with John Cromer at the age of sixteen. The next instalment of his life, titled Cedilla, was published in 2011. The third, Caret, was published in 2023.
