= Stuffed (film) =

Romantic musical horror film

- Directed by: Theo Rhys
- Screenplay by: Theo Rhys; Joss Holden-Rea
- Based on: Stuffed by Theo Rhys
- Produced by: Sam Ritzenberg; Dimitra Tsingou; Myles Payne; Hayley Williams; Danny Roberts; H.S. Naji; Jackie Langelier
- Starring: Jodie Comer; Harry Melling
- Cinematography: Wyatt Garfield
- Edited by: Chris Dickens; Gareth C. Scales
- Music by: Joss Holden-Rea
- Production companies: Agile Films; Fresh Fish Films; BFI; Ffilm Cymru Wales
- Distributed by: Curzon
- Release date: September 10, 2026 (TIFF)
- Country: United Kingdom
- Language: English

Stuffed is an upcoming British musical body horror romance film. It is the feature length debut of writer-director Theo Rhys, and is starring Jodie Comer and Harry Melling.

== Premise ==
A man afraid of being forgotten volunteers his body to a taxidermist in the event of his death and they fall in love.

== Cast ==
- Jodie Comer as Araminta
- Harry Melling as Bernie

== Production ==
The film is the feature length debut of writer-director Theo Rhys, and is co-written with writer-composer Joss Holden-Rea who provides original music and lyrics. It is an expansion on Rhys' short film of the same name, which won the Midnight Jury and Audience Awards at SXSW Festival in 2021 and was nominated for BAFTA Award for Best Short Film at the 75th British Academy Film Awards the following year. It was produced by Sam Ritzenberg and Dimitra Tsingou, alongside Myles Payne and Hayley Williams of Agile Films, with Danny Roberts, Jackie Langelier and H.S. Naji of Fresh Fish Films. It was edited by Chris Dickens with Wyatt Garfield as cinematographer.

The cast is led by Jodie Comer and Harry Melling. Principal photography took place in Wales in September 2025.

== Release ==
The film will premiere in September 2026 as the opening film of the Discovery program at the 2026 Toronto International Film Festival. In November 2026, Curzon acquired distribution rights to the film in the United Kingdom and Ireland.
