= Adam Mars-Jones =

British novelist and literary critic (born 1954)

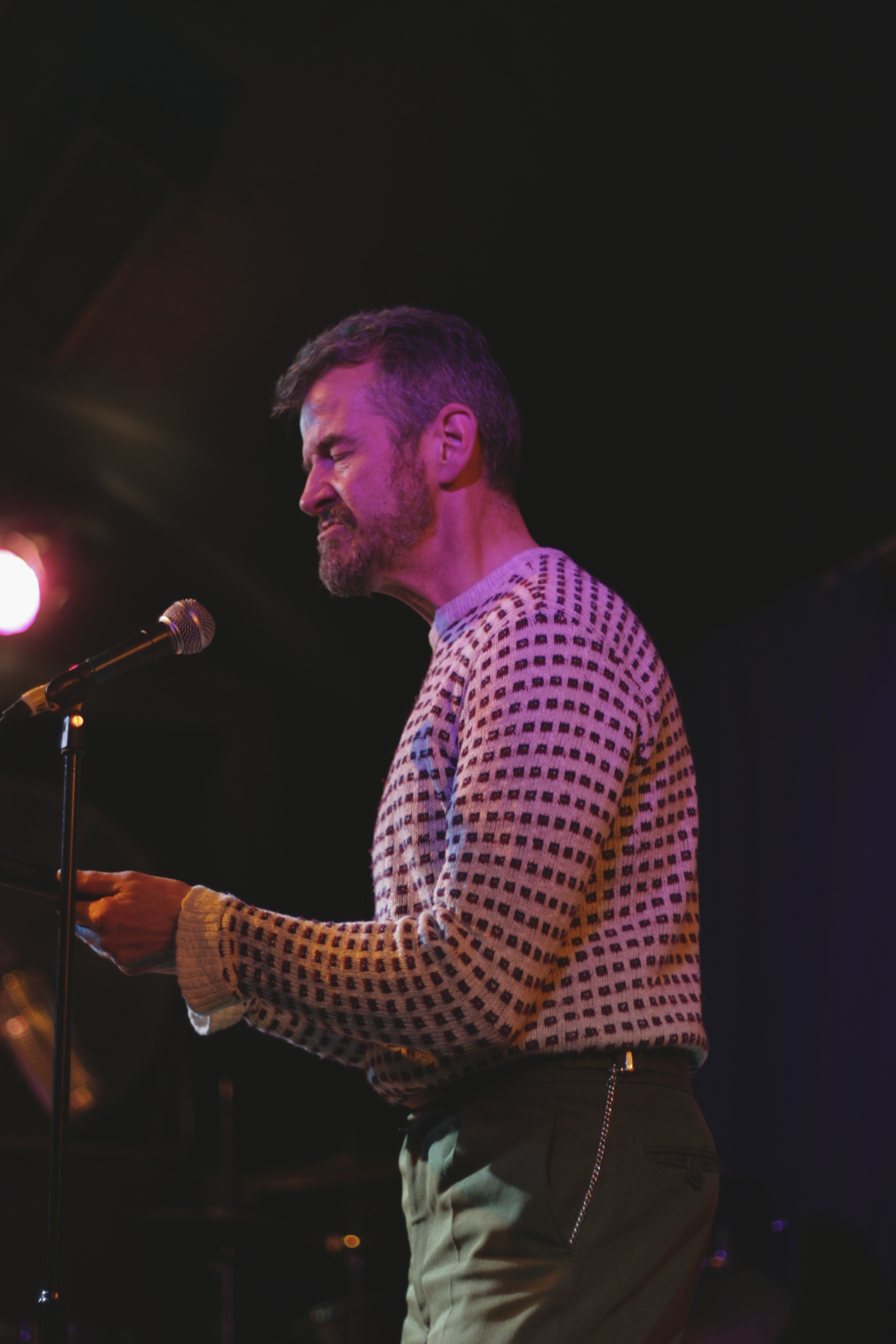
- Mars-Jones in 2012
- Born: 26 October 1954 (age 71); London, UK
- Occupations: Novelist and literary critic
- Notable work: Lantern Lecture (1981)
- Awards: Somerset Maugham Award

Adam Mars-Jones (born 26 October 1954) is a British novelist and literary and film critic.

== Early life and education ==
Mars-Jones was born in London, to Sir William Mars-Jones (1915–1999), a Welsh High Court judge, and Sheila Cobon (1923–1998), an attorney, daughter of Charles Cobon, a marine engineer. Mars-Jones attended Westminster School, and studied English at Trinity Hall, Cambridge.

== Career ==
Mars-Jones is a regular contributor to The Guardian, The Observer, The Times Literary Supplement, and the London Review of Books. He also participated in BBC Television's Newsnight Review.

His first collection of stories, Lantern Lecture (1981), won a Somerset Maugham Award. In 1983, he edited the collection Mae West Is Dead: Recent Lesbian and Gay Fiction. His own short fiction was collected in The Darker Proof: Stories from a Crisis (1987), co-written with Edmund White, and in Monopolies of Loss (1992); both works address the AIDS crisis. His essay "Venus Envy", a polemic against Martin Amis, was originally published in the CounterBlasts series in 1990.

Mars-Jones' first novel, The Waters of Thirst, was published in 1993. His second novel, Pilcrow (2008), was followed by two sequels, Cedilla (2011) and Caret (2023), which together form the first three volumes of a projected series.

He was elected a Fellow of the Royal Society of Literature in 2007.

Noriko Smiling, a book concerning the Yasujirō Ozu-directed film Late Spring, was published in 2011.

In 2012, he was awarded the inaugural Hatchet Job of the Year Award for his review of Michael Cunningham's By Nightfall.

On 2 January 2015, Mars-Jones was captain of the winning team on the television quiz show Christmas University Challenge, representing Trinity Hall, Cambridge, who defeated Balliol College, Oxford, the University of Edinburgh and the University of Hull. His teammates were international rower Tom James, world champion cyclist Emma Pooley and actor Dan Starkey.

His 2020 novel Box Hill was adapted into the 2025 film Pillion, starring Harry Melling and Alexander Skarsgaard.

== Personal life ==
Mars-Jones' 1997 "Blind Bitter Happiness" re-tells the difficult life of his mother and his relationship to her. His memoir Kid Gloves: A Voyage Round My Father (2015) deals with his father's struggle to come to terms with his son's homosexuality and his father's later slide into dementia in old age.

== Bibliography ==
Date	Title
1981	Lantern Lecture
1987	The Darker Proof: Stories from a Crisis (with Edmund White)
1990	"Venus Envy"
1992	The Monopolies of Loss
1994	The Waters of Thirst
1997	"Blind Bitter Happiness"
2008	Pilcrow
2011	Cedilla
2011	Noriko Smiling
2015	Kid Gloves: A Voyage Round My Father
2020	Box Hill
2021	Batlava Lake
2023	Caret
