= My Father's Shadow =

Nigerian/British drama film

- Nigerian theatrical release poster
- Directed by: Akinola Davies Jr.
- Written by: Wale Davies; Akinola Davies Jr.
- Produced by: Rachel Dargavel; Funmbi Ogunbanwo
- Starring: Sope Dirisu; Godwin Chiemerie Egbo; Chibuike Marvellous Egbo
- Cinematography: Jermaine Edwards
- Edited by: Omar Guzmán Castro
- Music by: Duval Timothy; CJ Mirra
- Production companies: Element Pictures; Fatherland Productions; BBC Film; BFI; Crybaby
- Distributed by: FilmOne Entertainment (Nigeria); Mubi (United Kingdom)
- Release dates: 18 May 2025 (Cannes); 19 September 2025 (Nigeria); 6 February 2026 (United Kingdom)
- Running time: 93 minutes
- Countries: United Kingdom; Nigeria
- Languages: English; Pidgin English; Yoruba
- Budget: $3.4 million
- Box office: $1 million

My Father's Shadow is a 2025 drama film directed by Akinola Davies Jr., in his feature length film debut, from a screenplay he co-wrote with his brother Wale Davies. Starring Sope Dirisu, it follows a family reunion during the 1993 Nigerian election. It was theatrically released in Nigeria on 19 September 2025 by FilmOne Entertainment.

A UK-Nigeria co-production, the film had its world premiere at the Un Certain Regard section of the 2025 Cannes Film Festival on 18 May, becoming the first Nigerian film to be selected for the festival's Official Selection. It won the Special Mention for the Caméra d'Or.

My Father's Shadow was critically acclaimed, receiving numerous awards and nominations, including a BAFTA Award for Outstanding Debut, a British Independent Film Award and two Gotham Independent Film Award. It was also selected as the UK's entry for Best International Feature Film at the 98th Academy Awards, but it was not nominated.

== Plot ==
Two young brothers are playing in a house on the Nigerian countryside when they unexpectedly run into their father, Folarin. After the youngest son, Akin, begs for Folarin to spend more time with him, he agrees to bring them along to his work in Lagos. The family board a minibus, but it soon runs out of fuel and they are forced to hitchhike the rest of the way to Lagos. Once there, Folarin introduces his sons to his workplace, where it is revealed he has not been paid for six months. After a colleague tells Folarin that their manager should be back by nightfall, Folarin resolves to stick around Lagos with his children until then.

Walking the city streets, Folarin and the children notice the persistent presence of the military. They do various activities together, visiting an amusement park, enjoying street food and swimming at the beach. Throughout the day, Folarin suffers from unexplained nosebleeds. He bonds with his children, teaching them the value of fraternal love and explaining that in his childhood, his own brother died from drowning. Following his brother's death, Folarin kept seeing visions of his brother's restless spirit, which eventually subside when Folarin names his son Remi after his brother.

As evening falls, the family returns to Folarin's workplace, where the manager has still not shown up. Folarin's colleague invites the family to go to a café with him, where they drink palm wine and watch a televised announcement about the 1993 Nigerian presidential election. Folarin leaves his children to talk to a young woman working at the café called Abike, but is followed by his son Remi who learns that his father is having an affair with her. When the Nigerian military announces that they have annulled the election, the café devolves into chaos as people angrily take to the streets. Folarin quickly flees the scene with his sons and tries to bring them home, but they are stopped at a military checkpoint by an aggressive soldier who claims to recognize Folarin from a violent incident from the previous week. Folarin's nose bleeds heavily and they are eventually allowed to pass.

Some time later, Folarin has died and Akin, Remi and their mother attend his funeral.

== Cast ==
- Sope Dirisu as Folarin
- Godwin Chiemerie Egbo as Akinola (Akin)
- Chibuike Marvellous Egbo as Olaremi (Remi)
- Uzoamaka Power as Abike

== Production ==
=== Development ===
The Davies brothers developed the idea for the film over more than a decade, drawing inspiration from the loss of their father when they were both very young. In 2012, Wale wrote the first draft of the script, which centers on two brothers spending a day in Lagos with their father on the day of Nigeria's historic 1993 presidential election, widely regarded as a turning point in the nation’s contemporary history.

The film was directed by Akinola Davies Jr. from a script he co-wrote with Wale Davies. BBC Film and the British Film Institute (BFI) co-financed the production of the film. Producing partners included Crybaby Films, Element Pictures (Rachel Dargaveland) and Fatherland Productions (Funmbi Ogunbanwo). The budget was around £2.5million ($3.4 million).

=== Filming ===
Principal photography took place on location in Lagos, Nigeria. Cinematographer Jermaine Edwards shot the film in 16 mm film.

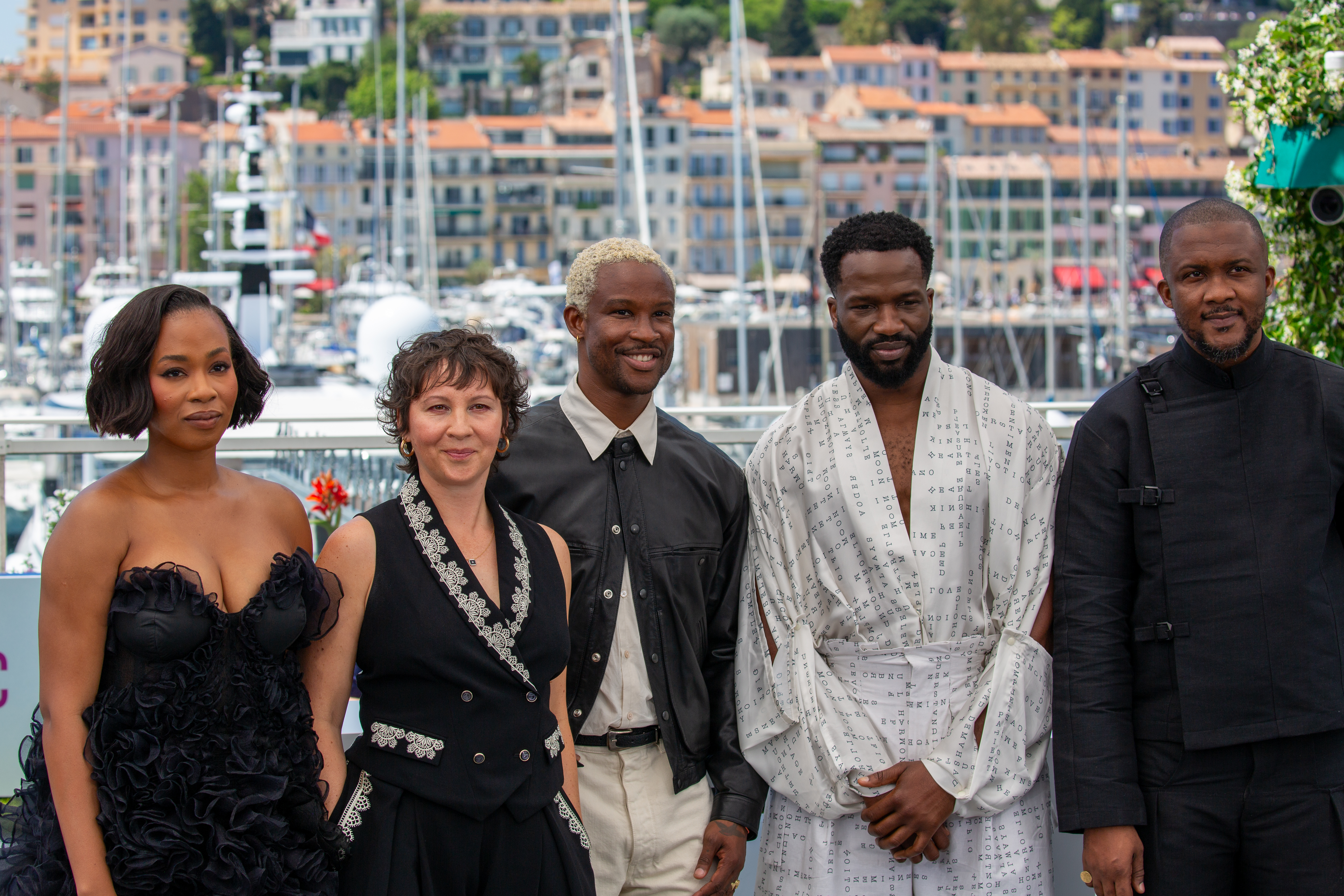
Cast and crew at the 2025 Cannes Film Festival

== Release ==
The film had its world premiere at the Un Certain Regard section of the 2025 Cannes Film Festival on 18 May 2025 and North American Premiere in the Centrepiece section on September 8 at the Toronto International Film Festival. Its wide release in Nigerian cinemas followed on September 19.

It also screened in the International competition section of the 56th International Film Festival of India in November 2025 where it won the Silver Peacock Special Jury Award.

The streaming service Mubi acquired distribution rights for North America, the U.K., Ireland, and Turkey in February 2025. The film was released in the United Kingdom and Ireland on 6 February 2026.

== Reception ==
On the review aggregator website Rotten Tomatoes, 98% of 82 critics' reviews are positive, with an average rating of 8.1/10. The website's consensus reads: "Weaving high-stakes political commentary with rich personal dynamics that are bolstered by Sope Dirisu's commanding performance, My Father's Shadow casts a highly promising light on feature-debut director Akinola Davies' future." On Metacritic, the film has a weighted average score of 85 out of 100 based on 17 critics, which the site labels as "universal acclaim".

Early reviews following the film's premiere at Cannes from media such as Variety, Deadline Hollywood, The Guardian, IndieWire, and Screen Daily were widely favorable. David Friend of The Canadian Press said the film "evokes the gentle touch of Barry Jenkins’ 'Moonlight.'"

Caryn James and Nicholas Barber of BBC named it one of the best films of 2026.

=== Accolades ===
The film received 12 nominations for the British Independent Film Awards 2025, including best British independent film and director.

Award / Festival	Date of ceremony	Category	Recipient(s)	Result	Ref.
Cannes Film Festival	24 May 2025	Un Certain Regard	Akinola Davies Jr.	Nominated	
Cannes Film Festival	24 May 2025	Caméra d'Or – Special Mention	Akinola Davies Jr.	Won	
BFI London Film Festival	19 October 2025	Sutherland Award	My Father's Shadow	Nominated	
Chicago International Film Festival	24 October 2025	Gold Hugo	My Father's Shadow	Nominated	
Chicago International Film Festival	24 October 2025	Special Mention	My Father's Shadow	Won	
Seville European Film Festival	15 November 2025	Rampa Award	My Father's Shadow	Won	
International Film Festival of India	28 November 2025	Special Jury Award	Akinola Davies Jr.	Won	
British Independent Film Awards	30 November 2025	Best British Independent Film	Akinola Davies Jr., Wale Davies, Rachel Dargavel, Funmbi Ogunbanwo	Nominated	
British Independent Film Awards	30 November 2025	Best Director	Akinola Davies Jr.	Won	
British Independent Film Awards	30 November 2025	Douglas Hickox Award (Best Debut Director)	Akinola Davies Jr.	Nominated	
British Independent Film Awards	30 November 2025	Best Screenplay	Wale Davies	Nominated	
British Independent Film Awards	30 November 2025	Best Debut Screenwriter	Wale Davies	Nominated	
British Independent Film Awards	30 November 2025	Best Cinematography	Jermaine Edwards	Nominated	
British Independent Film Awards	30 November 2025	Best Costume Design	PC Williams	Nominated	
British Independent Film Awards	30 November 2025	Best Editing	Omar Guzman Castro	Nominated	
British Independent Film Awards	30 November 2025	Best Make-Up & Hair Design	Kehinde Are, Feyzo Oyebisi	Nominated	
British Independent Film Awards	30 November 2025	Best Original Music	CJ Mirra, Duval Timothy	Nominated	
British Independent Film Awards	30 November 2025	Best Production Design	Jennifer Anti, Pablo Anti	Nominated	
British Independent Film Awards	30 November 2025	Best Sound	CJ Mirra, James Ridgway, Joe Jackson, Adele Fletcher, Pius Fatoke	Nominated	
Gotham Independent Film Awards	1 December 2025	Breakthrough Director	Akinola Davies Jr.	Won	
Gotham Independent Film Awards	1 December 2025	Outstanding Lead Performance	Ṣọpẹ́ Dìrísù	Won	
British Academy Film Awards	22 February 2026	Outstanding Debut by a British Writer, Director or Producer	Akinola Davies Jr.	Won	
Africa Magic Viewers' Choice Awards	9 May 2026	Best Overall Movie	Funmbi Ogunbanwo and Rachel Dargavel	Won	
Africa Magic Viewers' Choice Awards	9 May 2026	Best Director	Akinola Davies Jr.	Won	
Africa Magic Viewers' Choice Awards	9 May 2026	Best Sound Design	Pius Fatoke, CJ Mirra	Won	
Africa Magic Viewers' Choice Awards	9 May 2026	Best Cinematography	Jermaine Edwards	Nominated	
Africa Magic Viewers' Choice Awards	9 May 2026	Best Editing	Omar Guzman Castro	Nominated	
Africa Magic Viewers' Choice Awards	9 May 2026	Best Score/Music	Duval Timothy, CJ Mirra	Won	
Africa Magic Viewers' Choice Awards	9 May 2026	Best Writing (Movie)	Wale Davies	Won	
National Film Awards UK	1 July 2026	Best Feature Film	My Father's Shadow	Nominated	
National Film Awards UK	1 July 2026	Best Director	Akinola Davies Jr.	Nominated	
National Film Awards UK	1 July 2026	Best Streaming Platform	Mubi	Nominated	
National Film Awards UK	1 July 2026	Best Independent Film	My Father's Shadow	Nominated	
National Film Awards UK	1 July 2026	Best Newcomer	Godwin Egbo & Chibuike Marvellous Egbo	Nominated	
National Film Awards UK	1 July 2026	Best International Film	My Father's Shadow	Nominated	

== See also ==
- List of submissions to the 98th Academy Awards for Best International Feature Film
- List of British submissions for the Academy Award for Best International Feature Film
