= Harry Lighton =

British film director and screenwriter

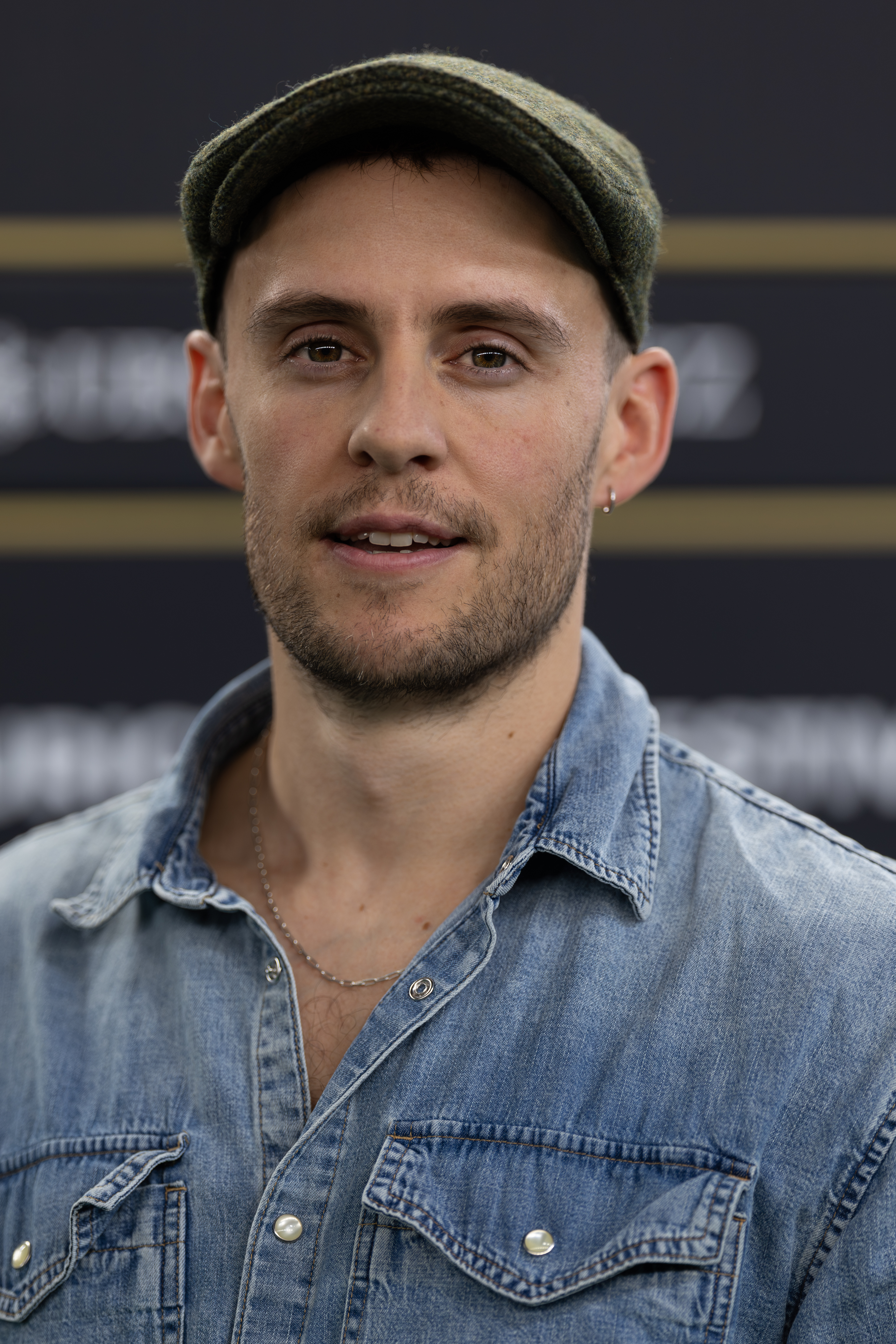
- Lighton in 2025
- Born: 20 October 1992 (age 33); Portsmouth, Hampshire, England, UK
- Education: University of Oxford
- Occupations: Film director; screenwriter
- Years active: 2016–present

Harry Lighton (born 20 October 1992) is a British filmmaker. His feature directorial debut, Pillion, premiered at the 2025 Cannes Film Festival and won two British Independent Film Awards and a Gotham Independent Film Awards.

== Early life and education ==
Lighton was born in Portsmouth, Hampshire, England, UK, on 20 October 1992. He is the son of Sir Thomas Hamilton Lighton of the Lighton baronetcy. Lighton has a twin brother.

He was educated at Eton College, representing the school in the ISFA Cup Final in 2011.

Lighton has an English literature degree from the University of Oxford.

== Career ==
Lighton began making short films whilst studying English literature at the University of Oxford. His most noted short film, Wren Boys (2017), received a British Academy Film Award nomination for Best Short Film at the 71st British Academy Film Awards, and a British Independent Film Award nomination for Best British Short Film at the British Independent Film Awards 2017.

His feature film debut, Pillion, premiered in the Un Certain Regard section at the 2025 Cannes Film Festival, where it won the award for Best Screenplay. The film was also screened at the 2025 BFI London Film Festival.

"50 Shades of BDSM, Wallace & Gromit" was how The Guardian headlined its review of the film. The director commented in an interview with the German site "queer.de": "I’m thrilled—that’s the most beautiful comparison anyone has ever made. I grew up with Wallace & Gromit, and part of our humor in Pillion is definitely inspired by it. So, for me, that comparison feels very spot on".

== Personal life ==
Lighton describes his sexual orientation as gay. He lives in London.

== Filmography ==
| Year | Title | Notes |
|---|---|---|
| 2016 | Knitlab: XY | Short film |
| 2016 | Sunday Morning Coming Down | Short film |
| 2017 | Look at Me | Short film |
| 2017 | Wren Boys | Short film |
| 2018 | Leash | Short film |
| 2019 | Pompeii | Short film |
| 2025 | Pillion | Feature film |

== Awards and nominations ==
| Award / Festival | Date of ceremony | Category | Work | Result | Ref. |
|---|---|---|---|---|---|
| BFI London Film Festival | 15 October 2017 | Best Short Film | Wren Boys | Nominated | |
| UK Film Festival | 26 November 2017 | Best British Short Film | Wren Boys | Won | |
| British Independent Film Awards | 10 December 2017 | Best British Short Film | Wren Boys | Nominated | |
| Flickerfest International Short Film Festival | 21 January 2018 | Best International Short Film | Wren Boys | Nominated | |
| Sundance Film Festival | 27 January 2018 | Short Film Grand Jury Prize | Wren Boys | Nominated | |
| British Academy Film Awards | 18 February 2018 | Best Short Film | Wren Boys | Nominated | |
| Hong Kong International Film Festival | 5 April 2018 | Golden Firebird Award | Wren Boys | Nominated | |
| ÉCU European Independent Film Festival | 6 May 2018 | Best European Independent Dramatic Short | Wren Boys | Won | |
| Provincetown International Film Festival | 17 June 2018 | Best Narrative Short | Wren Boys | Won | |
| Fire!! Gay and Lesbian International Film Show | 17 June 2018 | Best Short | Wren Boys | Won | |
| Galway Film Fleadh | 15 July 2018 | Tiernan McBride Award for Best Fiction Short | Wren Boys | Won | |
| Show Me Shorts | 7 October 2018 | Best International Film | Wren Boys | Won | |
| Cannes Film Festival | 23 May 2025 | Un Certain Regard Award | Pillion | Nominated | |
| Cannes Film Festival | 23 May 2025 | Un Certain Regard – Best Screenplay | Pillion | Won | |
| Cannes Film Festival | 23 May 2025 | Caméra d'Or | Pillion | Nominated | |
| Cannes Film Festival | 23 May 2025 | Queer Palm | Pillion | Nominated | |
| British Independent Film Awards | 30 November 2025 | Best British Independent Film | Pillion | Won | |
| British Independent Film Awards | 30 November 2025 | Best Director | Pillion | Nominated | |
| British Independent Film Awards | 30 November 2025 | Best Screenplay | Pillion | Nominated | |
| British Independent Film Awards | 30 November 2025 | Douglas Hickox Award for Best Debut Director | Pillion | Nominated | |
| British Independent Film Awards | 30 November 2025 | Best Debut Screenwriter | Pillion | Won | |
| Gotham Independent Film Awards | 1 December 2025 | Best Adapted Screenplay | Pillion | Won | |
| Palm Springs International Film Festival | 12 January 2026 | Variety's 10 Directors to Watch | Pillion | Won | |
| London Film Critics Circle Awards | 1 February 2026 | Philip French Award for Breakthrough British/Irish Filmmaker of the Year | Pillion | Won | |
| London Film Critics Circle Awards | 1 February 2026 | Attenborough Award for British/Irish Film of the Year | Pillion | Won | |
| Directors Guild of America Awards | 7 February 2026 | Michael Apted Award for Outstanding Directorial Feature Debut | Pillion | Nominated | |
| British Academy of Film Awards | 27 February 2026 | Outstanding British Film | Pillion | Nominated | |
| British Academy of Film Awards | 27 February 2026 | Outstanding British Debut | Pillion | Nominated | |
| British Academy of Film Awards | 27 February 2026 | Adapted Screenplay | Pillion | Nominated | |
| Dorian Awards | 3 March 2026 | LGBTQ Film of the Year | Pillion | Won | |
| Dorian Awards | 3 March 2026 | LGBTQ Screenplay of the Year | Pillion | Nominated | |

== See also ==
- List of British film directors
