= A Want in Her =

- Directed by: Myrid Carten
- Written by: Myrid Carten
- Produced by: Roisín Geraghty; Kat Mansoor; Tadhg O'Sullivan; Eline van Wees
- Cinematography: Myrid Carten; Sean Mullan; Donna Wade
- Edited by: Karen Harley
- Music by: Clarice Jensen
- Production companies: Inland Films; Snowstorm Productions; Basalt Film
- Distributed by: Breakout; Sentioar
- Release dates: 15 November 2024 (International Documentary Film Festival Amsterdam); 10 October 2025 (Ireland)
- Running time: 81 minutes
- Countries: Ireland; United Kingdom; Netherlands
- Languages: English; Irish

A Want in Her is a 2024 documentary film directed, written, starring, and cinematographed by Myrid Carten, in her feature directorial debut. In 2026, the film was nominated for the BAFTA Award for Outstanding Debut by a British Writer, Director or Producer. The film had its world premiere at the International Documentary Film Festival Amsterdam on 15 November 2024.

== Themes ==
An Irish-British-Dutch co-production, the documentary follows Myrid Carten and her mother, Nuala, who goes missing somewhere in Ireland. Her search takes her into a feuding family, a contested house, and a history that threatens to take everyone down, including herself. It explores themes of intergenerational trauma, dysfunctional family relationships, and the need for individuation from family members struggling with addiction and mental illness.

Carten has said that she was inspired by John McGahern’s memoir for its keen portrait of family life in rural Ireland. The film's soundtrack is also inspired from Irish bands like Lankum.

== Production ==
=== Filming ===
The film offers an interwoven, synchronous view of Myrid Carten's childhood, teenage, and adult years, featuring archival footage from Carten's childhood in a Donegal Gaeltacht as well as news footage of her mother's youth from Nuala's days as a social worker. Newer footage for the film was shot from 2018 through the COVID pandemic, and is largely on 16mm.

=== Editing ===
By the end of 2020, Carten produced a 60-minute cut for the film. After getting Karen Harley, a Brazilian editor, on board, she worked on the remainder till early 2024.

== Release ==
A Want in Her had its world premiere at the International Documentary Film Festival Amsterdam on 15 November 2024. On 29 November 2024, Syndicado acquired the worldwide sales to the film. The film was released in Ireland on 10 October 2025, and was showcased at the Irish Film Institute.

The film had its United States premiere at the Museum of the Moving Image as part of the "First Look 2025" festival. In London, the film was screened at the Institute of Contemporary Arts (ICA) and the Kiln Theatre, the latter of which featured a director Q&A, The film was also screened with Q&A at Sheffield Doc Fest in Jun 2025, and at the True/False Film Festival on 28 February 2025.
