= Wasteman =

2025 British film by Cal McMau

- Theatrical release poster
- Directed by: Cal McMau
- Screenplay by: Hunter Andrews; Eoin Doran
- Produced by: Sophia Gibber; Myles Payne; Philip Barantini; Samantha Beddoe
- Starring: David Jonsson; Tom Blyth
- Cinematography: Lorenzo Levrini
- Edited by: James A. Demetriou
- Music by: Forest Swords
- Production company: Agile Films
- Distributed by: Lionsgate
- Release dates: 6 September 2025 (TIFF); 20 February 2026 (United Kingdom)
- Running time: 90 minutes
- Country: United Kingdom
- Language: English
- Box office: $1 million

Wasteman is a 2025 British prison film directed by Cal McMau from a screenplay by Hunter Andrews and Eoin Doran. The film stars David Jonsson and Tom Blyth.

Wasteman premiered at the 2025 Toronto International Film Festival on 6 September 2025, and was released in the United Kingdom by Lionsgate on 20 February 2026.

== Plot ==
Taylor, a prison cook who has been incarcerated for 13 years, is informed he is eligible for early release on the basis he maintains good behaviour. Taylor regularly does haircuts for fellow prisoners Gaz and Paul, from whom he buys drugs to fuel his addiction. He manages to make contact with his now 14-year-old, estranged son Adam.

While struggling to fill out the form for his release, Taylor is assigned a new cellmate, Dee, who starts selling drugs not long after his arrival, taking business away from Gaz and Paul. Taylor and Dee start to form a friendship, with Taylor opening up about how he accidentally killed a teenager by selling him drugs to provide for Adam, which landed him in prison with a manslaughter charge. Dee lets Taylor use his phone to contact Adam, also sending Adam a pair of expensive trainers via his friend on the outside as a present from Taylor. Frustrated with how Dee has taken away their control over the prison's drug trade, Gaz and Paul violently attack and beat him unconscious while Taylor stands back helpless. Afterwards, the pair force Taylor to punch Dee, filming it to share around the prison. Dee is taken to the hospital to recover.

Upon Dee’s return, he attacks Taylor for not backing him up. Taylor is forced to become a mule for Dee, collecting drug drops from the courtyard. While running a drop over to Dee, Taylor is stopped by Gaz and his associates. Their attempts to get Taylor to give them the drugs are stopped when Dee attacks them all, inciting a riot among the prisoners. Tensions further escalate when Gaz and Paul post a video inciting other prisoners to kill Dee in exchange for money. At the same time, Taylor starts to go "cold turkey", withdrawing from the (Subutex) drug he had become dependent on.

After forcing Taylor to steal a knife from the kitchen, Dee blackmails him into going to kill Gaz and Paul with it, claiming that Dee will get his friends on the outside to kill Adam if Taylor does not go through with it. A day before Taylor is set to be released, he cooks Dee a meal before leaving to kill Gaz and Paul while he cuts their hair. Taylor, however, does not go through with it, returning to his cell to find Dee having overdosed on the drugs he had spiked his food with. Dee realises what has happened, and after a brief fight, he slumps over, exhausted. Taylor shares his joint with Dee before Dee dies. The next morning Taylor sets Dee up in his bed to make it look as if Dee overdosed in the night. Later that day, Taylor is released, and a prisoner films him leaving the grounds.

== Cast ==
- David Jonsson as Taylor
- Tom Blyth as Dee
- Corin Silva as Gaz
- Alex Hassell as Paul
- Neil Linpow as Robbie
- Paul Hilton as Browning
- Layton Blake as Maxi
- Jack Barker as Cook Up Prisoner
- Fred Muthui as Prisoner in Cell

== Production ==
The film is directed by Cal McMau and written by Hunter Andrews and Eoin Doran. It was originally planned to be directed by the Safdie brothers, but they decided to make Uncut Gems instead. It is produced by Bankside Films and produced by Sophia Gibber and Myles Payne of Agile Films with Philip Barantini and Samantha Beddoe’s It’s All Made Up Productions and Hoopsa Films.

Principal photography took place in London and Somerset in the summer of 2024. Filming locations included Shepton Mallet Prison.

The film was shot by Lorenzo Levrini, with an original score composed and produced by British artist Matthew Barnes, known as Forest Swords.

== Release ==
The film premiered in the Centrepiece programme at the 2025 Toronto International Film Festival. The film was released in the United Kingdom on 20 February 2026. Sunrise Films acquired United States distribution, releasing it theatrically in the US on 17 April 2026.

== Reception ==
On the review aggregator website Rotten Tomatoes, 100% of 53 critics' reviews are positive, with an average rating of 7.8/10. The website's consensus reads: "A prison picture with a terrific pair of lead performances by David Jonsson and Tom Blyth, Wasteman is harrowing, superbly acted across the board, and revealing about the incentives for violence in the correctional system." Metacritic, which uses a weighted average, assigned the film a score of 76 out of 100, based on 12 critics, indicating "generally favorable" reviews.

Selina Sonderman of The Upcoming wrote, "In an immersive journey, Wasteman escalates from gritty prison drama to pulse-pounding suspense, powered by its remarkable co-leads firing on all cylinders."

Brian Tallerico at RogerEbert.com said, "there’s a spark that the film gains from these two young performers that's never extinguished."

=== Accolades ===
Award / Festival	Date of ceremony	Category	Recipient(s)	Result	Ref.
British Independent Film Awards	30 November 2025	Best Lead Performance	David Jonsson	Nominated	
British Independent Film Awards	30 November 2025	Best Supporting Performance	Tom Blyth	Nominated	
British Independent Film Awards	30 November 2025	Best Music Supervision	Phil Canning	Nominated	
British Independent Film Awards	30 November 2025	Douglas Hickox Award (Best Debut Director)	Cal McMau	Won	
British Independent Film Awards	30 November 2025	Best Debut Screenwriter	Hunter Andrews and Eoin Doran	Nominated	
BAFTAs	26 February 2026	Outstanding Debut by a British Writer, Director, or Producer	Cal McMau, Hunter Andrews, Eoin Doran	Nominated	
National Film Awards UK	1 July 2026	Best Drama	Wasteman	Nominated	
National Film Awards UK	1 July 2026	Best Feature Film	Wasteman	Nominated	
National Film Awards UK	1 July 2026	Best Actor	David Jonsson	Nominated	
National Film Awards UK	1 July 2026	Best Supporting Actor	Alex Hassell	Nominated	
National Film Awards UK	1 July 2026	Best Producer	Sophia Gibber & Myles Payne	Nominated	
National Film Awards UK	1 July 2026	Best Action in a Film	Wasteman	Nominated	
National Film Awards UK	1 July 2026	Best British Film	Wasteman	Nominated	
National Film Awards UK	1 July 2026	Best Film Production Company	Agile Films	Nominated	
