= Lighton baronets =

Baronetcy in the Baronetage of Ireland

- Escutcheon of the Lighton baronets of Merville
- Creation date: 1791
- Status: extant

The Lighton Baronetcy, of Merville in Dublin, is a title in the Baronetage of Ireland. It was created on 1 March 1791 for the Dublin-based banker and politician Thomas Lighton. Sir Thomas was an Ulsterman, being a native of Strabane in the west of County Tyrone. After falling on hard times, he sought work as a private and interpreter in the East India Company in India. In the early 1790s he had No. 22 St. Stephen's Green North built as his Dublin residence. This house is now The Cliff Townhouse, an upmarket boutique hotel, bar and restaurant. He sat as a Member of the Irish Parliament for Tuam from 1790 to 1797 and Carlingford from 1798 to 1800. His partner in the banking firm of Lighton, Needham & Shaw, Robert Shaw, was created a baronet in 1821 (see Shaw baronets).

The 7th and 8th baronets are buried together in North Berwick Cemetery in East Lothian, Scotland. The graves lie in the extreme south-east corner.

== Lighton baronets, of Merville (1791) ==
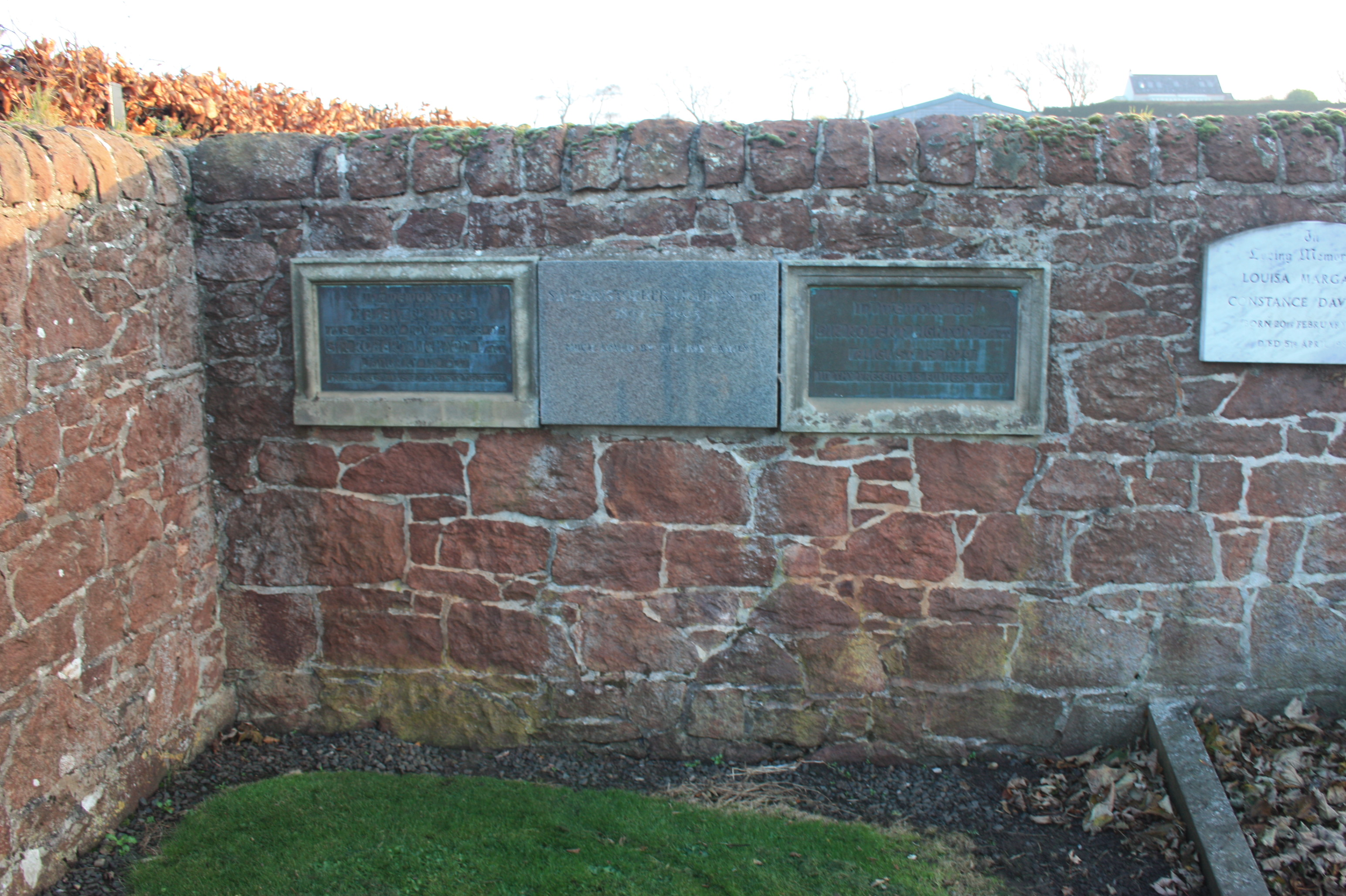
The grave of the Lighton baronets, North Berwick Cemetery

- Sir Thomas Lighton, 1st Baronet (died 1805)
- Sir Thomas Lighton, 2nd Baronet (1787–1816)
- Sir Thomas Lighton, 3rd Baronet (1814–1817)
- Sir John Lees Lighton, 4th Baronet (1792–1827)
- Sir John Hamilton Lighton, 5th Baronet (1818–1844)
- Sir Christopher Robert Lighton, 6th Baronet (1819–1875)
- Sir Christopher Robert Lighton, 7th Baronet (1848–1929)
- Sir Christopher Robert Lighton, 8th Baronet (1897–1993)
- Sir Thomas Hamilton Lighton, 9th Baronet (born 1954)

The heir apparent is the present holder's eldest son James Christopher Hamilton Lighton (born 1992).
