= British Independent Film Awards 2019 =

- Date: 1 December 2019
- Location: Old Billingsgate, London, United Kingdom
- Website: www.bifa.film

The British Independent Film Awards 2019 were held on 1 December 2019 to recognise the best in British independent cinema and filmmaking talent from United Kingdom. The nominations were announced on 30 October 2019. The Personal History of David Copperfield led the nominations with 11, followed by Wild Rose with 10.

== Winners and nominees ==
Best British Independent Film	Best Director
For Sama; Bait; The Personal History of David Copperfield; The Souvenir; Wild Rose	Waad Al-Khateab & Edward Watts - For Sama; Oliver Hermanus - Moffie; Joanna Hogg - The Souvenir; Mark Jenkin - Bait; Asif Kapadia - Diego Maradona
Best Actor	Best Actress
Josh O'Connor - Only You as Jake; Sam Adewunmi - The Last Tree as Femi; Tom Burke - The Souvenir as Anthony; Kris Hitchen - Sorry We Missed You as Ricky Turner; Dev Patel - The Personal History of David Copperfield as David Copperfield	Renée Zellweger - Judy as Judy Garland; Jessie Buckley - Wild Rose as Rose-Lynn Harlan; Holliday Grainger - Animals as Laura; Sally Hawkins - Eternal Beauty as June; Vicky Knight - Dirty God as Jade
Best Supporting Actor	Best Supporting Actress
Hugh Laurie - The Personal History of David Copperfield as Mr. Dick; Chiwetel Ejiofor - The Boy Who Harnessed the Wind as Trywell Kamkwamba; Edlison Manuel Olbera Núñez - Yuli: The Carlos Acosta Story as Young Carlos Acosta; Peter Mullan - The Vanishing as Thomas Marshall; Bluey Robinson - Dirty God as Naz	Ruthxjiah Bellenea - The Last Tree as Tope; Jessica Barden - Scarborough as Beth; Elizabeth Debicki - Vita and Virginia as Virginia Woolf; Tilda Swinton - The Personal History of David Copperfield as Betsey Trotwood; Julie Walters - Wild Rose as Marion Harlan
Best Screenplay	Most Promising Newcomer
Simon Blackwell & Armando Iannucci - The Personal History of David Copperfield; Joanna Hogg - The Souvenir; Paul Laverty - Sorry We Missed You; Peter Strickland - In Fabric; Nicole Taylor - Wild Rose	Sam Adewunmi - The Last Tree; Honor Swinton Byrne - The Souvenir; Vicky Knight - Dirty God; Lorn Macdonald - Beats; Roxanne Scrimshaw - Lynn + Lucy
The Douglas Hickox Award (Best Debut Director)	Best Debut Screenwriter
Harry Wootliff - Only You; Will Becher and Richard Phelan - A Shaun the Sheep Movie: Farmageddon; Fyzal Boulifa - Lynn + Lucy; Daniel Kokotajlo (director) - Boyz in the Wood; Chiwetel Ejiofor - The Boy Who Harnessed the Wind	Emma Jane Unsworth - Animals; Kieran Hurley - Beats; Lisa Owens - Days of the Bagnold Summer; Nicole Taylor - Wild Rose; Harry Wootliff - Only You
Breakthrough Producer	The Discovery Award
Kate Byers and Linn Waite - Bait; Finn Bruce - Tucked; Joy Gharoro-Akpojotor - Blue Story; Becky Read - Three Identical Strangers; Jack Sidey - Moffie	Children of the Snow Land - Zara Balfour, Marcus Stephenson and Mark Hakansson; A Bump Along The Way - Shelly Love; Here For Life - Adrian Jackson & Andrea Luka Zimmerman, James Lingwood, Michael Morris and Cressida Day Cunningham, Rebecca Mark-Lawson, David Arthur, Ellie Land; Muscle - Gerard Johnson, Matthew James Wilkinson, Richard Wylie, Ed Barratt; The Street – Zed Nelson
Best Documentary	Best British Short Film
For Sama; Coup 53; Diego Maradona; Seahorse; Tell Me Who I Am	Anna; Boiling Point; The Devil's Harmony; Goldfish; Serious Tingz
Best International Independent Film	Best Casting
Parasite; Ash Is Purest White; Marriage Story; Monos; Portrait of a Lady on Fire	Sarah Crowe- The Personal History of David Copperfield; Shaheen Baig - In Fabric; Shaheen Baig and Aisha Bywaters - The Last Tree; Kahleen Crawford - Wild Rose; Kahleen Crawford and Caroline Stewart - Only You
Best Cinematography	Best Costume Design
Benjamin Kračun - Beats; Ole Bratt Birkeland - Judy; Zac Nicholson - The Personal History of David Copperfield; Jamie D. Ramsay - Moffie; Ari Wegner - In Fabric	Suzie Harman & Robert Worley - The Personal History of David Copperfield; Anna Robbins - Wild Rose; Grace Snell - The Souvenir; Jany Temime - Judy; Jo Thompson - In Fabric
Best Editing	Best Effects
Chloe Lambourne & Simon McMahon - For Sama; Mick Audsley and Peter Lambert - The Personal History of David Copperfield; Mark Jenkin - Bait; Chris King - Diego Maradona; Helle Le Fevre - The Souvenir	Howard Jones - A Shaun the Sheep Movie: Farmageddon; Paul Mann - In Fabric; Andy Quinn - The Boy Who Harnessed the Wind
Best Make Up & Hair Design	Best Music
Jeremy Woodhead - Judy; Morten Jacobsen, Rogier Samuels, Lindelotte Van Der Meer - Dirty God; Karen Hartley-Thomas - The Personal History of David Copperfield; Emma Scott - In Fabric; Jody Williams - Wild Rose	Jack Arnold - Wild Rose; Nainita Desai - For Sama; Tim Gane - In Fabric; Antônio Pinto - Diego Maradona; JD Twitch, Penelope Trappes and Stephen Hindman - Beats
Best Production Design	Best Sound
Cristina Casali - The Personal History of David Copperfield; Stéphane Collonge - The Souvenir; Kave Quinn - Judy; Anne Seibel - The White Crow; Paki Smith - In Fabric	Beats - David Bowtle-Mcmillan, Joakim Sundström, Robert Farr; Diego Maradona - Stephen Griffiths, Tim Cavagin, Max Walsh, Andy Shelley; Gwen - Anna My Bertmark, Jonathan Seale, Jules Woods; In Fabric - Martin Pavey; Wild Rose - Lee Walpole, Colin Nicholson, Stuart Hilliker

=== Films with multiple nominations and awards ===
Films that received multiple nominations
Nominations	Film
11	The Personal History of David Copperfield
10	Wild Rose
9	In Fabric
8	The Souvenir
5	Beats
5	Diego Maradona
5	For Sama
5	Judy
4	Bait
4	Dirty God
4	The Last Tree
4	Only You
3	The Boy Who Harnessed the Wind
3	Moffie
2	Animals
2	Lynn + Lucy
2	A Shaun the Sheep Movie: Farmageddon
2	Sorry We Missed You

Films that received multiple awards
Awards	Film
5	The Personal History of David Copperfield
4	For Sama
2	Beats
2	Only You
2	The Last Tree
2	Judy
