= Ellis Howard =

English actor (born 1997)

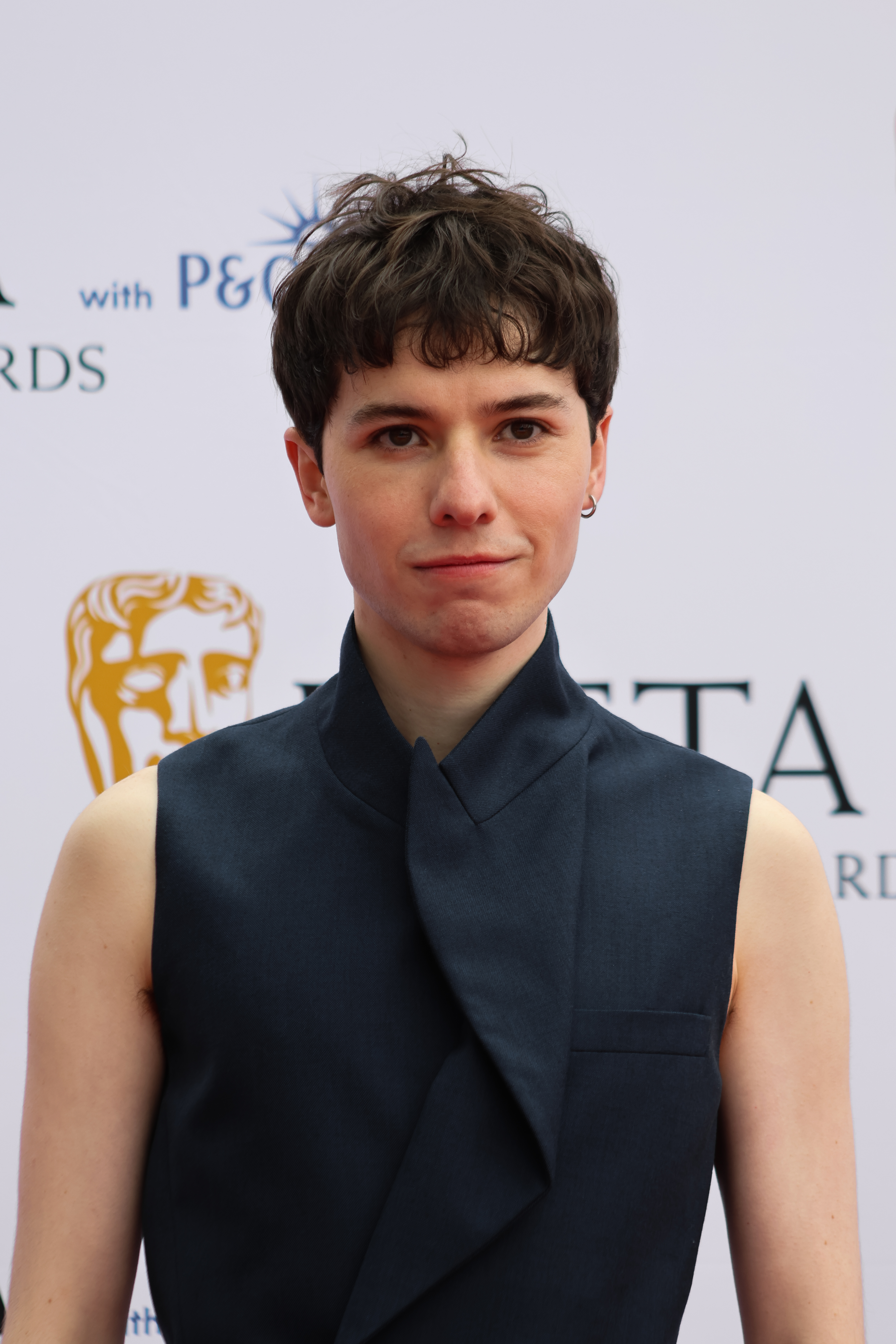
- Howard at the 2026 British Academy Television Awards
- Born: Ellis Francis Howard; 1997 (age 28–29); Liverpool, England
- Occupations: Actor; writer
- Years active: 2019–present

Ellis Francis Howard (born c. 1997) is an English actor and writer. On television, he is known for his roles in the BBC Three series Red Rose (2022) and What It Feels Like for a Girl (2025). He received a British Academy Television Award nomination for the latter.

== Early life and education ==
Howard was born in Liverpool and grew up in Norris Green. His father is a dockworker and his mother an NHS worker.

Howard took acting classes at local performing arts school Rare Studio and was a member of the UK Youth Parliament scheme before studying acting at the Guildhall School of Music and Drama, graduating in 2018. He was a member of the National Youth Theatre.

== Acting career ==
- In 2019, Howard played Ivan VI of Russia in the HBO miniseries Catherine the Great.
- In 2022, Howard played Antony Longwell in the BBC Three horror drama series Red Rose.
- In 2023, Howard played Dill Harris in To Kill a Mockingbird at the Gielgud Theatre.
- In 2025, Howard played the lead role in the BBC Three drama series What It Feels Like for a Girl, based on the life story of Paris Lees.

== Awards and nominations ==
Year	Award	Category	Work	Result	Ref.
2025	The Digital Spy Reader Awards	TV - British Rising Star	What It Feels Like for a Girl	2nd place	
2026	RTS Programme Awards	Breakthrough Award	What It Feels Like for a Girl	Nominated	
2026	BAFTA Television Awards	Leading Actor	What It Feels Like for a Girl	Nominated	

== Other activities ==
Howard is writing and developing a television drama, based on his experiences at the Guildhall School of Music and Drama, with Toheeb Jimoh and developing an autobiographical show for Netflix.

Along with other members of his family, Howard runs a non-profit initiative, Step Up For Scousers, which collects and donates unsold toys and household supplies to local families. The goods are distributed through the Fans Supporting Foodbanks network set up by Ian Byrne, MP for West Derby.
