= Benjamin Kračun =

Scottish cinematographer

- Born: May 1981 (age 45)
- Education: Napier University; National Film and Television School
- Occupation: Cinematographer
- Years active: 2003–present

Benjamin Kračun (/ˈkrɑːkən/; born May 1981) is a Scottish cinematographer. He is best known for his work on Emerald Fennell's revenge thriller Promising Young Woman (2020) and Coralie Fargeat's body horror film The Substance (2024), the latter of which earned him the European Film Award for Best Cinematographer. He is a full accredited member of the British Society of Cinematographers. In June 2023, Kračun was invited to join the Cinematographers branch of the Academy of Motion Picture Arts and Sciences.

== Early life and education ==
Kračun grew up in a small town in Scotland, a child of immigrant parents. His father is Croatian and his mother is German. Kračun graduated from Napier University and subsequently won a place on the cinematography course at the prestigious National Film and Television School (NFTS).

== Filmography ==
=== Feature film ===
Year	Title	Director
2012	The Comedian	Tom Shkolnik
2013	For Those in Peril	Paul Wright
2014	Hyena	Gerard Johnson
2017	Beast	Michael Pearce
2019	Beats	Brian Welsh
2019	Monsoon	Hong Khaou
2020	Promising Young Woman	Emerald Fennell
2021	Encounter	Michael Pearce
2024	The Substance	Coralie Fargeat
2025	Echo Valley	Michael Pearce
TBA	Cry to Heaven	Tom Ford

Documentary film

Year	Title	Director	Notes
2011	Without Gorky	Cosima Spender	With Ula Pontikos and Cosima Spender
2015	Dark Horse	Louise Osmond	

=== Short film ===
Year	Title	Director	Notes
2003	Break	Ian Waugh	
2005	Laddy and the Lady	Henry Coombes	
2007	Gralloch	Henry Coombes	
2008	One in Four	Matti Harju	
2008	Plane Days	Himself; Ewan McNicol	Also writer
2008	Smile	Ian Clark	
2009	Believe	Paul Wright	
2009	The Bedfords	Henry Coombes	
2010	I Love Luci	Colin Kennedy	
2010	Rite	Michael Pearce	
2011	Afrikka	Matti Harju	
2012	Once and for All	Ben Strebel	
2012	Gallop	Michael Pearce	
2013	Keeping Up with the Joneses	Michael Pearce	
2013	Belt	Charles Henri Belleville	
2015	Atis	Daniel Mulloy	
2016	Ana	Paul Nicholls	
2019	Harry Potter: Wizards Unite	William McGregor	Commercial

=== Television ===
TV movies

Year	Title	Director
2010	One Night in Emergency	Michael Offer
2014	Glasgow Girls	Brian Welsh

TV series

Year	Title	Director	Notes
2016	Murder	Robert Jones	Episode "Lost Weekend"
2016	The Tunnel	Mike Barker	2 episodes
2019	Dublin Murders	Saul Dibb	2 episodes
2020	The Third Day	Marc Munden	Part 1: Summer (3 episodes)

== Awards and nominations ==
Award	Year	Category	Film	Result	Ref.
Austin Film Critics Association	2025	Best Cinematography	The Substance	Nominated	
British Independent Film Awards	2019	Best Cinematography	Beats	Won	
Chlotrudis Society for Independent Films	2021	Best Cinematography	Monsoon	Nominated	
Columbus Film Critics Association	2025	Best Cinematography	The Substance	Nominated	
European Film Awards	2024	European Cinematography	The Substance	Won	
Indiana Film Journalists Association	2024	Best Cinematography	The Substance	Nominated	
Leeds International Film Festival	2008	Best International Documentary Short	Plane Days	Won	
Manaki Brothers Film Festival	2010	Small Golden Camera 300 Award	I Love Luci	Nominated	
St. Louis Film Critics Association	2021	Best Cinematography	Promising Young Woman	Nominated	
