= Lorn Macdonald =

Scottish actor and director

- Born: Lorn Alexander Macdonald; 10 September 1992 (age 34); Kirkcaldy, Scotland
- Education: Royal Conservatoire of Scotland
- Occupation: Actor
- Years active: 2015–present
- Known for: Beats

Lorn Alexander Macdonald (born 10 September 1992) is a Scottish actor and director. Born in Kirkcaldy, he studied acting at the Royal Conservatoire of Scotland.

He is known for his Scottish BAFTA winning performance as Spanner in the 2019 film Beats. He starred as Mark Renton in an acclaimed production of Trainspotting in 2016 at the Citizens Theatre in Glasgow. Joyce McMillan of The Scotsman praised his "intensely physical and charismatic performance as the Polish Prince Segismundo" in Life Is A Dream (Royal Lyceum Theatre), which won him "Best Male Performance" at the 2022 Critics' Awards for Theatre in Scotland

== Film ==
Year	Title	Role	Director	Notes
2019	Beats	Spanner	Brian Welsh	
2022	The Strange Case of Dr Jekyll and Mr Hyde	Dr Gabriel Utterson	Hope Dickson Leach	Theatre-film hybrid filmed at Leith Theatre
2024	Tummy Monster	Tales	Ciaran Lyons	

== Television ==
Year	Title	Role	Notes	Ref.
2011	Neverland	Fox	Series 1	
2015	World's End	Gregor Campbell	31 episodes	
2019	Shetland	Jamie Hayes	Series 5, all episodes	
2020	Deadwater Fell	PC Taylor Clarke	4 episodes	
2020–2026	Bridgerton	Albion Finch	13 episodes	
2022	The Lazarus Project	Blake	Series 1, 8 episodes	
2024–2026	Dinosaur	Lee	Series 1 and 2, all episodes	
2025	What It Feels Like for a Girl	Tony the Skank	Episode 2	
2025	Coldwater	Angus	Episodes 1-3	

== Theatre ==
Year	Title	Role	Company	Director	Notes
2016	Trainspotting	Mark Renton	Citizens Theatre, Glasgow	Gareth Nicholls	
2016	This Restless House	Orestes	Citizens Theatre, Glasgow	Dominic Hill	Zinnie Harris's adaptation of Oresteia
2018	Long Day's Journey into Night	Edmund Tyrone	Citizens Theatre, Glasgow	Dominic Hill	
2021	Life Is a Dream	Segismundo	Lyceum Theatre, Edinburgh	Wils Wilson	
2025	The Seagull	Konstantin	Lyceum Theatre, Edinburgh	James Brining	Mike Poulton's adaptation of the play by Anton Chekhov
