= Toby Kebbell =

British actor (born 1982)

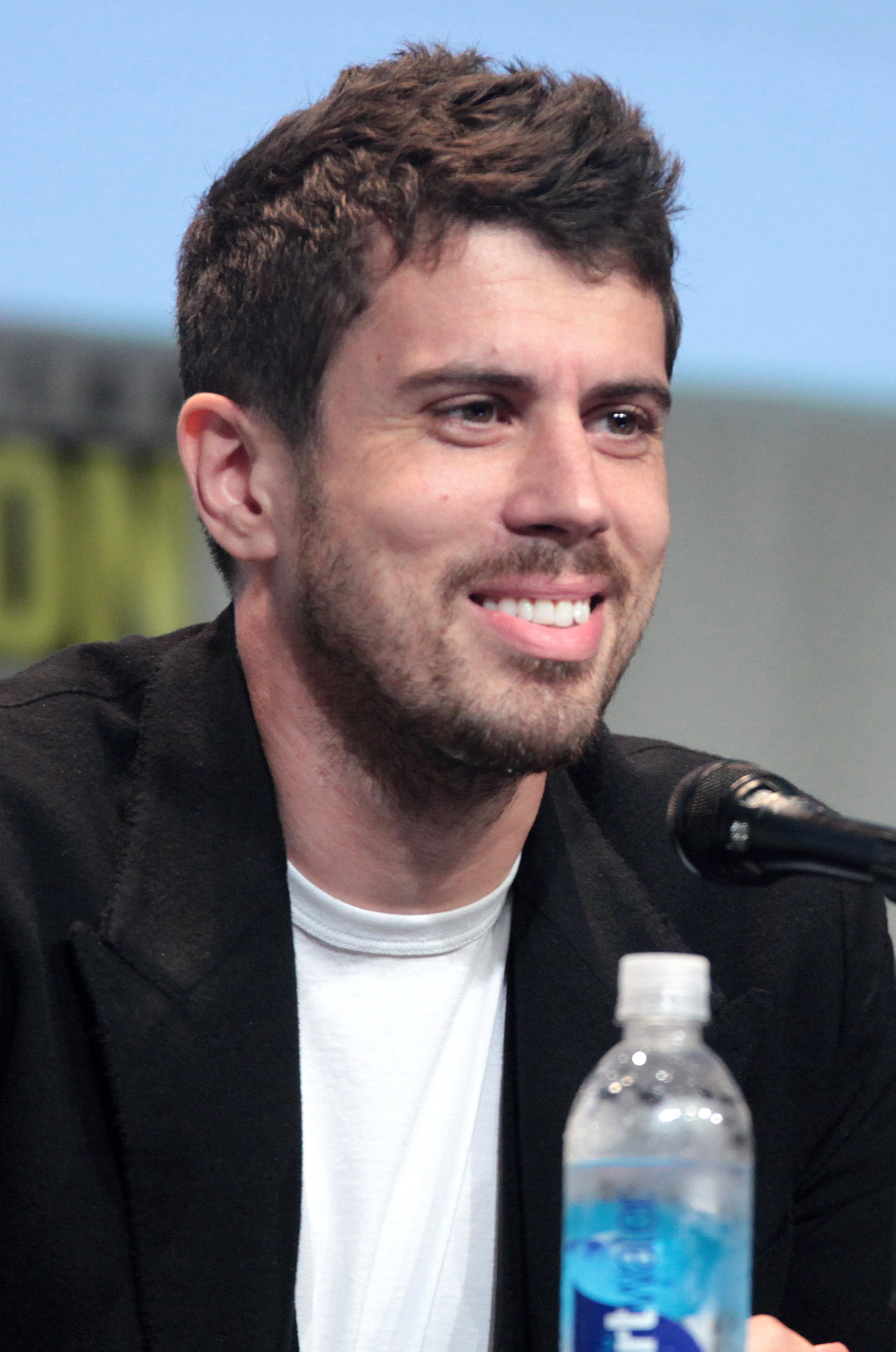
- Kebbell at the 2015 San Diego Comic-Con
- Born: Tobias Alistair Patrick Kebbell; 9 July 1982 (age 44); Pontefract, West Yorkshire, England
- Education: Central Junior Television Workshop
- Occupation: Actor
- Years active: 2000–present
- Spouse: Arielle Wyatt (m. 2020)
- Children: 1

Tobias Alistair Patrick Kebbell (born 9 July 1982) is an English actor. He is known for his roles in films such as Dead Man's Shoes (2004), Control (2007), RocknRolla (2008), Prince of Persia: The Sands of Time (2010), The Sorcerer's Apprentice (2010), War Horse (2011), Wrath of the Titans (2012), Dawn of the Planet of the Apes (2014), Fantastic Four (2015), Warcraft (2016), A Monster Calls (2016), Ben-Hur (2016), Gold (2016), and Bloodshot (2020). He is also known for his work in the Black Mirror episode "The Entire History of You" (2011) and starred in the MonsterVerse film Kong: Skull Island (2017) and the Apple TV+ series Servant (2019–2023) and For All Mankind (2023–present).

== Early life ==
Kebbell, the fourth of five children, was born on 9 July 1982 in Pontefract, West Yorkshire, but grew up in Newark on Trent, Nottinghamshire where he attended The Grove School (now the Newark Academy) in Balderton. He was brought up by his mother, Michelle (née Mathers), a cook and landscape gardener, and his father, Robert Kebbell, an engineer from Zimbabwe. He was raised Catholic and attended a Catholic primary school.

Kebbell trained in acting at the Central Junior Television Workshop in Nottingham along with Andrew Shim and Vicky McClure.

== Career ==
Kebbell's first movie appearance was as Anthony, a young man with a learning difficulty, in the Shane Meadows directed Dead Man's Shoes. He was nominated for Most Promising Newcomer at the British Independent Film Awards 2004 The same year, Kebbell appeared in Oliver Stone's Alexander and Woody Allen's Match Point.

In 2007, Kebbell played Rob Gretton, the manager of Joy Division in Anton Corbijn's award-winning biopic of Ian Curtis, Control, for which his performance won the Best Supporting Actor Award at the British Independent Film Awards 2007. He was also nominated for the London Film Critics Circle Awards 2007 Best Supporting British Actor Award.

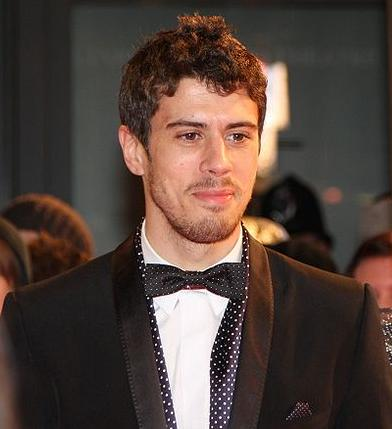
Kebbell at the Orange British Academy Film Awards in 2009

In December 2007, Kebbell took the lead in an episode of season 2 of Jimmy McGovern's BBC series The Street, which subsequently won the BAFTA for Best Drama series. His other work for the BBC included a modern retelling of Macbeth alongside James McAvoy, while his theatre roles included spells at the Almeida Theatre in David Hare's reworking of Maxim Gorky's Enemies and at the Playhouse in R.C. Sherriff's classic, Journey's End.

In September 2008, Kebbell was featured in RocknRolla (winner of the Empire Award for Best British Film), written and directed by Guy Ritchie, alongside actors Tom Wilkinson, Gerard Butler and Thandiwe Newton. Kebbell played a heroin-addicted musician, Johnny Quid, for which he was nominated for BAFTA Orange Rising Star Award of the 2009 BAFTA Awards, an award voted for by the public. Kebbell was also nominated for the Empire Award for Best Newcomer, but lost out to his friend Gemma Arterton. Kebbell appeared in the 2009 film Cheri, directed by Stephen Frears, in which he took a small role alongside Michelle Pfeiffer. He filmed in Morocco and London with Jake Gyllenhaal for Prince of Persia: Sands of Time.

In 2011, Kebbell played a leading role in "The Entire History of You", the finale of the first series of Charlie Brooker's anthology series Black Mirror, which was written by Jesse Armstrong. Robert Downey Jr. has since bought the rights to adapt the script for a forthcoming film.

In 2014, Kebbell took over the role of Koba in the sequel Dawn of the Planet of the Apes.

Kebbell played the Marvel antagonist, Doctor Doom, in the 2015 Fantastic Four film, and an orc, Durotan, in the 2016 Warcraft. He played Jack Chapman in the monster film Kong: Skull Island (2017), while also providing guidance for Kong's motion capture sequences.

== Acting credits ==
=== Film ===
Year	Title	Role	Notes
2004	Dead Man's Shoes	Anthony	
2004	Northern Soul	Mark Sherbert	Short film
2004	Alexander	Pausanias of Orestis	
2005	Match Point	Policeman	
2006	Wilderness	Callum	
2007	Control	Rob Gretton	
2008	RocknRolla	Johnny Quid	
2008	The German	Barton	Short film
2008	Clubbed	Man in queue (voice)	Uncredited
2009	Cheri	Patron	
2010	Prince of Persia: The Sands of Time	Prince Garsiv	
2010	The Sorcerer's Apprentice	Drake Stone	
2010	The Conspirator	John Wilkes Booth	
2011	The Veteran	Robert Miller	
2011	War Horse	Colin	
2012	Wrath of the Titans	Agenor	
2013	The East	Doc / Thomas Ayres	
2013	The Counselor	Tony	
2014	Dawn of the Planet of the Apes	Koba	
2015	Fantastic Four	Victor Von Doom / Dr. Doom	
2015	Buddha's Little Finger	Pyotr Voyd	
2016	Warcraft	Durotan / Antonidas	
2016	Ben-Hur	Messala Severus	
2016	A Monster Calls	Dad	
2016	Gold	Agent Paul Jennings	
2017	Kong: Skull Island	Jacksford "Jack" Chapman / Kong	Motion capture for Kong
2017	The Female Brain	Kevin	
2017	War for the Planet of the Apes	Koba	
2018	A Wizard's Tale	Terry Dexter (voice)	
2018	The Hurricane Heist	Will	
2018	Destroyer	Silas Howe	
2018	The Angel	Danny Aroya	
2019	Daniel	James Foley	
2020	Becoming	Alex	
2020	Bloodshot	Martin Axe	
2025	Salvable	Sal	
2026	I Play Rocky	Robert Chartoff	

=== Television ===
Year	Title	Role	Notes
2000	Peak Practice	Graham	Episode: "Keeping Up the Act"
2005	ShakespeaRe-Told	Malcolm	Episode: "Macbeth"
2006	Born Equal	Beggar 2	Television film
2007	The Commander: Windows of the Soul	Jimmy Bannerman	Television film
2007	The Street	Paul Billerton	3 episodes
2011	Black Mirror	Liam Foxwell	Episode: "The Entire History of You"
2013	The Escape Artist	Liam Foyle	3 episodes
2018	Dream Corp LLC	Patient 101 / Leslie Krux	Episode: "The Krux"
2019–2023	Servant	Sean Turner	Main role
2023–present	For All Mankind	Miles Dale	Main role (season 4–present)

=== Video games ===
Year	Title	Voice role	Notes
2011	Star Wars: The Old Republic	Additional voices	

=== Music videos ===
Year	Title	Artist	Role
2020	"Clarity"	Saleka	

== Awards and nominations ==
Year	Award	Category	Work	Result	Ref
2004	British Independent Film Awards 2004	Most Promising Newcomer	Dead Man's Shoes	Nominated	
2007	British Independent Film Awards 2007	Best Supporting Actor/Actress	Control	Won	
2007	London Film Critics Circle Awards 2007	British Supporting Actor of the Year	Control	Nominated	
2008	62nd British Academy Film Awards	Orange Rising Star Award	—N/a	Nominated	
2009	14th Empire Awards	Best Newcomer	RocknRolla	Nominated	
