= The Rack Pack =

2016 British film

- Written by: Mark Chappell; Alan Connor; Shaun Pye
- Directed by: Brian Welsh
- Country of origin: United Kingdom
- Original language: English

Production
- Producer: Barney Reisz
- Cinematography: Zac Nicholson
- Editor: Ben Yeates
- Production company: Zeppotron

Original release
- Network: BBC iPlayer
- Release: 17 January 2016

The Rack Pack is a 2016 British comedy-drama television film about professional snooker during the 1970s through the 1980s, focusing on the intense rivalry between Alex Higgins and Steve Davis. The film is directed by Brian Welsh and was released on BBC iPlayer on 17 January 2016.

== Cast ==
- Luke Treadaway as Alex Higgins
- Will Merrick as Steve Davis
- Kevin Bishop as Barry Hearn
- Nichola Burley as Lynn Higgins
- James Bailey as Jimmy White
- Daniel Fearn as Robbo
- John Sessions as Ted Lowe
- Tom Fisher as Pete
- Rob Crouch as Oliver Reed
- Russ Bain as Cliff Thorburn
- Marc McCardie as Tony Knowles
- Caolan Byrne as Dennis Taylor
- Gary Davis as Bill Werbeniuk
- Jimmy Watkins as Terry Griffiths
- Konstantine Osipenkov as Willie Thorne

== Release ==
BBC released The Rack Pack in January 2016 as an exclusive on its media service iPlayer to be available for 12 months. The Guardian's Mark Lawson said while this was not the first exclusive on BBC's service, "It clearly feels the most ambitious, and the one that might otherwise have been expected to be conventionally screened." The film ranked in the top twenty requested programmes on iPlayer for January and racked up over a million requests in its first three months of release. It had its television premiere on BBC Two later in the year.

== Reception ==
Rachel Ward of The Daily Telegraph said of the film's comedy, "The humour was gentle, coming from a wry recognition of the era's excesses." She said, "The film expertly gave depth to the character of Davis, with Merrick managing to convey a controlled stillness, as the future six-time world champion grew from nerdy teenager to confident ace."
