= Comedy Playhouse (series 16) =

Series 16 of a BBC television programme

The sixteenth series of Comedy Playhouse, the long-running BBC series, aired during 2014, with only three episodes.

== Background ==
The sixteenth series, consisted of three episodes, each of which had a different cast and storyline. It was announced that Miller's Mountain was going to be made into a series, whereas Monks was not. No decision was announced regarding Over to Bill.

Miller's Mountain was renamed Mountain Goats and a six-part series aired on BBC One from 14 August 2015. The series received overwhelmingly negative reviews.

== Episodes ==
Title	Writer(s)	Airdate	Duration	Overview
Over to Bill	Doug Naylor	29 April 2014	30 mins	When BBC weatherman Bill Onion (Hugh Dennis) is fired in a departmental shake-up, a blackly farcical train of events begins which ends in his humiliation in front of a prospective employer from another network. Also starring Neil Morrissey as Jez.
Miller's Mountain	Donald McLeary	6 May 2014	30 mins	A hugely energetic studio sitcom set around the antics of Jimmy Miller (Jimmy Chisholm) and his ragtag family of Mountain Rescue volunteers. When the naïve and enthusiastic Conor reports for his first day as a volunteer, Jimmy, the shambolic old rescue hand takes it upon himself to teach him the 'ways of the hills'. It won best comedy/entertainment program at the 2014 British Academy Scotland Awards and in 2015 was progressed to a 6-part series for BBC Scotland called Mountain Goats.
Monks	Danny Robins	13 May 2014	30 mins	Gary Woodcroft (Seann Walsh) is in his late 20s and has never done a single useful thing in his life. He's been the living definition of the word 'chillax', straddling a narrow line between unemployed and unemployable. Then, after years of dubious benefit claiming, he finds himself finally threatened with prosecution. Faced with the real prospect of prison, he decides to do what anyone would... run away and hide in his local monastery. Also starring James Fleet as the Abbot.
