= Maiden Lane Estate =

Housing estate in London

Coordinates: 51.5420°N 0.1280°W

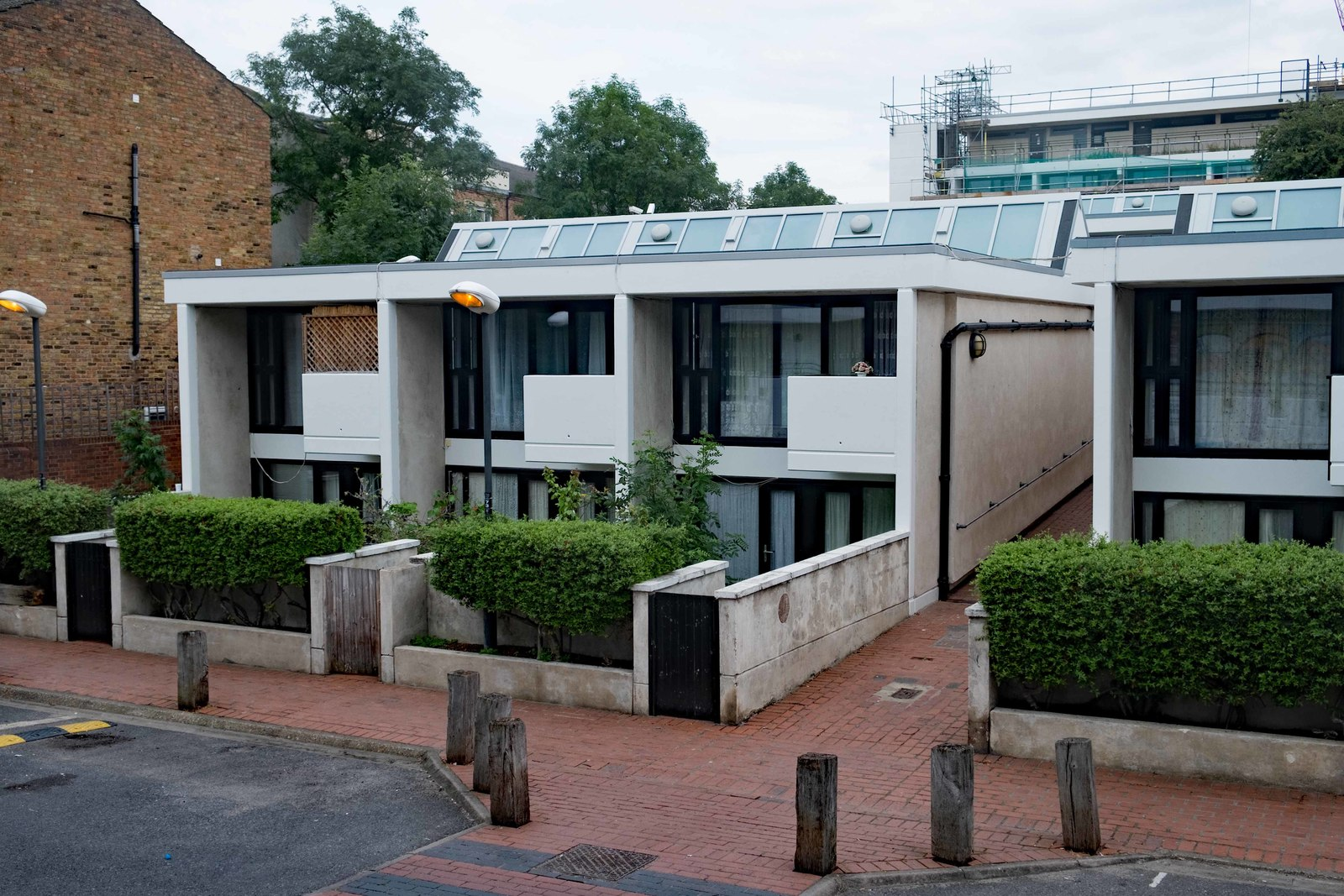
- Houses on the Maiden Lane Estate
- Interactive map of Maiden Lane Estate

General information
- Location: Camden Town, London, England

Construction
- Constructed: 1979-1982
- Architect: Gordon Benson and Alan Forsyth
- Style: Modernist

Other information
- Governing body: London Borough of Camden
- Famous residents: Samuel Adewunmi; Tox

The Maiden Lane Estate is a housing estate in Camden, located beside York Way and several railway lines. It was designed by the architects Gordon Benson and Alan Forsyth, and built between 1979 and 1982.

== Notable residents ==
- Samuel Adewunmi, actor

== References and sources ==
References

- Maiden Lane, Modern Architecture London
- 'The Architecture of the Maiden Lane Estate: A second opinion', Bill Hillier et al. http://discovery.ucl.ac.uk/1751/
