= Samuel Adewunmi =

British actor

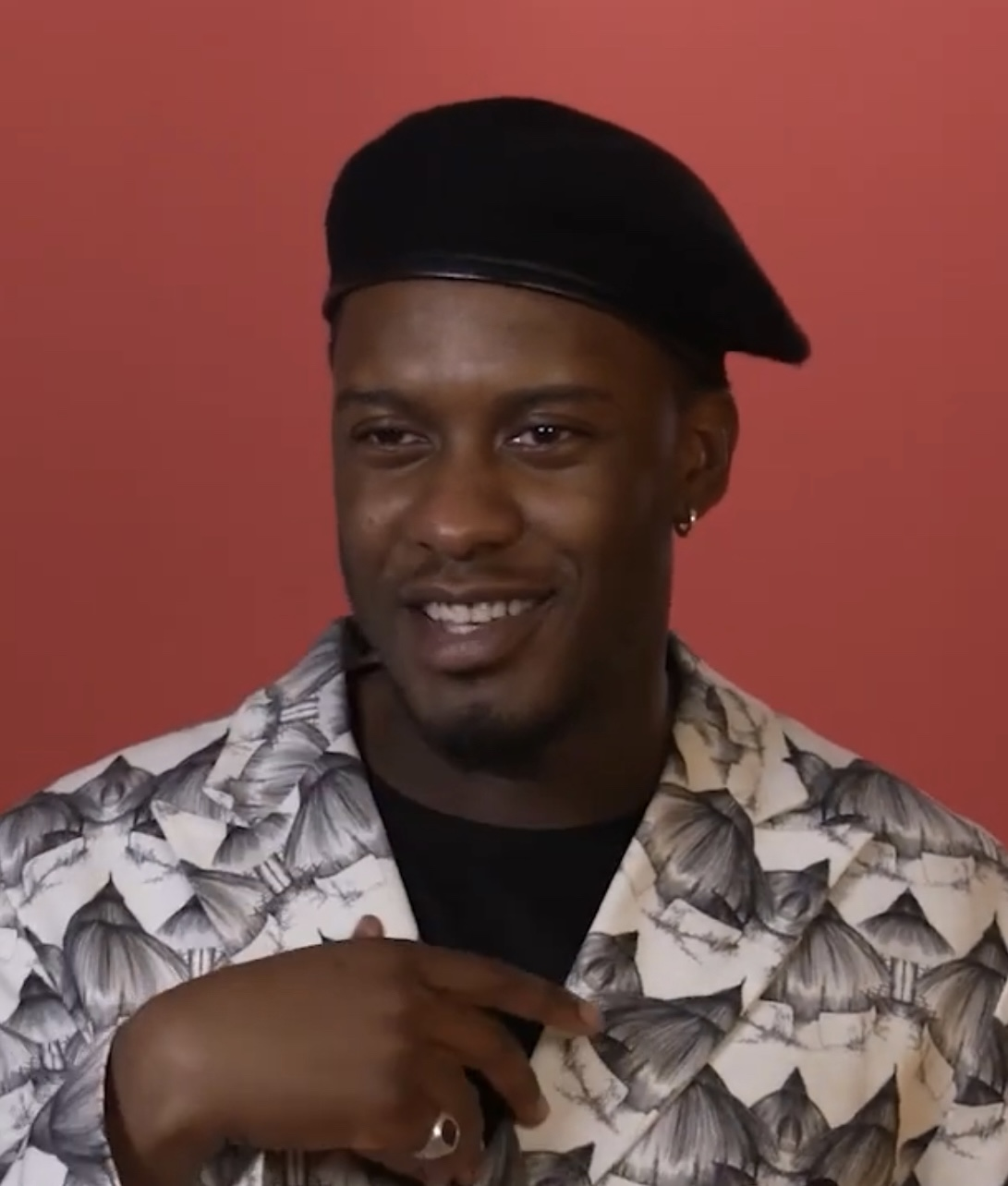
- Adewunmi at the British Independent Film Awards 2021
- Born: 1994 (age 31–32); Camden, London, England
- Other name: Sam Adewunmi
- Education: Identity School of Acting
- Occupation: Actor
- Years active: 2014–present

Samuel Adewunmi (born 1994) is an English actor. He won Most Promising Newcomer at the British Independent Film Awards as well as receiving a Best Actor nomination for his role in the film The Last Tree (2019). He was nominated for a BAFTA for his role in the BBC drama You Don't Know Me (2021).

He was named a 2019 Screen International Star of Tomorrow.

== Early life ==
Adewunmi was born in Camden, London to a single Nigerian Yoruba mother, a chef. He and his brother grew up on the Maiden Lane Estate just north of King's Cross and St Pancras stations, the same estate where Tin Luck was filmed. He first discovered drama through a school play in year three, and was eight when he put on a community play at the Camden People's Theatre. He trained at Identity School of Acting.

== Career ==
In 2016, Adewunmi played Benedict in the third series of the CBBC Online web series Dixi. He made his feature film debut as Isaac in the 2017 crime film The Hatton Garden Job and guest starred in the Doctor Who series 10 episode "The Eaters of Light"

Adewunmi led the film The Last Tree and signed with United Talent Agency (UTA) shortly after its premiere at the 2019 Sundance Film Festival. For his performance, he won Most Promising Newcomer at the British Independent Film Awards and was nominated for Best Actor. He also received two National Film Awards UK nominations. In 2020, he starred as Carcer Dun in the BBC America adaptation of Terry Pratchett's The Watch and the short film Tin Luck.

In 2021, Adewunmi starred in the ITV thriller Angela Black and led the BBC One adaptation of You Don't Know Me as Hero. For the latter, he was nominated for the British Academy Television Award for Best Actor. Adewunmi made his professional stage debut starring in the world premiere of Trouble in Butetown at the Donmar Warehouse in February 2023. He made his West End debut in A Mirror at the Trafalgar Theatre in January 2024.

== Filmography ==
=== Film ===
Year	Title	Role	Notes
2017	The Hatton Garden Job	Isaac	
2019	The Last Tree	Femi	
2019	Born a King	Marzouq	
2020	Tin Luck	Trey	Short film
2023	Oba		Short film
2023	(SPIN)	Zekiel	Short film
2024	i and i	Two	Short film
2024	Ciclos	Theo	Short film

=== Television ===
Year	Title	Role	Notes
2014	The Missing	Manager	2 episodes
2016	Dixi	Benedict	Web series; series 3 (40 episodes)
2017	Prime Suspect 1973	Billy Myers	2 episodes
2017	Doctor Who	Vitus	Episode: "The Eaters of Light"
2018	Stan Lee's Lucky Man	Kit	Episode: "The Zero Option"
2020	The Watch	Carcer Dun	Main role
2021	Angela Black	Ed Harrison / Theo Walters	Main role
2021	You Don't Know Me	Hero	Miniseries; main role
2023	Secret Invasion	Beto	Miniseries; main role
2024	Queenie	Frank Ssebendeke II	

== Awards and nominations ==
Year	Award	Category	Work	Result	Ref
2019	British Independent Film Awards	Best Performance by an Actor in a British Independent Film	The Last Tree	Nominated	
2019	British Independent Film Awards	Most Promising Newcomer	The Last Tree	Won	
2020	National Film Awards UK	Best Actor	The Last Tree	Nominated	
2020	National Film Awards UK	Best Newcomer	The Last Tree	Nominated	
2022	British Academy Television Awards	Best Actor	You Don't Know Me	Nominated	
