= I Love Luci =

2010 Scottish short film

- Film poster
- Directed by: Colin Kennedy
- Written by: Colin Kennedy
- Produced by: Brian Coffey
- Starring: Camilla Rutherford; Colin Harris
- Cinematography: Benjamin Kracun
- Edited by: Jake Roberts
- Production company: Sigma Films
- Release date: 8 October 2010 (United Kingdom)
- Running time: 12 minutes
- Country: Scotland
- Language: English
- Budget: £67,000

I Love Luci is a short film, written and directed by Colin Kennedy, and produced by Brian Coffey for Sigma Films. It was awarded the BAFTA Scotland in 2011 for Best Short Film.

== Synopsis ==
The short film I Love Luci is a story of unrequited love and a dog's potential to influence the fortunes of a could-be couple. Marjorie, after a night of partying, seems to have lost her false teeth the day before her boyfriend is set to be released from prison. When she goes out the next day to walk her dog, she encounters her friend Tommy, who causes both chaos and assistance in Marjorie's day.

== Production ==
Based upon an encounter that writer Colin Kennedy had near his office building, which also housed a heroin rehabilitation clinic, the film built upon a conversation he overheard between two addicts. Unlike others who frequented the building, this couple were both happy and endearing, qualities which sparked the idea that became the film.

Kennedy and casting director Kathleen Crawford cast established actress and model Camilla Rutherford in the lead role of Marjory and newly discovered actor Colin Harris, only six months out of drama school, in the role of the lovesick Tommy. The combination of two actors at different stages of their careers brought a sense of balance to the completed film.

== Cast ==
- Camilla Rutherford as Marjorie
- Colin Harris as Tommy
- Wilson the dog as Luci
- Martin Docherty as Scumbag
- Leo Horsfield as Sidekick
- Sanjeev Kohli as the chemist
- Jimmy Chisholm as the dentist

== Release ==
I Love Luci has been invited to attend/compete at more than 50 international film festivals around the world including Palm Springs, AFI Film Fest, São Paulo and Clermont-Ferrand.

I Love Luci had a theatrical release in Scotland and France. Worldwide rights are represented by sales agent Network Ireland Television.

=== Awards ===
2011

- BAFTA Scotland – Best Short Film
- Manhattan Short – Bronze Medal
- Prague ISFF – Audience Award
- Almeria ISFF – Audience Award, Best Screenplay
- Brussels ISFF – Special Jury Award

2010

- Clermont-Ferrand ISFF – Prix des Mediatheques
- Interfilm Berlin – Best Fiction
- Curtas Vila do Conde – Audience Award
- FatFilmFest – Best Short Film
- Bergen Youth Film Festival – Special Jury Mention
- Glasgow SFF – Special Jury Mention
- Rushes Soho Shorts – Runner-up
