= The Escape Artist (TV series) =

- First episode titlecard
- Genre: Drama
- Created by: David Wolstencroft
- Written by: David Wolstencroft
- Directed by: Brian Welsh
- Starring: David Tennant; Toby Kebbell; Sophie Okonedo; Ashley Jensen; Jeany Spark; Tony Gardner
- Composer: Nicholas Hooper
- Country of origin: United Kingdom
- Original language: English
- No. of series: 1
- No. of episodes: 3

Production
- Executive producers: David Wolstencroft; Matthew Read (BBC)
- Producers: Paul Frift; Hilary Bevan Jones
- Cinematography: David Higgs
- Editor: Jamie Pearson
- Running time: 57 minutes
- Production company: Endor Productions Ltd

Original release
- Network: BBC One
- Release: 29 October – 12 November 2013

The Escape Artist is a British drama thriller three-part series starring David Tennant.

The series was created and written by David Wolstencroft and directed by Brian Welsh. It premiered on 29 October 2013 at 9 p.m. on BBC One. The series was filmed between 24 January and 22 March 2013 at various locations in London, Hertfordshire, Surrey and Scotland. The interior court scenes were filmed on a set at Wimbledon Studios, in Colliers Wood and at Surrey County Hall in Kingston upon Thames. The exterior court scenes were filmed at Paisley Sheriff Court in Paisley. The final court scene external shots were filmed around the Edinburgh City Chambers, Parliament Square and the Royal Mile in Edinburgh. Tennant visited the Old Bailey before filming began to do research.

== Plot ==
Barrister Will Burton (David Tennant) is known for never losing a case and getting criminals out of tight legal corners. On the verge of applying for the title of Queen's Counsel, Burton agrees to defend murder suspect Liam Foyle (Toby Kebbell) of whose innocence he is in some doubt. Having examined the evidence, he recognises a loophole and Foyle is acquitted on a technicality.

Upon winning the case, Burton declines to shake Foyle's hand and in revenge for this perceived slight, Foyle begins stalking Burton's wife Kate (Ashley Jensen) and young son Jamie (Gus Barry). Foyle then reports Burton for unprofessional behaviour, seriously delaying and perhaps even preventing him from becoming a Queen's Counsel. When Burton is unable to travel with his family to their holiday home, Foyle attacks and murders Burton's wife. Burton finds her stricken body and his traumatised son hiding in a chest. When he is calling for an ambulance, the devastated Burton sees Foyle standing outside the holiday home leaving him in no doubt that Foyle is the perpetrator.

Foyle is arrested and Maggie Gardner (Sophie Okonedo), who has lived her career in Burton's shadow, takes up Foyle's defence. The prosecution team consists of two of Burton's colleagues but due to his proximity to the case, he is not allowed any contact with his colleagues. With little confidence in his colleagues, Burton carries out his own investigation. He discovers that the woman who has provided Foyle's alibi is also looking after Foyle's possessions in a storage unit. Surreptitiously, Burton alerts his colleagues to this potential evidence. After a search, police find the evidence. Later while driving back from the holiday home, Jamie finally describes his experience of the attack and mentions that he scratched the perpetrator. This leads to the discovery of DNA evidence.

Foyle becomes enraged at his own legal team but Gardner assures him that there are only 3 pieces of evidence that connect him to the crime: the evidence from the storage unit, Burton's eye witness testimony and the DNA evidence. She says each can be easily discredited. Gardner learns that her boyfriend oversees the lab testing the DNA evidence and manages to use information he provided to discredit him and the evidence. Gardner points out to the judge that the evidence found at the storage unit was discovered from a different unit to the one on the warrant and the judge is forced to throw it out. With only Burton's eye witness testimony remaining, Gardner manages to have the case tossed for a lack of evidence and the judge directs a verdict of not guilty.

Gardner becomes increasingly concerned when Foyle begins stalking her.

Burton follows Foyle to Scotland, confronts him and tries to trick Foyle into confessing to the murder while he records him. Foyle sees through this and a scuffle breaks out which sees Burton slash with a knife at Foyle. Foyle laughs it off but then succumbs to anaphylactic shock. Burton, seemingly repentant, calls an ambulance and administers an epipen. Despite this, Foyle dies and Burton is arrested. Facing nine years’ imprisonment, he decides to represent himself in court.

Throughout the trial, Burton manages to outwit the prosecution. He points out the chance meeting and shows the jury how he tried to save Foyle. When the jury head for deliberation, Gardner approaches him. She postulates how Burton could have committed the perfect murder. She identifies how he could have identified Foyle's allergy and how he could have interfered with Foyle's epipen. She finishes by asking Burton if he's not worried about Foyle being exhumed later for further medical tests. Burton acts aloof and maintains his innocence before pointing out that Foyle was cremated. The jury comes back with a verdict of not proven and Burton is released.

== Cast ==
- David Tennant as Will Burton
- Sophie Okonedo as Maggie Gardner
- Toby Kebbell as Liam Foyle
- Ashley Jensen as Kate Burton
- Gus Barry as Jamie Burton
- Alistair Petrie as Julian Fowkes QC
- Kate Dickie as Jenny Sinclair
- Roy Marsden as Peter Simkins
- Patrick Ryecart as Gavin de Souza QC
- Jeany Spark as Tara Corbin
- Monica Dolan as Eileen Morris
- Stephen Wight as Danny Monk
- Tony Gardner as Trever Harris
- Anton Lesser as Richard Mayfield QC
- Bríd Brennan as Mary Byrne

== Episodes ==
No.	Title	Directed by	Written by	Original release date	Viewers (millions)
1	"Episode 1"	Brian Welsh	David Wolstencroft	29 October 2013	6.19
Will Burton is a talented barrister, known for winning defence cases against all the odds. After he secures the acquittal of Liam Foyle but declines to shake hands with him, Foyle seeks revenge.
2	"Episode 2"	Brian Welsh	David Wolstencroft	5 November 2013	5.32
Liam Foyle is on trial for the murder of Burton's wife, this time defended by Will's long time nemesis - Maggie Gardner.
3	"Episode 3"	Brian Welsh	David Wolstencroft	12 November 2013	5.64
Will takes the law into his own hands after the case against Foyle collapses.

== Reception ==
The series received positive reviews. Review aggregator Rotten Tomatoes gave the series an 85% 'fresh' rating based on 13 critic reviews. The critical consensus reads "Its deliberate pace demands patience, but The Escape Artist benefits from David Tennant's performance, as well as an emotionally engaging, socially conscious storyline." Metacritic gave it a score of 71 out of 100 based on 12 critics, indicating 'generally favorable reviews.'

== Nominations ==
- 2014 – Seoul International Drama Awards: Best Series Drama
- 2014 British Academy Scotland Awards - Best Actor in Television: David Tennant

== Worldwide release ==
Country	Network	Premiere date
Germany	VOX	15 March 2014
