= The Entire History of You =

- Black Mirror episode
- Liam Foxwell (Toby Kebbell) performs a re-do of a memory by scrolling through his grain.
- Episode no.: Series 1 Episode 3
- Directed by: Brian Welsh
- Written by: Jesse Armstrong
- Cinematography by: Zac Nicholson
- Editing by: Alastair Reid
- Original air date: 18 December 2011
- Running time: 44 minutes

Guest appearances
- Toby Kebbell as Liam Foxwell; Jodie Whittaker as Ffion Foxwell; Tom Cullen as Jonas; Jimi Mistry as Paul; Amy Beth Hayes as Lucy; Rebekah Staton as Colleen; Rhashan Stone as Jeff; Phoebe Fox as Hallam; Daniel Lapaine as Max; Karl Collins as Robbie

Episode chronology
← Previous "Fifteen Million Merits"	Next → "Be Right Back"

"The Entire History of You" is the third and final episode of the first series of the British dystopian fiction anthology television series Black Mirror. It is the only episode not written or co-written by series creator Charlie Brooker, instead credited to sitcom writer Jesse Armstrong. Directed by Brian Welsh, the episode premiered on Channel 4 on 18 December 2011.

The episode is set in a future where a "grain" technology records people's audiovisual senses, allowing a person to re-watch their memories. The lawyer Liam (Toby Kebbell) attends a dinner party with his wife Ffion (Jodie Whittaker), becoming suspicious after seeing her zealously interact with a friend of hers, Jonas (Tom Cullen). This leads him to scrutinise his memories and Ffion's claims about the nature of her relationship with Jonas. The episode was designed to be set in 2050, with stone, wood and metal materials featuring heavily in the sets. The concept of an episode about relationships and the importance of letting things go was pitched by Armstrong.

The episode was less comedic than other works by Armstrong, with critics highlighting its relevance to how mobile phones and the internet allow people to record an increasing number of details about their lives. Reception to the episode at the time of its broadcast was positive towards its premise and Kebbell's acting, with mixed reception to its execution. Later critics generally ranked "The Entire History of You" among the best instalments of Black Mirror.

== Plot ==
Litigation lawyer Liam Foxwell attends a performance appraisal. Agonising over it, he repeatedly watches the "re-do" on his "grain", an implant which records footage from a person's eyes and ears. Arriving at a dinner party for his wife Ffion and her friends, he finds Ffion laughing with Jonas. Throughout dinner, Liam scrutinises Ffion's reactions to Jonas, whose engagement recently ended. Jonas jokes about a time when his fiancée was waiting for him in bed while he was downstairs masturbating to a re-do of him having sex with a different woman. The other guests react negatively at this joke. Another guest, Hallam (Phoebe Fox), talks about how she lacks a grain after being "gouged"—an attacker cut into the skin behind her right ear to steal her memories. Improper removal of the grain can blind the victim.

Liam invites Jonas to his and Ffion's house, but then exaggeratedly remembers how late it is and Jonas leaves. Ffion invites the babysitter Gina (Mona Goodwin), who was looking after their daughter Jody, to sleep upstairs. Liam asks Ffion about Jonas, and she identifies him as a brief paramour from Marrakesh. She says they dated for a month, but Liam shows a memory of her saying that she dated "Mr. Marrakesh" for a week. The discussion becomes heated, Ffion referencing Liam's former obsession over another man Dan, and Liam calling Ffion a bitch. They reconcile and have sex while watching memories of their past sexual encounters. Afterwards, Liam goes downstairs and drinks copiously while watching re-dos of the dinner party.

When Gina awakens, Liam asks for her opinion on the memories. Embarrassed, Ffion gets Gina to leave. Liam interrogates Ffion further. She now says that her relationship with Jonas lasted six months. Liam drives to Jonas's house—ignoring his car's warnings that drunkenness invalidates his insurance. Jonas is unhappy to see him. They both enter the living room along with Hallam, who apparently spent the night with him, which Liam scoffs about. Liam begins to drink more while asking Jonas passive aggressive questions like if the lamp in the room is from Marrakesh, if he had sex with Hallam to later watch as re-dos, and if he masturbates to pictures of Ffion in the room, all while playing it off as just a joke. Jonas continuously tells Liam to leave, which he ignores. This escalates into a fight between the two.

Liam wakes in his car, which crashed into a tree, and replays his memories. Assaulting Jonas, he made him delete his recorded memories of Ffion. While this happened, Hallam called the police. Liam spots Ffion’s memory of Jonas in his bed. He asks Ffion about it. She lies at every step until Liam presses further: after Liam left home over an argument about Dan, Ffion had drunken sex with Jonas around the time Jody was conceived. Aggressively, Liam demands she play the memory, and she does.

Later, in an empty house, Liam re-watches memories of Ffion and Jody. He uses a razor blade and tweezers to remove his grain, and the screen cuts to black as he pulls it out.

== Production ==
The executive producers Charlie Brooker and Annabel Jones began work on Black Mirror in 2010, having previously worked together on other television programmes. The programme was commissioned for three hour-long episodes by Channel 4, taking its budget from the comedy department. Brooker's production company Zeppotron produced the show for Endemol. "The Entire History of You" was the third episode to air, on 18 December 2011.

=== Conception and writing ===
"The Entire History of You" was written by Jesse Armstrong, making it the only episode to not give a writing credit to creator and showrunner Charlie Brooker. Executive producer Annabel Jones said that they were looking for a satirical writer whose stories "still have meat". Armstrong was a sitcom writer, best known for co-creating Peep Show, which uses point-of-view shots, and had met Brooker several times previously. Armstrong had independently been considering the exponential growth of memory capacity in computers, and pitched an idea relating to the importance of "being able to forget things" in relationships. The episode's first draft was too long; Brooker conceived of several consequences of the grain such as people going to the cinema to have affairs as their grains would be turned off for copyright law reasons. The story was scaled down to focus on a "domestic bubble".

=== Casting and filming ===
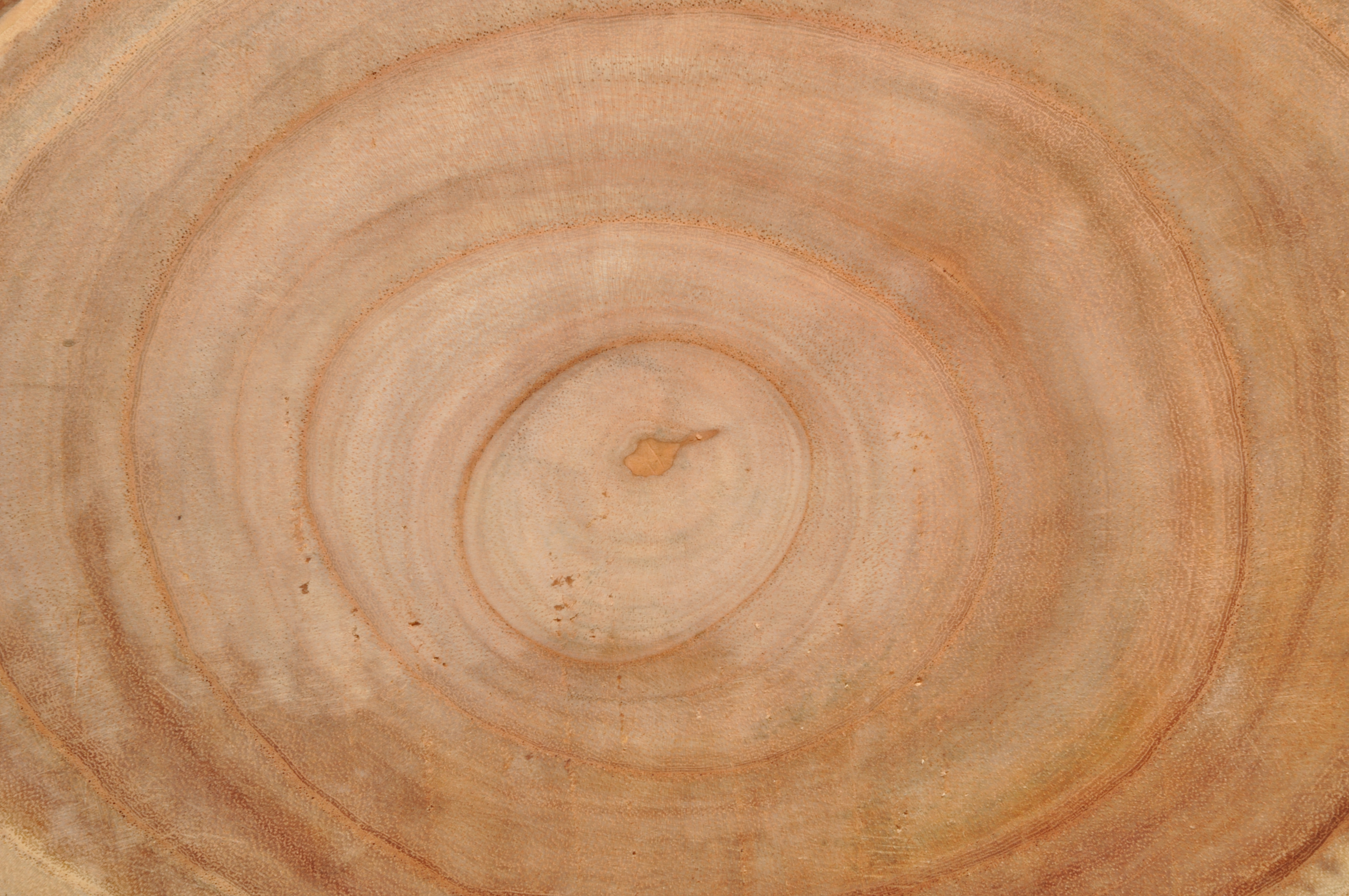
The grain's interface for accessing memories was designed to resemble tree rings.

Brian Welsh was hired as director, based on the recommendation of producer Barney Reisz. Welsh had little industry experience; he focused on Toby's performance and the exploration of jealousy. Scenes were filmed with different intonations and improvisation. Toby Kebbell stars as Liam Foxwell, while Jodie Whittaker was cast as his wife Ffion. She was hired immediately following her audition. Casting director Shaheen Baig commented that the pair are similar actors, as both are "very emotionally open" but "subtle and complex". Between takes, Kebbell would remain focused and the two were given notes privately by Welsh, so they each did not know how the other was going to act.

The memory technology is known as a grain as it is the size of a grain of rice. The characters control it with a small circular remote that the crew called a "pebble". Production designer Joel Collins designed the grain app to resemble tree rings. To distance the episode from science fiction, Collins used materials like stone, wood and metal. The episode is set in 2050 and has a "mid-century" feel based on 1950. It uses point-of-view shots to show the characters' memories.

The sex scene between Liam and Ffion was originally conceived as the characters having sex while watching an earlier sexual encounter on the bedroom television. Due to logistical difficulties, the characters instead watch the footage replayed in their pupils, which have the visual effect of being "milked out". Brooker describes the scene as feeling "downright haunting", whereas the first incarnation was "amusing and a bit sad".

During post-production, the creators grew concerned that a certain combination of takes led Liam to be deemed unlikable. Subsequently, the final edit was altered to focus on a side of Liam that was considered funnier.

=== Film optioning ===
When Armstrong made a deal to write the episode, he asked to reserve film rights for the idea. In February 2013, it was reported that the American actors Robert Downey Jr. and George Clooney had bid for the rights to option "The Entire History of You" with the intention of making a film adaptation. The rights went to Downey Jr.'s production company Team Downey. Armstrong planned to write the script, which would be about a man who uses a grain to repeat memories with his deceased wife, gradually learning a big secret from doing so. In a 2018 interview with Yahoo! Movies, Armstrong reported that the project was in "development hell", commenting that no progress was being made but that he was still interested in the project. He suggested that Team Downey's option had lapsed.

== Analysis ==
Though Armstrong was known as a comedy writer, the episode contains little humour. In comparison to the previous episodes, "The National Anthem" and "Fifteen Million Merits", David Sims of The A.V. Club found it made for more uncomfortable viewing and Sam Richards of The Telegraph found it to contain less satire. Al Horner of GQ called it the "most emotionally harrowing" episode, Brendan Doyle of Comingsoon.net writing that although the episode is "exceptionally dark", it ends with "a small ray of hope". Sims summarised the episode as a "spare, intimate affair centered around three characters and an accusation of infidelity".

=== Setting and design ===
The episode takes place in the near future, the primary setting being "stark, modernist interiors of several isolated country homes" according to Emily Yoshida of Grantland. Shelli Nicole of Architectural Digest analysed that the "cool jewel" colours in Liam and Ffion's house relate to their mistrust and detachment. Reflective surfaces are prominent, including a mirrored coffee table, which allows the couple to look at themselves rather than each other.

Sims analysed that the episode's exposition is gradual. The primary difference between the fictional setting and the modern world is the grain technology depicted. Facilitating the replaying of memories, the grain allows zooming in, speed alteration and lip reading analysis of a user's memories. When a person is using their grain, their eyes look different: Brooker described them as "milked out". Sims commented that a user's "eyes glow dully", which creates "a demonic look". Yoshida compared the technology to Google Glass, a pair of glasses with a computer display. The episode shows varied uses for the grain, such as screening at airport security or re-watching a baby's audiovisual feed to ensure the babysitter did their job. Sims found that it is "easy to imagine" an uptake in such technology in the future.

=== Themes ===
Critics found that the episode relates to technologies such as mobile phones and the internet which allow detailed recording of aspects of a person's life. Yoshida believed that it would seem "unnatural, even revolting" to a person from a past era that modern day people can "recall emotional triggers with the clarity we are capable of." Richards found that the grain technology could be good for reminiscing on old memories, but leads to increased arguments in relationships. Lambie suggested that imperfect memories can be desirable. Yoshida commented that there is a "complete absence of film, television, and music" as a consequence of the grain. The scene in which Ffion and Liam have sex while watching themselves having sex previously was found to be "joyless" and "devastating" by Yoshida and Sims, respectively. Lambie questioned the data privacy implications of the grain: "If citizens have no privacy over the memories, what does this mean for criminals?"

Comparisons were made to other media. Sims linked its themes to the 1869 novel He Knew He Was Right, about a marriage failing from the jealousy of the husband and stubbornness of the wife. Richard Edwards of GamesRadar+ compared its subject matter to the 1974 thriller The Conversation, about a moral dilemma faced by a man involved in surveillance, further commenting that the director's use of still cameras and lengthy takes resemble 1970s thrillers.

=== Characterisation ===
Ryan Lambie of Den of Geek commented that the characters are all rich, young and attractive. Adam David of CNN Philippines found that the episode suggests that small lies and unreliable memories are "part of being human". Brooker commented that he has seen a "reductive" interpretation of the story as one where "poor Liam ... found out that his wife was a bitch", which he disagreed with. However, the writers and executive producers sympathised with Liam to a limited extent. Armstrong found that the grain enabled Liam's pre-existing jealousy. Brooker believed that Liam is a "weak, frightened, flawed person" and "a bit of a bully" towards Ffion, his issues stemming from insecurity. Jones thought Liam was "obviously obsessive" but gained "slight redemption" in removing his grain.

Travis Clark of Business Insider believed that Jonas was the father of Ffion's child. However, Brooker said that the ending was intended to indicate that Ffion had left Liam with their child, whose biological father was Liam, not Jonas. Brooker commented that if there is a moral, it is that Liam "shouldn't have gone looking for something that was only going to upset him".

== Reception ==
=== Critical reception ===
On the review aggregator website Rotten Tomatoes, the episode holds an approval rating of 89% based on 18 reviews, with an average rating of 7.00/10. The website's critics consensus reads: "Examining how technology amplifies human characteristics, the emotional punch of 'The Entire History of You' comes from positing that we don't need futuristic technology to ruin a relationship – we can do it all by ourselves." It received ratings of an A− in The A.V. Club and three stars in The Telegraph and GamesRadar+. The episode was praised by Yoshida as "emotionally immediate and prescient".

Sims praised that he felt a "dark shiver of recognition" at Liam's actions. However, he believed that Liam's paranoia, alcohol intake and violence escalates too fast. Edwards criticised that he found almost every character very unlikable.

Ideas from the episode were praised, but some critics found the execution lacking. Sims and Edwards found the premise of grain technology believable. Stephen Carty of The Guardian reviewed that the episode was "grounded in reality", making it relatable despite a "fantastical premise". Richards critiqued that the grain "wasn't so crucial to the trajectory of the story" as "jealous people will always find ways to destroy their relationships". Edwards found that the execution of the episode "completely fails to explore the technology's dramatic potential"; however, James Hibberd of Entertainment Weekly thought the execution was "sophisticated and flawless". While Lambie suggested that the episode would have benefited from being longer, Edwards believed it should have had a more nonlinear narrative. He also suggested focusing on a different aspect of the conceit, such as the unreliability of natural memories or the potential for crime investigators to recover memories directly from a person's brain. Aubrey Page of Collider praised that the ending, despite being predictable, was "handled with such visual aplomb".

=== Black Mirror episode rankings ===
"The Entire History of You" often ranks very highly on critics' lists of best episodes. The following critics compared the 23 instalments of Black Mirror, from best to worst:

- 1st – Matt Donnelly and Tim Molloy, TheWrap
- 1st – James Hibberd, Entertainment Weekly
- 1st – Morgan Jeffery, Digital Spy
- 2nd (of the Top Ten) – Gina Carbone, CinemaBlend
- 2nd – Aubrey Page, Collider

- 2nd – Ed Power, The Telegraph
- 4th – Travis Clark, Business Insider
- 5th – Charles Bramesco, Vulture
- 6th – Corey Atad, Esquire
- 7th (of the Top Seven) – Al Horner, GQ

Meanwhile, Brian Tallerico of Vulture rated Kebbell's performance the third best of Black Mirror, praising him for a "heartbreaking" performance as "a man whose world collapses around him and who gets to watch it fall again and again and again."

Other critics ranked the 13 episodes in Black Mirror's first three series:

- 3rd – Andrew Wallenstein, Variety
- 4th – Mat Elfring, GameSpot
- 5th – Adam David, CNN Philippines
- 6th (of the Top Ten) – Brendan Doyle, Comingsoon.net
- 7th – Jacob Hall, /Film

== See also ==
- Borg – Fictional faction in Star Trek
- Microsoft Recall – AI-powered feature of Windows 11
- Neuralink – American neurotechnology company
- Sword Art Online – Japanese light novel series and its adaptations
- The Final Cut
- They Live – 1988 film by John Carpenter
- White Christmas
