= Beats (2019 British film) =

2019 Scottish film by Brian Welsh

- Theatrical release poster
- Directed by: Brian Welsh
- Screenplay by: Kieran Hurley; Brian Welsh
- Based on: Beats by Kieran Hurley
- Produced by: Camilla Bray
- Starring: Laura Fraser; Lorn Macdonald; Cristian Ortega
- Cinematography: Benjamin Kračun
- Edited by: Robin Hill
- Music by: Stephen Hindman; Penelope Trappes
- Production company: BFI
- Distributed by: Altitude Film Distribution
- Release dates: 24 January 2019 (IFFR); 17 May 2019 (United Kingdom); 26 June 2020 (United States)
- Running time: 96 minutes
- Country: United Kingdom
- Language: English
- Budget: > £25,000
- Box office: $325,493

Beats is a 2019 British black-and-white drama film directed by Brian Welsh. It was based upon a play of the same name by Kieran Hurley, who adapted the screenplay with Welsh; Steven Soderbergh acts as an executive producer. The plot follows a pair of teenage friends in 1994 Scotland who try and sneak into an illegal rave party. The film was released in the United Kingdom on 17 May 2019.

== Premise ==
The film is set in 1994 in Livingston, Scotland, against the backdrop of the Criminal Justice and Public Order Act 1994, which effectively banned outdoor rave parties across the whole of the UK. Best friends Johnno and Spanner are going to a rave for the first, and perhaps last time together.

== Cast ==
- Cristian Ortega as Johnno McCreadie
- Lorn Macdonald as Robert "Spanner" Smith
- Laura Fraser as Alison McCreadie
- Brian Ferguson as Robert Dunlop
- Ross Mann as Derek a.k.a. "D-Man"
- Gemma McElhinney as Laura
- Amy Manson as Cat
- Rachel Jackson as Wendy Smith
- Neil Leiper as "Fido" Smith
- Kevin Mains as Les

== Production ==
Brian Welsh first came into contact with Steven Soderbergh around 2015, after Soderbergh had seen an episode of Black Mirror that Welsh had directed and approached him with a new project. While Welsh turned that down, he showed his Beats script to Soderbergh, who then signed on as an executive producer on the film. For the climactic rave sequence, filming took place in a warehouse in the Glasgow city centre, using over 1,500 background actors. The film's soundtrack was curated by JD Twitch of Optimo.

== Release ==
Beats had its international debut at the 2019 International Film Festival Rotterdam. On 17 May 2019 it was released in the United Kingdom and the Republic of Ireland, and on 7 November 2019 in the Netherlands.

== Reception ==
On review aggregator website Rotten Tomatoes, the film holds an approval rating of 98% based on 62 reviews, with an average of 7.7/10. The site's critics consensus reads: "Well-acted and enlivened by an evocative soundtrack and period detail, Beats draws timeless themes out of its specific story and setting." At Metacritic, the film has a weighted average score of 74 out of 100, based on 14 critics, indicating "generally favorable reviews".

Wendy Ide of The Guardian gave the film 4/5 stars, writing: "It's a terrific little film that combines the earthy humour and honesty of a Shane Meadows movie with an unexpected expressionistic section – flooded with colour – that channels the boys' joyful dancefloor abandon." In a separate Guardian review, Mike McCahill gave it three stars, saying that "this teen bromance eventually escapes into amiable nostalgia and artful euphoria".

Lorn Macdonald won Best Actor in Film BAFTA Scotland for his performance as Spanner.
