= 2014 British Academy Scotland Awards =

Scottish film and television awards

- Date: 16 November 2014
- Site: Radisson Blu Hotel, Glasgow, Scotland
- Hosted by: Hazel Irvine

Television coverage
- Network: Streaming webcast

The 24th British Academy Scotland Awards were held on 16 November 2014 at the Radisson Blu Hotel in Glasgow, honouring the best Scottish film and television productions of 2013. Presented by BAFTA Scotland, accolades are handed out for the best in feature-length film that were screened at British cinemas during 2013. The Nominees were announced on 23 October 2014. The ceremony was broadcast online via YouTube and was hosted by Hazel Irvine.

Tommy Gormley, Alex Graham and Lorraine Kelly were honoured with Outstanding Contribution awards at this ceremony.

== Winners and nominees ==
Winners are listed first and highlighted in boldface.

Best Feature Film	Best Director Film/Television
**Starred Up**: Sunshine on Leith; Filth	**David Mackenzie – Starred Up**: Jon S Baird – Filth; Dexter Fletcher – Sunshine on Leith
Best Actor in Film	Best Actress in Film
**James McAvoy – Filth as Bruce Robertson**: Peter Mullan – Sunshine on Leith as Robert Henshaw; Jack O'Connell – Starred Up as Eric Love	**Sophie Kennedy Clark – Philomena as Young Philomena**: Freya Mavor – Sunshine on Leith as Liz Henshaw; Jane Horrocks – Sunshine on Leith as Jean Henshaw
Best Actor in Television	Best Actress in Television
**David Tennant – The Escape Artist as Will Burton**: Douglas Henshall – Shetland as Jimmy Perez; Mark Bonnar – Line Of Duty as Mike Dryden	**Shirley Henderson – Southcliffe as Claire Salter**: Laurie Brett – Waterloo Road as Christine Mulgrew; Sharon Rooney – My Mad Fat Diary as Rachel 'Rae' Earl
Best Writer Film/Television	Best Comedy/Entertainment Programme
**Jonathan Asser – Starred Up**: Brian Limond – Limmy’s Show! Christmas Special!; David Wolstencroft – The Escape Artist	**Miller's Mountain – (BBC Scotland)**: Limmy's Show – (The Comedy Unit); Mrs Brown's Boys – (BBC Scotland)
Best Factual Series	Best Features/ Factual Entertainment Programme
**Britain's Whale Hunters: The Untold Story – BBC Four**: Clydebuilt: The Ships That Made the Commonwealth – (BBC Scotland); The Story of Women and Art – BBC Two	**Dream Me Up Scotty – (BBC Scotland)**: I Belong to Glasgow – (BBC Scotland); Location Location Location – (BBC Scotland)
Best Single Documentary	Best Short Film
**Keys To The Castle** – **(BBC Scotland)**: From Scotland With Love – (BBC Two Scotland); The Girl Who Talked to Dolphins – (BBC Scotland)	**Getting On** – Foundling Films: Colours – Screen Productions; Exchange And Mart – Hopscotch Films
Best Current Affairs	Best Children's Programme
**Dave: Loan Ranger** – **Channel 4**: Blethering Referendum – BBC One Scotland; Panorama: All In A Good Cause – BBC One	**Katie Morag** – (CBeebies): All Over The Place Australia – (BBC Scotland); The Dog Ate My Homework – (BBC Scotland)
Best Game	Best Animation
**Grand Theft Auto V** – **Rockstar Games**: Monster Legacy – Outplay Entertainment; Solar Flux HD – Firebrand Games	**Monkey Love Experiments** – **Will Anderson, Ainslie Henderson, Cameron Fraser**: Sea Front – Claire Lamond; Spectators – Ross Hogg

=== Outstanding Contribution to Television ===
- **Lorraine Kelly**

=== Outstanding Contribution to Craft ===
- Tommy Gormley

=== Outstanding Contribution to Broadcasting ===
- **Alex Graham**

== See also ==
- BAFTA Scotland
- 67th British Academy Film Awards
- 86th Academy Awards
- 20th Screen Actors Guild Awards
- 34th Golden Raspberry Awards
