= Georgia Christou =

English playwright, screenwriter and producer

- Born: July 1987 (age 39); Brighton, England
- Education: Royal Central School of Speech and Drama
- Years active: 2012–present

Georgia Christou (born July 1987) is an English playwright, screenwriter and producer. She has received a number of accolades, including British Academy Television Award and Ray Bradbury Award nominations.

== Early life ==
Christou is from Brighton. She was interested in acting growing up and joined the National Youth Theatre (NYT) at age 15. She went on to graduate from with a Bachelor of Arts (BA) in Acting from the Royal Central School of Speech and Drama in 2008. In 2012 at the recommendation of a friend, Christou took the Lyric Theatre Hammersmith's Young Writers course, where she penned her first play Yous Two.

== Career ==
=== Theatre ===
Christou was selected for the 2014 HighTide Festival's Escalator Plays programme and wrote the short play How Not to Sink for the 2016 Women Centre Stage Festival at the Hampstead Theatre.

Christou's first full play Yous Two was shortlisted for the 2015 Verity Bargate Award and received commendations. The play officially premiered at the Hampstead Theatre in 2018. This premiere production was directed by Chelsea Walker and starred Shannon Tarbet. For Yous Two, Christou was nominated for Best Writer at The Stage Debut Awards that year.

Also in 2018, Christou's children's play How to Spot an Alien, co-produced by Paines Plough, premiered at the Theatr Clwyd that summer. It was also showcased at the Edinburgh Fringe Festival.

In 2019, Christou co-created a stage adaptation of Peter Pan with Liam Steel, which moves the setting to a council estate in 21st-century Birmingham. Peter Pan: Reimagined premiered at Birmingham Repertory Theatre that December. The production's ensemble cast included Lawrence Walker, Nia Gwynne and Rose Ayling-Ellis.

For Tonic Theatre's The Platform project, which commissions plays with substantial roles for young women and girls, Christou contributed a play titled Bright. Young. Things. She wrote it for a cast of young performers. Bright. Young. Things was workshopped by Chichester Festival Youth Theatre and published in 2020 via Nick Hern Books.

In addition, Christou has been a visiting lecturer in playwriting at her alma mater the Royal Central School of Speech and Drama.

=== Screen ===
Through the Channel 4 initiative 4Stories, Christou made her screenwriting debut with "Through the Gates", an installment of the 2018 anthology On the Edge. Jasper Rees of The Arts Desk praised Christou's "sleekly plotted writing", which "slalomed with great economy and skill between comedy and commentary, between searing heartache and a final uplifting tableau". The installment was directed by Stella Corradi and starred Wunmi Mosaku and Ria Zmitrowicz. For her work, Christou was nominated for Best Breakthrough Talent at the 2019 British Academy Television Craft Awards. "Through the Gates" was also nominated for the Best Single Drama.

Returning to television in 2024, Christou served as a consulting producer on Charlie Covell's Netflix series Kaos and wrote episode 6. For their work on Kaos, Christou and Covell were jointly nominated for Ray Bradbury Award. She joined the writing room of Paris Lees' What It Feels Like for a Girl for BBC Three and contributed to the writing of two episodes. Christou also wrote episodes of Sally Wainwright's Disney+ series Renegade Nell, with Rory Doherty of Paste calling her and Emme Hoy's episodes "sharp", and the second season of the Apple TV+ series The Buccaneers.

== Credits ==
=== Plays ===
- Yous Two
- How to Spot an Alien
- How Not to Sink
- Peter Pan: Reimagined, with Liam Steel
- Bright. Young. Things

=== Television ===
Year	Title	Notes
2018	On the Edge	Anthology: "Through the Gates"
2024	Renegade Nell	Episode: "Stop Printing This Muck"
2024	Kaos	Episode 6
2025	The Buccaneers	Episode: "Ice Cream"
2025	What It Feels Like for a Girl	2 episodes
2026	Two Weeks in August	Episode 5

== Accolades ==
Year	Award	Category	Title	Result	Ref.
2015	Verity Bargate Award		Yous Two	Commended	
2018	The Stage Debut Awards	Best Writer	Yous Two	Nominated	
2019	British Academy Television Craft Awards	Best Breakthrough Talent	On the Edge: "Through the Gates"	Nominated	
2019	British Academy Television Awards	Best Single Drama	On the Edge: "Through the Gates"	Nominated	
2025	Ray Bradbury Award		Kaos	Nominated	(Note: Shared with Charlie Covell)
