= What It Feels Like for a Girl (TV series) =

2025 British TV series

- Genre: Coming of age; Teen drama
- Created by: Paris Lees
- Based on: What It Feels Like for a Girl by Paris Lees
- Directed by: Brian Welsh; Ng Choon Ping; Marie Kristiansen
- Starring: Ellis Howard; Laura Haddock; Hannah Walters; Michael Socha; Laquarn Lewis; Hannah Jones; Adam Ali; Alex Thomas-Smith; Calam Lynch; Jake Dunn; Dickie Beau; Emma Shipp; Laura Checkley
- Composer: James Jacob
- Country of origin: United Kingdom
- Original language: English
- No. of episodes: 8

Production
- Executive producers: Paris Lees; Brian Welsh; Liza Marshall; Ron O'Berst; Nawfal Faizullah
- Producer: Frances du Pille
- Production location: United Kingdom
- Cinematography: Si Bell; Kate Reid; Neus Ollé
- Editors: Fiona DeSouza; Julian Ulrichs; Sam White
- Running time: 44 minutes
- Production companies: Hera Pictures; ITV Studios

Original release
- Network: BBC Three
- Release: 3 June 2025

What It Feels Like for a Girl is a British coming of age television series that is adapted by Paris Lees from her memoir of the same name. The series premiered on 3 June 2025 on BBC Three. It received five nominations at the 2026 TV BAFTAs, including Best Limited Drama, Leading Actor for Ellis Howard and Best Writer, Drama for Paris Lees.

== Cast and characters ==
=== Main ===
- Ellis Howard as Byron/Paris
- Laura Haddock as Lisa
- Hannah Walters as Mommar Joe
- Michael Socha as Steve
- Laquarn Lewis as Lady Die
- Hannah Jones as Sasha
- Adam Ali as Dirty Damian
- Alex Thomas-Smith as Sticky Nikki
- Calam Lynch as Max
- Jake Dunn as Liam
- Dickie Beau as Peter
- Emma Shipp as Smanfa
- Laura Checkley as Bev

=== Guest ===
- Oliver Huntingdon as Bradley
- Sekou Diaby as Rinze
- Rhys Connah as Carl
- Fay Ripley as Tessa
- Selina Mosinski as Mikey
- Juliet Cowan as Alison
- Lorn Macdonald as Tony
- Emma Naomi as Miss Meadows
- Conor Deane as Wayne

== Production ==
=== Development ===
In June 2023, it was announced BBC Three had commissioned an 8-episode adaptation of Paris Lees' coming-of-age memoir What It Feels Like for a Girl, produced by Hera Pictures and penned by Lees herself. Chris Sweeney was originally attached as lead director, but the position later went to Brian Welsh. Lees was joined in the writing room by Georgia Christou, Paul Williams, Sarah Simmonds and Mika Onyx Johnson, while Ng Choon Ping and Marie Kristiansen supported Welsh as directors.

=== Casting ===
The cast was revealed in March 2025, with Ellis Howard set to lead the series. Lees said "The biggest challenge was always the lead role – we're following someone who’s going from, in the eyes of the outside world, a schoolboy, right up to a trans woman starting university, and all that's in between. The moment I saw Ellis, I recognised something in him - a cheekiness, a delicateness, a complexity - and knew he was the one". Also announced were Laura Haddock, Hannah Walters and Michael Socha as well as Laquarn Lewis, Hannah Jones, Adam Ali, Alex Thomas-Smith, Calam Lynch, Jake Dunn and Dickie Beau. Further cast members included Emma Shipp, Sekou Diaby, Laura Checkley, Oliver Huntingdon, Lorn Macdonald and Rhys Connah. Fay Ripley and Selina Mosinski would make guest appearances.

=== Filming ===
Principal photography took place in Nottingham and South Wales.

== Episodes ==
No.	Title	Directed by	Written by	Original release date
1	"Episode 1"	Brian Welsh	Paris Lees	3 June 2025
Byron is a 15 year old British teenager from a small town, Hucknall. They suffer from bullies and live with their father Steve who resents them for being too effeminate. Byron has only one friend, Samantha. After being assaulted by hooligans en route home from school, they discard their bloodied clothes to hide the incident from Steve. Byron later goes for a walk and inside a public lavatory, comes across a man masturbating in their presence. Byron hides in one of the stalls, but the man offers them money for a handjob. Byron starts cottaging for money. When they tell Samantha about it, she is concerned, but Byron continues. After one of the encounters, two men confront them about having sex for money and offer to introduce them to a client. At their request, Byron goes to one of the toilets and meets Max, a 19 year old man with frosted tips. They spend the night having a threesome with the client, but in the morning Byron and Max wake up alone and have sex together. They are infatuated with each other and start dating. Byron asks Max to bring them to a night club, and they agree to meet at the bus station on Friday. At home, Steven tells Byron that he found the shirt and scolds them for not fighting back. Byron goes to stay at his mother's house. On Friday, Max does not show up, and Byron goes home; they are assaulted on their way back. Steven yells at Byron again and Byron leaves home to go clubbing where they meet Die, a trans go go dancer. Byron also sees Max, but he runs away from them.
2	"Episode 2"	Brian Welsh	Paris Lees & Georgia Christou	3 June 2025
Die introduces Byron to her friends, the Fallen Divas: drug dealer Dirty Damien, trans woman Sticky Nikki, middle-aged man Peter and Sasha a white trans woman with big breast implants; they tell Byron to get over Max. Later, the group visits a fast food restaurant where Byron meets one of the pimps who turns out to be Liam, Sasha's chav boyfriend; afterwards they go to a party at Peter's. Sasha shares pills that she stole from one of the men she made out with; Byron joins them. Byron has a flashback to when their mother left and moved to Turkey, leaving them in custody of their father, who became abusive due to Byron expressing that they do not feel like a boy. The next day, Byron takes the Divas to Newstead Abbey. Afterwards, the Divas persuade Byron to take them to their dad's, but when Steven shows up early, he is friendly with them. Byron meets Steven's new girlfriend, Kim. They go cruising again and then visit their mum who confesses that she threatened to call the police on Max after seeing his texts to Byron. They angrily leave and eventually end up in a karaoke bar where they meet Max with a new boyfriend. Byron confronts him and storms off to the basement where they save Sasha from the drug dealer whose drugs she stole by aggressively impugning him. Liam invites the Divas to party at his place, and gives Byron ketamine. The next day, Byron returns to Liam's to get the keys, and he teases and flirts with them, leaving his phone number. Byron is smitten by Liam's rude and aggressive manners.
3	"Episode 3"	Brian Welsh	Paul Williams	3 June 2025
Byron's drug use leads to repeated hallucinations. Die is invited to an audition for a music video. Byron visits Liam, who is affectionate at times but threatens them with a knife for fun. They stay over and have sex with Liam. Next day Liam offers Byron to have sex with Dean, a wealthy paedophile who is into BDSM, to help Liam pay off his debts; Byron agrees. Byron and Sasha get increasingly hostile towards each other with Byron often mocking Sasha's intellect. Byron meets Liam before they see Dean, but he cancels; Liam goes on a rampage yelling that he is dead without that money. Byron celebrates their 16th birthday with the Divas and their accepting grandmother Joe who is turning 60. Sasha tells her that Byron is having sex for money, but Joe is not shocked. Liam continues supplying drugs to Byron and they have unprotected sex. Byron, Joe and Lisa have a celebratory lunch, but Byron rejects Lisa's gift. Die comes to the audition but is ridiculed by queueing competitors and is attacked by transphobic passersby. Byron meets Dean and empties his bank cards while Liam holds him at a gun point. Once Byron returns, Dean is released. Liam taunts Byron with the gun before revealing that it is a toy.
4	"Episode 4"	Ng Choon Ping	Paris Lees & Sarah Simmonds	3 June 2025
Byron is happy to get Dean's money but feels intense pity for him and often sees him in nightmares. Divas go shopping and Byron steals a blonde wig. Die lies to Byron that she got the part. Bev, the club bouncer introduces the Divas to Bradley, her nephew, but makes it clear that none of them can have sex with him; Sasha and Byron start a contest to seduce Bradley. Die gets increasingly uncomfortable with Sasha and Byron recklessly picking up drunk men on the street for sex. When one of them discovers that Byron has a penis, he goes into rage and chases them away. Die and Sasha teach Byron how to reveal their transness to men without triggering their anger. Byron notices a bruise on Die's forehead and Die tells them that she didn't actually audition. Byron comes to meet Lisa's new boyfriend and resentfully talks about her. Byron has sex for money with a police officer, David, who tries to "Pretty Woman" (save) them, but Byron prefers to have sex with any men that are eager instead. The Divas notice Bradley at a pool and Sasha ends up taking him home after loudly asking if he wants to have sex with a "transsexual". Byron and Sasha have a fight while Die is terrified for their safety. Byron tells Die about the robbery. Liam gets arrested.
5	"Episode 5"	Brian Welsh	Paul Williams	3 June 2025
Byron goes on a bender taking all the drugs they can find. The hallucinations get stronger and Byron gets increasingly paranoid. Joe calls Byron telling them that the police is looking for them. Liam finds Byron in a club and tells them that they have to confirm Liam's alibi. During a fight with Byron at the club, Sasha proudly announces that she's having sex with Bradley, and Bev attacks her with a baton. Byron falls asleep next to a TV and briefly wakes up sitting close to Liam who gives them a cigarette laced with some drug. Byron has a vivid nightmare about Dean and then another one with flashbacks about their childhood with other children mocking them for saying they are a girl and Steven destroying a paper referral to a child psychologist about gender dysphoria. Byron goes to the police station trying to confess to the robbery, but they are so inebriated that the police send them away. Byron goes to their grandmother's who cares about them. Samantha visits and is worried about their self-destructing drug use. Next day, Byron apologises to Sasha and they agree to move in together. The police call Byron and they repeat what Liam told them to say. Byron gets a job at a call centre, but the police arrive to Sasha's and arrest Byron.
6	"Episode 6"	Ng Choon Ping	Georgia Christou	3 June 2025
Byron is waiting for the sentencing at the court, but the judge refuses to pass a sentence without Liam and postpones the hearing. Byron celebrates the last few weeks of freedom with the Divas. Byron's youth offending officer Alison suggests getting another reference letter to increase the chances of a more lenient verdict. Lisa invites Byron to go on a holiday to France and says that Joe told her about the court case, but thinks that Byron stole a car. Die gets tired of Byron's selfishness. In France, Byron enjoys the slower pace and impresses another British family by their opinions about literature. They bond with their mum, but ultimately end up fighting because Lisa is unwilling to accept that Byron is transgender. Byron tells her that the court case is actually about an armed robbery. Lisa stays in bed the whole next day, and Byron goes on a walk with other tourists. A woman from the friendly family offers to write a reference for Byron. Upon return to Hucknall, Byron discovers that Bev had assaulted Sasha and destroyed the apartment. On another hearing, Liam continues not showing up in court, but the judge goes ahead and sentences Byron to two years in a juvenile prison.
7	"Episode 7"	Marie Kristiansen	Mika Onyx Johnson	3 June 2025
In prison, other inmates realise that Byron is gay and start bullying them. Byron repeatedly tries calling Die but she is not picking up her phone. An aggressive inmate Carl takes Byron's cigarettes. During prison classes, Byron surprises the teacher with their academic ability and enrols into an advanced course, which increases their chances of an early release. In their cell, Byron watches the fifth season of the Big Brother featuring Nadia Almada, a trans contestant. Carl constantly picks on Byron. Die picks up her phone and promises to come visit together with Samantha, but does not show up on the day, and Byron is so upset with Die that Samantha leaves too. Carl is angry that the teacher gives Byron extra attention, and trashes their cell. Byron confronts him about it and ends up helping him to write to his mother asking to come to an appeal session. A new muscular inmate Freddie shows up. Nadia Almada wins the Big Brother, making Byron happy. Byron gets an early release on August 20, about which they tell Carl who also becomes more compassionate. Freddie and Byron have sex in the kitchen, but later realise that there is a CCTV camera pointing right at where they were. Hearing about this, Carl, who lost the appeal, attacks Byron for destroying their chances of getting out, then attempts suicide in his cell. Byron confesses about having sex with Freddie to the warden, who tells them that the CCTV camera does not work. Byron makes up with Samantha and gets their early release. Walking away from the prison past the courtyard, they tie up their shirt and swing their hips as Carl and other inmates whistle at their back.
8	"Episode 8"	Marie Kristiansen	Sarah Simmonds	3 June 2025
Byron starts living as a woman. She gets an interview at University of Birmingham, but fails because of the admission board's transphobia. Lisa continues scolding Byron for transitioning. Byron visits Die who is now a professional dancer, but she continues being distant. No one knows where Sasha is. Byron encounters Max at a bingo hall; he offers her to call him, but she does not want to unblock his number. Byron returns to Die after discovering Sasha's ad in a newspaper; they call the number together and reunite with Sasha. Alison informs Byron that University of Brighton invited them to an interview and removes the tag. Byron celebrates by clubbing with the Divas. Upon return, she discovers Joe coughing up blood and takes her to the hospital, where the doctors tell her and Lisa that Joe is dying from lung cancer. Byron unblocks Max and spends the night with him, but Max is still doing sex work and lives in a dilapidated apartment. Byron goes to Joe's bedside instead of the interview, talking to Lisa while Joe dies. She then returns to Max's, but Alison leaves her a voice mail saying that Brighton postponed the meeting due to the death of Byron's grandmother. Byron hastily leaves and gives a good impression during the interview; she is accepted. Byron offers Sasha and Die to go to Brighton together, but they refuse. Lisa drives Byron to the bus station and says that she will try to understand her; Byron realises that Lisa told Alison about Joe, arranging the second interview. In the university, Byron starts using the name Paris.

== Reception ==
The first season of the show received universal critical acclaim. The Guardian hailed it as a "memorably complex psychological portrait" and praised Howard as "charismatic and convincing" in the lead role. Financial Times also singled out Howard for praise, calling the performance "at once charismatic and vulnerable, exhilarated and fatalistic, sharp-tongued and soft-hearted". The Telegraph hailed Howard as "magnetic", uplifting the story from being a generic entry in the "misunderstood child coming of age in a small town" genre. Digital Spy said, "It's no exaggeration to suggest that What It Feels Like for a Girl could do for trans representation what It's a Sin did a few years back for gay storytelling and awareness around the AIDS crisis”.

== Awards and nominations ==
Year	Association	Category	Nominee(s)	Result	Ref.
2025	Rose d'Or	Drama	What It Feels Like For a Girl	Nominated	
2025	RTS Craft & Design Awards	Casting Award	Nathan Toth	Nominated	
2025	RTS Craft & Design Awards	Costume Design – Scripted	Nirage Mirage	Nominated	
2025	RTS Craft & Design Awards	Director – Scripted	Brian Welsh	Nominated	
2025	RTS Craft & Design Awards	Editing – Scripted	Sam White	Nominated	
2025	RTS Craft & Design Awards	Photography – Scripted	Si Bell	Nominated	
2025	RTS Craft & Design Awards	Production Design – Scripted	Gem Randall & Miri Katz	Nominated	
2025	The Digital Spy Reader Awards	TV - British Rising Star	Ellis Howard	2nd Place	
2025	The Digital Spy Reader Awards	TV - British Rising Star	Hannah Jones	3rd Place	
2026	BSC Award	Best Cinematography in a Television Drama (UK Terrestrial)	Neus Ollé (for "Episode 7")	Nominated	
2026	RTS Programme Awards	Breakthrough Award	Ellis Howard	Nominated	
2026	RTS Programme Awards	Limited Series and Single Drama	What It Feels Like for a Girl	Nominated	
2026	BAFTA Craft Awards	Best Writer, Drama	Paris Lees	Nominated	
2026	BAFTA Craft Awards	Best Scripted Casting	Nathan Toth	Nominated	
2026	BAFTA Television Awards	Leading Actor	Ellis Howard	Nominated	
2026	BAFTA Television Awards	Limited Drama	What It Feels Like for a Girl	Nominated	
2026	BAFTA Television Awards	Memorable Moment	"Byron leaves for Brighton to start university, where she introduces herself as Paris"	Nominated	
