= The Last Tree (film) =

2019 film

- Film poster
- Directed by: Shola Amoo
- Written by: Shola Amoo
- Produced by: Myf Hopkins; Lee Thomas
- Starring: Sam Adewunmi; Gbemisola Ikumelo; Denise Black; Tai Golding; Ruthxjiah Bellenea; Demmy Ladipo; Nicholas Pinnock
- Cinematography: Stil Williams
- Edited by: Mdhamiri Á Nkemi
- Music by: Segun Akinola
- Production companies: British Film Institute; Prodigal Film & TV; in association with; Hartley Media; Privateer Pictures
- Release dates: 24 January 2019 (Sundance); 27 September 2019 (UK)
- Running time: 99 minutes
- Country: United Kingdom
- Language: English

The Last Tree is a 2019 British semi-autobiographical drama film directed by Shola Amoo. It premiered at the World Cinema Dramatic Competition section of the 2019 Sundance Film Festival and was released in the UK on 27 September 2019.

== Plot ==
Growing up with his foster mother amongst the rolling fields of rural Lincolnshire, Femi's young life seems as idyllic as the landscape. But when he returns to London to live with his birth mother he begins to struggle with the culture and values of his new environment. As the years pass, he must decide which path to adulthood he wants to take and what it means to be a young black man in London during the early 2000s. His search for self and identity will take him on an emotionally charged and utterly unforgettable journey through various stages of his life.

== Cast ==
- Sam Adewunmi as Femi
- Gbemisola Ikumelo as Yinka
- Denise Black as Mary
- Tai Golding as Younger Femi
- Nicholas Pinnock as Mr Williams
- Ruthxjiah Bellenea as Tope
- Demmy Ladipo as Mace

== Release ==
After premiering at 2019 Sundance Film Festival where it was well received, the film had its UK premiere at Sundance London in May 2019 and was released in UK cinemas on 27 September by Picturehouse Entertainment. It was released on DVD, Blu-Ray and Digital on 27 January 2020.

== Reception ==
On release, The Observer's Mark Kermode made it his "Film of the Week," saying it was a "tender tale of an uprooted childhood" and that "Powerful performances, tactile visuals and an elegantly fluid score add to the impact of this impressively understated yet profoundly moving tale."

Nigel Andrew for the Financial Times called it the "hypnotic work of a natural-born film-maker;" Variety's Guy Lodge found it a "stirring study of a black teenager carving out his own identity in modern Britain;" and Andy Lea for the Daily Star said that "excellent acting, great writing and a powerful sense of time and place power this stylish coming-of-age tale."

In December 2019 it was included as one of Time Out's best films of 2019. It continues to be very well received with a 98% rating on Rotten Tomatoes. The site's critical consensus reads, "Distinctive in terms of content, perspective, and insight, The Last Tree vividly depicts the turmoil of adolescence with remarkable grace."

== Accolades ==
Shola Amoo won Best Screenplay at the Writers' Guild Awards 2020

At 2019 BIFAs, Sam Adewunmi won Most Promising Newcomer for playing Femi and Ruthxjiah Bellenea received the Best Supporting Actress for her role as Tope "drawing cheers for her tearful acceptance speech in which she thanked teachers and the team on the film. Sam Adewunmi was also nominated for Best Actor and Shaheen Baig and Aisha Bywaters were nominated for Best Casting.

In December 2019, BAFTA shortlisted the film and producer Myf Hopkins, for Outstanding Debut by a British writer, director or producer

Segun Akinola was nominated as Discovery of the Year 2019 at the World Soundtrack Awards.
