= Ian Byrne =

British politician (born 1972)

Ian Byrne MP
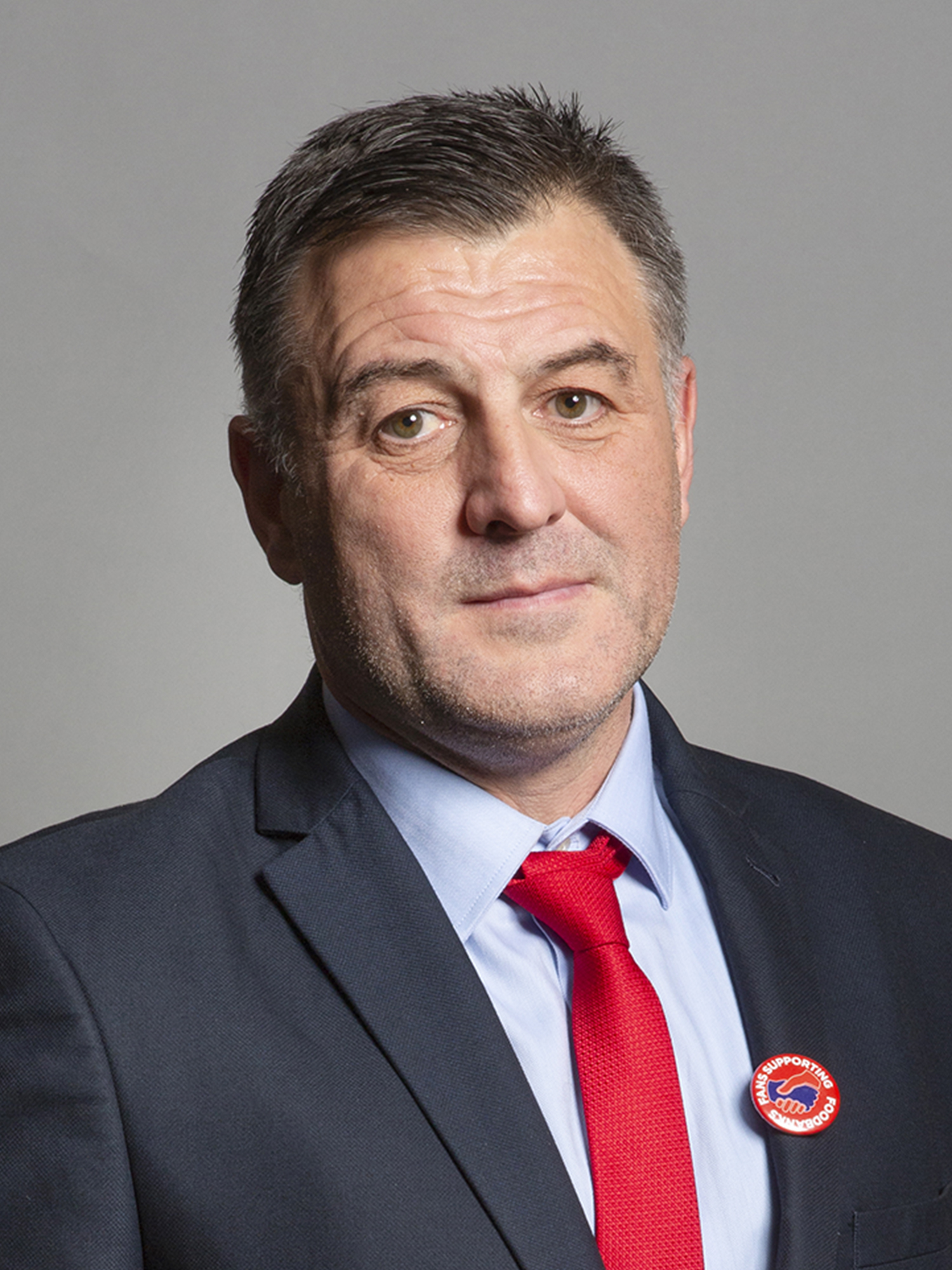
- Official portrait, 2019

Member of Parliament for Liverpool West Derby
- Incumbent
- Assumed office 12 December 2019
- Preceded by: Stephen Twigg
- Majority: 20,423 (53.8%)

Personal details
- Born: Ian Robert Byrne; 10 May 1972 (age 54) Liverpool, England
- Party: Labour
- Other political affiliations: Independent (2024–2025); Socialist Campaign Group
- Education: Open University
- Website: Official website

Ian Robert Byrne (born 10 May 1972) is a British Labour politician who has been the Member of Parliament (MP) for Liverpool West Derby since 2019.

== Early life and career ==
Ian Byrne was born on 10 May 1972 in Liverpool. He grew up on the Stockbridge Village (formerly Cantril Farm) estate in the city. At the age of 16 he was present at the Hillsborough disaster and escaped before the crush occurred. His father was seriously injured.

He worked as a taxi driver while studying at The Open University, gaining a degree over six years. He was an active member of Unite the Union, where he later was employed as a trade union organiser. His work included organising sub-contracted NHS workers for better pay and conditions.

In 2015, Byrne co-founded Fans Supporting Foodbanks, a community initiative by football fans to tackle food poverty in Liverpool.

In 2018, Byrne was elected as a councillor to Liverpool City Council, representing the Everton ward alongside Labour's Cllr Jane Corbett and Cllr Frank Prendergast MBE. He continued to serve as a local councillor after becoming an MP, donating his councillor's allowance to Vauxhall Law Centre. In 2022, Byrne stood down from his council seat and was succeeded by his daughter, Ellie.

== Parliamentary career ==
On 3 November 2019, Byrne was selected as the Labour candidate for Liverpool West Derby. Byrne won the "chaotic" selection process by three votes against local councillor Angela Coleman. Byrne apologised when it was reported he had posted historical comments abusing Conservative politicians, a joke involving the Paralympics and a homophobic slur on his Facebook account; the account was then deleted. Liz Truss called on Byrne to stand down as a candidate following the controversy. Labour shadow Chancellor John McDonnell publicly supported Byrne's nomination.

At the 2019 general election, Byrne was elected to Parliament as MP for Liverpool West Derby with 77.6% of the vote and a majority of 29,984.

Byrne was a supporter of the leadership of Jeremy Corbyn. He is a member of the Socialist Campaign Group and backed his Campaign Group colleagues Rebecca Long-Bailey and Richard Burgon in the 2020 Labour leadership election and deputy leadership election.

In December 2020, Byrne launched a campaign for the Right to Food to be written into UK law. Byrne was named as "Overall MP of the Year" for 2021 by the Patchwork Foundation, in recognition for his campaigning against food insecurity and workers' rights during the COVID-19 pandemic.

During 2022, Byrne was criticised by some Labour members for allegedly putting campaigns on food poverty and the legacy of the Hillsborough disaster ahead of constituency issues. West Derby Constituency Labour Party branches and affiliates voted to trigger a reselection process for the seat in October 2022. Byrne raised concerns about the reselection process, and threatened to take legal action after alleging multiple rule breaches. He said he would consider getting police guidance over alleged intimidation at a campaign event. Supporters of his rival said there was no intimidation and one called on Byrne to retract his allegation.

At the 2024 general election, Byrne was re-elected to Parliament as MP for Liverpool West Derby with a decreased vote share of 66.6% and a decreased majority of 20,423.

On 23 July 2024, Byrne, along with six other Labour MPs, had the whip withdrawn and was suspended from the Labour Party for six months for voting for a SNP amendment to end the two-child benefit cap. The whip was restored on 5 February 2025.

== Personal life ==
Byrne is a supporter of Liverpool F.C. and a committee member of Liverpool supporters' union Spirit of Shankly.

Parliament of the United Kingdom
Preceded by Stephen Twigg	Member of Parliament for Liverpool West Derby; 2019–present	Incumbent
