= Brian Welsh (filmmaker) =

Scottish filmmaker (born 1981)

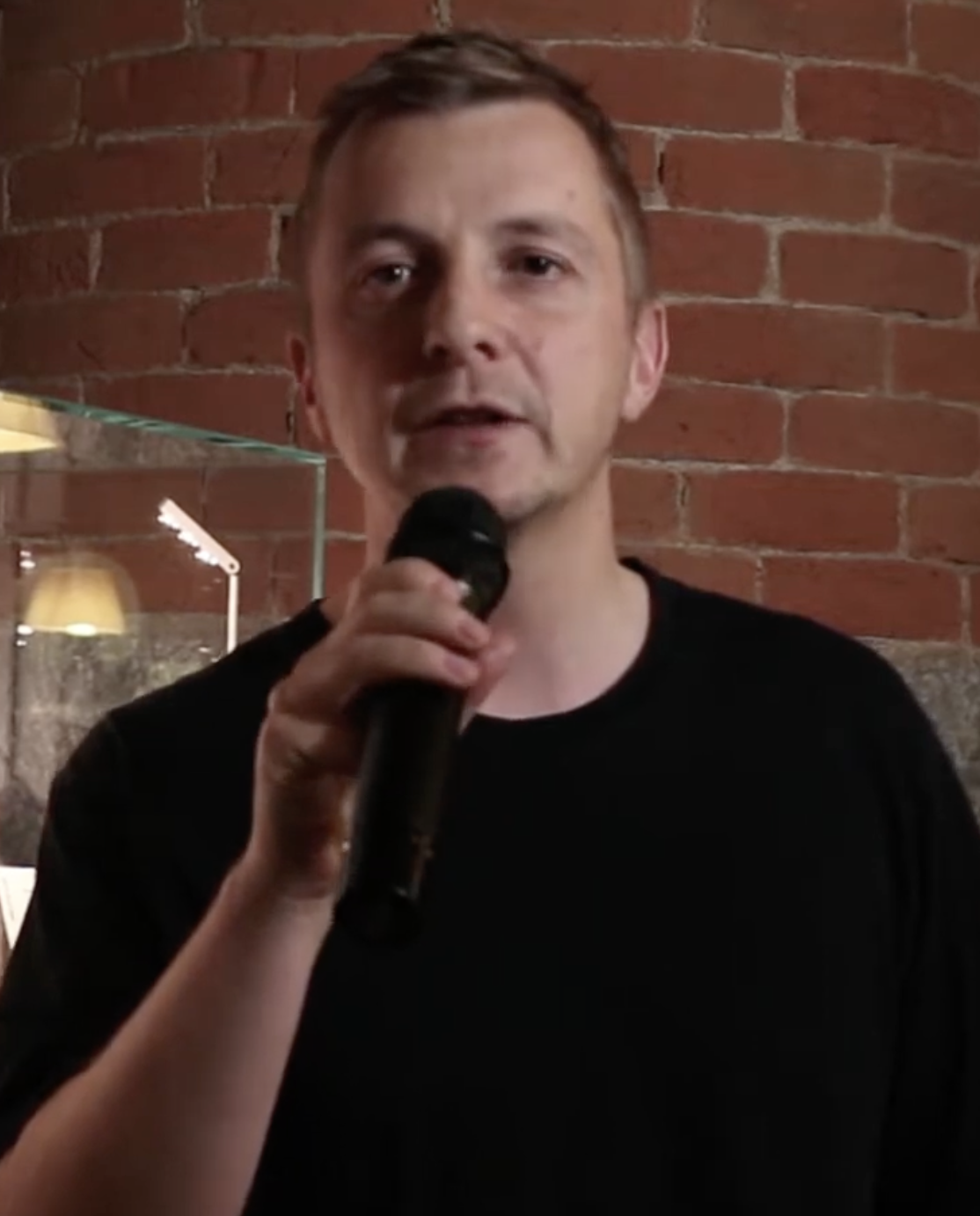
- Welsh in 2019
- Born: 1981 (age 44–45); Falkirk, Scotland
- Education: Cleveland College of Art and Design; National Film and Television School
- Occupations: Director; writer
- Years active: 2009–present

Brian Welsh (born 1981) is a Scottish film and television director and screenwriter. His film, Beats (2019), received generally positive reviews. He has also directed the Black Mirror episode "The Entire History of You" (2011), and several BBC television series, including What It Feels Like for a Girl.

== Early and personal life ==
Welsh was born in Falkirk, Scotland in 1981, and moved to Aberdeen when he was 10. As of May 2019, he divided his time between Cornwall, England, and Aberdeen, Scotland.

== Career ==
Welsh studied filmmaking at the Cleveland College of Art and Design, where he became interested in film editing. He worked as an editor in Glasgow following his graduation, and then enrolled in the National Film and Television School. In his last year, Welsh was given a small budget and directed a film, Kin. Following that, he worked on another low budget film, In Our Name (2010). The film is about a female soldier returning to Britain after tour in Iraq, and struggling to re-adapt to society. In 2011, he directed the Black Mirror episode "The Entire History of You".

In 2015, it was announced that Welsh would direct a Winston Churchill biopic, Churchill (2017), starring Brian Cox. However, he was later replaced by Jonathan Teplitzky. The same year, he directed Glasgow Girls, a television series based on the Glasgow Girls, a group of female activists raising awareness of the treatment of asylum seekers in Scotland. The series won the "Television Drama" category at the 2015 British Academy Scotland Awards.

In 2019, Welsh directed Beats, a coming-of-age adaptation of a stage play that received generally positive reviews. The film was adapted from the stage play Beats by Kieran Hurley, which Welsh first saw in 2012 and described as personally resonant with his own teenage experiences in Aberdeen at the end of the rave era. Wendy Ide for The Guardian called the movie "the liveliest work to date" of Welsh's filmography. The film was the final one shown at the 2019 Glasgow Film Festival.

In 2025, Welsh was the lead director of the BBC television adaptation of What It Feels Like for a Girl, based on the memoir by Paris Lees. The series follows a transgender girl growing up in the East Midlands club culture during the early 2000s. Welsh is scheduled to direct The Return Of Stanley Atwell, a thriller starring Nicholas Galitzine and Ella Purnell.

== Filmography ==
=== Film ===
Year	Title	Director	Writer	Ref.
2009	Kin	Yes	Yes	
2010	In Our Name	Yes	Yes	
2016	The Rack Pack	Yes	No	
2019	Beats	Yes	Yes	
TBA	The Return of Stanley Atwell	Yes	Yes	

=== Television ===
Year	Title	Director	Writer	Ref.
2011	"The Entire History of You" (Black Mirror)	Yes	No	
2013	Mayday	Yes	No	
2013	The Escape Artist	Yes	No	
2015	Glasgow Girls	Yes	Yes	
2025	What It Feels Like for a Girl	Yes	No	

== Awards and nominations ==
Awards and nominations received by Brian Welsh
Award	Year	Category	Nominated work	Result	Ref.
BAFTA Scotland	2015	Television Drama	Glasgow Girls	Won	
BAFTA Scotland	2019	Director – Fiction	Beats	Nominated	
Broadcast Awards	2015	Best Original Programme	Glasgow Girls	Won	
Rose d'Or	2025	Best Drama	What It Feels Like for a Girl	Nominated	
Royal Television Society Craft & Design Awards	2025	Director – Scripted	What It Feels Like for a Girl	Nominated	
Royal Television Society Scotland Awards	2016	Television Director of the Year	The Rack Pack	Nominated	
Writers' Guild Awards	2020	Best Screenplay (Note: With Kieran Hurley)	Beats	Nominated	
