= Fans Supporting Foodbanks =

Charitable initiative in Liverpool

- Founded: 2015
- Founder: Ian Byrne; Dave Kelly; Robbie Daniels
- Purpose: Reducing poverty and hunger in the United Kingdom through a system of democratic socialism
- Origins: Liverpool, England
- Method: Food banks
- Website: https://fanssupportingfoodbanks.co.uk

Fans Supporting Foodbanks is a joint initiative between supporters of rival football clubs Liverpool F.C. and Everton F.C., founded in 2015 to tackle food poverty in Liverpool. It provides a quarter of all food donations to north Liverpool food banks and has helped to develop a network of fan-driven food banks across the UK. It is an example of progressive football fan activism.

== History ==
Fans Supporting Foodbanks is a partnership between Everton Supporters' Trust and Spirit of Shankly supporters' union. It was founded in 2015 by Liverpool fan Ian Byrne and Everton fans Dave Kelly and Robbie Daniels in response to rising food poverty linked to the programme of austerity implemented by the UK government from 2010.

Taking inspiration from Celtic F.C. fan group The Green Brigade, Fans Supporting Foodbanks started collecting food donations in wheelie-bins outside pubs on matchdays. Both Liverpool and Everton football clubs have shown strong support for the initiative. As well as holding collections at home games, Fans Supporting Foodbanks bring food to donate to rival fans' foodbanks during away fixtures, as a show of solidarity. The group's motto is: "Hunger doesn't wear club colours."

In 2018, Liverpool F.C. chief executive, Peter Moore, donated a vehicle through his foundation. Fans Supporting Foodbanks’ purple van (a mix of the two clubs' colours) is used to transport food donations from across the city and can be found outside Anfield and Goodison on matchdays. In August, Liverpool podcast and fanzine The Anfield Wrap commissioned a mural of Liverpool F.C.'s Trent Alexander-Arnold, created by French graffiti artist Akse, dedicated to Fans Supporting Foodbanks. The mural can be found on Sybil Road near Anfield Stadium.

Ahead of the 2019 general election, Fans Supporting Foodbanks co-founder Ian Byrne was selected as the Labour's candidate for Liverpool West Derby. On 12 December 2019, Byrne was elected with 77.6% of the vote.

In November 2020, Fans Supporting Foodbanks launched a mobile community food pantry.

== Work ==
=== Countering the far-right ===
Fans Supporting Foodbanks consider their work as a response to football fan groups with links to the far-right, such as the Football Lads Alliance. The group partners with religious and ethnic minority groups to organise joint collections and events with the aim of breaking down barriers between communities. In 2018, Fans Supporting Foodbanks invited football fans to screenings of World Cup games at the Abdullah Quilliam Mosque.

Journalist Ash Sarkar wrote in The Guardian:

"This endeavour shows that football doesn't have to be the domain of racists and Islamophobes, and that mosques aren't some culturally alien and terrifying enclave. By addressing the immediate economic conditions of the neighbourhoods around them, anti-racist activists can bring together seemingly opposed communities and close down the gaps where the far right are able to organise."

=== COVID-19 response ===
During the COVID-19 pandemic, Fans Supporting Foodbanks set up a new food distribution hub and co-ordinated efforts to produce personal protective equipment for frontline NHS and care workers.

When football matches were being played behind closed doors and the Premier League charged £14.95 to watch some matches on television, Fans Supporting Foodbanks encouraged supporters to boycott pay-per-view matches and donate the amount to foodbanks instead, raising over £100,000. Pay-per-view was scrapped soon after.

=== Right to Food ===
In December 2020, Ian Byrne and Fans Supporting Foodbanks launched a campaign for the Right to Food to be written into UK law. In January 2021, Liverpool City Council unanimously voted to support the Right to Food being enshrined in law, making it the UK's first 'Right to Food' city.

== Awards ==
- In 2018, Fans Supporting Foodbanks were awarded the Bill Shankly Community Award in the Liverpool Player of the Season Awards.
- In November 2018, Fans Supporting Foodbanks were awarded the Alan Ball "Ball of Fire" Award.
- In January 2020, Fans Supporting Foodbanks were named as one of The Big Issue's Top 100 Changemakers for 2020.
