= 2019 British Academy Scotland Awards =

Award show

- Date: 3 November 2019
- Site: DoubleTree by Hilton Hotel Glasgow Central, Glasgow, Scotland
- Hosted by: Edith Bowman

Television coverage
- Network: Streaming webcast

The 29th British Academy Scotland Awards were held on 3 November 2019 at the DoubleTree by Hilton Hotel Glasgow Central, honouring the best Scottish film and television productions of 2018. The nominations were announced by Edith Bowman on 25 September 2019.

== Nominees ==
Best Feature Film	Best Director (Fiction)
Wild Rose; Freedom Fields; Only You	Jon S. Baird - Stan & Ollie; Johnny Kenton - Endeavour; Brian Welsh - Beats
Best Actor in Film	Best Actress in Film
Lorn Macdonald - Beats; Jack Lowden - Mary Queen of Scots; Peter Mullan - The Vanishing	Jessie Buckley - Wild Rose; Shirley Henderson - Stan & Ollie; Florence Pugh - Outlaw King
Best Entertainment	Best Features & Factual Series
Last Commanders; The Dog Ate My Homework; Hogmanay Live	Murder Case; Getting Hitched: Asian Style; Rogue To Wrestler
Best Actor in Television	Best Actress in Television
Alex Ferns - Chernobyl; Ncuti Gatwa - Sex Education; Richard Madden - Bodyguard	Kelly Macdonald - The Victim; Morven Christie - The Bay; Jenna Coleman - The Cry
Best Writer Film/Television	Best Television Scripted
Nicole Taylor - Wild Rose; Jacquelin Perske - The Cry; Kirstie Swain - Pure	The Cry - Claire Mundell, Glendyn Ivin, Jacquelin Perske, Brian Kaczynski; Two Doors Down - Sasha Ransome, Catherine Gosling Fuller, Simon Carlyle, Gregor Sharpe; The Victim - Production Team
Best Director (Factual)	Best Specialist Factual
Matt Pinder - Murder Case; Greg Clark - Real Kashmir F.C.; Louise Lockwood - imagine... Hockney, the Queen and the Royal Peculiar	Yes/No: Inside the Indyref - STV Productions/BBC Scotland; Fashion's Dirty Secret - Hello Halo Productions & Oak Island Films/BBC One; The Flu That Killed 50 Million - Production Team - BBC Studios PQP/BBC Two
Best Single Documentary	Best Short Film
Real Kashmir F.C. - Matchlight, Bodhi Media/BBC Scotland; The Bank That Almost Broke Britain - STV Productions/BBC Two; In Sight Of Home: The Iolaire - BBC Scotland/BBC Two Scotland	That Joke Isn't Funny Anymore - Hannah Currie, Beth Allen; Jealous Alan - Martin Clark, James Heath; Red Hill - Laura Carreira, Ramón Durman, Billy Mack
Best Animation	Best Game
Love, Death & Robots - Helping Hand; 4:3; The Fabric Of You	Observation; Bloons Adventure Time TD; Socketeer

=== Outstanding Contribution to Television ===
The Creative Team Behind Still Game: Greg Hemphill, Ford Kiernan, Michael Hines.

=== Outstanding Contribution to Craft ===
Pat Rambaut

== See also ==
- 72nd British Academy Film Awards
- 91st Academy Awards
- 25th Screen Actors Guild Awards
