= British Independent Film Award for Breakthrough Performance =

British film award

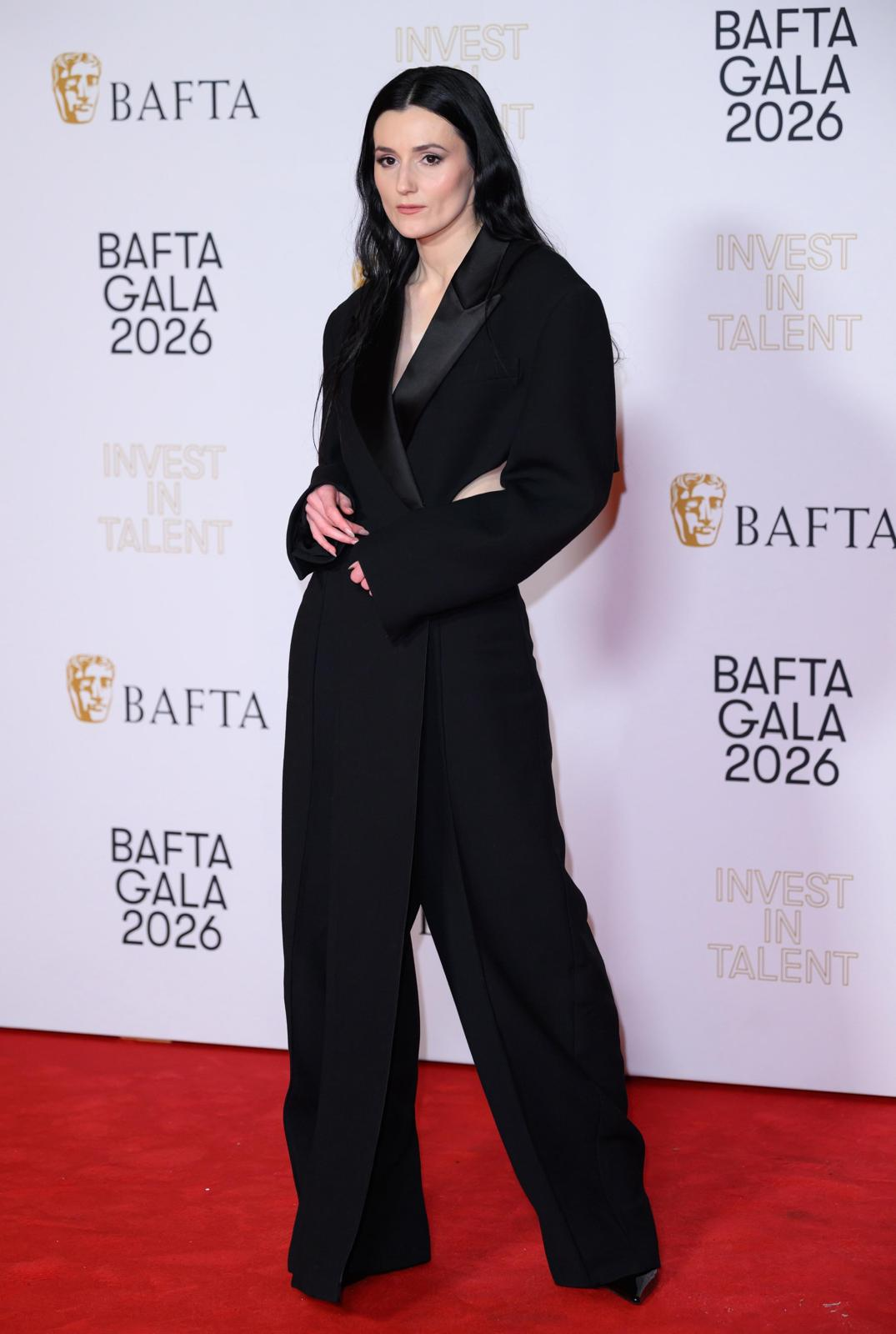
- 2025 Recipient: Posy Sterling
- Awarded for: Best Performance by a Newcomer
- Country: United Kingdom
- Presented by: BIFA
- First award: 1998
- Currently held by: Posy Sterling for Lollipop (2025)
- Website: www.bifa.film

The British Independent Film Award for Breakthrough Performance is an annual award given by the British Independent Film Awards (BIFA). The award was first presented in the 1998 ceremony, until 2020 the category was presented as Most Promising Newcomer.

Actress Laila Morse was the first recipient of this award for her performance as Janet in Nil by Mouth. The category with a wider meaning of "newcomer", including new actors but also directors, cinematographers, editors, etc., since 2001 the category is directed towards only actors.

According to BIFA, the category is for "British performers taking their first significant role in a theatrical feature film", it also states that "eligibility of performers with significant theatre or TV credits will be determined by the Nomination Committee". The category includes both leading and supporting performances.

== Winners and nominees ==
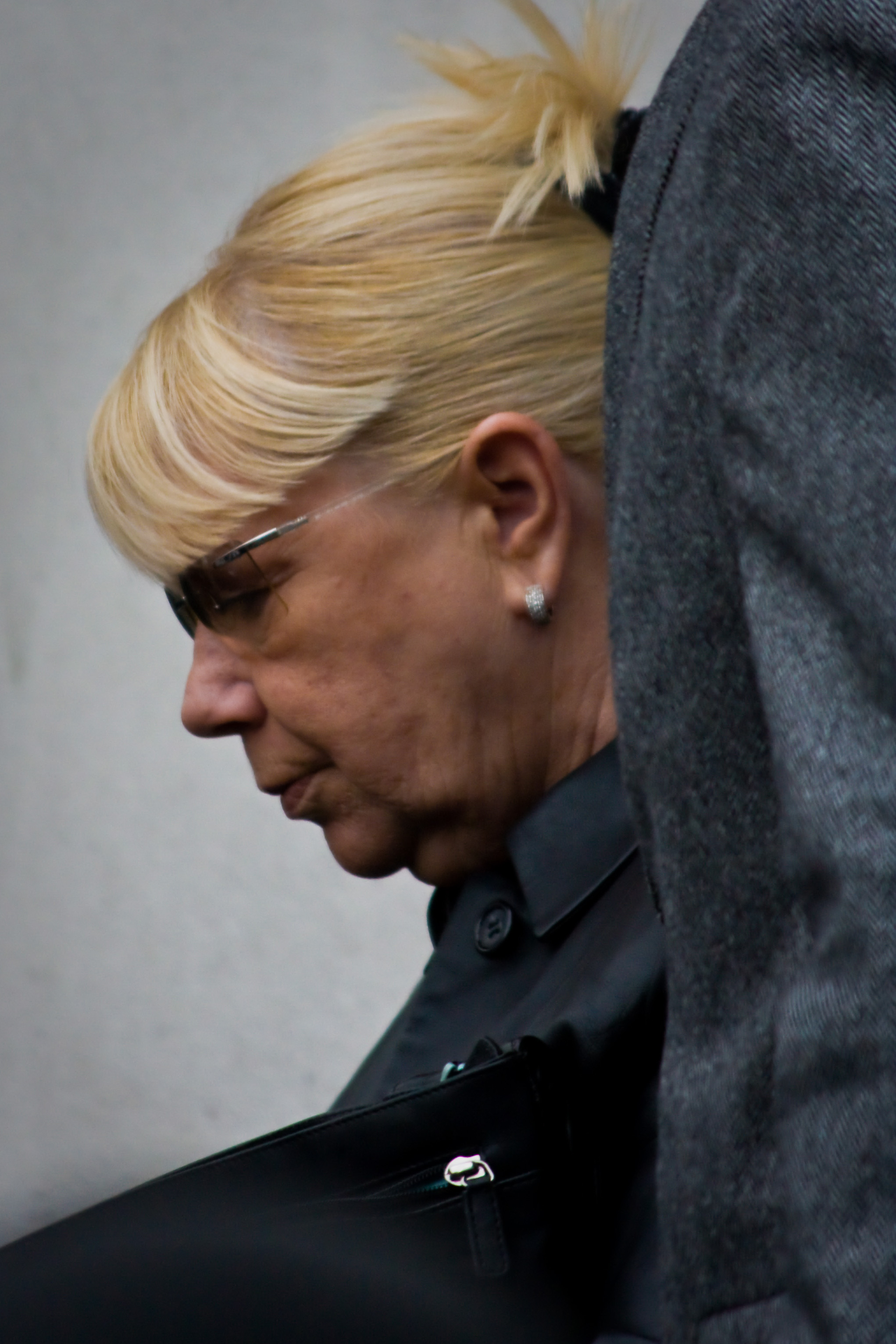
Laila Morse won for Nil by Mouth (1998).

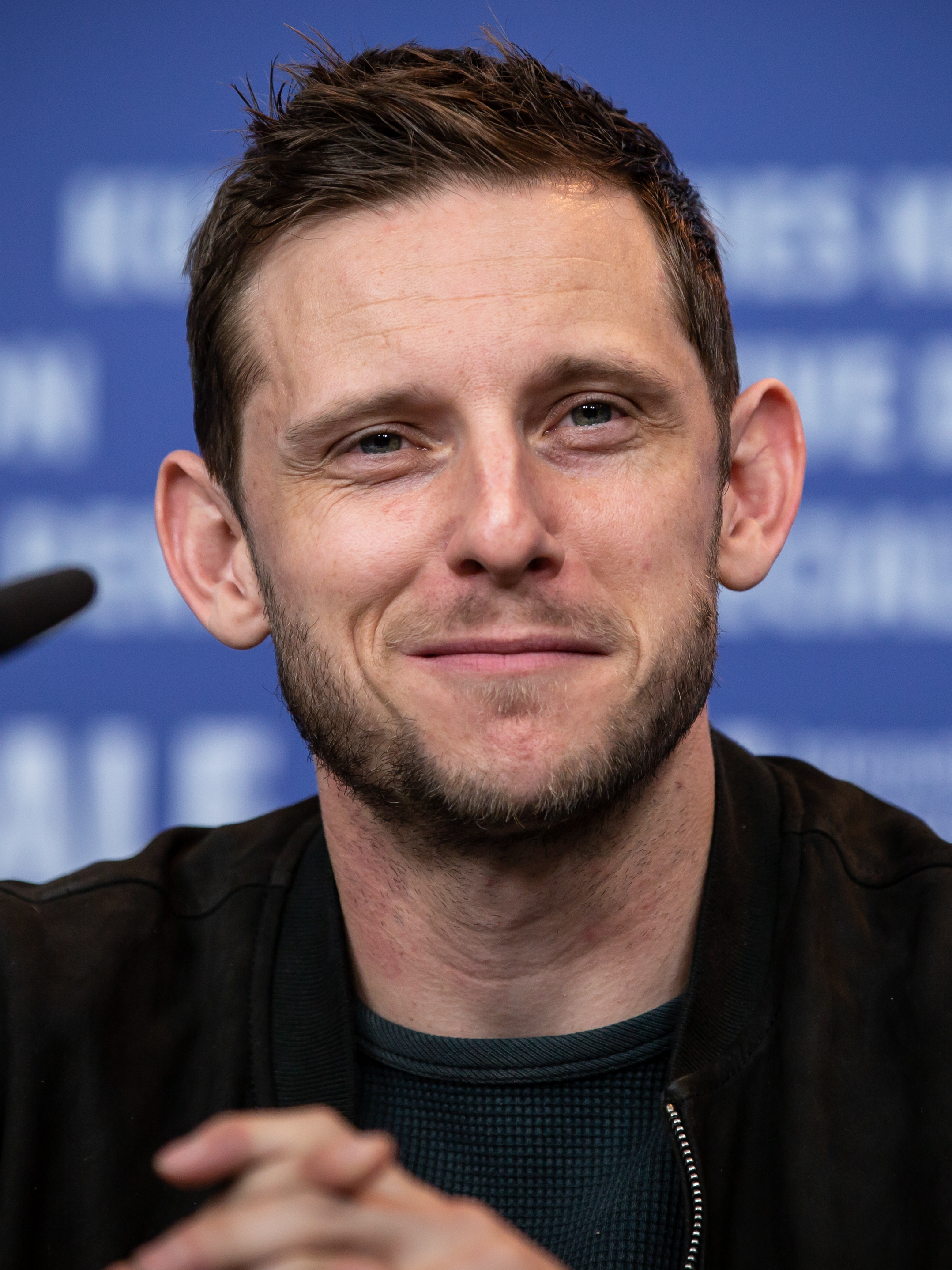
Jamie Bell won for Billy Elliot (2000).

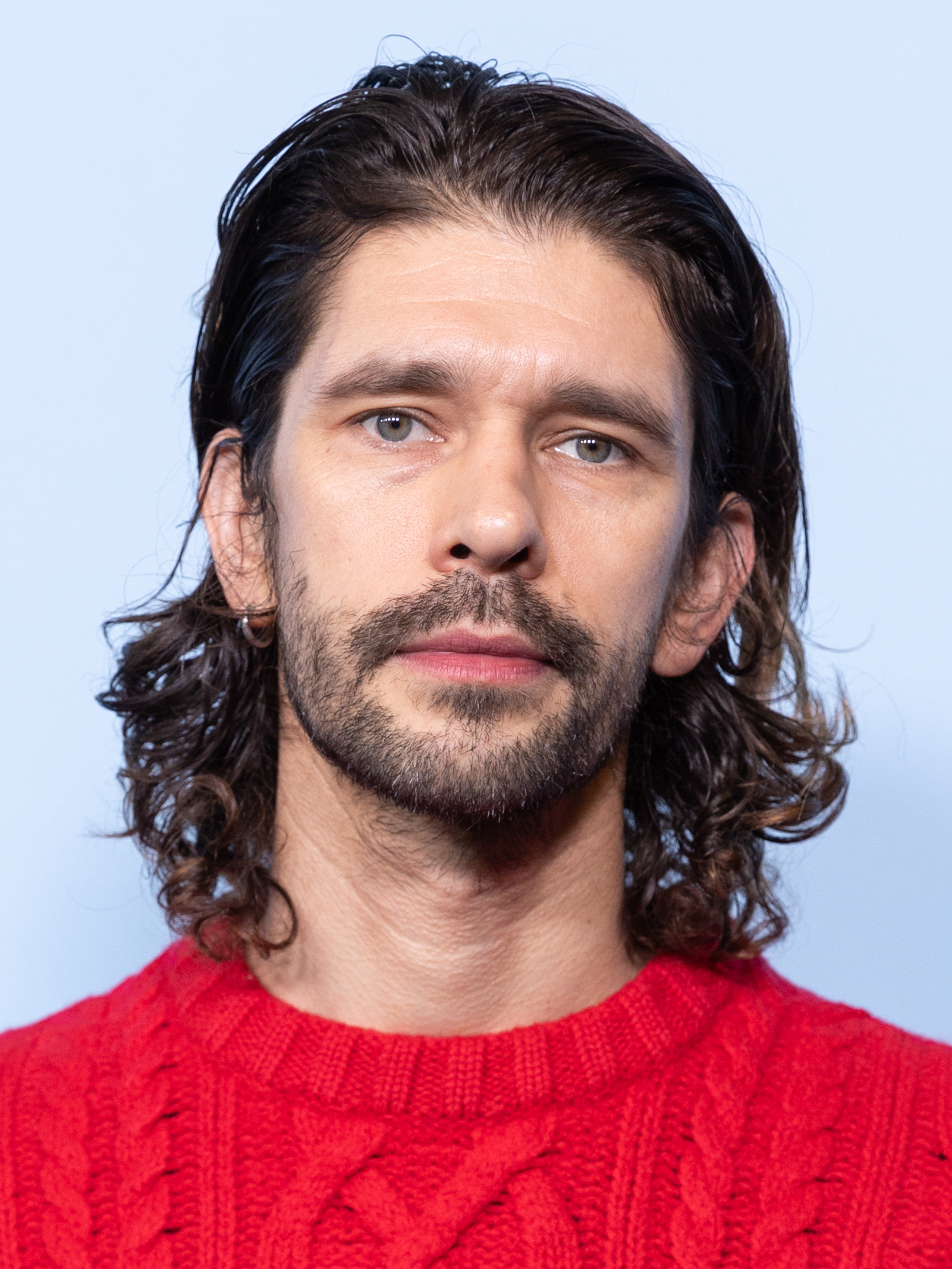
Ben Whishaw won for My Brother Tom (2001).

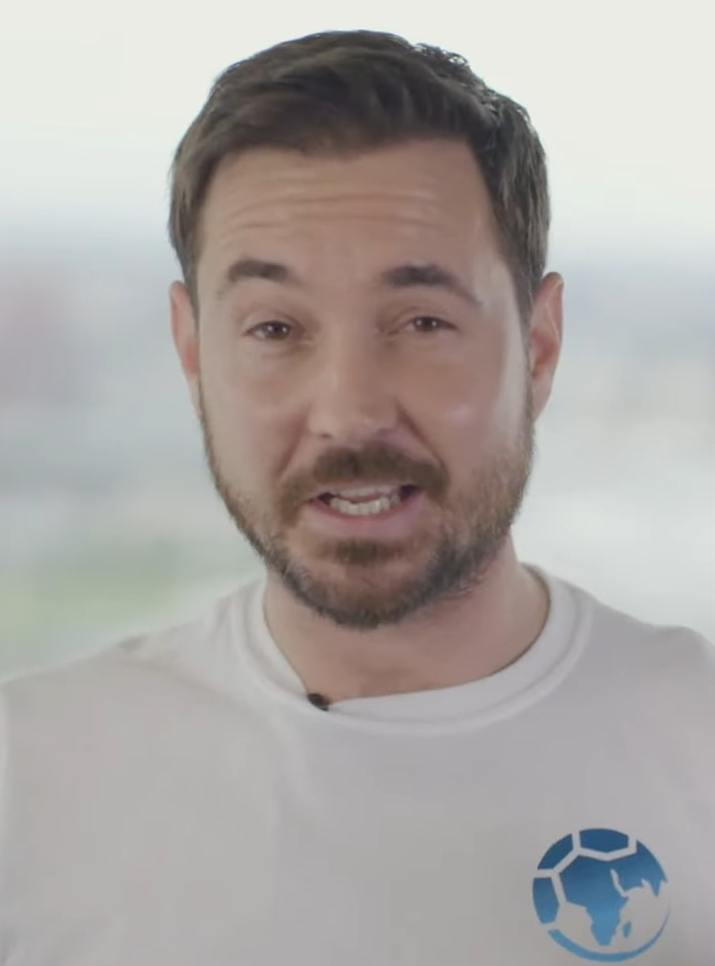
Martin Compston won for Sweet Sixteen (2002).

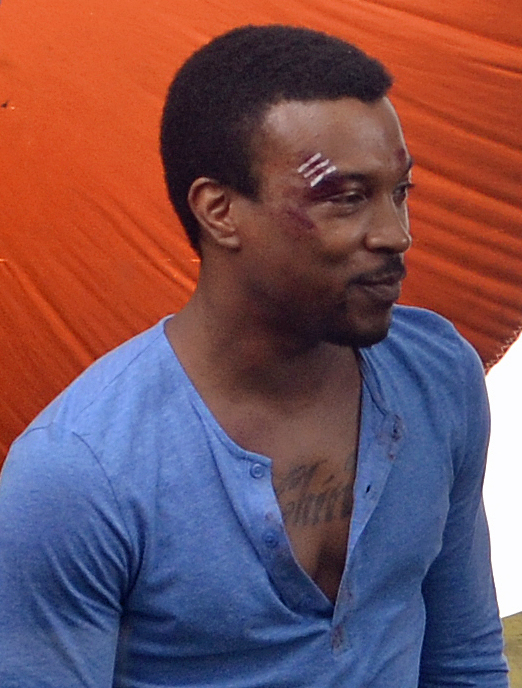
Ashley Walters won for Bullet Boy (2004).

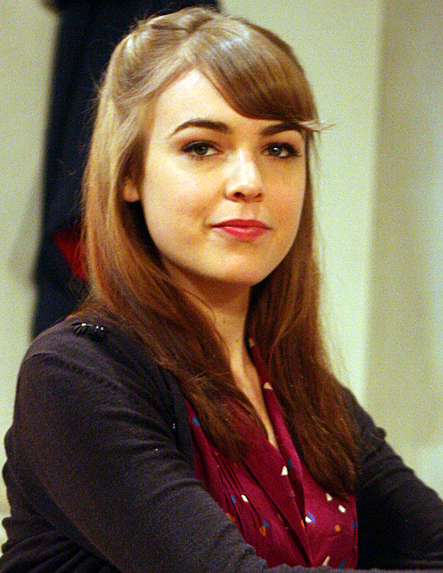
Emily Barclay won for In My Father's Den (2005).

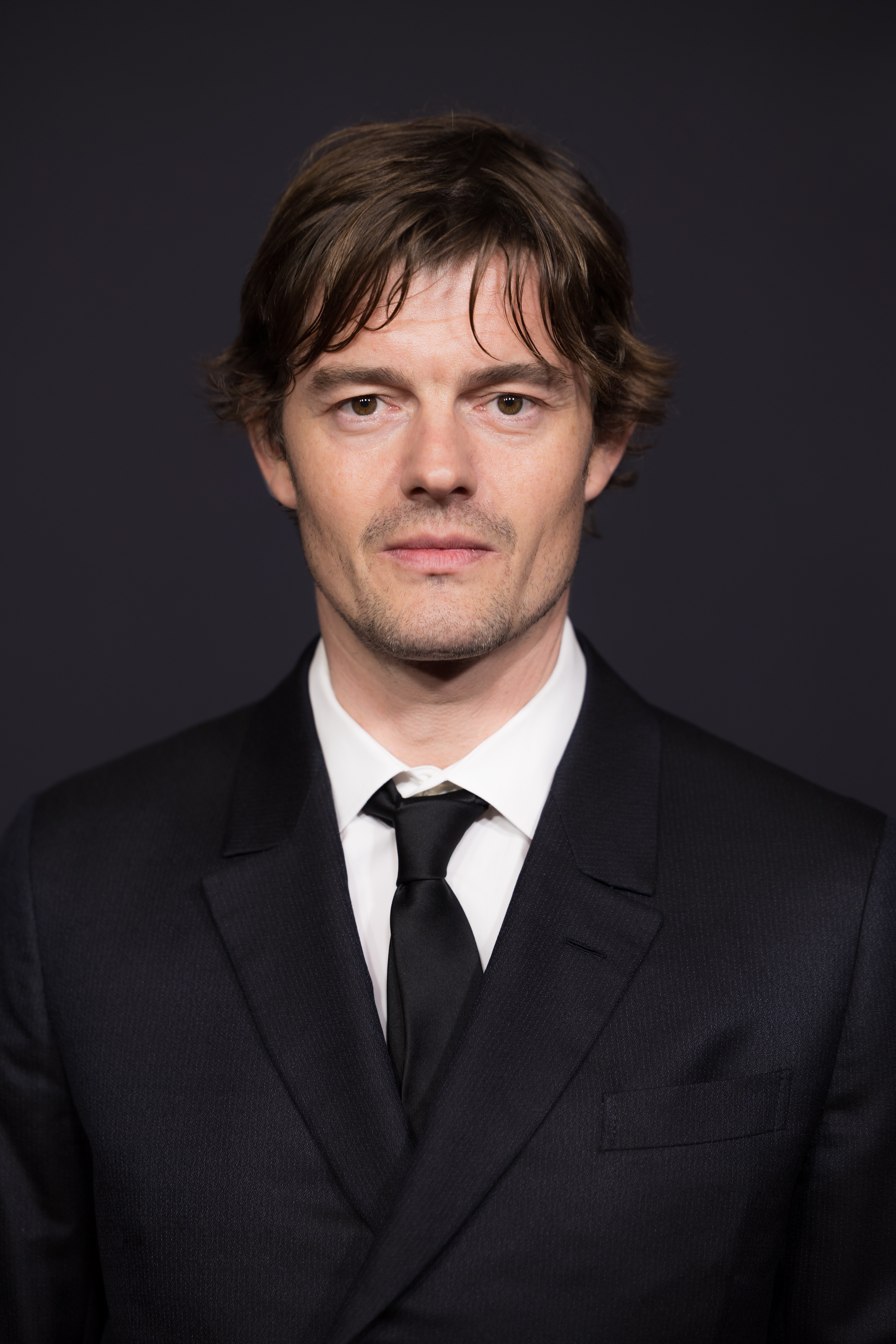
Sam Riley won for Control (2007).

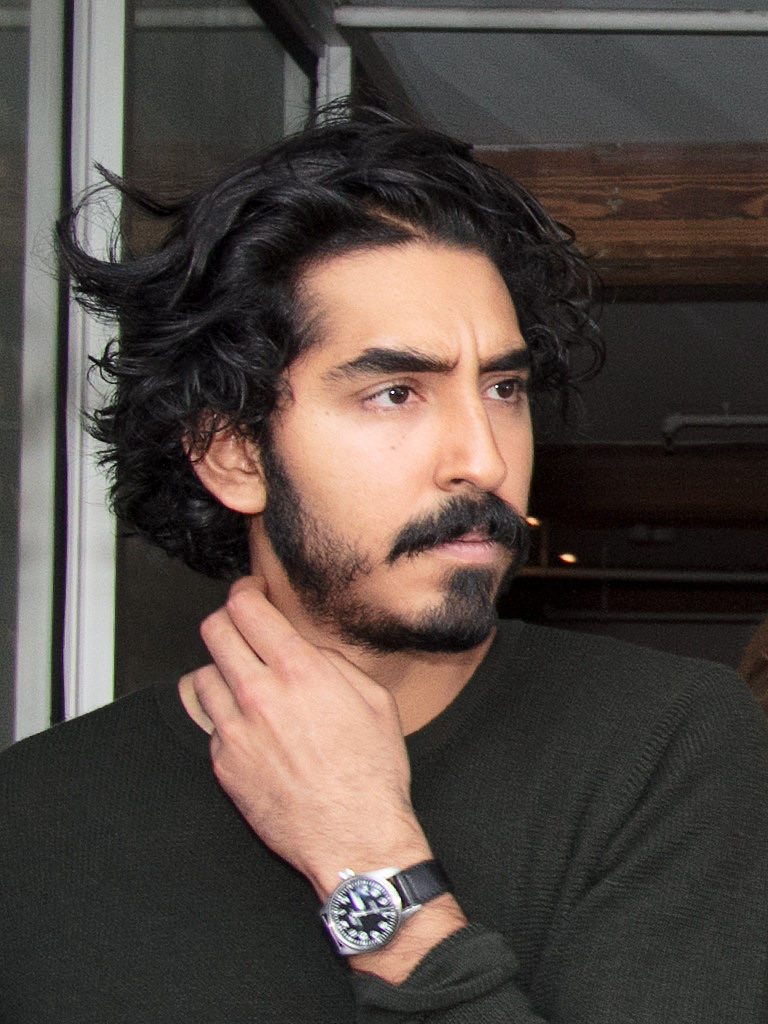
Dev Patel won for Slumdog Millionaire (2008).

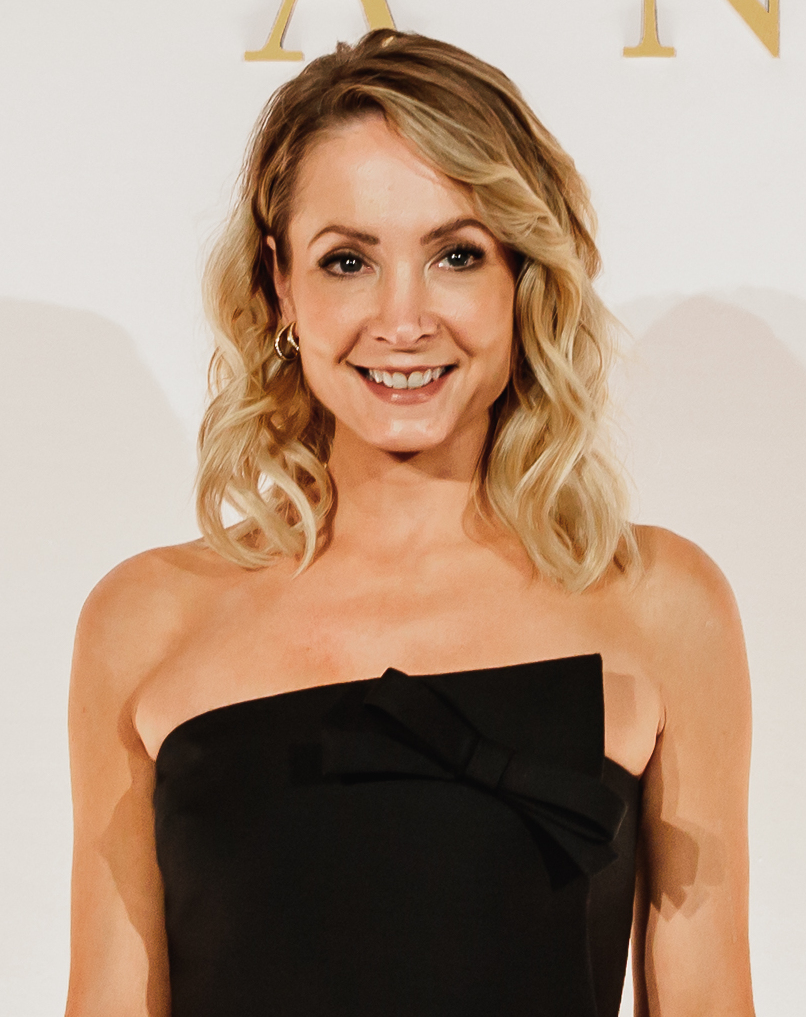
Joanne Froggatt won for In Our Name (2010).

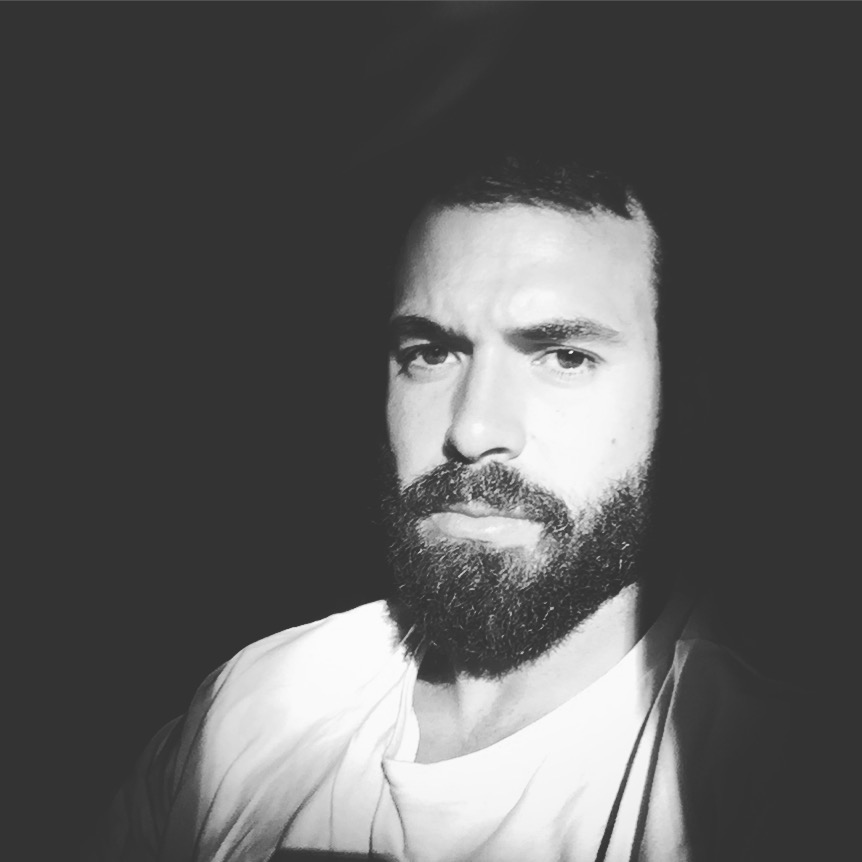
Tom Cullen won for Weekend (2011).

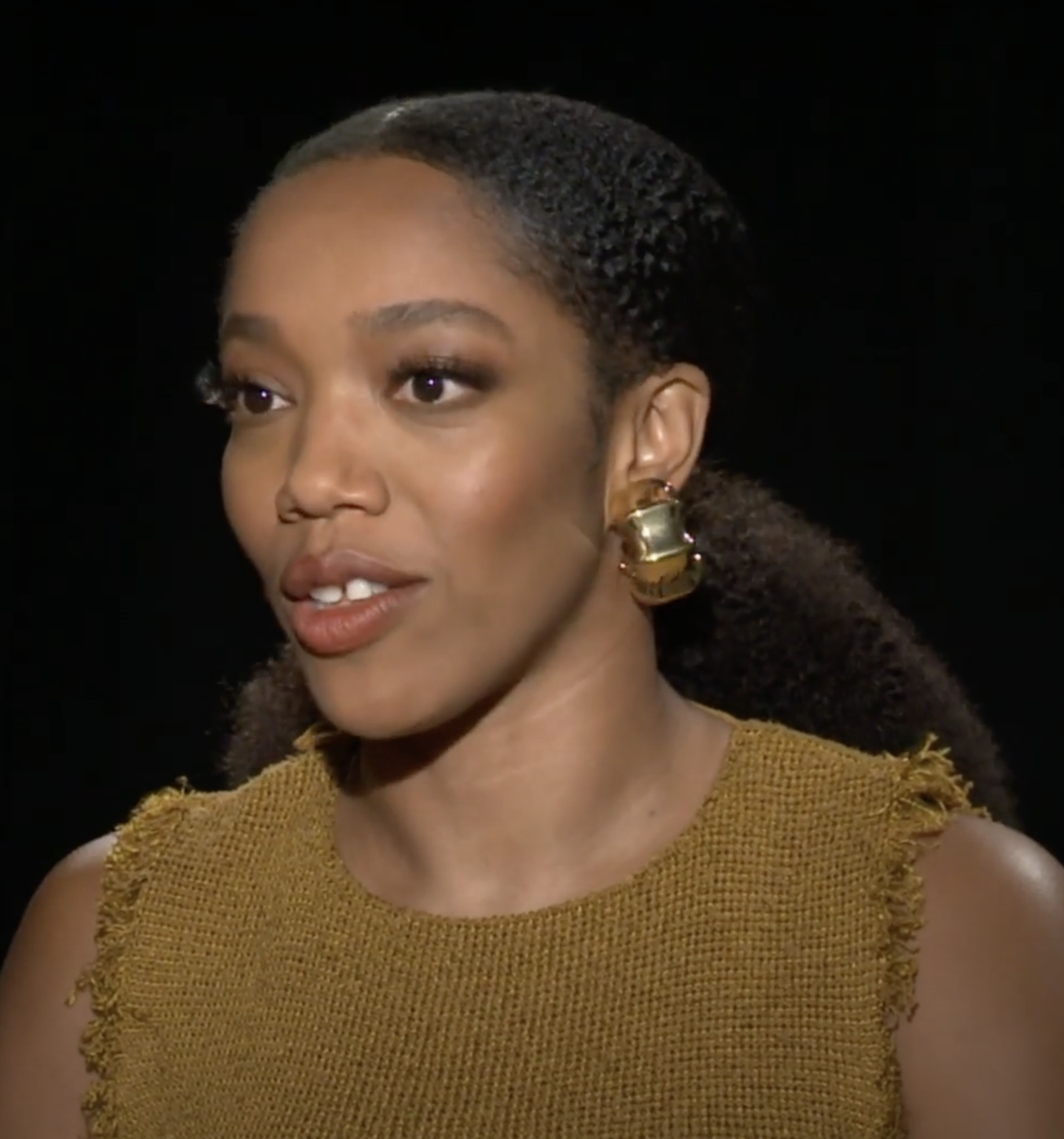
Naomi Ackie won for Lady Macbeth (2017).

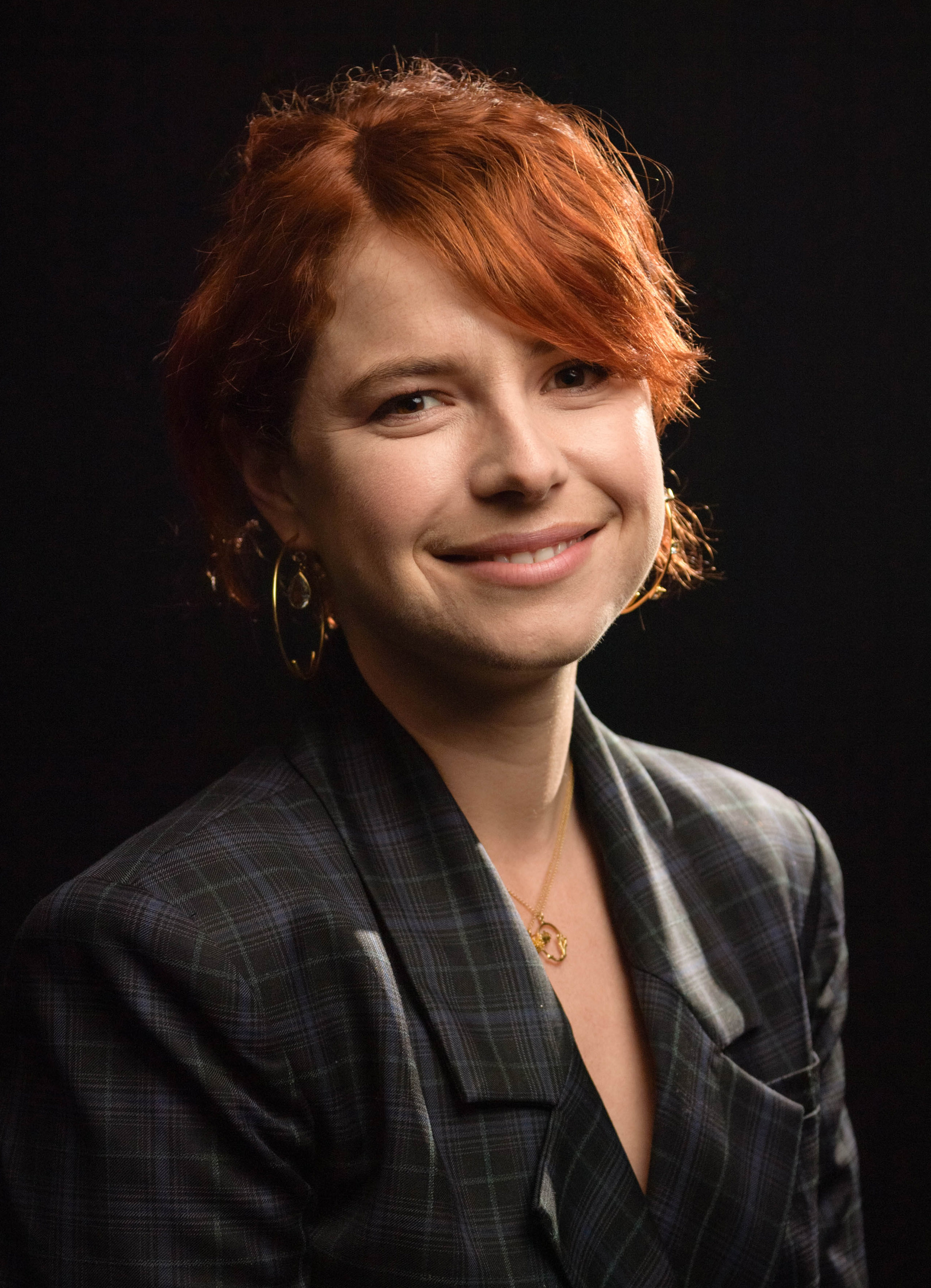
Jessie Buckley won for Beast (2018).

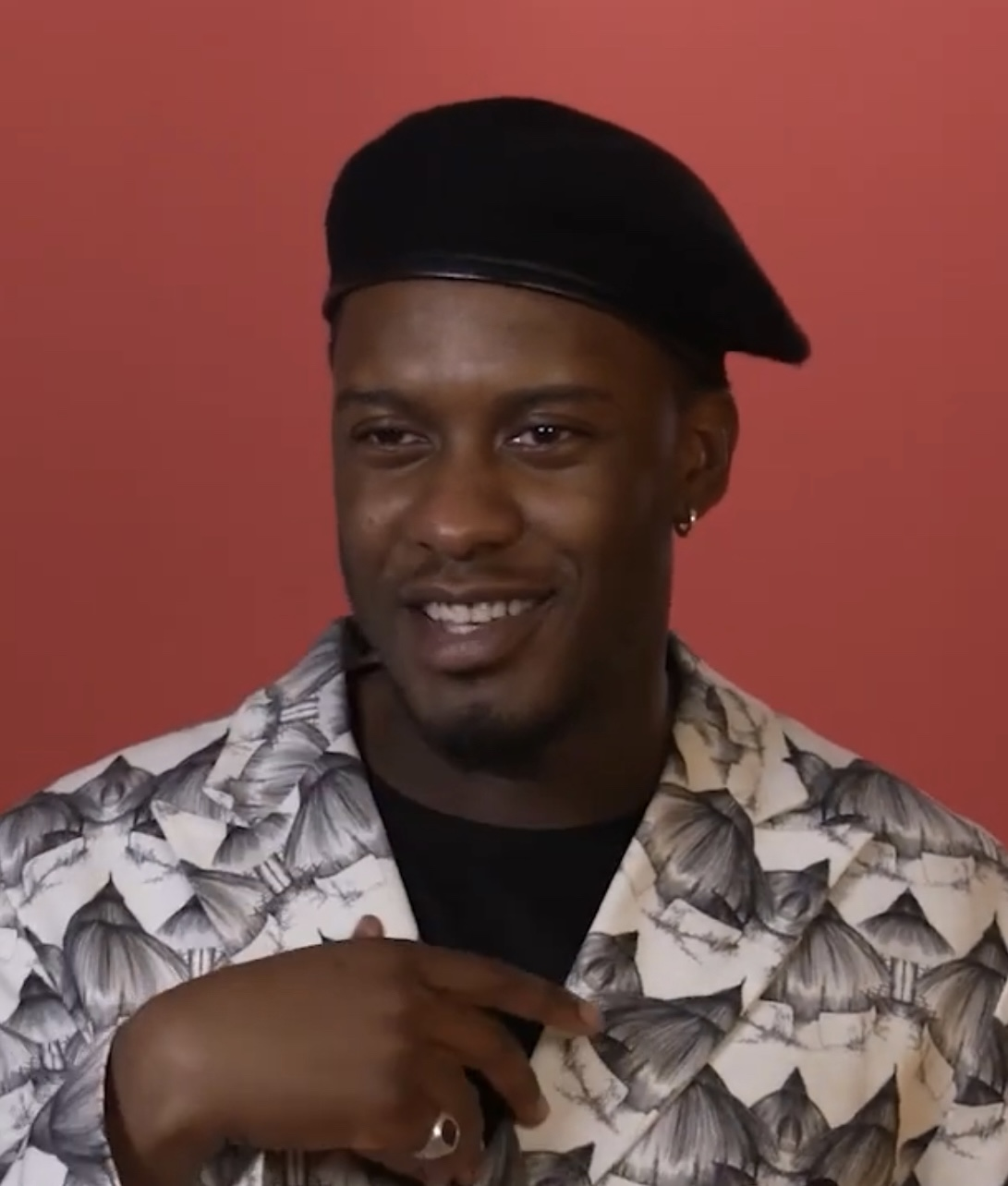
Samuel Adewunmi won for The Last Tree (2019).

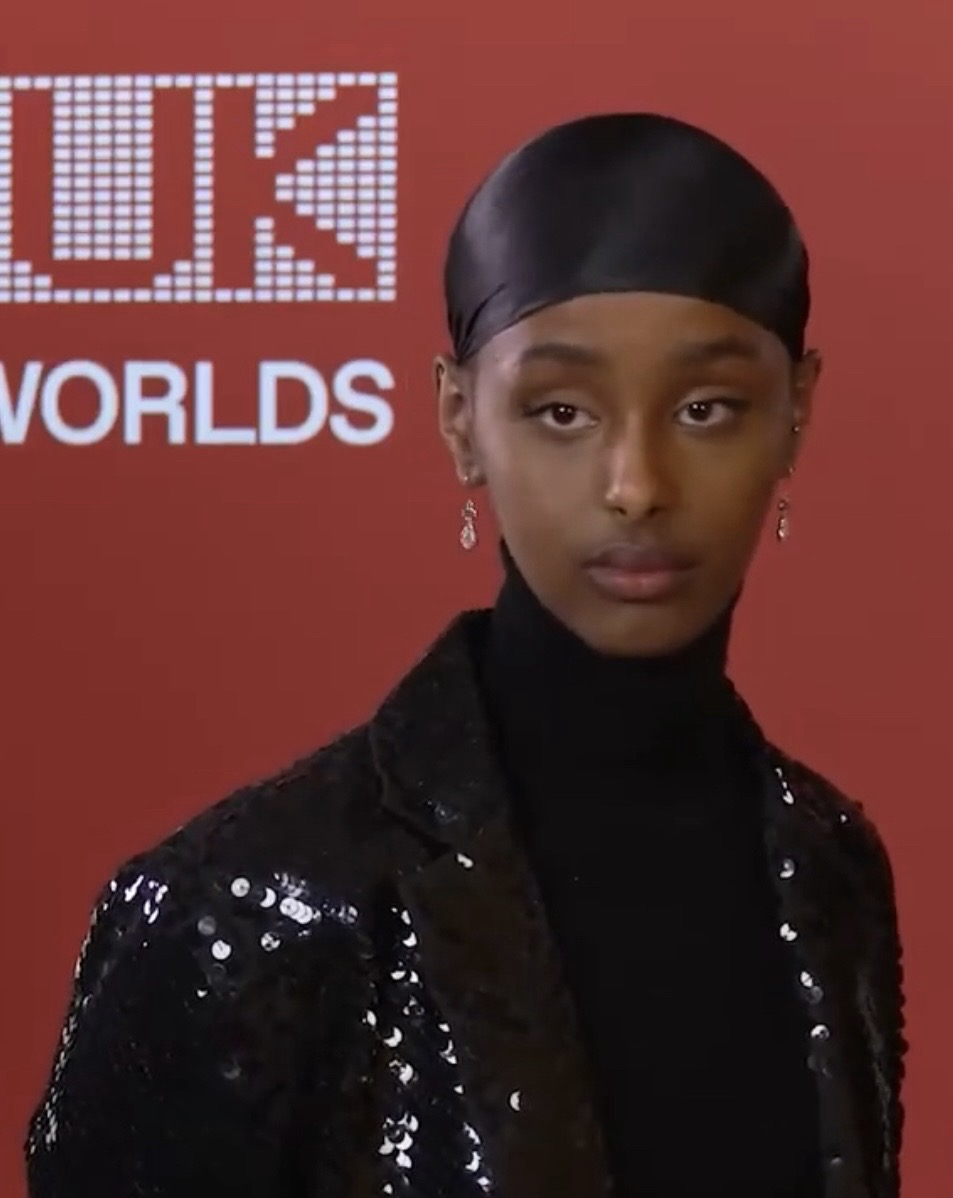
Kosar Ali won for Rocks (2020).

=== 1990s ===
Most Promising Newcomer

Year	Recipient	Film	Character
1998 (1st)	Laila Morse	Nil by Mouth	Janet
1998 (1st)	Enda Hughes (director)	Flying Saucer Rock'n'Roll	
1998 (1st)	James Breese (director)	My Funny Valentine	
1998 (1st)	Jim Pilkington (director)	Pocket	
1998 (1st)	Simon Rumley (writer/director)	Strong Language	
1999 (2nd)	Lara Belmont	The War Zone	Jessie
1999 (2nd)	Keri Arnold	The Darkest Light	Catherine
1999 (2nd)	Simon Bowles (production designer)	Lighthouse	
1999 (2nd)	Alwin H. Küchler (cinematographer)	Ratcatcher	

=== 2000s ===
Best Newcomer (On Screen)

Year	Performer	Film	Character
2000 (3rd)	Jamie Bell	Billy Elliot	Billy Elliot
2000 (3rd)	Neil Fitzmaurice	Going Off Big Time	Mark Clayton
2000 (3rd)	Dina Korzun	Last Resort	Tanya
2000 (3rd)	Chris Beattie	Purely Belter	Gerry McCarten
2000 (3rd)	Greg McLane	Purely Belter	Sewell
2000 (3rd)	Lewis McKenzie	There's Only One Jimmy Grimble	Jimmy Grimble

Best Newcomer (Off Screen)

Year	Recipient	Film
2000 (3rd)	Justine Wright (film editor)	One Day in September
2000 (3rd)	Damian Bromley (cinematographer)	Going Off Big Time
2000 (3rd)	Alison Dominitz (production designer)	Hotel Splendide
2000 (3rd)	Courtney Pine (composer)	It Was an Accident
2000 (3rd)	Igor Jadue-Lillo (cinematographer)	The Low Down

Most Promising Newcomer

Year	Performer	Film	Character
2001 (4th)	Ben Whishaw	My Brother Tom	Tom
2001 (4th)	Natalia Verbeke	Jump Tomorrow	Alicia
2001 (4th)	Ingrid de Souza	Princesa	Fernanda
2001 (4th)	Mark Letheren	South West 9	Mitch
2002 (5th)	Martin Compston	Sweet Sixteen	Liam
2002 (5th)	Parminder Nagra	Bend It Like Beckham	Jesminder "Jess" Kaur Bhamra
2002 (5th)	William Ruane	Sweet Sixteen	Pinball
2002 (5th)	Kathleen McDermott	Morvern Callar	Lanna
2003 (6th)	Harry Eden	Pure	Paul
2003 (6th)	Chiwetel Ejiofor	Dirty Pretty Things	Okwe/Olatokumbo Fadipe
2003 (6th)	Romola Garai	I Capture the Castle	Cassandra Mortmain
2003 (6th)	Jamie Sives	Wilbur Wants to Kill Himself	Wilbur
2004 (7th)	Ashley Walters	Bullet Boy	Ricky
2004 (7th)	Atta Yaqub	Ae Fond Kiss...	Casim Khan
2004 (7th)	Toby Kebbell	Dead Man's Shoes	Anthony
2004 (7th)	Emily Blunt	My Summer of Love	Tamsin
2004 (7th)	Nick Frost	Shaun of the Dead	Ed
2005 (8th)	Emily Barclay	In My Father's Den	Celia
2005 (8th)	Rupert Friend	The Libertine	Billy Downs
2005 (8th)	Samina Awan	Love + Hate	Naseema
2005 (8th)	Alexander Nathan Etel	Millions	Damian Cunningham
2005 (8th)	Thelma Barlow	Mrs Henderson Presents	Lady Margot Conway
2006 (9th)	Thomas Turgoose	This Is England	Shaun Fields
2006 (9th)	Rafi Gavron	Breaking and Entering	Mirsad "Miro" Simić
2006 (9th)	Harry Treadaway, Luke Treadaway	Brothers of the Head	Tom Howe, Barry Howe
2006 (9th)	Dominic Cooper	The History Boys	Stuart Dakin
2006 (9th)	Samuel Barnett	The History Boys	David Posner
2006 (9th)	Jodie Whittaker	Venus	Jessie
2007 (10th)	Sam Riley	Control	Ian Curtis
2007 (10th)	Imogen Poots	28 Weeks Later	Tammy
2007 (10th)	Matthew Beard	And When Did You Last See Your Father?	Blake
2007 (10th)	Bradley Cole	Exhibit A	Andy King
2007 (10th)	Kierston Wareing	It's a Free World...	Angela
2008 (11th)	Dev Patel	Slumdog Millionaire	Jamal Malik
2008 (11th)	Asa Butterfield	The Boy in the Striped Pyjamas	Bruno
2008 (11th)	Ayush Mahesh Khedekar	Slumdog Millionaire	Jamal (toddler)
2008 (11th)	Bill Milner	Son of Rambow	Will Proudfoot
2008 (11th)	Will Poulter	Son of Rambow	Lee Carter
2009 (12th)	Katie Jarvis	Fish Tank	Mia Williams
2009 (12th)	George MacKay	The Boys Are Back	Harry
2009 (12th)	Hilda Péter	Katalin Varga	Katalin Varga
2009 (12th)	Christian McKay	Me and Orson Welles	Orson Welles
2009 (12th)	Edward Hogg	White Lightnin'	Jesco White

=== 2010s ===
Year	Performer	Film	Character
2010 (13th)	Joanne Froggatt	In Our Name	Private Suzy Jackson
2010 (13th)	Manjinder Virk	The Arbor	Lorraine Dunbar
2010 (13th)	Andrea Riseborough	Brighton Rock	Rose
2010 (13th)	Tom Hughes	Cemetery Junction	Bruce Pearson
2010 (13th)	Conor McCarron	Neds	John McGill
2011 (14th)	Tom Cullen	Weekend	Russell
2011 (14th)	Jessica Brown Findlay	Albatross	Emelia
2011 (14th)	John Boyega	Attack the Block	Moses
2011 (14th)	Craig Roberts	Submarine	Oliver Tate
2011 (14th)	Yasmin Paige	Submarine	Jordana Bevan
2012 (15th)	James Floyd	My Brother the Devil	Rashid
2012 (15th)	Paul Brannigan	The Angels' Share	Robbie
2012 (15th)	Eloise Laurence	Broken	Skunk
2012 (15th)	Zawe Ashton	Dreams of a Life	Joyce Carol Vincent
2012 (15th)	Elliot Tittensor	Spike Island	Tits
2013 (16th)	Chloe Pirrie	Shell	Shell
2013 (16th)	Harley Bird	How I Live Now	Piper
2013 (16th)	Caity Lotz	The Machine	Ava/The Machine
2013 (16th)	Jake Macapagal	Metro Manila	Oscar Ramirez
2013 (16th)	Conner Chapman, Shaun Thomas	The Selfish Giant	Arbor, Swifty
2014 (17th)	Sameena Jabeen Ahmed	Catch Me Daddy	Leila
2014 (17th)	Gugu Mbatha-Raw	Belle	Dido Elizabeth Belle
2014 (17th)	Cara Delevingne	The Face of an Angel	Melanie
2014 (17th)	Lliam Walpole	The Goob	"Goob" Taylor
2014 (17th)	Ben Schnetzer	Pride	Mark Ashton
2015 (18th)	Abigail Hardingham	Nina Forever	Holly
2015 (18th)	Milo Parker	Mr Holmes	Roger Munro
2015 (18th)	Bel Powley	A Royal Night Out	Princess Margaret
2015 (18th)	Agyness Deyn	Sunset Song	Chris Guthrie
2015 (18th)	Mia Goth	The Survivalist	Milja
2016 (19th)	Hayley Squires	I, Daniel Blake	Katie Morgan
2016 (19th)	Sennia Nanua	The Girl with All the Gifts	Melanie
2016 (19th)	Dave Johns	I, Daniel Blake	Daniel Blake
2016 (19th)	Steve Brandon	My Feral Heart	Luke
2016 (19th)	Letitia Wright	Urban Hymn	Jamie Harrison
2017 (20th)	Naomi Ackie	Lady Macbeth	Anna
2017 (20th)	Harry Michell	Chubby Funny	Oscar
2017 (20th)	Harry Gilby	Just Charlie	Charlie Lyndsay
2017 (20th)	Cosmo Jarvis	Lady Macbeth	Sebastian
2017 (20th)	Lily Newmark	Pin Cushion	Iona
2018 (21st)	Jessie Buckley	Beast	Moll
2018 (21st)	Molly Wright	Apostasy	Alex
2018 (21st)	Michaela Coel	Been So Long	Simone
2018 (21st)	Liv Hill	Jellyfish	Sarah Taylor
2018 (21st)	Marcus Rutherford	Obey	Leon
2019 (22nd)	Samuel Adewunmi	The Last Tree	Femi
2019 (22nd)	Lorn Macdonald	Beats	Spanner
2019 (22nd)	Vicky Knight	Dirty God	Jade Nugent
2019 (22nd)	Roxanne Scrimshaw	Lynn + Lucy	Lynn
2019 (22nd)	Honor Swinton Byrne	The Souvenir	Julie

=== 2020s ===
Year	Performer	Film	Character
2020 (23rd)	Kosar Ali	Rocks	Sumaya
2020 (23rd)	Niamh Algar	Calm with Horses	Ursula
2020 (23rd)	Conrad Khan	County Lines	Taylor
2020 (23rd)	Frankie Box	Perfect 10	Leigh
2020 (23rd)	Bukky Bakray	Rocks	Olushola "Rocks" Omotoso
2021 (24th)	Nell Barlow	Sweetheart	AJ
2021 (24th)	Lauryn Ajufo	Boiling Point	Andrea
2021 (24th)	Max Harwood	Everybody's Talking About Jamie	Jamie New / Mimi Me
2021 (24th)	Jude Hill	Belfast	Buddy
2021 (24th)	Ellora Torchia	IN THE EⱯRTH	Alma
2022 (25th)	Safia Oakley-Green	Out of Darkness	Beyah
2022 (25th)	Frankie Corio	Aftersun	Sophie
2022 (25th)	Leo Long	I Used to Be Famous	Stevie
2022 (25th)	Kíla Lord Cassidy	The Wonder	Anna O'Donnell
2022 (25th)	Rosy McEwen	Blue Jean	Jean
2023 (26th)	Vivian Oparah	Rye Lane	Yas
2023 (26th)	Le'Shantey Bonsu	Girl	Ama
2023 (26th)	Lola Campbell	Scrapper	Georgie
2023 (26th)	Priya Kansara	Polite Society	Ria Khan
2023 (26th)	Mia McKenna-Bruce	How to Have Sex	Tara
2024 (27th)	Susan Chardy	On Becoming a Guinea Fowl	Shula
2024 (27th)	Nykiya Adams	Bird	Bailey
2024 (27th)	Saura Lightfoot-Leon	Hoard	Maria
2024 (27th)	Ruaridh Mollica	Sebastian	Max Williamson
2024 (27th)	Jason Patel	Unicorns	Aysha
2025 (28th)	Posy Sterling	Lollipop	Molly Brown
2025 (28th)	Scott Ellis Watson	I Swear	Young John Davidson
2025 (28th)	Ebada Hassan	Brides	Doe
2025 (28th)	Safiyya Ingar	Brides	Muna
2025 (28th)	Connor Tompkins	The Son and the Sea	Charlie

== See also ==
- BAFTA Rising Star Award
