= Robert Smyth Academy =

The Robert Smyth Academy
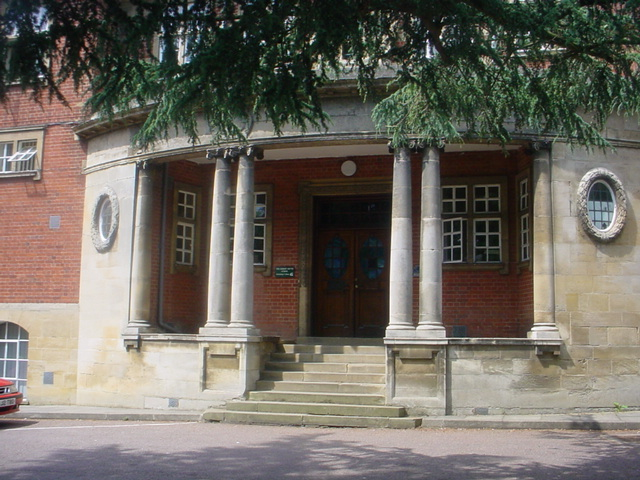

Location
- Burnmill Road; Market Harborough, Leicestershire, LE16 7JG; England; 52°29′11″N 0°55′25″W

Information
- Type: Academy - Converter Mainstream
- Motto: Respect, Succeed, Aspire
- Established: 1607
- Department for Education URN: 137161 Tables
- Ofsted: Reports
- Principal: D. Cleary
- Gender: Mixed-sex education
- Age: 11 to 18
- Enrolment: 1,250
- Website: https://www.robertsmyth.tgacademy.org.uk/

The Robert Smyth Academy is a secondary school in Market Harborough, Leicestershire, England, for 11- to 18-year-olds. It is situated in the north of the town, on Burnmill Road, close to St Luke's Hospital.

== History ==
=== Grammar school ===
Around 1570, Robert Smyth, from the town, walked to London. By 1598, he had become comptroller of the City of London. In 1607 he founded Market Harborough Grammar School. The building still exists in the Market Place. For the first 150 years, it was only open to boys who were of the Anglican faith. In 1909, Leicestershire County Council built a new school, called the County Grammar School of Edward VII, on the present location on Burnmill Road. In 1944, the school fees were stopped and it became known as Market Harborough Grammar School.

=== Comprehensive ===
In 1978, it became Robert Smyth School, and in 2011, it became Robert Smyth Academy

It used to be known as Market Harborough Upper School, being one of the few remaining upper schools in England.

With around 120 staff and 1250 pupils, it provides a comprehensive education for pupils from Year 7 and then into Key Stage 4 (KS4), for GCSE and Post-16 (A-levels). It has been awarded both an Investors in People award and an Artsmark Gold award. In 2006 a successful application was put forward for the school to become a dual status technology/arts college. The catchment area of the school covers Market Harborough and the surrounding villages including Kibworth, Fleckney, Great Glen, King's Norton, Foxton, the Langtons, Gumley, Laughton, Clipston and Lubenham.

The school converted to academy status in September 2011.

In September 2017, the Academy became a member of the Tudor Grange Academies Trust (TGAT).

== Colleges and forms ==
The school consists of four 'colleges', Bragg, Logan, Moseley and Hammond. The houses are named after historical figures from the town. This system promotes a sense of belonging and a means for fun and competition.

== Sixth Form ==
Post-16, or sixth form as it is commonly known, is housed in the 'Sixth Form Centre', a separate building to the lower school, providing a cafeteria on the ground floor with seating, and a computer suite and quiet work areas on the first floor. Sixth form lessons are held throughout the school - the Sixth Form Centre has a few classrooms, but the majority of classes are still taught in the main buildings.

Both sixth form and main school pupils have access to the library, which also contains computers. Lower school pupils have a separate canteen.

== Facilities ==
Other notable facilities of the school are the Main Hall - an assembly hall, in which assemblies are held, as well as concerts, proms and other large-scale events. The Dance studio allows pupils to take part in activities such as Dance and Drama. This has a highly flexible format with space for dancing classes and acting. The Hammond Theatre is also a small intimate space used for small productions and practice performances. All new floodlit Astro Pitch with 2G Sand Based Astro Pitch for Football and Hockey. Full Hockey Pitch 11 v 11 Football and 7 v 7 Football. Two indoor sports centre halls are adjacent to the Astro pitches (in which indoor football, netball, basketball and other sports can be played) There is also a large school field, on which football and rugby are played, The library offers the usual reference facilities plus a thriving lunch time chess club. The school has a number of IT rooms, all networked with internet access and several science labs.

The Sixteen07 canteen opened on 18 February 2011 for Key Stage 3 & 4 students in years 7 to 11. The £1 million facility was built to replace a Nissen hut style structure and contains a kitchen, dining room and training kitchen. Pupils voted for the name of the canteen, selecting 'Sixteen07' in honour of the school's founding date.

Bragg Hall is a large open hall within the main building that has multiple tables and acts as a quiet study area for sixth form pupils, with branching classrooms. The hall has multiple plaques that list names of soldiers that used to attend the school.

== Alumni ==
- Sally Bundock - BBC news presenter
- Matthew Cornwell - Northampton Saints player, Ex Exeter player, Ex Leicester Tigers player and England U21 Captain
- Dan Cole (rugby union) England and Leicester Tigers rugby player. With 118 caps Englands most capped forward.
- Josh Devine - Drummer for One Direction
- Martin Johnson - Former Leicester Tigers rugby player and captain of Englands 2003 world cup winning team. Former manager of the England rugby union team.
- Josh Knight - footballer for Peterborough United
- Andy Peake - Former footballer
- Allison Pearson (née Judith Lobbett) - Daily Mail columnist
- Frances Quinn - winner of The Great British Bake Off
- Ben Smith - Leicestershire and Worcestershire county cricketer and batting coach
- Posy Sterling - actor (Lollipop, Dirty Business)
- Prof Bob White FRS, geophysicist, Professor of Geophysics at the University of Cambridge
- Nina Stibbe -Writer of "Love Nina", "Man at the Helm", "Paradice Lodge" "An Almost Perfect Christmas" & "Reasons to be Cheerful"
- Dylan Fletcher (Sailing) - Gold medalist Tokyo Olympics - Sailing - 49ers

=== Market Harborough Grammar ===
- Sir William Henry Bragg KBE, Nobel prize-winning physicist and inventor of the X-ray spectrometer
- Prof Dame Rosemary Cramp (1940-7), Professor of Archaeology, University of Durham (1971–90)
- Prof Ann-Louise Kinmonth CBE, Professor of General Practice from 1997–2011 at the University of Cambridge, and Professor of Primary Medical Care from 1992–96 at the University of Southampton
- Sqn Ldr Tony Pickering, Battle of Britain pilot
- Sir Edmund Spriggs FRCP
- David Wells, Managing Director of the Service Division from 1993–96 at British Gas
- Marshal of the Royal Air Force Sir Keith Williamson (1939–44) Chief of the Air Staff 1982-85
