= Welland Park Academy =

Coordinates: 52.4745°N 0.9236°W

Location
- Welland Park Road; Market Harborough; Leicestershire, LE16 9DR; England

Information
- Type: Academy
- Local authority: Leicestershire
- Department for Education URN: 137170 Tables
- Ofsted: Reports
- Principal: Pete Leatherland
- Gender: Co-educational
- Age: 11 to 16
- Website: www.wellandparkacademy.co.uk

Welland Park Academy is a co-educational secondary school located in Market Harborough in the English county of Leicestershire for 11-16-year-olds.

It is located on Welland Park Road and like the road, is named after the River Welland by which it was built and the leafy park adjacent.

The catchment area for the academy covers Market Harborough and surrounding villages, including Kibworth, Foxton, The Langtons, Gumley, Laughton, and Lubenham, with many families from Northamptonshire villages also applying for a place. New students attend a thriving summer school.

== History ==
The school was originally known as Welland Park High School, and later Welland Park Community College.

Previously a community school administered by Leicestershire County Council, in August 2011 Welland Park Community College converted to academy status and was renamed Welland Park Academy.

It was formerly a middle school educating pupils aged 11 to 14 but extended its age range to 16 in 2016 becoming a secondary school.

The academy has maintained its autonomy and ability to respond to the needs of its own students by remaining a stand-alone academy, having decided not to join a larger Multi Academy Trust at the time of writing.

== Facilities ==
Facilities are hired by local groups including Market Harborough Youth Theatre, Parnips Theatre Group, Market Harborough Hockey Club, and others.

The school built a new sports hall in May 2023, worth £1.2m, and is used by the community and students regularly.

== Alumni ==
- Martin Johnson, rugby Player
- Andy Peake, footballer
- Posy Sterling, actor
