= The Review Show =

- Also known as: Late Review (1994–2000); Review (2000–01); Newsnight Review (2001–09)
- Starring: Mark Lawson (1994–2005); Kirsty Wark (2002–2014); Martha Kearney (2006–2014)
- Country of origin: United Kingdom
- Original language: English

Production
- Production locations: Studio C, BBC Pacific Quay, Glasgow
- Running time: 55 minutes

Original release
- Network: BBC Two (1994–2013); BBC Four (2013–2014); BBC World News (2013–2014)
- Release: 20 January 1994 – 30 March 2014

Related
- Newsnight

The Review Show is a British discussion programme dedicated to the arts which ran, under several titles, from 20 January 1994 to 30 March 2014. The programme featured a panel of guests who reviewed developments in the world of the arts and culture.

== History ==
The Review Show began as Late Review on 20 January 1994, a strand within The Late Show, an arts magazine which followed the current affairs programme Newsnight, airing on Thursday nights. On 19 March 2000, it moved to a peak time Sunday evening slot within the Art Zone strand, and the title shortened to Review, before moving to Friday nights from 23 February 2001 where the review show was appended to Newsnight, and renamed Newsnight Review.

Newsnight Review was a consumer survey of the week's artistic and cultural highlights which appeared on Friday evening's edition of Newsnight. The programme featured a chair and a panel of three invited guests who would review a selection of books, plays, films and exhibitions. Mark Lawson was the programme's original main presenter from 2001 to December 2005, having previously presented the Late Review and The Late Show strands. Other presenters included Kirsty Wark, Martha Kearney, Tom Sutcliffe, John Wilson, Natalie Haynes, Tim Marlow, Kwame Kwei-Armah and Hardeep Singh Kohli. Regular reviewers included Allison Pearson, Tom Paulin, Tony Parsons, John Carey, Mark Kermode, Ekow Eshun and Germaine Greer.

As part of the BBC's commitment to moving programmes out of London, it was announced in 2009 that Newsnight Review would end and be replaced by The Review Show, produced from Glasgow. The final edition of Newsnight Review was aired with an hour-long special with a review of the year on 18 December 2009. The Review Show was launched on 22 January 2010, with the same producer as Newsnight Review, and following the same format of a chair and a panel of guests (normally three) reviewing the arts, and still presented by Kirsty Wark and Martha Kearney.

As of March 2013 The Review Show was moved to BBC Four and reduced to a monthly, rather than weekly, broadcast. The duration of each episode was increased to an hour.

The final episode of the show was aired on 30 March 2014.
