= Anthony Lane =

British journalist and film critic

- Education: Trinity College, Cambridge
- Occupations: Journalist, film critic
- Partner: Allison Pearson
- Children: 2

Anthony Lane is a British journalist who was a film critic for The New Yorker magazine from 1993 to 2024.

== Career ==
=== Education and early career ===
Lane attended Sherborne School, graduating with a degree in English from Trinity College, Cambridge where he also did graduate work on T.S. Eliot. After graduation, he worked as a freelance writer and book reviewer for The Independent, where he was appointed deputy literary editor in 1989. In 1991, Lane was appointed film critic for The Independent on Sunday.

=== The New Yorker ===
In 1993, Lane was asked by The New Yorker's then-editor, Tina Brown, to join the magazine as a film critic. He has written profiles of actors and directors (Alfred Hitchcock, Buster Keaton, Grace Kelly) and authors (Ian Fleming and Patrick Leigh Fermor) and Hergé's Tintin books. Lane has also reviewed books, such as The Stories of Vladimir Nabokov and The Complete Stories of Evelyn Waugh, two authors he reveres. In 2022, he wrote an essay on the legacy of Eliot's The Waste Land for its centenary. He contributes to the magazine's "Critic at Large" section; in 1999, he wrote about "The Endurance": Shackleton's Legendary Antarctic Expedition at the American Museum of Natural History, and in 2000 he wrote about Full Moon, a collection of lunar photographs at the Rose Center For Earth and Space.

A collection of 140 of his The New Yorker reviews, essays, and profiles was published in 2002 under the title Nobody's Perfect — a reference to the final line of the 1959 film Some Like It Hot. A profile of the film's director, Billy Wilder, ends the book.

== Style ==
=== Lane's maxims ===
In his introduction to Nobody's Perfect: Writings from The New Yorker, Lane mentions five maxims that "should be obeyed by anyone who, having tried and failed to gain respectable employment, has decided to throw in the sponge and become a movie critic instead":

1) Never read the publicity material.
2) Whenever possible, see a film in the company of ordinary human beings.
3) Try to keep up with documentaries about Swabian transsexuals {or, see everything regardless of budget and hype}.
4) Whenever possible, pass sentence on a movie the day after it comes out. Otherwise, wait fifty years.
5) Try to avoid the Lane technique of summer moviegoing.

The explanation for the fifth maxim is a good example of Lane's style:

On a broiling day, I ran to a screening of Contact, the Jodie Foster flick about messages from another galaxy. I made it for the opening credits, and, panting heavily – which, with all due respect, is not something that I find myself doing that often in Jodie Foster films – I started taking notes. These went "v. gloomy", "odd noir look for sci-fi", "creepy shadows in outdoor scene", and so on. Only after three-quarters of an hour did I remember to remove my dark glasses.

Lane varies his style based on his subject. His review of The Prince of Egypt begins with the movie's slogan: "The power is real. The story is forever. The time is now." and continues in a parody of its clipped style: "The time is then. The place is Egypt. The boy is born. The prognostication is dodgy. The answer is bulrushes. The boy is launched. The boy is found. The adoption process is unimpeded by interference from government agencies. The dad is Pharaoh. The brother is Rameses. The stage is set." He goes on: "The picture is O. K. The picture is fine. Look. The thing is this. The cutting-edge computer-generated imagery is white-hot new. The movie is old-fashioned. The story is forever. The movie is for the holidays. The choice is yours." His review of Emma and Kingpin imagines the characters from the former movie discussing the latter: "The company was far from disinclined to hear more; and Mr. Elton, whose refinement of expression was complemented by a most unsullied cordiality, spoke to them of bowling with ten pins; of the misfortune that was visited upon Mr. Harrelson in the losing of his arm; and of the ardent and uncouth intentions on the part of Mr. William Murray to impede the happiness that was both prized and merited by the heroes of the piece." Referring to the poor use of archaisms in Roland Joffé's The Scarlet Letter, he writes "Thou hast to be kidding." His review of The Phantom Menace mentions that "the worst marketing ploy I have seen so far is the Star Wars Learning Fun Book, for kids of kindergarten age. ('What is this? It is a Hutt. Say it out loud: Hutt.') The Phantom Menace raises the spectre of an industry where the parasitic arts of buildup and spinoff will outgrow and choke the product itself." Lane concludes: "What is this? Crap. Say it loud: Crap."

Lane recounts episodes from his life as a filmgoer; he writes that film "has revivified the Proustian principle that memory is not ours to command", adding: "It is generally agreed, for example, that the last Golden Age of cinema occurred in the mid-seventies—the epoch of The Godfather, Chinatown and McCabe and Ms. Miller. I feel privileged to have been there; unfortunately, I spent my pocket money on tickets for Zeppelin, Earthquake, and Rollercoaster (in Sensuround.) I realize that Chinatown is a great picture and that The Towering Inferno is dreck; but the sight of a weary, begrimed Steve McQueen is burned into my mind with a fierceness that Jack Nicholson, with his nicked nostril, can never match. I missed the Golden Age; catching up later was an education, but nothing I can do can bring it back."

Lane's style is often allusive; in a profile of Luis Buñuel, Lane writes that "The great filmmakers, however rare their own appearances in front of the camera, almost always come to resemble their collected works. No one could sit through a Hitchcock season, for example, and imagine that its creator was a carefree and sexually contented beanpole. Godard is the mad professor, beloved of his students and nobody else; Howard Hawks is the sly jock with money and girls to burn; Billy Wilder grins like a miniature devil from the margins of a gilded manuscript—the imp who knows too much. Buñuel beats them hollow: that square sawed-off head, the ripe, amusable mouth, the martial breadth of brow and chin. And, most of all, there are the eyes. Hooded above and pinched below, they shimmer with the virtues, or vices in disguise, of the Buñuelian gaze: dignity, lubricity, and doubt. You can easily picture yourself being hypnotized by this man; sit through a sample of his movies, and you will think you have been."

In a piece reviewing recent bestsellers, Lane, paraphrasing Kingsley Amis, writes that "the ideal literary diet consists of trash and classics: all that has survived, and all that has no reason to survive—books you can read without thinking, and books you have to read if you want to think at all."

== Professional recognition ==
Anthony Lane was awarded the 2001 National Magazine Award for Reviews & Criticism, for three of his New Yorker articles:

- The Maria Problem (14 February 2000), on The Sound of Music
- The Eye of the Land (13 March 2000), on the photographs of Walker Evans
- The Light Side of the Moon (10 April 2000), on photographs from the Apollo program

Lane has also been nominated for National Magazine Awards on a number of other occasions, but has never won one. The nominations include:

- 1996 award for Special Interest, for the article Look Back in Hunger (18 December), a humorous piece about cookbooks
- 2000 award for Reviews & Criticism, for the articles
  - The Man in the Mirror (9 August 1999), on André Gide
  - In Love with Fear (16 August 1999), on Alfred Hitchcock
  - Waugh in Pieces (4 October 1999), on Evelyn Waugh

Nicholas Lezard, reviewing Lane's collection Nobody's Perfect, wrote that "If the film is good art, or a delight, Lane will communicate precisely, concisely and illuminatingly the relevant merits; if the film sucks, he has some fun." Laura Miller, reviewing that collection in The New York Times, wrote that "Lane writes prose the way Fred Astaire danced; his sentences and paragraphs are a sublime, rhythmic concoction of glide and snap, lightness and sting. Like his beloved Jane Austen, his style is infernally contagious." However, she expressed reservations about his use of puns. In 2008, Lane was named one of the top 30 critics in the world by More Intelligent Life, the web version of the lifestyle publication from The Economist. As of 2010, the movie review aggregation website Metacritic weighted Lane's movie reviews higher than any other critic's.

== Personal life ==
Lane used to live in Cambridge, England, with his former partner, Allison Pearson, a British writer and columnist.
