= Tom McKay (actor) =

English actor (born 1979)

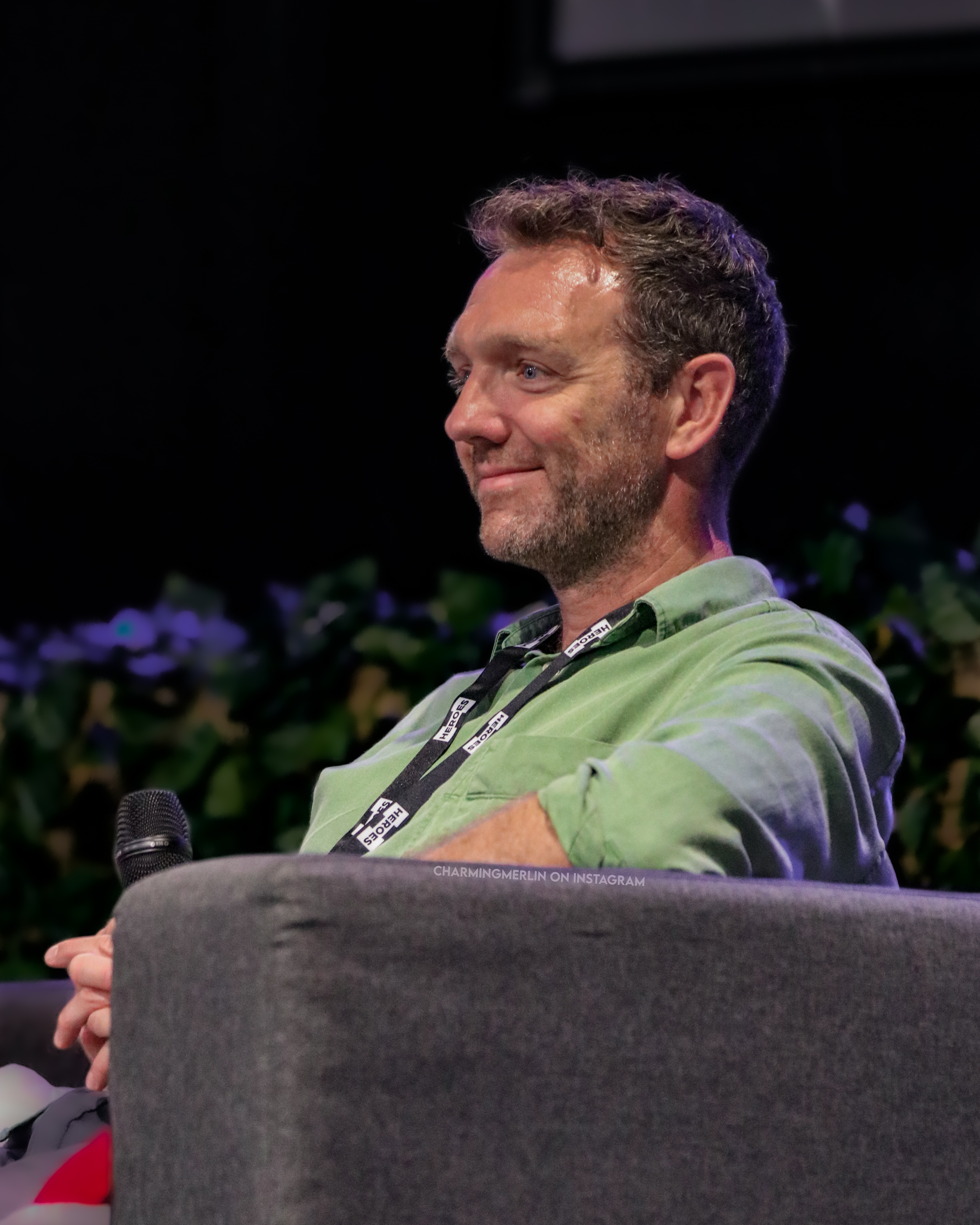
- McKay in 2025
- Born: 27 December 1979 (age 46); Solihull, Warwickshire, England
- Education: London Academy of Music and Dramatic Art
- Occupation: Actor
- Years active: 2001 – present

Tom McKay (born 27 December 1979) is an English actor. He trained at LAMDA and spent the early part of his career working predominantly in theatre, performing for the Royal Shakespeare Company, and at the National Theatre, Almeida, Royal Court, Donmar Warehouse, the Globe, in the West End and at the Public Theater in New York.

He went on to work more frequently in television, including lead roles in History Channel's Emmy-winning series Hatfields and McCoys, the BBC's acclaimed costume drama The White Queen, and more recently his portrayal of Mark Preen in the Channel 4 docudrama Dirty Business.

He is known for his role as Henry of Skalitz in Warhorse Studios’s medieval RPG, Kingdom Come: Deliverance and Kingdom Come: Deliverance II, for which he’s received nominations, including a Golden Joystick Awards Nomination for Best Performer and a BAFTA Game Award Nomination for Best Lead Performance.

== Early life and education ==
Thomas McKay was born in Solihull, Warwickshire on the 27th December 1979. He graduated from the London Academy of Music and Dramatic Art in 2001 and got his first job the day he graduated at the National Theatre playing China Mary in Mother Clap's Molly House.

== Career ==
Following his training at LAMDA, McKay has been in numerous theatre performances, including many Shakespeare productions. Notably he played the role of Brutus in Shakespeare's Julius Caesar, which was performed at the Shakespeare's Globe in 2014, directed by Dominic Dromgoole. His first job was at the National Theatre in Mark Ravenhill's Mother Clap's Molly House, directed by Sir Nicholas Hytner.

Other roles include the Duke of Gloucester and the Lord Scrope of Masham in Henry V at the National Theatre, also directed by Hytner, and Lennox in Macbeth at the Almeida Theatre directed by John Caird. In 2010 he played various roles in The Great Game: Afghanistan in the US, directed by the current Artistic Director of the National Theatre, Indhu Rubasingham, and Nicolas Kent. At the Gielgud Theatre in 2006 he performed as Jim Reston in Frost/Nixon directed by Michael Grandage. Most recently he played Arnholm in Ibsen's The Lady From the Sea at the Donmar Warehouse directed by Kwame Kwei-Armah.

In 2005, McKay played the role of Piers as part of an ensemble cast in the film Chromophobia, starring Ralph Fiennes and directed by Fiennes' sister, Martha. In the same year he appeared in Imagine Me & You, and in the docudrama I Shouldn't Be Alive for one episode where he played Jim, a young parent trapped in a blizzard with a five month old child.

Since 2006 he has appeared in many long running British TV shows, including the likes of Casualty, Silent Witness, Doctors, Waterloo Road, Spooks, New Tricks, and Endeavour. In 2007 he appeared in the British feature film The Feral Generation directed by Andrew Jones, which won Best Feature Film - UK at the Swansea Film Festival in 2008. In 2009 he featured in an episode of TV show Primeval, and in the third installation of the Wrong Turn Franchise, Wrong Turn 3: Left For Dead.

In 2012 he played Jim McCoy in Hatfields & MCoys, an American TV mini series about the Hatfield-McCoy feud. The show won five Primetime Emmy Awards. In 2013 McKay adopted the role of Jasper Tudor in the highly regarded historical drama series The White Queen. The show was nominated for three Golden Globe Awards, four Primetime Emmy Awards, and a People's Choice Award.

In 2016, McKay got the role to play Henry of Skalitz in the Kickstarter-funded video game Kingdom Come: Deliverance, set in 15th Century Bohemia. The voice and motion capture role took two years to complete before the game's release in 2018.

In 2020 he appeared in the TV show Devils, and reprised the role of Chris Bailey in 2022 for the second season. In 2022 he appeared as Max Kelly in the British thriller series The Undeclared War, and returned for the second season which aired in July 2026.

Also in 2022 McKay played the role of DJ in ITV's The Suspect starring Aidan Turner, based on the book of the same name by Michael Robotham. In 2024 he featured in the Brazilian biographical drama miniseries based on the life of racing driver Ayrton Senna. He played the role of Alex Hawkridge, Senna's team boss at Toleman.

In 2025, the sequel Kingdom Come: Deliverance II was released, which saw McKay reprise his role as Henry of Skalitz. He recorded 508 hours of dialogue for the role across 127 sessions. He received a Golden Joystick Awards Nomination for Best Performer and a BAFTA Game Award Nomination for Best Lead Performance. At the 22nd BAFTA Game Awards, Warhorse Studios won Best Narrative for the game.

In his most recent role, McKay plays Mark Preen in Channel 4's Dirty Business. The series covers a decade-long investigation on sewage-contaminated water in Oxfordshire. In 1999 the Preen family lost their eight year old daughter due to E-coli poisoning. Following the release of the show campaign group Surfers Against Sewage have launched a new petition to put pressure on the government to put public health above profit. The Guardian praised the show, stating "If this doesn't incite righteous anger over our filthy water then nothing will."

== Acting credits ==
=== Film ===
Year	Title	Role	Notes
2005	Chromophobia	Piers	
2005	Imagine Me & You	Michael 2	
2007	Joe's Palace	Uncredited	TV film
2007	The Feral Generation	Crackhead	
2008	Clubbed	Skank	
2008	The Shooting of Thomas Hurndall	Rueben	TV film
2009	Wrong Turn 3: Left for Dead	Brandon	
2012	I Think, Therefore	Gary	Short film
2014	Globe on Screen: Julius Caesar	Brutus	
2014	The Lost Legion	Taranis Maldras	
2016	Granate	Architect	Short film
2016	Kill Command	Robert Cutbill	
2016	The Harrow	Miller Lee	
2021	The Interrogation of Rudolf Hess	Rudolf Hess	Short film
2024	Touchdown	Henry Newton MP	

=== Television ===
Year	Title	Role	Notes
2005	I Shouldn't Be Alive	Jim	Season 1 episode 2 "Lost In The Snow"
2006	Casualty	Alan Curren	Season 20 episode 42 "Needle"
2007	Silent Witness	DS Jimmy Case	Season 11 episode 3 "Suffer the Children: Part 1"; Season 11 episode 4 "Suffer the Children: Part 2"
2008	Casualty	Mike	Season 23 episode 9 "The Line of Fire"
2009	Doctors	Frankie Mellors	Season 10 episode 215 "Cows"
2009	Primeval	Joe	Season 3 wpisode 9 "Herd Logic"
2010	Waterloo Road	Mark Moran	Season 5 episode 12 "#5.12"
2010	Spooks	Saul De Vries	Season 9 episode 2 "#9.2"
2010	New Tricks	Jason Bishop	Season 7 episode 5 "Good Morning Lemmings"
2010	The Little House	Ruth's Father	
2012	Hatfields & McCoys	Jim McCoy	TV miniseries
2013	The White Queen	Jasper Tudor	Season 1 episodes 2–5, 6 (voice only), 8–10
2014	The Transporter: The Series	Jeremy Donne	Season 2 episode 7 "Sex, Lies and Videotape"
2015	The Bastard Executioner	Gruffud's Aide/Rhys	Season 1 episode 6 "Thorns/Drain"; Season 1 episode 10 "Blood and Quiescence/Crau a Chwsg"
2016	Endeavour	Cole Matthews	Season 3 episode 4 "Coda"
2020–2022	Devils	Chris Bailey	Main cast
2020	Moving On	Joe Kelly	Season 11 episode 1 "Time Out"
2022–present	The Undeclared War	Max Kelly	Season 1 episodes 1–5 Season 2 episodes 1–2, 4–6
2022	The Suspect	DJ	Season 1 episodes 2–5
2023	Black Cake	Bossman	Season 1 episode 3 "Eleanor"
2024	Ellis	Eric Mercer	Season 1 episode 1 "Hanmore"
2024	Senna	Alex Hawkridge	Season 1 episode 2 "Belonging"; Season 1 Episode 3 "Ambition"
2026	Dirty Business	Mark Preen	Episodes 1–2

=== Theatre ===
Year	Title	Role	Theatre/company	Notes
1993–1994	Macbeth	Fleance	Royal Shakespeare Company	Barbican Theatre in 1993, moved to Stratford in 1994
1995	Lord of the Flies	Roger	Royal Shakespeare Company	
1997	Romeo and Juliet	Romeo	Playbox Theatre	
1997	Edmund Ironside	Alfred	Royal Shakespeare Company (Fringe Festival)	
1998	Kissing Angels	Romeo	National Youth Theatre	
1999	Coriolanus	Coriolanus	London Academy of Music and Dramatic Art	
2000	Today	Victor	London Academy of Music and Dramatic Art	
2000	Romeo and Juliet	Romeo	London Academy of Music & Dramatic Art	
2000	Mother Clap's Molly House	Phil	London Academy of Music & Dramatic Art	
2001	Mother Clap's Molly House	China Mary	Royal National Theatre	
2002	Mother Clap's Molly House	Thomas Orme/Josh	Aldwych Theatre	
2002	Elizabeth Rex	Tom Travis	Birmingham Repertory	
2003	Simplicity	William	Richmond Orange Tree	
2003	Henry V	Duke of Gloucester; Lord Scrope of Masham	Royal National Theatre	
2004	Shakespeare's R & J	Romeo	Theatre Royal Bath Tour	
2005	The Arab Israeli Cookbook	Fadi/Daniel	The Gate Theatre	
2005	Macbeth	Lennox	Almeida Theatre	
2005	Gladiator Games	Robert Stewart	Sheffield Crucible and Stratford East	
2006	On The Third Day	Robbie	Ambassadors Theatre	
2006	Frost/Nixon	Jim Reston	Gielgud Theatre	Donmar Warehouse West End
2007	The Final Shot	Michael Fine	Theatre 503	
2008	The Herbal Bed	Rafe Smith	Salisbury Playhouse	
2010	Rough Cuts	Unknown	Royal Court Theatre	
2010	Greta Garbo Came to Donegal	Harry Caulfield	Tricycle Theatre	
2010	The Great Game: Afghanistan	Dickenson, James Kite, 1st Deputy, Graham, Sergant Jay Watkins	Tricycle Theatre	Tricycle Theatre/U.S Tour/Public Theatre NYC
2013	A Midsummer Night's Dream	Oberon	The Lamb Players	
2014	Julius Caesar	Brutus	Shakespeare's Globe Theatre	
2016	Dedication	William Shakespeare	Nuffield Theatre	
2016	Drones, Baby, Drones	Doug/Pete	Arcola Theatre	
2017	The Lady From The Sea	Arnholm	Donmar Warehouse	

=== Video games ===
Year	Title	Role	Notes
2009	Venetica	Various	NPC roles
2018	Kingdom Come: Deliverance	Henry of Skalitz	Main character, voice (English version) and motion capture
2025	Kingdom Come: Deliverance II	Henry of Skalitz	Main character, voice (English version) and performance capture

=== Other media ===
Year	Title	Role	Notes
2003	Britain's Finest	Himself	TV series
2006	The Sunday Programme	Henry V	TV series
2006	The Play's The Thing	Himself	TV series
2015	Supreme Tweeter	Himself	YouTube series
2026	Oaths & Empires	Solus	Podcast
