= Playing Nice =

British television series

- Genre: Drama; Thriller
- Created by: Grace Ofori-Attah
- Based on: Playing Nice by JP Delaney
- Written by: Grace Ofori-Attah
- Directed by: Kate Hewitt
- Starring: James Norton; Niamh Algar; James McArdle; Jessica Brown Findlay
- Composer: Clint Mansell
- Country of origin: United Kingdom
- Original language: English
- No. of series: 1
- No. of episodes: 4

Production
- Executive producers: Kitty Kaletsky; James Norton; Kate Crowe; Joe Naftalin; Isobel Carter; Grace Ofori-Attah; JP Delaney
- Producer: Nick Pitt
- Running time: 50 minutes
- Production companies: StudioCanal; Rabbit Track Pictures

Original release
- Network: ITV
- Release: 5 January – 13 January 2025

Playing Nice is a 2025 British thriller drama miniseries for ITV, based on the novel of the same name by J. P. Delaney. James Norton stars and executive-produces via his production company Rabbit Track Pictures. Kate Hewitt directs from an adaptation by Grace Ofori-Attah.

== Synopsis ==
When two couples discover their toddler sons were switched at birth, they struggle with the choice whether to keep the sons they have raised, or to reclaim their biological child.

== Cast ==
- James Norton as Pete Riley
- Niamh Algar as Maddie Wilson
- James McArdle as Miles Lambert
- Jessica Brown Findlay as Lucy Lambert
- Posy Sterling as Kiera

== Production ==
Ofori-Attah adapted the book Playing Nice by JP Delaney. It was produced by StudioCanal and Rabbit Track Pictures. Norton stars and is also an executive producer. Algar had previously starred in Ofori-Attah's medical thriller Malpractice.

=== Filming ===
The production got underway in Cornwall in November 2023. Filming locations included St Ives and Padstow, as well as Mawgan Porth beach and Park Head, Cornwall and lasted into early 2024.

== Episodes ==
No.	Episode	Directed by	Written by	Original release date	UK viewers (millions)
1	1	Kate Hewitt	Grace Ofori-Attah	5 January 2025	N/A
2	2	TBA	Grace Ofori-Attah	TBA	TBD
3	3	TBA	Grace Ofori-Attah	TBA	TBD
4	4	Unknown	Grace Ofori-Attah	13 January 2025	N/A

== Broadcast ==
The series was broadcast on ITV and its accompanying streaming / catch up service ITVX beginning on 5 January 2025. The series became ITVX's best-ever drama launch on the service at the time of airing, as well as ITV1's highest-rated new drama of 2025.

== Reception ==
On the review aggregator website Rotten Tomatoes, 60% of 15 critics' reviews are positive.

Anita Singh, for The Telegraph, reviewed the series positively, claiming a "child-swap thriller doesn’t need to be believable to be addictive". Writing for Digital Spy, Janet A Leigh rated the series 5 stars, describing it as “the kind of show that will plague your mind in an infuriating, all-consuming, perfectly addictive way.” However, Rachel Aroesti, writing for The Guardian, labelled the show "mind-bendingly bad" conclusively describing it as "the worst of modern television: a witless mystery overly reliant on insidious ambience and really nice houses".
