= Allison Pearson =

Welsh columnist and author (born 1960)

- Born: Judith Allison Lobbett; 22 July 1960 (age 66); Carmarthen, Wales
- Education: Market Harborough Upper School; Lincoln Christ's Hospital School; Clare College, Cambridge
- Employer: The Daily Telegraph
- Spouse: Simon Pearson (m. 1988)
- Allison Pearson talks about I Think I Love You on Bookbits radio

Judith Allison Pearson (née Lobbett; born 22 July 1960) is a Welsh columnist and author. Pearson has worked for British newspapers such as the Daily Mail, The Independent, the Evening Standard, The Daily Telegraph, and the Financial Times. She has also worked as a presenter for Channel 4 and BBC Radio 4. Pearson's chick lit novel was published in 2002; a film adaptation with the same title, I Don't Know How She Does It, was released in 2011.

Pearson campaigned in favour of Brexit and in 2016 described Brussels as the jihadist capital of Europe. She has criticised the Gender Recognition Act 2004, and opposed transgender rights, describing them as "the evil trans ideology".

== Early life ==
Born in Carmarthen and initially raised speaking Welsh, Pearson moved to Burry Port, Carmarthenshire as a young child. She lived in Leicestershire, and attended Market Harborough Upper School (now Robert Smyth School). Her family moved to Washdyke Lane in Nettleham, where she attended Lincoln Christ's Hospital School, and won a prize for history in the sixth form; she gained A-levels in English, history and French.

She studied English at Clare College, Cambridge, graduating with a lower second class degree (2:2).

== Career ==
=== Journalism ===
Pearson began her career with the Financial Times, where she was a sub-editor, before moving to The Independent and then The Independent on Sunday in 1992. There, she was assistant to Blake Morrison before becoming a television critic, winning the award for Critic of the Year at the British Press Awards in 1993.

Pearson was a columnist with London's Evening Standard and The Daily Telegraph, then took over from Lynda Lee-Potter at the Daily Mail. Pearson ended her column for the Daily Mail in April 2010, when it was said that she was to join The Daily Telegraph. In September 2010, Pearson resumed her role as a columnist with The Daily Telegraph, where she was also the chief interviewer. Following the acquisition of the Telegraph by Axel Springer SE, she was reported to be leaving.

Pearson has presented Channel 4's J'Accuse and BBC Radio 4's The Copysnatchers. She participated as a panellist on Late Review, the predecessor of Newsnight Review.

Pearson is on the Media/PR Advisory Council of Toby Young's Free Speech Union.

==== Police investigation ====
In November 2024, Pearson was visited at home by Essex Police asking her to undergo a voluntary interview after a complaint that she had incited racial hatred with a tweet posted in November 2023. During a period of scrutiny on British policing of pro-Palestinian protests during the Gaza war, Pearson had posted a photo of Greater Manchester Police officers standing besides supporters of former Pakistani Prime Minister Imran Khan's Pakistan Tehreek-e-Insaf party waving the party's flag. However, despite the flag including the word "Pakistan", she called the flagbearers "Jew haters" and misidentified the officers as Metropolitan Police officers, citing an incident where that service had not met with an Israeli-advocacy group. These errors were corrected by a Community Note and Pearson deleted the tweet.

After the visit, Pearson wrote a Telegraph column criticising the incident and saying that the police had said it was a non-crime hate incident. Essex Police reported The Daily Telegraph to the Independent Press Standards Organisation, saying that it had body camera footage proving that they had never said it was a non-crime hate incident. IPSO, however, rejected the complaint, declaring that The Telegraph had taken sufficient care to establish the facts before publication.

Mark Hobrough of the National Police Chiefs' Council conducted a review of the action of Essex police at their request, and concluded that it was correct for the police to investigate the matter; the report said of one of the officers who visited Pearson: "Our view was that the officer's behaviour during this interaction was exemplary."

In 2026 Pearson brought a defamation claim against Essex Police and Roger Hirst, the police and crime commissioner for Essex, claiming they made statements which falsely implied she had committed a crime. Judge Martin Chamberlain ruled on 24 April that her claim could proceed to trial. In July 2026, Pearson won her case against Hirst, was awarded damages, and received a public apology from him.

=== Books ===
Pearson's first novel, I Don't Know How She Does It (2002), was a "chick lit" novel which examined the pressures of modern motherhood. The book was a bestseller in the UK and the US, selling four million copies, and was made into a film.

Pearson was sued by Miramax for non-delivery of a second novel, I Think I Love You, for which she received a US$700,000 advance in 2003. Delivery was due in 2005: it was published in 2010. The novel was about a teenager's passion for David Cassidy in the 1970s and the man writing the so-called replies from David Cassidy to the teenage fans, who meet up 20 years later after marriage, divorce, and children. The Daily Telegraph praised the novel for its warmth and sincerity; however, The Guardian described it as an "unrealistic and sappy romance".

A sequel to I Don't Know How She Does It was published in September 2017. The novel, How Hard Can It Be, continues the story of the protagonist Kate Reddy, now approaching 50 and struggling with bias against older women in the workplace. The book attracted considerable publicity, but was not a bestseller.

== Views ==
=== Islamic terrorism ===
Shortly after the first of the 22 March 2016 Belgian bombings, Pearson suggested that the attacks were a justification for the Brexit cause in the then-upcoming referendum on Britain's membership of the European Union, writing on Twitter that "Brussels, de facto capital of the EU, is also the jihadist capital of Europe. And the Remainers dare to say we're safer in the EU!" Her tweet was criticised by Kay Burley and The Guardian columnist Owen Jones.

=== Transgender issues ===
Pearson views transgender identity as "an evil trans ideology" and that "Organisations that should know better have allowed themselves to be infiltrated by a warped ideology that dares to call the fundamental truths of biological science lies".

Writing for the Telegraph about the NHS's decision to log their patient's sexual orientation on every visit; she said that politicians were capitulating to the will of LGBT lobby groups. She questioned the allocation of public funds to the advocacy group LGBT Foundation: "It's clear that spineless politicians, pathetically eager to be on-trend, are being manipulated by lobby groups such as the Lesbian, Gay, Bisexual and Transgender (LGBT) Foundation, a 'charity' reportedly behind the new NHS policy".

=== COVID-19 pandemic ===
Pearson said during the COVID-19 pandemic that she would not wear a protective face mask because she considered it demeaning. In September 2020, Pearson suggested purposely infecting young people with COVID-19 to create herd immunity within the population. In January 2021, Pearson drew censure from some Twitter users after outing a critic's employer on Twitter, following her claim that National Health Service (NHS) bed occupancy during the pandemic was lower than suggested.

According to The Guardian, Pearson has made misleading claims about COVID-19. In December 2020, she wrote in her Telegraph column that "Last week, Sir Patrick Vallance and Prof Chris Whitty presented another of their Graphs of Doom; this one cherry-picked several hospitals on course to run out of beds." However, this was false, and no such data was presented in the period stated. In July 2021, she misleadingly tweeted that hospitalisations were 0.5% of COVID-19 cases; Full Fact found that the calculation was incorrect, but also did not make sense due to the lag between testing positive and hospitalisation.

== Personal life ==
Pearson was married to fellow journalist Simon Pearson, in May 1988 in Lincoln. She subsequently lived with Anthony Lane, a film critic for The New Yorker.

Pearson was declared bankrupt following a personal insolvency order made by the High Court of Justice in London on 9 November 2015. The bankruptcy petitioner was the Commissioners for HM Revenue and Customs.

== Awards and honours ==
=== Literary awards ===
Year	Work	Award	Category	Result	Ref
2003	I Don't Know How She Does It	Bollinger Everyman Wodehouse Prize	—	Shortlisted	
2003	I Don't Know How She Does It	Virgin Books Newcomer of the Year Award	—	Won	
2003	I Don't Know How She Does It	Waverton Good Read Award	—	Longlisted	

== Bibliography ==
- —— (2002). I Don't Know How She Does It (hardcover 1st ed.). London: Chatto & Windus. ISBN 9780701173029.
- —— (2010). I Think I Love You (hardcover 1st ed.). London: Chatto & Windus. ISBN 9780701176976.
- —— (2017). How Hard Can It Be? (hardcover 1st ed.). London: The Borough Press. ISBN 9780008150525.
