= Person of Interest (film) =

British drama short film

- Screenplay by: Aysha Rafaele
- Directed by: Aysha Rafaele
- Starring: Asim Chaudhry
- Music by: Roger Goula
- Country of origin: United Kingdom
- Original language: English

Production
- Producers: Joseph Bullman; Meeshan Saxena
- Running time: 30 minutes
- Production company: Halcyon Heart Films

Original release
- Network: Channel 4
- Release: 2 December 2024

Person of Interest is a 2024 British television film written and directed by Aysha Rafaele and starring Asim Chaudhry. It was broadcast on Channel 4 on 2 December 2024.

== Premise ==
The film follows a British Muslim minicab driver in August 2024.

== Cast ==
- Asim Chaudhry as Shakil Khan
- Tom Durant Pritchard as Max
- Julia Davis as Dr. Kate
- Craig Parkinson as The Man
- Natasha Atherton as Candy
- Posy Sterling as Alice Khan

== Production ==
The film is written and directed by Aysha Rafaele. The cast is led by Asim Chaudhry and includes Julia Davis and Craig Parkinson.

== Broadcast ==
The film was broadcast in the United Kingdom on Channel 4 on 2 December 2024.

== Reception ==
Keith Watson in The Daily Telegraph praised Chaudhry for an "impressive performance that punched way above the weight of the material" but felt that "the drama buckled under the strain of trying to squeeze a big story into a tiny space". Carol Midgely in The Times described it as "a well-written drama and I could see its point" but felt that the run time meant it "felt too short" to do justice to the issues it raised.
