= Posy Sterling =

British actress (born 1992)

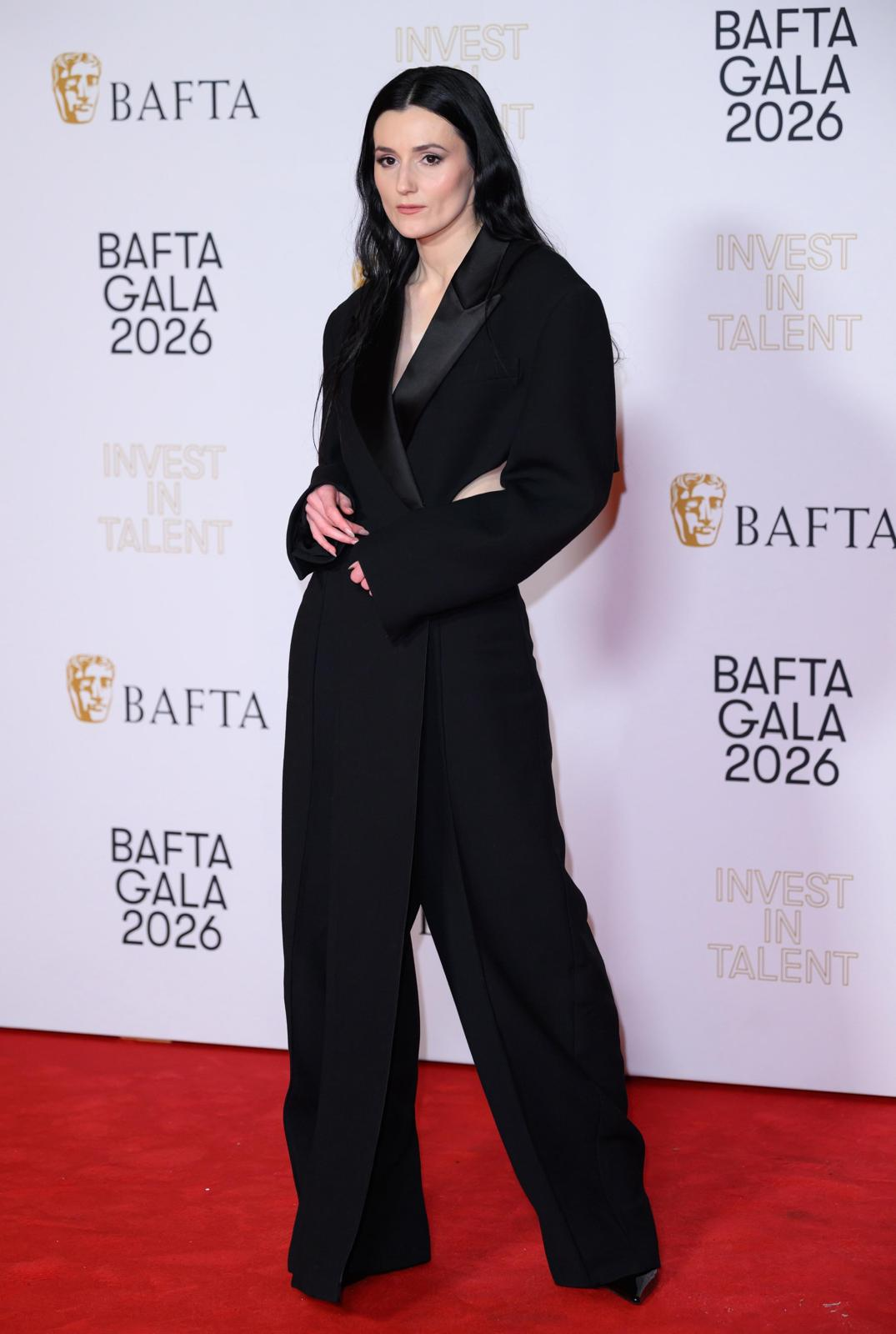
- Sterling in 2026
- Born: 19 November 1992 (age 33); Manchester, England
- Education: Italia Conti Academy of Theatre Arts

Posy Sterling (born 19 November 1992) is a British stage, television and film actress. For her performance in the film Lollipop (2024), she earned a British Independent Film Award and a BAFTA Rising Star Award nomination.

== Early life ==
Sterling was born in Manchester, England, in 1992, but spent time in her childhood in north London and Market Harborough in Leicestershire from the age of 10 years old. She attended Ridgeway Primary Academy, Welland Park Academy and Robert Smyth Academy. She was accepted into Italia Conti Academy of Theatre Arts and was part of Clean Break’s Young Artists programme in 2015. Also, a singer, Jane Winehouse invited her to participate in the Amy’s Yard outreach programme and Sterling wrote and recorded a song in Winehouse’s studio.

== Career ==
Sterling was named by Screen International as one of 2023’s Stars of Tomorrow. She performed alongside Saoirse Ronan in addiction drama film The Outrun (2023). That year, she could be seen in BBC One historical drama series World on Fire opposite Jonah Hauer-King.

On Stage, Sterling Dixon and Daughters at the Dorfman Theatre in 2023. She appeared in Benedict Andrews adaptation of The Cherry Orchard at the Donmar Warehouse in London, as well as a run in New York in 2025.

On television, Sterling played the female lead in Channel 4 single television drama Person of Interest opposite Asim Chaudhry and appeared in ITVX psychological thriller Playing Nice, starring and produced by James Norton in 2025.

Sterling appeared as single mother Molly in the British film Lollipop from Daisy May Hudson. She won for breakthrough performance at the British Independent Film Awards 2025. She was nominated for the BAFTA Rising Star Award in January 2026.

== Filmography ==
Year	Title	Role	Notes
2023	The Outrun	Rita	Film
2023	World on Fire	Eileen	1 episode
2024	Person of Interest	Alice Khan	TV film
2024	Lollipop	Molly Brown	Film
2025	Playing Nice	Kiera	2 episodes
2026	Dirty Business	Julie Preen	docudrama
