= The Langtons =

Group of villages in Leicestershire, England

Coordinates: 52.527°N 0.930°W

The Langtons is an area of Harborough, Leicestershire, England comprising the following villages:

- Church Langton
- East Langton
- Thorpe Langton
- Tur Langton
- West Langton
