= Dirty Business (TV series) =

British docudrama

- Genre: Docudrama
- Written by: Joseph Bullman
- Directed by: Joseph Bullman
- Starring: David Thewlis; Jason Watkins; Asim Chaudhry; Posy Sterling
- Country of origin: United Kingdom
- Original language: English
- No. of series: 1
- No. of episodes: 3

Production
- Executive producer: Aysha Rafaele
- Producers: Laura McCutcheon; Meeshan Saxena
- Running time: 47 minutes
- Production company: Halcyon Heart Films

Original release
- Network: Channel 4
- Release: 23 February – 25 February 2026

Dirty Business is a British docudrama television series written and directed by Joseph Bullman and starring Posy Sterling, David Thewlis, Jason Watkins and Asim Chaudhry for Channel 4.

== Premise ==
The series portrays a decade-long investigation into sewage contaminated water by Water Companies in Burford, Oxfordshire, carried out by two neighbours, Ashley Smith, a former police detective, and Peter Hammond, a Professor of Computational Biology, who notice fish in the local Windrush river are dying, and receive help from a sewage treatment plant whistle blower. The series also follows a family who lost an eight-year old daughter due to E-coli poisoning.

== Cast ==
- David Thewlis as Ash Smith, a retired detective with the Counter Corruption Unit
- Jason Watkins as Peter Hammond, a retired professor of computational biology
- Posy Sterling as Julie Preen
- Tom McKay as Mark Preen
- Alex Jennings as Sir James Bevan
- Asim Chaudhry as Mickey Lazarus
- Alice Lowe as Susan Davy
- Chanel Cresswell as Hanna Swift, a fictitious character, to disguise the identity of real-life Environment Agency whistleblower, Robert Forrester
- Vicki Pepperdine as Lucy Hunt
- Charlotte Ritchie as Sophie Harrison
- Juliet Cowan as Debbie Henderson
- Tom Durant-Pritchard as Chris Hines (a founding member of Surfers Against Sewage)
- Craig Parkinson as John Bull
- Stephen Wight as Alex Sinclair
- Andrew Havill as Richard Aylard
- Jon Culshaw as Alan Wrigley, MP
- Sarah Durham as Julia Simpson
- Mike Noble as Reuben Santer
- Lucia Keskin as Poppi Humphries
- Indie Rose Sterland as Suzanne Preen
- Madison Waterworth as Heather Preen
- Tom Walker as Guy Kingsnorth, a member of the UK Council For Water
- Scarlett Hiles as Ashleigh Hamlyn
- Dexter Hiles as Dylan Hamlyn

== Production ==
The three-part series is produced for Channel 4 by Halcyon Heart Films and written and directed by Joseph Bullman. It is produced by Laura McCutcheon and Meeshan Saxena with Aysha Rafaele as executive producer. The series is part-based on the real-life campaign group Windrush Against Sewage Pollution (WASP). Members of the production crew and actors met with members of WASP prior to filming.

The cast is led by David Thewlis, Jason Watkins and Asim Chaudhry as well as Posy Sterling, Tom McKay, Jon Culshaw, Vicki Pepperdine, Craig Parkinson, Charlotte Ritchie, Chanel Cresswell, Lucia Keskin, and Alex Jennings. Filming was completed by January 2026.

== Broadcast ==
The series broadcast on Channel 4 from 23 February 2026.
