= Lollipop (2024 film) =

- Theatrical release poster
- Directed by: Daisy-May Hudson
- Written by: Daisy-May Hudson
- Produced by: Cecilia Frugiuele; Olivier Kaempfer
- Starring: Posy Sterling; Idil Ahmed; TerriAnn Cousins; Tegan-Mia Stanley Rhoads; Luke Howitt; Aliyah Abdi; Johanna Allitt
- Cinematography: Jaime Ackroyd
- Edited by: Lee Mckarkiel
- Music by: James William Blades
- Production companies: Parkville Pictures; BBC Film; BFI
- Distributed by: MetFilm Distribution
- Release dates: 20 August 2024 (Edinburgh International Film Festival); 13 June 2025 (United Kingdom)
- Running time: 100 minutes
- Country: United Kingdom
- Language: English

Lollipop is a 2024 British drama film directed and written by Daisy-May Hudson. The film premiered at the Edinburgh International Film Festival on 20 August 2024, and was released in the United Kingdom on 13 June 2025.

== Cast ==
- Posy Sterling as Molly Brown
- Idil Ahmed as Amina
- TerriAnn Cousins as Sylvie
- Tegan-Mia Stanley Rhoads as Ava
- Luke Howitt as Leo
- Aliyah Abdi as Mya
- Johanna Allitt as Sheila

== Release ==
Lollipop premiered at the Edinburgh International Film Festival on 20 August 2024. In April 2025, MetFilm Distribution acquired the UK film distribution rights, and released the film in cinemas on 13 June.

== Reception ==
On the review aggregator website Rotten Tomatoes, 100% of 17 critics' reviews are positive. Peter Bradshaw of The Guardian gave the film four out of five stars, stating in his review "Lollipop is an impassioned, humane and urgently performed drama, a vivid look at what it's like to be reduced to screaming anguish by the system".

For her role as Molly Brown, Posy Sterling won for breakthrough performance at the British Independent Film Awards 2025.
