= François-Eudes Chanfrault =

French composer and laptop musician

- Born: 2 December 1974; Suresnes, Hauts-de-Seine, France
- Died: 11 March 2016 (aged 41); Paris, France
- Other names: François Eudes
- Occupations: Composer; musician
- Notable work: Haute Tension; Inside; Donkey Punch; Vinyan

François-Eudes Chanfrault (2 December 1974 – 11 March 2016), also credited as François Eudes and Francois Eudes, was a French composer and laptop musician. Chanfrault's film music composition work in 2003 included the movie Haute Tension by filmmaker Alexandre Aja and Who Killed Bambi? directed by Gilles Marchand. He released his first music album, Computer-Assisted Sunset, on compact disc in 2005 via the label MK2, which received a positive reception from publications including Fnac and Les Inrocks. The same year, his music was used in the film Beyond Hatred, which was directed by Olivier Meyrou, and received a favorable review in Variety. In 2006, he worked with director Alexandre Aja again, this time on the film The Hills Have Eyes. His work on the music for this film inspired director Jeremy Forni for his 2011 documentary film Après la gauche.

Chanfrault's compositions for the 2007 film Inside directed by Julien Maury and Alexandre Bustillo were positively received by media including Popjournalism. His soundtrack and score for the 2008 film Donkey Punch, which was directed by Olly Blackburn, was praised by film critic Kurt Loder in a review for MTV.com and was also received favorably in a review of the film in Libération. He also composed the music for two more films in 2008: Vinyan by filmmaker Fabrice Du Welz, and The Wedding Song (Le Chant des mariées) directed by Karin Albou. His music for the television movie Belleville Story directed by Arnaud Malherbe was favorably reviewed in two separate articles in L'Express.

== Career ==
=== Album ===
In 2005, Chanfrault released his first music album on compact disc of his original compositions, titled Computer Assisted Sunset, on the label MK2. He received positive reception from Fnac, "Chanfrault is one of the few French musicians to accommodate both a classical and a true technological expertise." Trip-Hop.net gave the album a rating of three and a half stars out of four, and characterized it as dark and nostalgic. A review in Les Inrocks observed, "The listener is surrounded and absorbed by the sound."

=== Cinema ===
Chenfrault's first film soundtrack work was on Celebration, which was directed by Olivier Meyrou. A documentary film about Yves Saint Laurent, Celebration was blocked from distribution by Pierre Bergé. Chanfrault composed the music for the 2003 film Haute Tension, which was directed by Alexandre Aja. Cinezik noted Chanfrault created a strident and scary atmosphere on the film's soundtrack. Who Killed Bambi? directed by Gilles Marchand, featured compositions by Chanfrault and was released in the same year as Haute Tension. He composed the music for the 2005 film Beyond Hatred, which was directed by Olivier Meyrou. His work on the film was well received; a review by Variety praised François-Eudes Chanfrault's sparse, sorrowful, string-based score. Chanfrault's work on the music for the 2006 film The Hills Have Eyes directed by Alexandre Aja inspired the tone for the 2011 documentary Après la gauche by filmmaker Jeremy Forni.

Chanfrault composed the music of the 2007 film Inside, which was directed by Julien Maury and Alexandre Bustillo and starred Alysson Paradis, Béatrice Dalle, Nathalie Roussel, and Tahar Rahim. The soundtrack to the film was released in 2007 by Asphalt Duchess. In a review of the film by Popjournalism, critic Sarah Gopaul described Chanfrault's composition as a sonorous score. A review of the soundtrack by Adrien Pauchet in Cinezik wrote positively of Chanfrault's "successful and eclectic score accompanying the film".

He composed music for director Olly Blackburn that was used the 2008 film Donkey Punch, which was released by the British film production company Warp X. The soundtrack and score for the film was released in 2009. Film critic Kurt Loder wrote favorably of Chanfrault's work on Donkey Punch in a review for MTV.com he wrote, "The movie is powered by claustrophobic menace and a notably effective score by François-Eudes Chanfrault that features spectral synths and the eerie clack of electro-castanets." A review of Donkey Punch in Libération by Alexandr Hervaud emphasized Chanfrault's "trippy soundtrack" as among the highlights of the film.

Filmmaker Fabrice Du Welz utilized Chanfrault's music composition skills for his 2008 film Vinyan. Writing for Gamona, reviewer Martin Beck commented favorably on "a hypnotic score by François-Eudes Chanfrault (known for his equally great music for Inside)." A review by Splatter Container wrote that Chanfrault's composition effectively conveys "the sense of emptiness … that pervades" throughout the film.

He served as music composer on director Karin Albou's 2008 film The Wedding Song (Le Chant des mariées). Chanfrault composed the music for the television movie Belleville Story directed by Arnaud Malherbe. A review in L'Express by Marion Festraëts observed, "The frenetic pace of the film was driven by the music." A subsequent review in L'Express by Eric Libiot characterized the soundtrack by Chanfrault as, "absolutely remarkable".

After a long illness, François-Eudes Chanfrault died on 11 March 2016, aged 41.

== Discography ==
Computer-Assisted Sunset

- 2005 release by MK2

All music is composed by François-Eudes Chanfrault.

Computer Assisted Sunset track list
No.	Title	Length
1.	"How I Killed Bambi, Pt. 1: Hospital Theme"	3:25
2.	"How I Killed Bambi, Pt. 2: Corridor"	4:34
3.	"How I Killed Bambi, Pt. 3: Death Kingdom"	9:47
4.	"Black Bird"	3:52
5.	"The Park"	8:25
6.	"Computer Assisted Sunset"	6:55
7.	"Solaris"	9:59
8.	"Untitled [Redux]"	7:33
9.	"How I Killed Bambi, Pt. 4: Cooper Theme"	5:11
Total length:		59:41

== Filmography ==
Year	Title	Role	Director
2003	Haute Tension	Composer, performer	Alexandre Aja
2003	Who Killed Bambi?	Composer	Gilles Marchand
2005	Beyond Hatred	Composer	Olivier Meyrou
2006	The Hills Have Eyes	Sound designer, music designer	Alexandre Aja
2006	Danger Attacks at Dawn	Voice: "The Director"	Bertrand Le Cabec, Sébastien Savine, Frédéric Servant
2007	Celebration	Composer	Olivier Meyrou
2007	Inside	Composer	Julien Maury, Alexandre Bustillo
2008	Donkey Punch	Composer	Olly Blackburn
2008	Vinyan	Composer	Fabrice Du Welz
2008	The Wedding Song (Le Chant des mariées)	Composer	Karin Albou
2009	POV	Original score: "Beyond Hatred"	Olivier Meyrou
2010	Belleville Story	Composer	Arnaud Malherbe
2012	Cornouaille	Composer	Anne Le Ny
2014	Jamie Marks Is Dead	Composer	Carter Smith
2014	Kristy	Composer	Olly Blackburn
2015	Papa lumière	Composer	Ada Loueilh
2015	The Wakhan Front	Composer	Clément Cogitore

== See also ==
- Chronological list of French classical composers
- List of French composers
