= Sian Breckin =

British actress, born 1982

- Born: 1982 (age 43–44); United Kingdom
- Education: East 15 Acting School
- Occupation: Actress
- Known for: Donkey Punch; Tyrannosaur; DCI Banks

Sian Breckin (born 1982) is a British film, television and theatre actress.

Donkey Punch directed by Olly Blackburn was Breckin's feature film debut; she starred alongside Jaime Winstone, Nichola Burley, Tom Burke and Julian Morris. Subsequent television appearances included roles on series The Bill, Inspector George Gently, The Royal and Heartbeat.

Breckin acted in the film Tender directed by Deborah Haywood, and in Alice by filmmaker Marianne Elliott. She had guest starring roles on the television series Doctors and Casualty, and appeared as PC Janet Taylor in DCI Banks. She starred as Kelly in the 2011 film Tyrannosaur directed by Paddy Considine.

== Early life and education ==
Breckin attended Roundhay School and the East 15 Acting School.

== Career ==
Breckin was directed by Olly Blackburn in the thriller film Donkey Punch; she portrayed the character Lisa and starred alongside Jaime Winstone, Nichola Burley, Tom Burke and Julian Morris. She commented to the Yorkshire Evening Post about her experience acting in the film: "Filming it was such a wonderful experience. I learned an incredible amount and the team became very close. We are all incredibly proud of the film." Breckin told the Irish Independent the intent was to portray realistic scenes in the film: "We wanted it as realistic as possible in terms of young people having fun. Sex isn't glamorous". She commented to Sky News: "It's about us, it's about young people. Hopefully people can identify with that. It had to be that the audience can relate to my character, that they can see how she gets herself in certain situations and how easily that can happen." Donkey Punch is Breckin's first feature film. LoveFilm observed that Donkey Punch is "acted with conviction by a cast of newcomers".

Breckin had a role in January 2008 on the television series The Bill. She appeared in 2009 on the programme Inspector George Gently, as character Audrey Chadwick. She played the character of Judith Ure in 2009 in the television series The Royal; Breckin guest starred opposite series regular Damian O'Hare who played Dr. Burnett, a physician tasked with diagnosing her pregnant character's ailments. Breckin guest starred on the television drama Heartbeat playing the role of Janice Hopley opposite actor James Gaddas who portrayed her father.

Breckin starred in the film Tender, directed by Deborah Haywood. Marianne Elliott directed Breckin in a role in her 2010 short film titled Alice. Breckin portrayed the role of PC Janet Taylor in 2010 in the television series DCI Banks. She portrayed the character of Debs Hastings in a 2010 episode of the television series Doctors. She guest starred on the television series Casualty in 2010, playing the part of Kim Rees.

Breckin starred as Kelly in the 2011 film Tyrannosaur directed by Paddy Considine.

== Filmography ==
=== Film ===
Year	Film	Role	Director
2008	Donkey Punch	Lisa	Olly Blackburn
2009	Tender	Elain	Deborah Haywood
2010	Alice	Girl with Bell	Marianne Elliott
2011	Tyrannosaur	Kelly (Samuel's Mum)	Paddy Considine
2013	Vice of Mind	Wendy	Adam Razvi
2013	Starred Up	Governor Cardew	David Mackenzie

=== Television ===
Year	Title	Role	Notes
2008	The Bill	Harriet McGuire	Episode: No. 24.20 "Corrupted"
2009	Inspector George Gently	Audrey Chadwick	Episode: No. 2.2 "Gently in the Night"
2009	The Royal	Judith Ure	Episode: No. 7.10 "In the Air"
2009	Heartbeat	Janice Hopley	Episode: No. 18.23 "Pass the Parcel"
2010	Doctors	Debs Hastings	Episode: No. 11.212 "Unmoved"
2010	DCI Banks	PC Janet Taylor	Episodes: No. 1.1 – 1.2 "Aftermath – Part 1", "Aftermath – Part 2"
2010	Casualty	Kim Rees	Episode: No. 25.17 "Winter Wonderland"
2012	Hollyoaks	Deena Hardman	Episodes: No. 1.3267 – 1.3297
2013	Dates	Heidi	Episode: No. 1.7
2013	Scott & Bailey	Nikki Madden	Episode: No. 2.2
2013	Truckers	Wendy Newman	
2015	Silent Witness	DC Gabby Lawson	Episodes: "Sniper's Nest" No. 153 & 154

=== Theatre ===
- 2005, Annie in Inside Out by Kat Joyce
- 2005, Julie in After Miss Julie by Patrick Marber

== See also ==
- Cinema of the United Kingdom
- Alumni from Roundhay School
- Alumni from East 15 Acting School
- List of British actors
- Television of the United Kingdom
- Theatre of the United Kingdom
