= Warp Films =

British film and television company

- Industry: Film and TV Production Company
- Founded: 2001
- Founder: Rob Mitchell; Steve Beckett; Mark Herbert
- Headquarters: England
- Website: warpfilms.com

Warp Films is a British independent film and television production company. It was established in 2001 by Rob Mitchell and Steve Beckett, the owners of the record label Warp Records.

== History ==
Warp Films was established by the Warp Records owners, Rob Mitchell and Steve Beckett. After the death of Mitchell in 2001, Beckett decided to continue with Warp Films and enlisted the expertise of Sheffield friend Mark Herbert to run the company.

Warp Films initially produced and released short films by Chris Morris and Chris Cunningham, who had created music videos for Warp artists such as Aphex Twin. According to Beckett, Warp found that some music video directors they were working with, such as Cunningham, had similar personalities to the musicians, "pushing the boundaries" of their medium. Additionally, new technology was making it cheaper to create films.

The first Warp Films release, Morris's My Wrongs 8245–8249 & 117, won the 2003 BAFTA for best short film. In 2004, Warp released its first feature film, Dead Man's Shoes, directed by Shane Meadows, which was nominated for a BAFTA. Meadows's next film, This Is England (2007), won the BAFTA for Best British Film. In 2022, The Independent described This Is England as Warp Films' "crowning glory to date: as visceral as any early Warp record, but with the bleeding humanity its best artists have found in their maturity". In 2009, The Independent wrote that Warp Films had "quickly become the UK's most consistent and challenging indie production company". In 2006, Warp launched Warp X to seek new talent in film, with funding by the UK Film Council and FilmFour.

In 2004, Robin Gutch joined Mark Herbert and Producer Barry Ryan to set up Warp X, a low-budget digital 'studio' to develop and produce films with a focus on new talent and commercial potential. The first projects under the new label were Chris Waitt's A Complete History of My Sexual Failures and Olly Blackburn's Donkey Punch, which were both launched at the Sundance International Film Festival in 2007. These were followed by Mark Tonderai's Hush Paul King's Bunny & the Bull, and Xiaolu Guo's She, a Chinese. Another Warp X production was 2009 documentary All Tomorrow's Parties, covering the history of the All Tomorrow's Parties music festival. The film was created using footage generated by the fans and musicians attending the events themselves, on a multitude of formats including Super8, camcorder and mobile phone. In 2009, Warp films produced Exhibit A, a groundbreaking pseudo-documentary film. The film was awarded the title of 'Best UK Feature' at the Raindance Film Festival and was nominated for three British Independent Film Awards.

Also in 2009, Warp produced The Mighty Boosh Live: Future Sailors Tour by Paul King, Le Donk & Scor-zay-zee by Shane Meadows as well as a concert film Arctic Monkeys at the Apollo.

In 2010, Warp Films produced Morris's debut feature Four Lions, a satirical comedy following a group of homegrown Islamic terrorists from Sheffield, England. The film was nominated for two BAFTA awards and won the 'Outstanding Debut by a British Writer, director, or Producer' BAFTA award for Chris Morris. Also released in 2011 was Richard Ayoade's debut feature Submarine starring Noah Taylor, Sally Hawkins and Paddy Considine. The film featured original songs by Arctic Monkeys front man Alex Turner and won many awards worldwide, including the Best Screenplay award at the 2011 British Independent Film Awards. Richard Ayoade was nominated for a BAFTA for Outstanding Debut by a British Writer, Director or Producer at the 65th British Academy Film Awards.

In 2010 Warp produced for Channel 4, Shane Meadows' This Is England '86, a continuation from the 2006 film. It achieved record viewing figures for Channel 4 and won a BAFTA for leading actress Vicky McClure.

Warp X production Kill List was released in the UK on 28 August 2011. Directed by Ben Wheatley, the film stars Neil Maskell, Michael Smiley and MyAnna Buring. It has gone on to win several awards internationally, including a British Independent Film Award for supporting actor Michael Smiley.

Tyrannosaur, also produced through Warp X, was released in 2011. Directed by Paddy Considine, it was an exploration of how love and friendship can be found in the darkest of places. Tyrannosaur stars Peter Mullan, Olivia Colman and Eddie Marsan. Winning the BAFTA for 'Outstanding Debut by a British Writer, director, or Producer' for director Paddy Considine and producer Diarmid Scrimshaw. 2011 also saw the world premiere of Justin Kurzel's Snowtown.

This Is England '88, the sequel to the 2010 television series This Is England '86, aired on Channel 4 over three consecutive nights from 13 December 2011.

== 2012–2020 ==
Warp Films continued to produce award winning features and TV from 2012 including Southcliffe by Sean Durkin, two seasons of The Midnight Beast, Berberian Sound Studio by Peter Strickland and For Those in Peril by Paul Wright. The latter would be the last production released under Warp X.

In 2015, the final sequel to This is England, This is England '90, aired, winning three BAFTAs. Over the next couple of years, further success would come with Shane Meadows' The Stone Roses: Made of Stone, 71' by Yann Demange The Last Panthers by Jack Thorne, Ghost Stories by Jeremy Dyson and Andy Nyman, The Death and Life of John F. Donovan by Xavier Dolan and the directorial debut of Idris Elba with Yardie. The Virtues by Shane Meadows released in 2019 on Channel 4 would gain five stars in The Guardian and be listed as one of the best dramas of the decade.

== 2020–present ==
In 2020, Warp Films released Little Birds for Sky and in 2021, their first ever musical Everybody's Talking About Jamie, based on the musical of the same name, directed by Jonathan Butterell, which in turn was adapted from the BBC Three documentary Jamie: Drag Queen at 16. Produced for New Regency and Film4 and released worldwide on Amazon Prime, the story follows and is based upon the true-life story of 16-year-old British schoolboy Jamie Campbell, as he overcomes prejudice and bullying, to step out of the darkness and become a drag queen.

In 2025, Warp released Adolescence on Netflix which became the most watched streaming television show in the United Kingdom in a single week and the second most watched English Language show of all time on the platform. Directed by Phillip Barantini and created/written by Jack Thorne and Stephen Graham, it successfully was awarded 8 Emmys including for Best Limited Series, Lead Actor, Supporting Actor, Supporting Actress, Writing, Directing, Cinematography and Casting. The same year, Warp released Reunion for the BBC written by Deaf writer William Mager and directed by Luke Snellin, with the majority of the cast and the crew on the series also deaf or using British Sign Language.

== Films ==
Title	Year	Director
Dead Man's Shoes	2004	Shane Meadows
This Is England	2006	Shane Meadows
Grow Your Own	2007	Richard Laxton
Arctic Monkeys at the Apollo	2008	Richard Ayoade
A Complete History of My Sexual Failures	2008	Chris Waitt
Donkey Punch	2008	Oliver Blackburn
The Mighty Boosh Live: Future Sailors Tour	2009	Paul King
Le Donk & Scor-zay-zee	2009	Shane Meadows
Hush	2009	Mark Tonderai
All Tomorrow's Parties	2009	All Tomorrow's People & Jonathan Caouette
Bunny and the Bull	2009	Paul King
She, a Chinese	2009	Xiaolu Guo
Exhibit A	2009	Dom Rotheroe
Four Lions	2010	Chris Morris
Submarine	2010	Richard Ayoade
Tyrannosaur	2011	Paddy Considine
Kill List	2011	Ben Wheatley
Snowtown	2011	Justin Kurzel
Berberian Sound Studio	2012	Peter Strickland
For Those in Peril	2013	Paul Wright
The Stone Roses: Made of Stone	2013	Shane Meadows
'71	2014	Yann Demange
Ghost Stories	2017	Jeremy Dyson & Andy Nyman
Yardie	2018	Idris Elba
The Death and Life of John F. Donovan	2018	Xavier Dolan
Everybody's Talking About Jamie	2021	Jonathan Butterell

== TV ==
Title	Year	Director
Fur TV	2008	Chris Waitt
This Is England '86	2010	Shane Meadows & Tom Harper
This is England '88	2011	Shane Meadows
The Minor Character	2012	Richard Curson Smith
The Snipist	2012	Matthew Holness
Care	2012	Amanda Boyle
Privado	2012	Jim Hosking
The Midnight Beast	2012	Ben Gregor
Southcliffe	2013	Sean Durkin
The Midnight Beast 2	2014	Al Campbell
This is England '90	2015	Shane Meadows
The Last Panthers	2015	Johan Renck
Liam Williams' Valentine	2017	Jonathan Schey
The Virtues	2019	Shane Meadows
Little Birds	2020	Stacie Passon
Adolescence	2025	Philip Barantini
Reunion	2025	Luke Snellin

== Shorts ==
Title	Year	Director
My Wrongs #8245–8249 & 117	2002	Chris Morris
Rubber Johnny	2005	Chris Cunningham
Scummy Man	2006	Paul Fraser
Dogs Mercury	2006	Martin Radich
Dog Altogether	2007	Paddy Considine
Slippin'	2007	Jason Nwansi
The Archivist	2008	James Lees
Curtains	2009	Julian Barratt
The Taxidermist	2009	Bert and Bertie
A Gun for George	2010	Matthew Holness
The Organ Grinders Monkey	2011	Jake and Dinos Chapman
Swimmer	2012	Lynne Ramsay
The Beast	2013	Corinna Faith
No Kaddish in Carmarthen	2013	Jesse Armstrong
Dr Easy	2013	Shynola
Liam and Lenka	2014	Michael Keillor
The Tale of Hillbelly	2016	Isaiah Saxon, Sean Hellfritsch & Daren Rabinovitch
Unseen	2017	Katie Mitchell
