= Warp X =

- Company type: Production company
- Industry: Film production
- Founded: 2005
- Headquarters: Sheffield, United Kingdom
- Website: warpx.co.uk

Warp X is a British film production company, sister to Warp Films based in Sheffield, UK with further offices in Nottingham and London. The company was founded in 2005 and produces feature films.

== Company ==
Warp X was founded in 2005 and produces feature films. It is a digital film studio that produces feature films in the UK with budgets usually between £400,000 and £800,000. The studio serves as a format for new film directors to create movies for the first time on a lower budget scale with less expectation for high box office revenues on their initial feature foray.

The film studio began with support from organisations including Warp Films, Film4 Productions, the UK Film Council, EM Media, Screen Yorkshire and Optimum Releasing. The intent of the film studio's creation was to add energy and vitality to the film industry in Britain.

== Filmography ==
Year	Film	Director	Notes
2008	A Complete History of My Sexual Failures	Chris Waitt	Winner, Festival Prize: Spirit of Darklight, Darklight Film Festival
2008	Donkey Punch	Olly Blackburn	Filmed on a £1 million budget, over 24 days, in South Africa
2009	Bunny and the Bull	Paul King	Winner, Best Achievement in Production, British Independent Film Awards
2009	She, a Chinese	Xiaolu Guo	Winner, Golden Leopard, Locarno International Film Festival
2009	She, a Chinese	Xiaolu Guo	Winner, Screenplay Award, Hamburg Film Festival
2009	All Tomorrow's Parties	All Tomorrow's People & Jonathan Caouette	Covers several years of the music festival, All Tomorrow's Parties, which began in 2002
2009	Hush	Mark Tonderai	Nominated, Best Achievement in Production, British Independent Film Awards
2011	Tyrannosaur	Paddy Considine	Winner, Outstanding Debut by a British Writer, Director or Producer, BAFTA
2011	Tyrannosaur	Paddy Considine	Winner, The World Cinema Award for Directing: Dramatic, Sundance Film Festival
2011	Tyrannosaur	Paddy Considine	Winner, Best British Independent Film, British Independent Film Awards
2011	Tyrannosaur	Paddy Considine	Winner, Best Director, British Independent Film Awards
2011	Kill List	Ben Wheatley	Nominated, Best Achievement in Production, British Independent Film Awards
2011	Kill List	Ben Wheatley	Nominated, Best Director, British Independent Film Awards
2011	Kill List	Ben Wheatley	Winner, Best Horror, Empire Awards
2012	Berberian Sound Studio	Peter Strickland	Previewed at London FrightFest Film Festival in August 2012, and at the 2012 Edinburgh International Film Festival
2013	For Those in Peril	Paul Wright	First feature film for director Paul Wright; with debut at 2013 Cannes Film Festival
