= Olly Blackburn =

English movie director and screenwriter

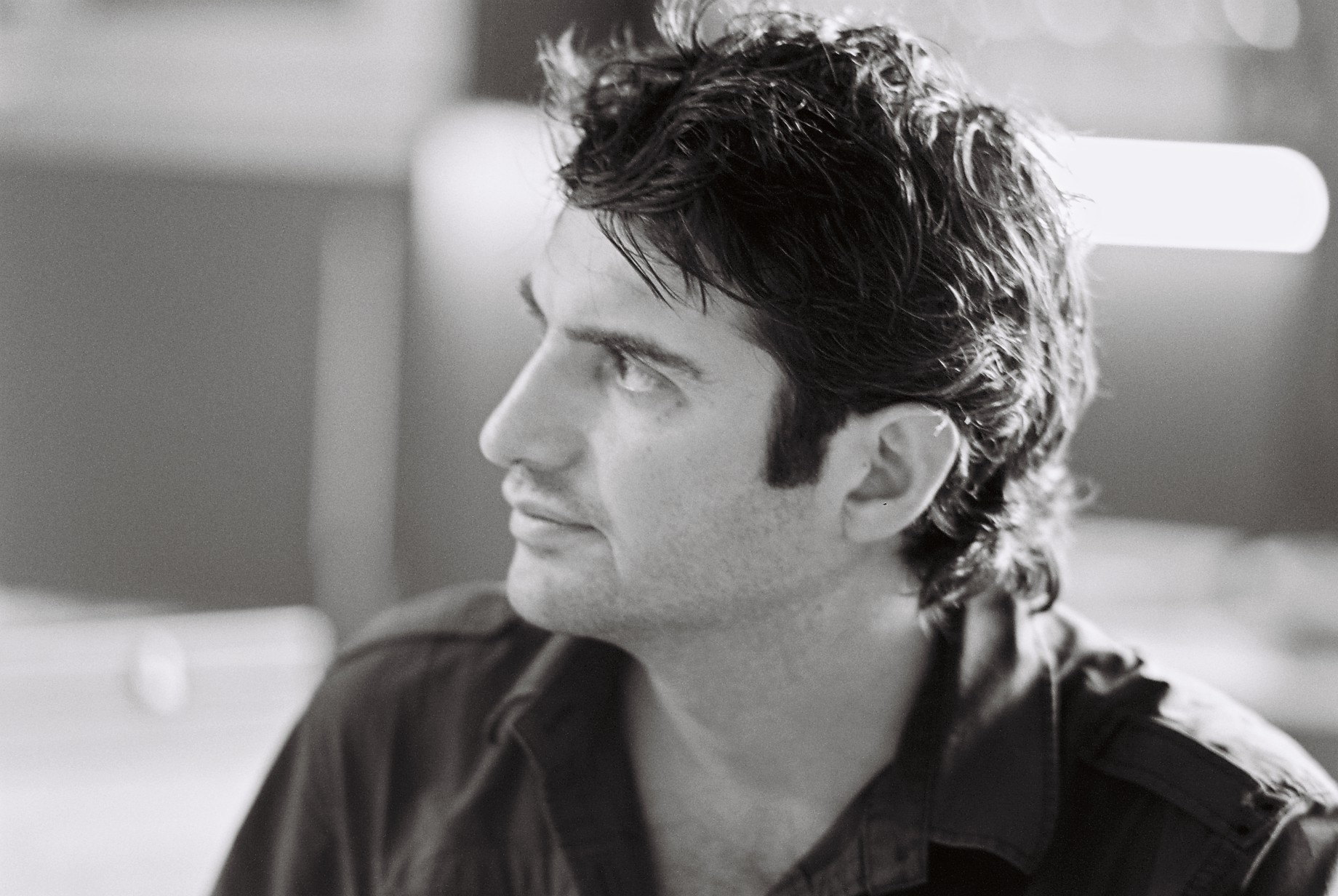
- Born: Oliver Blackburn; London, England
- Other names: Oliver Blackburn, Ollie Blackburn
- Occupations: Film director and screenwriter
- Years active: 1993–present
- Known for: Donkey Punch, Vinyan
- Website: Official website

Olly Blackburn (also credited as Oliver Blackburn and Ollie Blackburn) is an English film director and screenwriter. Born in London, Blackburn had an acting role in the 1982 short comedy film A Shocking Accident; the film won an Academy Award in 1983 for Best Short Subject. He graduated from Oxford University in 1993 where he studied history. Blackburn won a Fulbright Scholarship and pursued graduate studies in film and television at the Tisch School of the Arts. While there, his film Swallowed received New York University's Martin Scorsese Post-Production Award.

Blackburn began his professional film career directing commercials and music videos, and became associated with the film production company Warp X. He served as Second Unit Director on the film Reverb. Blackburn co-wrote and directed Donkey Punch, which was his first film to be shown at the Sundance Film Festival. He shot the film on a £1 million budget over 24 days in South Africa. Movie critics likened his work on the film to filmmaker Peter Berg's Very Bad Things, director Phillip Noyce's Dead Calm, and Roman Polanski's Knife in the Water. He went on to serve as writer for the film Vinyan, which critics compared to two films by director Nicolas Roeg, Don't Look Now and Heart of Darkness.

== Early life and education ==
Blackburn was born in London, England. In 1982 Blackburn acted in the short comedy film A Shocking Accident directed by James Scott, based on a short story of the same name by Graham Greene. The film won an Academy Award in 1983 for Best Short Subject.

Blackburn received a degree from Oxford University in 1993; he focused on history. He subsequently worked in journalism. Blackburn won a Fulbright Scholarship, and studied television and film as a graduate student at New York University's Tisch School of the Arts. While at NYU, Blackburn created a short film titled Swallowed; this work was recognised with the 1996 Martin Scorsese Post-Production Award. In an interview with IndieLondon, Blackburn stated his role models include Sam Peckinpah and Michael Powell. While living in New York City, Blackburn and his co-writer for Donkey Punch, David Bloom, stayed in an apartment together for one year. Bloom had also been awarded a Fulbright Scholarship to study in the United States. In 2009, Blackburn resided in South London.

== Film career ==
Prior to his work as a film director, Blackburn directed commercials and music videos. He worked on television productions at British film production company Warp X, alongside the company's founder, Robin Gutch.

Blackburn served as Second Unit Director on the film Reverb, written and directed by Eitan Arrusi, and produced by Frank Mannion. Reverb stars Leo Gregory, Eva Birthistle, Margo Stilley, Luke de Woolfson, Stephen Lord, and Neil Newbon. Anton Bitel wrote in Projected Figures that the film "expertly builds the tension from initial disquiet to final outright pandemonium, leaving it for the most part to his atmospheric location and to some jarring jump cuts to disorient the viewer, and resorting to blood and special effects only sparingly. The film's sound design is exquisite, as it must be – but special mention should also be made of the understated and convincingly serious performances of the cast, ensuring that there is not even the faintest whiff of cheese to match Reverb's palpably eerie vibe." The Guardian noted, "In the end, this looks like just another crass, unimaginative and heavy-handed British horror." A review in The Daily Telegraph commented, "Eitan Arrusi's movie appears to have been shot through dirty glass and edited in a blender – it may drive you mad." Total Film observed, "Hidden sounds lead to haunted rooms and tedious occult mythology".

Blackburn directed the 2008 film Donkey Punch, which he co-wrote with David Bloom. His total budget for the film was £1 million. Blackburn's production team went through a casting process which took seven months; the film stars Nichola Burley, Tom Burke, Jaime Winstone and Julian Morris. He shot the film in South Africa, over 24 days. Film shooting for Donkey Punch began in March 2007; during production Blackburn dealt with actors afflicted by hypothermia and tidal surges on location. In an interview with Total Film, Blackburn commented, "I think Donkey Punch is an extreme thriller or an extreme reality-based thriller. The whole point of the film is it's grounded in reality." Blackburn wrote that he made Donkey Punch, "to try to push the genre." Donkey Punch received mixed reviews; the film obtained a rating of 50% based on 51 reviews at Rotten Tomatoes, and a score of 43 out of 100 at Metacritic. The Philadelphia Inquirer compared Blackburn's work to films including filmmaker Peter Berg's Very Bad Things and director Philip Noyce's Dead Calm, and wrote, "Donkey Punch offers a gripping mix of sexual heat and nasty menace." The Los Angeles Times additionally compared Blackburn's work to Dead Calm as well as director Roman Polanski's Knife in the Water, and concluded, Donkey Punch isn't without a certain power as it gleefully turns its careless hedonists into caged, paranoid rats." In The Toronto Star, Peter Howell wrote that "Blackburn knows how to build and maintain suspense without resorting to gratuitous gore. Fans of horror and thriller films should put Donkey Punch on their must-see list." In the NY Press Eric Kohn wrote, "Such a unique thrill. Director Blackburn develops the scenario with remarkably shrewd finesse". while Ted Fry commented in The Seattle Times that "'Donkey Punch' packs a magnetic jolt of fearsome intensity". The film was Blackburn's first work to be shown at the Sundance Film Festival, where it received a positive reception from the audience in attendance.

Blackburn served as writer on the film Vinyan, directed by Fabrice Du Welz. Vinyan stars Emmanuelle Béart, Rufus Sewell, and Julie Dreyfus. Sky Movies likened Vinyan to Nicolas Roeg's two films Don't Look Now and Heart of Darkness; Blackburn interviewed Roeg in 2008 for Time Out London and noted, "Nic Roeg inspires me." This Is London characterised the film as, "a dark and pessimistic drama which goes slap-happily mad towards the end but keeps you watching all the same." Empire also compared the film to Nicolas Roeg's Don't Look Now, and concluded, "Horrific and harrowing but the narrative arc could leave the audience unmoved."

In 2013 he directed Kristy for The Weinstein Company produced by Jamie Patricof Cory Sienaga David Kirschner and Lynette Howell Taylor starring Haley Bennett and Lucas Till. The film premiered at the London Film Festival in 2014 where Anton Bitell writing in Sight & Sound noted that "This follow-up to Blackburn's Donkey Punch is beautifully shot, and sets its mostly familiar stalk-and-dash material within the context of contemporary online anomie and a broader debate about chance versus causality" and in the New Statesman Ryan Gilbey noted its "pervasive sense of dread and a use of DIY tinfoil masks that will make it a perennial Hallowe'en party favourite to rank alongside Friday the 13th and Scream". The film built a cult following with the horror website iHorror calling it "Oliver Blackburn's masterpiece" and orchestrating a grassroots fan campaign to have it released theatrically in the US while Grizzly Bomb asked "Could this be the next cult horror hit?". Since Kristy was released on Netflix in 2015 expanded its reputation as must-watch horror film recommended by sites as diverse as Bleeding Cool, Bustle, Screen Rant and Marieclaire.

== Commercials ==
Olly Blackburn has also had a long-running career directing commercials, often in a visually poetic and comedic style in striking contrast to his dark, suspenseful feature films. Among his best-known commercials are Pampers Pooface which won three Lions at the 2015 Cannes Lions International Festival of Creativity for casting, film craft and best in category, a Clio, Epica Gold and Silver awards and 5 Kinsale Sharks. The Daily Mirror found it hilarious, The Huffington Post called it "epic" and Stephanie Webber wrote in US Magazine "Pampers is airing perhaps its best commercial yet, and it's not even Super Bowl season." His spots for BBC Local Radio Show Your Love won eight London International Awards and a Yellow Pencil at the 2011 D&AD Awards, in 2012 Erbitux Hope won a Cannes Health Silver Lion and a Gold Healthcare Clio. He has twice been selected for the APA collection for BBC Local Radio in 2010 and for Pooface in 2015. He was also nominated as Best New Director for his work with the band Gomez on their song "78 Stone Wobble" at the 1999 CAD music video awards and the CFP Young Directors award at Cannes in 1999 for his 'Anonymous Learners' commercial for BBC Education. He has spoken often about his style and the craft of commercials in publications like The Beak Street Bugle and Little Black Book where he commented on making Pooface that "we managed to create a piece of work that reflected what we all wanted to achieve: basically the awesome, mind-blowing experience of what it's like to take a shit for the first time. I wish Sigmund Freud could have seen it".

== TV career ==
Blackburn is a director of TV drama, directing episodes of Glue, created by Jack Thorne and produced by Eleven Films, the Endeavour season finale "Coda", Victoria created by Daisy Goodwin and StartUp. with Martin Freeman and Ron Perlman. His work on The Widow created by Two Brothers Pictures starring Kate Beckinsale led Euan Ferguson in The Observer to comment that in "The Widow, the second, far better, half of episodes I now see were directed by Olly Blackburn, has been a grower, and ultimately rewarding... Alex Kingston and in particular Babs Olusanmokun, as the filthy General Azikiwe, drunk and surrounded by ghosts, were nuanced, conflicted.". In 2019 he directed the first three episodes and established the world of Sanditon adapted by Andrew Davies from the unfinished novel by Jane Austen. Kathryn Van Arendonk described it in Vulture as "an exquisite production, both beautiful and thoughtful. It's adapted in ways that feel smart and human, while also pumping some helpful friction into the story". Writing in Indiewire Ann Donahue called it "tart and political, gorgeous and honest" while Deciders Meghan O'Keeffe pointed out Sanditon's modernity, "Sanditon is a new kind of Jane Austen adaptation. Oozing with sex, concerned with racial and class politics, and full of scheming anti-heroines who will do whatever it takes to get to the top, it simultaneously throws away the quaint, courtly image of Austen's work while embracing the bitter acid of her pen". In 2022 he directed the second half of Dangerous Liaisons created by Harriet Warner based on Christopher Hampton's award-winning play and film, adapted from the novel by Choderlos de Laclos. His stylish, performance-driven episodes were well received with Mary Littlejohn giving five stars in TVFanatic, writing that "Blackburn loves to play with the camera and uses techniques to significant, dramatic effect" a hunt sequence structured in a single three-and-a-half-minute take "was a cinematic tour de force" In another five star review, Vulture's Alice Burton said "I am obsessed with The Hunting Scene.". Blackburn has shared his thoughts on filming historical adaptations like Sanditon in The Atlantic: "'Viewers in the 21st century want—demand—to see a version of the past that stresses its similarities with the present day'... They want to see Austen rescued from tweeness and coziness. Today's comparison for the turmoil in Sanditon, then, would be to Brexit, "with huge economic change dislocating people," he added. In the new settlement described by Austen, "there is huge economic unease, particularly among the upper class, about industrial change". For Blackburn, every adaptation is inevitably a reflection of its adapters, and the time in which it is made. "You can't take the observer out of the equation," he said. At the same time, though: "Sex, pain, rage, envy ... These things are timeless."

== musikmotion Labs ==
In 2022 Blackburn co-founded musikmotion Labs in collaboration with The University of North Texas, a platform for exploring the intersection between music and moving image across all media through in-depth interviews with leading artists and composers. Participants include the Academy Award-winning composers Anne Dudley and Michael Giacchino, Goya Award-winner Zeltia Montes, cross-media artist, composer and performer Ben Frost, Daniel Pemberton and Tyler Bates.

== Filmography ==
Year	Film	Director	Screenwriter	Other	Notes
1982	A Shocking Accident			Yes	Actor (Jerome, aged 9)
1997	Swallowed	Yes	Yes		
1998	Wonderful World	Yes	Yes		
1999	Rabbit	Yes			
2005	Survivors: Flying Blind	Yes			
2008	Donkey Punch	Yes	Yes		
2008	Vinyan		Yes		Director: Fabrice du Welz
2008	Reverb			Yes	Second Unit Director
2010	One Hundred Years of Evil		Yes		
2014	Kristy	Yes			
2014	Glue	Yes			TV series (episodes 1.3 to 1.5)
2015	Endeavour	Yes			TV series (episode 3.4 Coda)
2016	Victoria	Yes			TV series (episodes 1.6 to 1.8)
2017	StartUp	Yes			TV series (episodes 2.1 to 2.5)
2018	The Widow	Yes			TV series (episodes 1.5 to 1.8)
2019	Sanditon	Yes			TV series (episodes 1.1 to 1.3)
2022	Dangerous Liaisons	Yes			TV series (episodes 1.5 to 1.8)

== Awards and nominations ==
Year	Award	Work	Category	Result
1996	Craft Award	To Go	Excellence in Production	Won
1996	Martin Scorsese Post-Production Award, New York University	Swallowed	Film	Won
1997	Telluride International Film Festival Award	Swallowed	Spielberg's Filmmakers of Tomorrow	Nominated
1997	Craft Award, New York University	Swallowed	Excellence in Screenwriting	Won
1997	Craft Award, New York University	Swallowed	Excellence in Direction	Won
1997	Craft Award, New York University	Swallowed	Excellence in Production	Won
1997	Karlovy Vary International Film Festival	Swallowed	Film School Jury Award	Won
1997	Festival of Nations, Ebensee	Swallowed	Silver Bear	Won
1997	Toronto Worldwide Short Film Festival Film Festival	Swallowed	Audience Award	Nominated
1997	Gijón International Film Festival	Swallowed	Short Film Award	Nominated
1998	KinoFilm Manchester International Short Film Festival	Wonderful World	Best British Short Film	Won
1998	Stuttgarter Filmwinter	Swallowed	Jury Prize	Nominated
1999	British Television Advertising Craft Award	Rabbit	Television	Won
1999	UK Creative and Design Award	Portfolio	Best Newcomer	Nominated
2008	Edinburgh International Film Festival	Donkey Punch	The Michael Powell Award for Best British Feature Film	Nominated
2008	Austin Fantastic Fest	Donkey Punch	Horror Features	Won
2008	Amsterdam Fantastic Film Festival	Donkey Punch	Black Tulip Award	Nominated
2008	Amsterdam Fantastic Film Festival	Donkey Punch	Silver Scream Award	Nominated
2008	Sitges Catalonian International Film Festival	Donkey Punch	Méliès d'Argent	Nominated
2015	iHorror Awards	Kristy	Best Sleeper Horror	Nominated

== See also ==
- List of films at the 2008 Sundance Film Festival
- List of horror films of 2007
- List of thriller films of the 2000s
- Warp Films
- Warp X
