= List of horror films set in academic institutions =

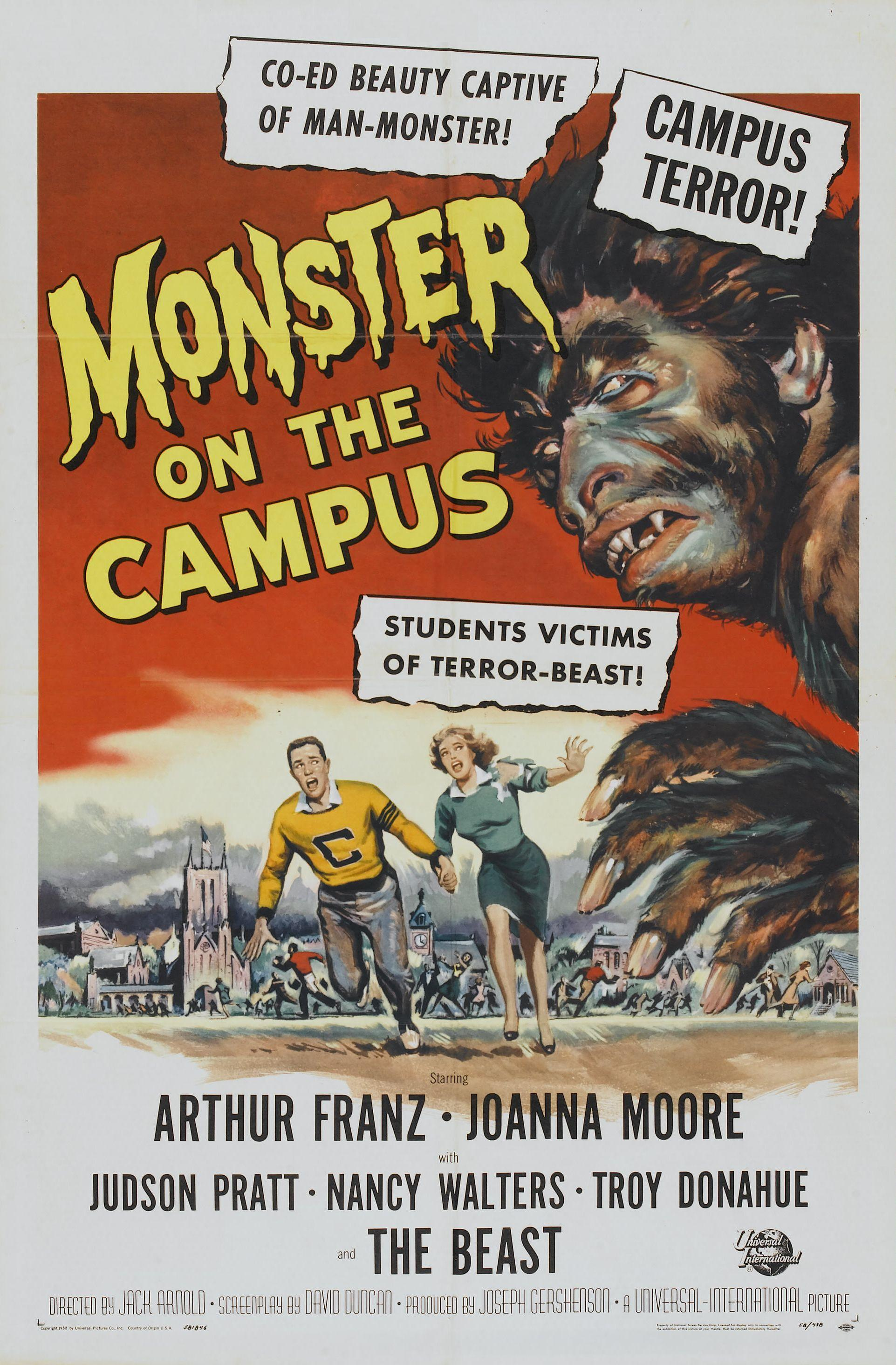
Monster on the Campus (1958) is one of the earlier horror films set on a college campus. (Note: Film scholar Andrew Grunzke notes the influence of Monster on the Campus as both a rendition of Dr. Jekyll and Mr. Hyde as well as a college-set horror film.)

Academic institutions, including high schools, boarding schools, colleges, and university campuses, have historically been recurring settings for horror films. Film scholars have noted the prominence of educational institutions in the development of horror cinema, particularly in the subgenre of the slasher film. Critics such as Andrew Grunzke have cited the themes of bullying, sexuality, social acceptance, parent-child relationships, academic performance, and the development of morality during teenage and young adult life as primary reasons that many horror films have historically used the backdrop of high schools and colleges. Additionally, the universalization of education during the twentieth century, which coincided with the development of the horror film, helped foster a public audience for films set amongst students.

== Colleges and universities ==
=== Campuses ===
Year	Title	Director(s)	Premise	Notes	Ref.
1945	The Body Snatcher	Robert Wise	A college professor and his student find themselves continually harassed by a sadistic cabman to supply bodies.		
1946	The Brute Man	Jean Yarbrough	A college student becomes deformed.		
1957	I Was a Teenage Frankenstein	Herbert L. Strock	A guest professor from England at an American college begins to build his own Frankenstein.		
1958	Monster on the Campus	Jack Arnold	A university professor begins to devolve into a caveman after coming in contact with blood from a coelacanth.		
1962	Burn, Witch, Burn	Sidney Hayers	A college professor is tormented after discovering his wife has been practicing witchcraft.	Originally titled Night of the Eagle	
1981	Final Exam	Jimmy Huston	A man stalks the remaining students on a college campus just before summer vacation.		
1981	Night School	Ken Hughes	A serial killer is stalking and decapitating the women at a Boston night college.	Released in the United Kingdom as Terror Eyes	
1981	The Prowler	Joseph Zito	College students hosting a graduation dance are targeted by a killer in World War II G.I. gear.	Released internationally as Rosemary's Killer	
1981	Strange Behavior	Michael Laughlin	Heinous physiological and psychological experiments are being conducted on high school- and college-age students at the science department of a four-year university in the small Midwestern town of Galesburg.	Also known as Dead Kids, Shadowlands, Small Town Massacre, and Human Experiments; starring Michael Murphy, Louise Fletcher, Dan Shor, Fiona Lewis, and Arthur Dignam	
1982	Girls Nite Out	Robert Deubel	A killer in a bear costume with razored claws murders students during an overnight campus scavenger hunt.	Originally titled The Scaremaker	
1982	The Dorm That Dripped Blood	Stephen Carpenter and Jeffrey Obrow	Students cleaning an abandoned dormitory during Christmas break are stalked by a killer with a baseball bat encrusted in nails.	Released in the United Kingdom as Pranks	
1982	Pieces	Juan Piquer Simón	A serial killer dismembers young women on a Boston college campus with a chainsaw.		
1984	Splatter University	Richard W. Haines	An escaped mental patient terrorizes a local university.		
1985	Blood Cult	Christopher Lewis	A small town sheriff investigates ritualistic murders at the local college.	First direct-to-video horror film	
1988	Fright Night Part 2	Tommy Lee Wallace	Charley Brewster, now a college student, encounters a group of vampires on his campus.		
1989	After Midnight	Jim Wheat and Ken Wheat	A horror anthology film framed through college students taking a course on the "psychology of fear."		
1992	Candyman	Bernard Rose	The film follows Helen Lyle who is a semiotics graduate student completing a thesis on urban legends and folklore at the University of Illinois Chicago. While researching urban legends, she familiarizes herself with Candyman, a spirit who kills anyone that speaks his name five times before a mirror.		
1995	The Addiction	Abel Ferrara	A philosophy graduate student in New York City is bitten by a vampire, which has major implications on her studies and personal life.		
1996	Thesis	Alejandro Amenábar	In November 1995, Ángela, a university student in Madrid, is planning to write a thesis on audiovisual violence and the family. While doing a thesis about violence, Ángela finds a snuff video where a girl is tortured until death. Soon she discovers that the girl was a former student in her faculty....		
1997	Scream 2	Wes Craven	California teenager Sidney Prescott and her friends are stalked by a copycat killer dressed as Ghostface on their college campus in Southern California.		
1998	Urban Legend	Jamie Blanks	A serial killer murders students at a New England college via methods based on urban legends.		
2000	Urban Legends: Final Cut	John Ottman	A killer stalks students of a film school and murders them according to urban legends.		
2000	Anatomy (film)	Stefan Ruzowitzky	A cute med student starts a summer course at Heidelberg University. David's on her dissection table. She met him the day before on the train. Something's wrong.		
2001	Ripper	John Eyres	A massacre survivor believes a Jack the Ripper copycat is stalking her college campus.	Also known as: Ripper: Letter from Hell	
2001	Soul Survivors	Stephen Carpenter	A college student's grip on reality weakens after the death of her boyfriend.		
2002	American Psycho 2	Morgan J. Freeman	An ambitious criminal psychology student resorts to murder vying for a prestigious teaching assistantship.		
2004	Decoys	Matthew Hastings	Two male students vying to lose their virginity suspect the women on campus are not human.		
2005	House of the Dead 2	Michael Hurst	A zombie outbreak occurs on a university campus.		
2011	The Roommate	Christian E. Christiansen	A college student finds that her dormitory roommate is violently dangerous.		
2014	Kristy	Oliver Blackburn	A young woman is pursued by a cybercult of killers while alone on an empty campus during Thanksgiving.		
2015	Chain Mail	Adolfo Alix	A group of people receiving a cryptic and unknown message from the internet, while others are ignoring it. Suddenly imminent danger follows them making them realize that this unknown chain letter is cursed by a demonic creature.		
2017	Happy Death Day	Christopher Landon	A college student is forced to relive her own murder in an endless time loop until she can solve it.		
2018	Truth or Dare	Jeff Wadlow	A group of college friends travel to Mexico before graduation. Playing a game of Truth or Dare awakens a demon that follows them home.		
2019	Happy Death Day 2U	Christopher Landon	A young woman, previously trapped in a loop of her own murder, is transported to another dimension where a killer is on the loose.		
2023	Scream VI	Matt Bettinelli-Olpin, Tyler Gillett	A new Ghostface killer begins targeting the survivors of the Woodsboro murders at Blackmore University in New York City.		

==== Fraternities and sororities ====
Year	Title	Director(s)	Premise	Notes	Ref.
1932	Thirteen Women	George Archainbaud	Thirteen sorority sisters have their futures foreseen by a psychic paid to manipulate them into committing suicide.		
1974	Black Christmas	Bob Clark	Sorority sisters are stalked and harassed by an unseen killer during Christmastime.	See note (Note: Black Christmas (1974) is primarily set inside the confines of a sorority house, though there are several scenes set on the college campus.)	
1976	Sisters of Death	Joseph Mazzuca	A man whose daughter died during a sorority prank takes revenge on the sorority seven years later.		
1978	The Initiation of Sarah	Robert Day	A shy woman with psychic powers joins a college sorority.	Television film	
1980	Terror Train	Roger Spottiswoode	At a university fraternity's New Year's Eve party, a reluctant Alana Maxwell is pressured into a prank: she lures the awkward, virginal pledge Kenny Hampson into a bedroom under the promise of sex. Instead, he discovers a corpse stolen from the medical school in the bed. Traumatized, Kenny is committed to a psychiatric hospital. Three years later, members of the same fraternities and sororities hold a New Year's Eve costume party aboard a train, and they start getting killed one by one by a masked murderer in the train.		
1981	Hell Night	Tom DeSimone	Sorority and fraternity pledges must stay in a reportedly haunted house near their campus.	See note (Note: Though the primary setting of Hell Night (1981) is a manor, the film's broader set is within a university context among college students, and the plot points are rooted in college culture.)	
1983	The House on Sorority Row	Mark Rosman	Sorority sisters are murdered by a killer during their last night in their sorority house.		
1984	The Initiation	Larry Stewart	Sorority pledges are murdered by an unseen assailant during an initiation ritual.		
1984	Silent Madness	Simon Nuchtern	A serial killer returns to the sorority house where he committed previous crimes.		
1986	Killer Party	William Fruet	Sorority pledges are murdered during a party at an abandoned fraternity house.		
1986	Night of the Creeps	Fred Dekker	Alien parasites that turn humans into murderous zombies infiltrate a college fraternity.		
1986	Vamp	Richard Wenk	Two college students hire a stripper for their fraternity party who turns out to be a vampire.		
1986	Sorority House Massacre	Carol Frank	A sorority pledge experiences déjà vu while visiting a sorority house, followed by the appearance of a psychotic killer.		
1987	Blood Sisters	Roberta Findlay	Sorority pledges are forced to spend the night in an abandoned brothel.		
1988	Rush Week	Robert Bralver	A student reporter uncovers a series of murders and disappearances on her college campus.		
1990	Sorority House Massacre II	Jim Wynorski	Five women restoring an old home as their new sorority house are murdered one by one.		
1992	Happy Hell Night	Brian Owens	A psychotic priest stalks pledges during pledge week at a rural college.	Released in the United Kingdom as Frat Night	
2004	The Hazing	Rolfe Kanefsky	Sorority pledges are stalked by a deranged professor during pledge night.	Also released as Dead Scared	
2006	The Initiation of Sarah	Stuart Gillard	Twin sisters with psychic powers join a sorority.	Remake of The Initiation of Sarah (1978)	
2006	Black Christmas	Glen Morgan	Sorority sisters trapped in their sorority home during a Christmas snowstorm are stalked by a serial killer.	Remake of Black Christmas (1974)	
2007	The Haunting of Sorority Row	Bert Kish	A sorority ritual leads to a ghost seeking revenge on sorority members.		
2009	Sorority Row	Stewart Hendler	Sorority sisters graduating from college are stalked after covering up the death of a fellow sorority sister.	Remake of The House on Sorority Row (1983)	
2019	Pledge	Daniel Robbins	Freshman outcasts pledge a fraternity where each task turns increasingly more dangerous and a secret motive is revealed.		
2019	Black Christmas	Sophia Takal	Sorority sisters are targeted by a psychotic killer during Christmas.	Second remake of Black Christmas (1974)	
2020	Initiation	John Berardo	Multiple fraternity brothers are murdered by an unknown assailant, including a sorority sister's brother.		

== Secondary institutions ==
=== Academies ===
Year	Title	Director(s)	Premise	Notes	Ref.
1977	Suspiria	Dario Argento	An American ballerina arrives at a German dance academy plagued by disappearances and deaths.		
1978	Damien – Omen II	Don Taylor	12-year-old Damien Thorn begins to realize his destiny as the Antichrist.		
1991	Child's Play 3	Jack Bender	16-year-old Andy Barclay who is enrolling at Kent Military School, has unknowingly been followed by a revived Chucky, who sets his sight on a younger kid cadet Ronald Tyler.		
2008	The Haunting of Molly Hartley	Mickey Liddell	A teenager struggles at her new preparatory school after her mentally-ill mother attempts to murder her.		

=== Boarding schools ===
Year	Title	Director(s)	Premise	Notes	Ref.
1955	Les Diaboliques	Henri-Georges Clouzot	A woman conspires with her husband's mistress to murder her husband, the principal of a boys' boarding school.	Released in the United States as Diabolique	
1969	The House That Screamed	Narciso Ibáñez Serrador	At a 19th-century boarding school for girls, students have begun to disappear under mysterious circumstances.	Also released as La Residencia.	
1972	Fear in the Night	Jimmy Sangster	A woman is tormented by an assailant at an empty boarding school where her husband has taken a job.		
1973	Satan's School for Girls	David Lowell Rich	A new student at a girls' school suspects her peers of witchcraft.	Television film	
1975	Picnic at Hanging Rock	Peter Weir	The populace of an Australian women's boarding school is shaken by the disappearance of several students.		
1977	The Possessed	Jerry Thorpe	Female students at a boarding school are plagued by satanic forces.	Television film	
1978	Jennifer	Brice Mack	A poor student at an elite boarding school takes revenge on the students who torment her.		
1980	To All a Goodnight	David Hess	A group of girls at a finishing school are murdered by a killer in a Santa Claus suit during Christmas.		
1985	Phenomena	Dario Argento	A girl who can communicate with insects helps solve a series of murders at a boarding school in the Swiss Alps.		
1987	Zombie High	Ron Link	A teenager suspects her boarding school classmates are under a mysterious influence.		
1998	Halloween H20: 20 Years Later	Steve Miner	Laurie Strode, now the principal of a prestigious California boarding school where her son attends, is stalked by her brother, Michael Myers.		
2005	Cry Wolf	Jeff Wadlow	An e-mail chain inspires pranks and potentially murder among students at a rural boarding school.		
2006	The Woods	Lucky McKee	An outcast teenager in 1965 suspects sinister goings-on in the woods surrounding her new boarding school.		
2006	5ive Girls	Warren P. Sonoda	Five delinquent girls are sent to a Catholic boarding school led by a strict headmistress, where they face demonic forces and discover their own latent supernatural powers.		
2011	The Awakening	Nick Murphy	A paranormal debunker arrives at a boys' boarding school to disprove alleged hauntings.		
2012	The Moth Diaries	Mary Harron	A female boarding school student suspects a new peer is a vampire.		
2015	The Blackcoat's Daughter	Oz Perkins	Two young women encounter a mysterious demonic force while alone at their boarding school during a winter break.	Also released as February	

=== High schools ===
Year	Title	Director(s)	Premise	Notes	Ref.
1957	I Was a Teenage Werewolf	Gene Fowler Jr.	A troubled high school student transforms into a werewolf.		
1973	Horror High	Larry N. Stouffer	A shy, yet exceptionally smart student uses a new physically body-altering drug he has invented to wreak havoc on those at his school who have wronged him.		
1976	Carrie	Brian De Palma	A bullied female student unleashes telekinetic powers at her high school prom.		
1976	Massacre at Central High	Rene Daalder	A high school is plagued by revenge killings involving bullied students and their oppressors.		
1978	The Redeemer: Son of Satan	Constantine S. Gochis	A group of people trapped inside their high school during their ten-year reunion are killed off by a psychopath.		
1980	Prom Night	Paul Lynch	A killer stalks the teenagers of a local high school to avenge the death of a young girl years earlier.		
1981	Fear No Evil	Frank LaLoggia	A teenage outcast realizes he is the Antichrist, and seeks revenge against his high school classmates.		
1981	Student Bodies	Mickey Rose	A killer stalks the students of a high school.		
1981	Graduation Day	Herb Freed	The students on a high school track team are stalked and killed leading up to their graduation.		
1981	Happy Birthday to Me	J. Lee Thompson	Students at an upper-class academy are stalked by a killer leading up to a popular student's birthday.		
1982	Wacko	Greydon Clark	A police officer is obsessively investigating a cold case involving a spree killing on Halloween night.		
1984	A Nightmare on Elm Street	Wes Craven	A group of teenagers are targeted by Freddy Krueger, an undead child killer who murders teenagers through their dreams, as retribution against their parents who burned him alive.		
1986	Slaughter High	George Dugdale	Eight people are invited to a ten-year high school reunion by a killer seeking revenge over his disfigurement in a prank gone wrong.		
1987	Hello Mary Lou: Prom Night II	Bruce Pittman	The ghost of a woman killed at her prom in 1957 possesses a current student.		
1987	Return to Horror High	Bill Froelich	The staff of a film company making a movie about real-life murders on location at a high school are stalked and killed.		
1989	Cutting Class	Rospo Pallenberg	A problematic teenager's return to his high school coincides with a string of serial murders.		
1990	Prom Night III: The Last Kiss	Ron Oliver	A high school student meets a female ghost at his high school and begins a relationship with her.		
1996	Scream	Wes Craven	A high school student is stalked by a masked killer who begins murdering her friends.		
1998	Disturbing Behavior	David Nutter	Three outcasts at a Washington high school suspect their too-perfect peers may be under a sinister influence.		
1998	The Faculty	Robert Rodriguez	Students at an Ohio high school suspect an alien life force is taking over their school.		
1999	The Rage: Carrie 2	Katt Shea	An outcast teenager (and half-sister of Carrie White) takes revenge on her tormentors during a high school party.		
2000	Cherry Falls	Geoffrey Wright	A serial killer stalks virgin students at a small-town high school.		
2002	Carrie	David Carson	A female bullying victim unleashes her telekinetic powers during a high school dance.	Television film	
2007	Someone Behind You	Oh-Ki Hwan	A young female student is stalked by a lethal curse, causing her family and friends to attempt to kill her.	Released in the US in 2009, retitled as Voices	
2009	Jennifer's Body	Karyn Kusama	A high school girl must stop her demonically possessed friend from killing her male classmates.		
2013	Carrie	Kimberly Peirce	A female bullying victim unleashes her telekinetic powers during a high school dance.		
2020	Freaky	Christopher Landon	A teenage girl unintentionally switches bodies with a middle-aged male serial killer.		
2022	Scream	Matt Bettinelli-Olpin, Tyler Gillett	A high school student is stalked by a masked killer who begins murdering her friends.		
2024	Lisa Frankenstein	Zelda Williams	A misunderstood teenage girl meets and develops a relationship with a reanimated Victorian era corpse.		
2024	I Saw the TV Glow	Jane Schoenbrun	Two troubled high school students bond over their favorite television show, which drives them to question their reality and identities.		
2025	Slanted	Amy Wang	A Chinese-American teenager undergoes an experimental ethnic modification surgery to try and fit in at school.		
2025	Fear Street: Prom Queen	Matt Palmer	A masked killer targets the prom queen candidates of Shadyside High School on the night of their senior dance.	Released on Netflix.	

== Sources ==
- Benshoff, Harry, ed. (2017). A Companion to the Horror Film. John Wiley and Sons. ISBN 978-1-119-33501-6.
- Grunzke, Andrew L. (2015). Educational Institutions in Horror Film: A History of Mad Professors, Student Bodies, and Final Exams. Springer. ISBN 978-1-137-46920-5.
- Harper, Jim (2004). Legacy of Blood: A Comprehensive Guide to Slasher Movies. Critical Vision. ISBN 978-1-900-48639-2.
- Nowell, Richard (2010). Blood Money: A History of the First Teen Slasher Film Cycle. Bloosmbury. ISBN 978-1-441-18850-2.
- Muir, John Kenneth (2007). Horror Films of the 1970s (Reprint ed.). McFarland. ISBN 978-0-786-43104-5. OCLC 182862677.
- Muir, John Kenneth (2012). Horror Films of the 1980s. Vol. 1. Jefferson, N.C.: McFarland. ISBN 978-0-786-47298-7. OCLC 840902442.
- Newman, Kim (2011). Nightmare Movies: Horror on Screen Since the 1960s (Revised ed.). Bloomsbury. ISBN 978-1-408-81750-6.
- Rockoff, Adam (2002). Going to Pieces: The Rise and Fall of the Slasher Film, 1978-1986. McFarland. ISBN 978-0-786-46932-1.
