= Julia Dreyfus =

Julia Dreyfus may refer to:

- Julia Louis-Dreyfus, American actress most known for her role on the 1990s NBC sitcom Seinfeld
- Julie Dreyfus, French actress and distant relative of the aforementioned actress
