= Donkey Punch (2008 film) =

2008 British film by Olly Blackburn

- Theatrical release poster
- Directed by: Olly Blackburn
- Written by: David Bloom; Olly Blackburn
- Produced by: Mark Herbert; Angus Lamont
- Starring: Robert Boulter; Sian Breckin; Nichola Burley; Tom Burke; Julian Morris; Jaime Winstone
- Cinematography: Nanu Segal
- Edited by: Kate Evans
- Music by: François-Eudes Chanfrault
- Production companies: Warp X; UK Film Council; Film4; Screen Yorkshire; EM Media
- Distributed by: Optimum Releasing
- Release dates: 17 January 2008 (Sundance); 18 June 2008 (United Kingdom)
- Running time: 97 minutes
- Country: United Kingdom
- Language: English
- Budget: £1 million
- Box office: $694,422

Donkey Punch is a 2008 British horror thriller film directed by Olly Blackburn and written by Blackburn and David Bloom. Starring Nichola Burley, Sian Breckin, Tom Burke, Jaime Winstone and Julian Morris, it follows a group of English people on holiday in Spain who end up fighting for their lives.

== Plot ==
While on a holiday in Mallorca, Lisa, Kim, and Tammi meet four young men, Bluey, Josh, Sean, and Marcus. After spending the day at the resort together, the girls are invited to the men's yacht, where they plan to party out at sea. While aboard the boat, they take drugs and the conversation turns to sex, and in particular, types of sexual acts. Bluey describes a sex act called a "donkey punch" which involves the man punching the woman in the back of the head while having doggy style sex in order to increase his sexual pleasure.

Marcus, Bluey, Kim, and Lisa go to the master bedrooms, where they begin having drug-fuelled sex. They are watched by Josh who, known to all involved, lingers furtively in the darkness recording the action with a camera. Bluey, who is copulating with Lisa, asks Josh to film the action and then both of them beckon Josh to have sex with Lisa. Immediately prior to ejaculation and with Bluey's encouragement, Josh donkey punches Lisa but uses excessive force, breaking her neck and killing her instantly. To cover up the incident, the men decide to throw the body overboard while the women want to report it to the authorities, and argument ensues about what to do with the tape. Bluey continually insults Tammi and in a fit of rage, she stabs him in the chest with a knife, and the women escape in the yacht's tender. However, the girls soon realise that the tender's outboard motor is missing (a cut scene shows it still attached to the yacht). In a fit of despair, Tammi fires a flare, attracting the attention of the men. They quickly locate and pick up the women.

As the men attempt to get the women aboard, threatening them with a shotgun, Kim shoots a second flare directly at Marcus. The flare explodes into Marcus's torso and slowly burns him to death. Josh locks the recaptured women in one of the rooms below. Sean asks Josh to "call in" and request medical assistance for Bluey. However, knowing that Bluey still has the tape that contains footage of him dealing the earlier fatal blow, Josh instead decides to discover its whereabouts by torturing Bluey. He does this by withholding pain numbing drugs from him. Bluey reveals the location of the tape, beneath the bed in the state room. Tammi escapes the room by smashing through the glass door and cutting herself, and overhears Bluey mention where the tape is. She frantically roams the boat trying to locate it. She does this just moments before Josh attempts to retrieve it. Unable to find the tape, Josh returns to Bluey, stepping up the torture by turning his attention to the knife which still protrudes from the wound. Josh ultimately takes this too far and, following Bluey's pained protestations that he has already revealed the location, he twists the knife further into the wound before pulling it out, causing Bluey to die.

Sean tries to bring the situation under control by retrieving a shotgun from Josh. He then tries to calm both Josh and Tammi from a frantic argument about the whereabouts of the tape. Kim notices Sean holding a shotgun with Josh and Tammi visibly upset from an adjacent room. She misinterprets his intentions towards Tammi and Josh, and brutally kills Sean with the propeller of an outboard motor. After realizing her mistake, she manically commits suicide by jumping overboard, leaving Josh and Tammi as the only ones left. A distraught Tammi decides that she cannot remain on the boat any longer. Josh agrees, and readies the tender. His plan is to leave the yacht, get back to shore and claim that there was an accident. As Josh pushes the tender away from the yacht, Tammi quietly takes hold of the end of the mooring rope at the stern.

Once the tender has floated some distance from the yacht, Josh pulls his hunting knife from his shorts and points it at Tammi. He demands the incriminating tape from Tammi and, fearing for her life, she obliges, throwing it on the floor of the tender. As a distracted Josh reaches for the tape, Tammi quickly throws the looped end of the mooring rope around his neck. The rope immediately reaches the end of its tether and Josh is wrenched into the sea, snapping his neck and killing him. Tammi, now the sole survivor, fires a distress flare in the hope of being rescued. She then lies down on the tender and morbidly stares up at the night sky, as the raft drifts away into the ocean.

== Cast ==
- Nichola Burley as Tammi
- Jaime Winstone as Kim
- Sian Breckin as Lisa
- Jay Taylor as Marcus
- Tom Burke as Bluey
- Julian Morris as Josh
- Robert Boulter as Sean

== Production ==
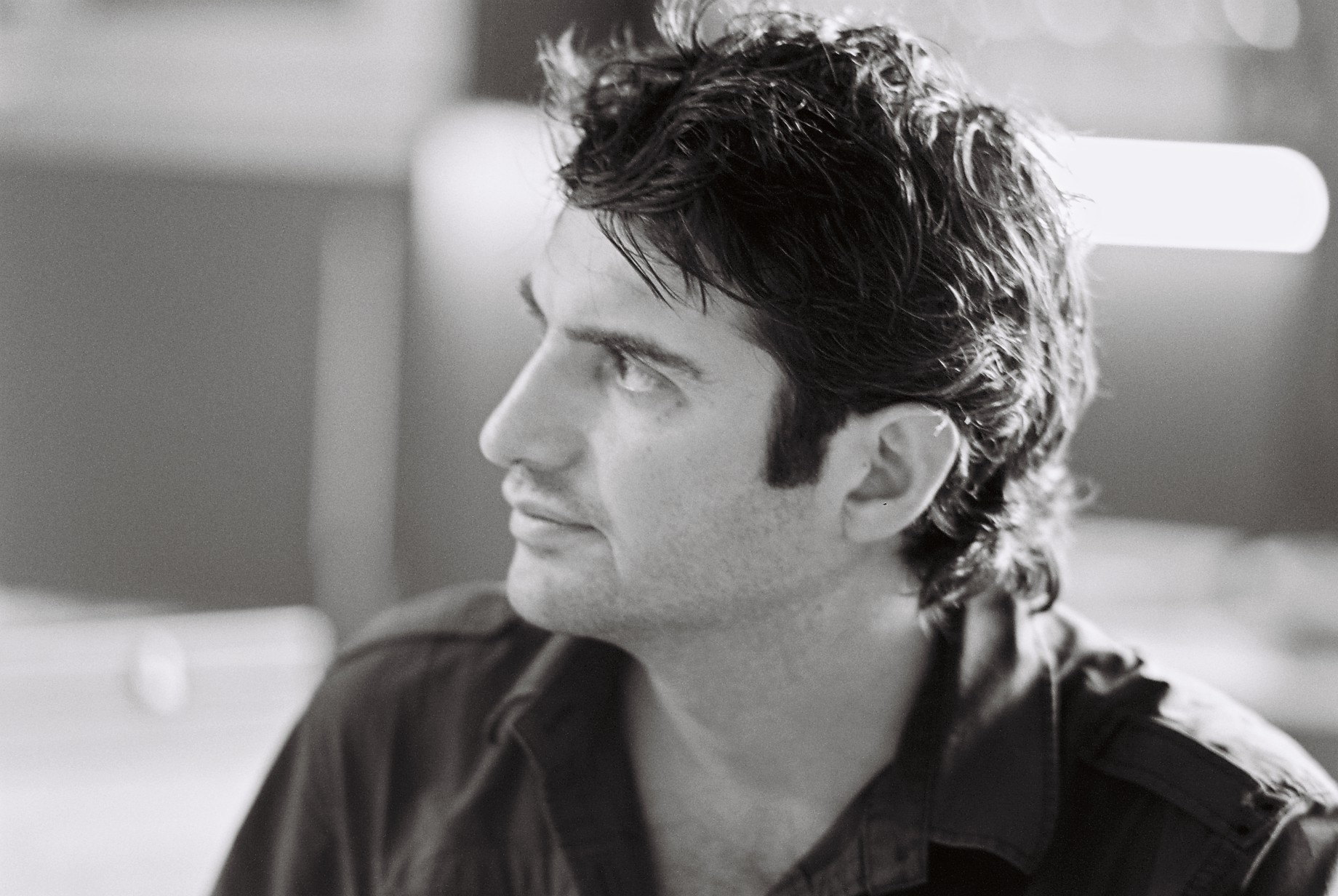
Olly Blackburn, Donkey Punch film director (2012)

=== Influences ===
Blackburn commented that films including those by Nick Love, and The Descent, helped pave the way for Donkey Punch. He stated he was inspired by Sam Peckinpah, Roman Polanski, Straw Dogs, Rosemary's Baby, George A. Romero's Dawn of the Dead and John Carpenter.

The Philadelphia Inquirer compared Blackburn's work to films including filmmaker Peter Berg’s Very Bad Things and director Phillip Noyce’s Dead Calm. The Los Angeles Times additionally compared Blackburn’s work to Dead Calm as well as director Roman Polanski’s Knife in the Water. The A.V. Club observed that the movie appeared similar to Knife In The Water and Dead Calm, but with actors similar to those from The Real World. The San Diego Union-Tribune characterized it as a slasher film. Rex Reed of The New York Observer likened the plot of the film to And Then There Were None by Agatha Christie.

=== Development ===
Filmmaker Olly Blackburn directed Donkey Punch, which he co-wrote with David Bloom. He explained that he was in the offices of production company Warp X discussing television options with company co-founder Robin Gutch when he first thought to make a movie about the topic. He and David Bloom discussed the idea and concept with Warp X management and successfully convinced them to go ahead with the film.

His total budget for the film was £1 million.

In an interview with Total Film, Blackburn commented, "I think Donkey Punch is an extreme thriller or an extreme reality-based thriller. The whole point of the film is it’s grounded in reality." Blackburn wrote that he made Donkey Punch "to try to push the genre."

=== Filming ===
Blackburn's production team went through a casting process which took seven months; the film stars Nichola Burley, Tom Burke, Jaime Winstone and Julian Morris.

Donkey Punch was greenlit by Warp X in February 2007. Blackburn chose to look at filming locations in the Southern Hemisphere owing to greater availability of sunlight that time of year. Film shooting for Donkey Punch began in March 2007. Blackburn shot the film in South Africa, over 24 days. Blackburn decided upon South Africa because of its cost benefit, its support for the movie production, and the availability of skilled film technicians. Cinematography was handled by Nanu Segal.

During production Blackburn had to deal with actors afflicted by hypothermia and tidal surges on location.

== Soundtrack ==
The soundtrack album for Donkey Punch was made available on 28 July 2008, by Warp. The first disc is a compilation of remixes and original tracks performed by various artists, and the second disc is dedicated to composer François-Eudes Chanfrault's score for the film.

Disc one
No.	Title	Performer(s)	Length
1.	"Heartbeats"	The Knife	6:10
2.	"Lead the Way"		0:23
3.	"Young Folks"	Peter Bjorn and John	4:37
4.	"Twin Home"	Plaid	5:09
5.	"We Party on the High Seas"		0:34
6.	"We Are Your Friends"	Justice vs. Simian	4:17
7.	"Shove Piggy Shove"	LFO	4:18
8.	"So Here We Are"	Bloc Party	5:59
9.	"Anyone Heard of a Donkey Punch?"		0:55
10.	"Flip Ya Lid"	Nightmares on Wax	5:26
11.	"Feel Am"	Lindstrøm & Prins Thomas	5:35
12.	"I Am Hardcore"		0:22
13.	"Smokebelch II"	The Sabres of Paradise	4:16
14.	"Before We Begin"	Broadcast	3:20
15.	"Dinner Knife"		0:26
16.	"Lower Your Eyelids to Die with the Sun"	M83	10:37

Disc two
No.	Title	Length
1.	"Harbour, Pt. 1"	3:48
2.	"Harbour, Pt. 2"	6:38
3.	"Harbour, Pt. 3"	4:08
4.	"Leatherman Dinner"	5:24
5.	"Go Panthers"	4:20
6.	"Desperate"	4:00
7.	"Heroes"	4:20

== Release ==
=== Theatrical run ===
Donkey Punch had its world premiere at the 2008 Sundance Film Festival. It was featured among the non-competition titles. The film was Blackburn's first work to be shown at the Sundance Film Festival, where it received a positive reception from the audience in attendance.

It was subsequently shown at film festivals in Seattle, Washington, and Austin, Texas. The Austin American-Statesman recommended it among the "10 Must-See Movies" at Fantastic Fest. It was promoted at Fantastic Fest with a "'Donkey Punch' Boat Party" in honor of the film featuring a screening followed by festivities aboard a ship at Lady Bird Lake.

Donkey Punch was featured in 2008 at the 62nd Edinburgh International Film Festival, where it competed for the Michael Powell Award. It was a featured selection at the Sitges Film Festival, and the Melbourne International Film Festival.

=== Critical reception ===
Donkey Punch is a film that has divided critics since it was released. The review aggregator website Rotten Tomatoes reported a 54% approval rating with an average rating of 5.5/10 based on 52 reviews. The website's consensus reads: "Donkey Punch begins as a promising thriller, but loses credibility while adhering too closely to genre conventions." Metacritic, which uses a weighted average, assigned the film a score of 43 out of 100, based on 12 critics, indicating "mixed or average" reviews.

The Guardian described it as "expertly made and painfully tense; a bracing cold snap blowing in off the ocean." In Empire Kim Newman called it "the sexiest most shocking thriller of the year". Other parts of the British press saw less controversy. Elsewhere in the British press, The Times called the film "a notable achievement in all departments, handled superbly by its first-time director and largely unknown cast, with a tight, frighteningly plausible script. ... Donkey Punch has a respect for formula but, more importantly, a commitment to doing things differently, and properly. A scary, truly edgy film."

Stephen Holden's review in The New York Times said: "There is no transcendent agent of evil; the enemy is within ... the movie remains above the typical splatter ’n’ scream fest. These careless hedonists are convincing, and the ensemble acting feels believable." Aint it cool news's Harry Knowles said: "Damn I fucking loved it." Rex Reed wrote a review of Donkey Punch for The New York Observer and called it a "slaughterfest" and "the newest footnote in the history of pretty-girls-in-peril pictures". Wesley Morris reviewed the film for The Boston Globe, and commented: "The naughtiness turns nasty, the nastiness turns fatal, and the kids gradually turn against each other. ... And the alive-to-dead pecking order is strictly a horror film convention: The soberer and more virginal you are the better your chances."

Writing in the New York Press, Eric Kohn said "Such a unique thrill. Director Blackburn develops the scenario with remarkably shrewd finesse and builds to a satisfying spectacle." The Village Voice called it "A Knife in the Water for the era of Ugly Briton, package tour imperialism." In a review which graded Donkey Punch a "B", the Boston Herald called the film "dirty, nasty fun", while criticising its lack of originality. The Philadelphia Inquirer wrote, "Donkey Punch offers a gripping mix of sexual heat and nasty menace." The Los Angeles Times concluded, Donkey Punch isn't without a certain power as it gleefully turns its careless hedonists into caged, paranoid rats." The A.V. Club gave the film a grade of C+ and wrote that the director, "sustains a tense mood of mistrust, sexual rivalry, and shifting alliances", but lamented that "the film goes off the rails in the final third, sacrificing subtle character work at the altar of blood-and-guts survival horror. As mood-killers go, it's like a jab to the back of the neck."

The Philadelphia Weekly review called the film "an odious little potboiler". Long Beach Press-Telegram called the film a predictable thriller. A review in The San Diego Union-Tribune concluded, "What began as a fairly interesting girls-gone-wild picture becomes just another gorefest with lingering close-ups of wounds and knives being extracted." Though the San Francisco Chronicle called Donkey Punch an "interesting but flawed indie thriller", it determined the final act was "annoyingly routine". Contra Costa Times gave the film a grade of "C" and described it as unoriginal suspense. The Seattle Times called Donkey Punch a "lurid thriller", and was critical of its plot progression towards the middle of the film. The Kitsap Sun described the film as "a nasty, dirty little movie". Though lamenting the predictability of the film's plot, the review offered an instruction for potential viewers, "Prediction isn’t the point, because you know the final score’s going to be 1. The point is to just sit back, if you’re so disposed and not easily offended, and gleefully watch all the nasty, dirty little business go down."

=== Home media ===
Donkey Punch was released on DVD on 10 November 2008. It was shown on British TV on the Film 4 channel on 14 December 2013. It was released on DVD in the US on 7 April 2009.

== See also ==
- 2009 in film
- Fantastic Fest (2008)
- List of drug films
- List of films at the 2008 Sundance Film Festival
- List of horror films of 2007
- List of thriller films of the 2000s
- Warp Films
