= Vinyan =

2008 drama horror film

- Theatrical poster
- Directed by: Fabrice du Welz
- Written by: Fabrice du Welz; Oliver Blackburn; David Greig
- Produced by: Cédric Jimenez; Nadia Khamlichi; Adrian Politowski
- Starring: Emmanuelle Béart; Rufus Sewell; Julie Dreyfus
- Cinematography: Benoît Debie
- Edited by: Colin Monie
- Music by: François-Eudes Chanfrault
- Production companies: The Film; Film4; Wild Bunch
- Distributed by: Wild Bunch Distribution (France)
- Release date: 30 August 2008 (Venice Film Festival)
- Running time: 96 minutes
- Countries: France; Belgium; United Kingdom; Australia
- Language: English

Vinyan is a 2008 drama horror film directed and co-written by Fabrice du Welz and starring Emmanuelle Béart, Rufus Sewell, and Julie Dreyfus. The film premiered at the Venice Film Festival on 30 August 2008.

== Plot ==
Jeanne and Paul are a wealthy couple who lost their son, Joshua, in the Boxing Day Christmas tsunami of 2004. Six months later, having stayed over in Thailand, they view a film at an orphanage fund-raiser made by Kimberly Park, just back from the Andaman Coast, of Moken and Salone natives in the South Tanintharyi division. A restricted area only accessible by boats through a triad of Thaksin Gao who has military ties that smuggles girls to bars in Myanmar. Jeanne sees a vague figure in the distance she believes to be Joshua. Discouraged by Jeanne's lead, Paul gives in to contacting the triad's leader Thaksin Gao and hiring one of his boats for an exorbitant 'one-time' fee. At first taken to a false decoy in the Mergui Archipelago where male orphans, the females not present, cast balloons at night to ward of the vinyan spirits, the French couple is further misled, as indicated by pointing on a map, to an uninhabited island south of Macleod Island (west of Zadetkale Island) where, their resources depleted, find themselves equally lost in a region of lost male orphans.

== Cast ==
- Emmanuelle Béart as Jeanne Bellmer
- Rufus Sewell as Paul Bellmer
- Petch Osathanugrah as Thaksin Gao
- Julie Dreyfus as Kim

== Release ==
The film had its world premiere at the Venice Film Festival on 30 August 2008. In North America, the film premiered at the Toronto International Film Festival on 5 September 2008. It was released to DVD on 7 April 2009.

== Reception ==
On Rotten Tomatoes, Vinyan has an aggregated score of 53% based on 19 reviews.

David Jenkins of Time Out said the film is "a menacing pseudo-horror thriller with arty aspirations". He also gave praise to Béart, saying she "supplies a dose of credibility to a tale that not only gets less compelling and plausible as it goes on, but becomes side-tracked by odd musings on motherhood and death." In contrast, Andrew Pulver of The Guardian wrote, "Du Welz never manages to generate enough menace – this is no Apocalypse Now – and the film never really solves the dubious plot anchor of westerners terrorised by anonymous Asiatics." Richard Corliss of Time heavily criticized the film, calling it "an affront to cinematic decency".
