= Born Equal =

2006 television film directed by Dominic Savage

- Written by: Dominic Savage
- Directed by: Dominic Savage
- Starring: Robert Carlyle; Colin Firth; David Oyelowo; Peter O'Connor; Nicholas Burns; Anne-Marie Duff; Emilia Fox
- Theme music composer: Rupert Gregson-Williams
- Country of origin: United Kingdom
- Original language: English

Production
- Producers: Ruth Caleb; Lucy Hillman
- Cinematography: Danny Cohen
- Editor: David G. Hill
- Running time: 83 minutes

Original release
- Network: BBC One
- Release: 17 December 2006

Born Equal is a television film produced for the BBC. Written and directed by Dominic Savage, it stars Colin Firth, Robert Carlyle, David Oyelowo, Anne-Marie Duff and Emilia Fox, and explores aspects of poverty, race, inequality, homelessness, immigration and class in modern Britain by following the stories – at times intertwining – of several people living in London.

== Plot ==
City banker Mark (Colin Firth) lives with his pregnant wife Laura (Emilia Fox) in a large house in an upper-middle-class neighbourhood. Although he has just made a fortune in a financial deal, Mark refuses to give money to a beggar in an underground station, but later regrets this behaviour and begins to feel guilty about his success and opulent lifestyle. Another day, he returns to find the homeless man and gives him 100 pounds. Mark then resolves to use his wealth to help the indigent and volunteer as an outreach worker. As the film develops, it becomes clear that his newfound concern for the poor is also a form of escapism from his materialistic wife, and that he feels trapped and frightened by his life.

Robert, a convicted murderer, is released from prison and moves into a hostel in Swiss Cottage. There, he meets the pregnant Michelle, who has been relocated with her young daughter by a social worker to protect them from her abusive husband. Robert and Michelle form a relationship, while Robert continues looking for his mother whom he has not seen for many years.

In the hostel also lives a Nigerian immigrant family – journalist Yemi (David Oyelowo), his wife Itshe (Nikki Amuka-Bird), and their daughter. Yemi works as kitchen help in a restaurant and Itshe as a house cleaner. They desperately need to raise 5,000 pounds to bring Yemi's father from Nigeria to London, before the political gangs who forced them into emigrating kill him.

Mark begins to collaborate with Sally (Julia Davis), the social worker working for the homeless charity and who placed Michelle in the hostel, and helps to allot 17-year-old Zoe (Nichola Burley), who has run away from her abusive stepfather, a room there. He soon becomes very close to the teenager. One night at the hostel, Zoe kisses him, but he rejects her advances and returns home to his wife, who seems distraught by his absences and is convinced that he is having an affair.

Robert finds out that his mother died while he was in prison and breaks off his relationship with Michelle.

Mark and Laura manage to settle their differences in a restaurant: he explains the reasons of his being away and apologises for having been so cruel in his neglect. While driving home after the dinner out, Mark almost hits Robert, who is walking back to the hostel. Enraged by the near-accident, Robert follows them and stabs Mark to death when he comes to the door.

== Cast ==
=== Main ===
- Robert Carlyle as Robert
- Colin Firth as Mark
- Anne-Marie Duff as Michelle
- Emilia Fox as Laura
- David Oyelowo as Yemi
- Nikki Amuka-Bird as Itshe
- Anne-Marie Bossman as Adanna, Yemi and Itshe's daughter
- Julia Davis as Sally
- Nichola Burley as Zoe

=== Additional ===
- Peter O'Connor as hostel manager
- Nicholas Burns as Michael, Mark's friend
- Pearce Quigley as beggar 1
- Gemma Barrett as Danielle, Michelle's daughter
- Charlie Creed-Miles as man in hostel
- Megan Dodds as Anastasia, Itshe's employer
- Toby Kebbell as beggar 2
- Antonio Pelayo as kitchen cleaner
- Chris Wilson Police Officer
- Joanne Adams as shop assistant
- Emily Woof as Rita, Robert's mother's employee
- Ria Haydon as midwife

== Production ==
Since Born Equal was commissioned to mark the 45th anniversary of Ken Loach's Cathy Come Home, it started as a film about homelessness. But as the project developed, director Dominic Savage decided to broaden his focus and deal with social inequality: "I knew then that one of the issues I really wanted to deal with was the extremes of difference in people's lives – and, in a place like London, those extremes can be experienced within just a few streets. People can be in hugely different worlds but sharing the same space." The working titles were London, The London Project and To Have and Have Not. The film was neither scripted nor rehearsed: all the actors had to improvise on set, a method Dominic Savage considers "the most organic way of making a film but also the most risky (...)".
