= Truckers (2013 TV series) =

- Genre: Drama
- Written by: William Ivory
- Directed by: Sheree Folkson (First 3 eps); Sue Tully (Last 2 eps)
- Starring: Stephen Tompkinson; Sian Breckin; John Dagleish; Jenn Murray; Harry Treadaway; Ashley Walters; Ray Ashcroft
- Composer: Tim Phillips
- Country of origin: United Kingdom
- Original language: English
- No. of series: 1
- No. of episodes: 5 (list of episodes)

Production
- Executive producers: Steve Lightfoot; John Yorke; William Ivory; Polly Hill
- Producer: Faye Dorn
- Production location: Nottingham
- Cinematography: Tony Slater Ling
- Running time: 60 minutes
- Production company: Company Pictures

Original release
- Network: BBC One; BBC One HD
- Release: 10 October – 7 November 2013

Truckers is a five-part British television drama first broadcast on BBC One on 10 October 2013. The series is about Britain through the lives of truck drivers working in Nottingham, and was written by William Ivory.

== Cast ==
The cast of Truckers

- Stephen Tompkinson as Malachi Davies
- Sian Breckin as Wendy Newman
- John Dagleish as Martin Banks
- Jenn Murray as Michelle Truss
- Harry Treadaway as Glen Davies
- Ashley Walters as Steven "Steve" Warley
- Ray Ashcroft as Bob
- Charlotte Atkinson as Andrea
- Trevor Atkinson Action Vehicle Driver
- Terry Connor Action Vehicle Driver
- Miffy Smith Artic and Trailer Driver
- Andrew Howells Artic and trailer Driver
- Martin Meden Action Vehicle Driver
- Cliff Bradley Action Vehicle Driver
- All Vehicle Modifications carried out by Wayne Ridel @ Anglo American Filming.

== Production ==
The series was announced on 11 January 2012 by Ben Stephenson, controller of drama commissioning at the BBC at the Broadcasting Press Guild lunch. The drama was commissioned with Danny Cohen.

== Episodes ==
No.	Title	Directed by	Original release date	UK viewers (millions)
1	"Episode 1"	Sheree Folkson	10 October 2013	2.88 (overnight)
Episode centres on the life of Malachi Davies Guest starring: Maggie O'Neill, Ben Heathcote, Katherine Dow Blyton, Sacha Parkinson and Marc Ryan-Jordan
2	"Episode 2"	Sheree Folkson	17 October 2013	2.25 (overnight)
Episode centres on the life of Martin Banks. Guest starring: Stephen Bent, Wendy Morgan and Lauren Carse
3	"Episode 3"	Sheree Folkson	24 October 2013	2.31 (overnight)
Episode centres on the life of Steven "Steve" Warley. Guest starring: Wunmi Mosaku, Kiano Samuels, Lisa Marged, Dasharn Anderson, Marianne McIvor, Jamie Michie, Victoria Elliott, David Wilson and Edward Neeson
4	"Episode 4"	Sue Tully	31 October 2013	2.10 (overnight)
Episode centres on the life of Wendy Newman Guest starring: Marian McLoughlin, Ian Peck, Kenneth Collard, Sean McKenzie and Elliot Levey
5	"Episode 5"	Sue Tully	7 November 2013	2.37 (overnight)
Guest starring: Pooky Quesnel, Camille Ucan, Neil Fitzmaurice and Sharlene Whyte

== Reception ==
=== Ratings ===
Overnight figures showed that the first episode on 10 October 2013 was watched by 13.5% of the viewing audience for that time, with 2.88 million watching it. The second, third, fourth and fifth episodes were watched by 10.6%, 11.0%, 10.4% and 11.4% of the viewing audience respectively.

=== Critical reception ===
David Butcher of Radio Times said the following about the first episode: "The trouble is, none of it makes a lot of sense, and the long, colourful speeches that writer William Ivory gives Tompkinson can’t save the drama from clattering oddness." Sarah Rainey, writing for The Daily Telegraph gave it four out of five stars, called it a "bitter-sweet offering" and said: "The script offered a good mix of humour and poignancy, and there were also some unexpectedly lovely scenes of the countryside". Ellen Jones of The Independent said: "The laboriously regional script didn't make it any easier. The dialogue was so crammed with earthy wisdom and quaint sexual euphemisms that the actors struggled to get a breath in." and "Truckers' debt to films such as Brassed Off and The Full Monty was made obvious".

== International broadcasters ==
In Australia the series premiered on 23 April 2015 on BBC First.

== Home media ==
The DVD edition was released on 3 February 2014.
