= List of films at the 2008 Sundance Film Festival =

The following films were shown at the 2008 Sundance Film Festival.

== Documentary Competition ==
- An American Soldier
- American Teen
- Bigger, Stronger, Faster*
- Fields of Fuel
- Flow: For Love of Water
- Gonzo: The Life and Work of Dr. Hunter S. Thompson
- The Greatest Silence: Rape in the Congo
- I.O.U.S.A.
- Nerakhoon (The Betrayal)
- The Order of Myths
- Patti Smith: Dream of Life
- Roman Polanski: Wanted and Desired
- Secrecy
- Slingshot Hip Hop
- Traces of the Trade: A Story from the Deep North
- Trouble the Water

== Dramatic Competition ==
- American Son
- Anywhere, U.S.A.
- Ballast
- Choke
- Downloading Nancy
- Frozen River
- Good Dick
- The Last Word
- The Mysteries of Pittsburgh
- North Starr
- Phoebe in Wonderland
- Pretty Bird
- Sleep Dealer
- Sugar
- Sunshine Cleaning
- The Wackness

== World Cinema Documentary Competition ==
- Alone in Four Walls (Germany)
- The Art Star and the Sudanese Twins (New Zealand)
- Be Like Others (Canada, United Kingdom, U.S.A., Iran)
- A Complete History of My Sexual Failures (United Kingdom)
- Derek (United Kingdom)
- Dinner with the President (Pakistan)
- Durakovo: The Village of Fools (France)
- In Prison My Whole Life (United Kingdom)
- Man on Wire (United Kingdom)
- Puujee (Japan)
- Recycle (Jordan)
- Stranded: I've Come from a Plane that Crashed in the Mountains (France)
- Triage: Dr. James Orbinski's Humanitarian Dilemma (Canada)
- Up the Yangtze (Canada)
- The Women of Brukman (Canada)
- Yasukuni (Japan, China)

== World Cinema Dramatic Competition ==
- Absurdistan (Germany, Azerbaijan)
- Blue Eyelids' (Mexico)
- Captain Abu Raed (Jordan)
- The Drummer (Hong Kong, Taiwan, Germany)
- Good Morning Heartache (Italy)
- I Always Wanted to Be a Gangster (France)
- Just Another Love Story (Denmark)
- King of Ping Pong (Sweden)
- Máncora (Spain, Peru)
- Megane (Japan)
- Mermaid (Russia)
- Perro Come Perro (Colombia)
- Under the Bombs (Lebanon)
- The Wave (Germany)
- The Wind and the Water (Panama)

== Premieres ==
- Assassination of a High School President
- Be Kind Rewind
- CSNY Déjà Vu
- The Deal
- Death in Love
- Diminished Capacity
- The Escapist
- The Great Buck Howard
- The Guitar
- Hamlet 2
- Henry Poole is Here
- In Bruges
- Incendiary
- The Merry Gentleman
- A Raisin in the Sun
- Savage Grace
- Sleepwalking
- Smart People
- Towelhead
- Transsiberian
- U2 3D
- The Visitor
- What Just Happened
- The Year of Getting to Know Us
- The Yellow Handkerchief

== Spectrum ==
- Anvil! The Story of Anvil
- The Black List
- Kicking It
- The Linguists
- Made in America
- Where in the World is Osama Bin Laden?
- Young@Heart
- August
- Baghead
- Birds of America
- Blind Date
- Bottle Shock
- Chronic Town
- Goliath
- A Good Day to Be Black and Sexy
- Love Comes Lately
- Momma's Man
- Quid Pro Quo
- Red

== Park City at Midnight ==
- Adventures of Power
- The Brøken
- Donkey Punch
- Funny Games
- George A. Romero's Diary of the Dead
- Hell Ride
- Otto; or, Up with Dead People
- Timecrimes

== Sundance Collection ==
- Edward II
- The Living End

== New Frontier ==
- Seven Intellectuals in Bamboo Forest, Parts 4 and 5
- casting a glance
- Eat, for This Is My Body
- Fear(s) of the Dark
- Half-Life
- Reversion
