= A Feast at Midnight =

- Directed by: Justin Hardy
- Written by: Justin Hardy; Yoshi Nishio
- Produced by: Yoshi Nishio; Jonathan Hercock
- Starring: Christopher Lee; Robert Hardy; Edward Fox; Freddie Findlay; Aled Roberts; Julie Dreyfus
- Cinematography: Tim Maurice-Jones
- Edited by: Michael Johns
- Music by: David Hughes; John Murphy
- Release dates: November 1994 (London Film Festival); 26 May 1995 (UK)
- Running time: 105 minutes
- Country: United Kingdom
- Language: English

A Feast at Midnight is a 1994 British comedy family film directed by Justin Hardy and starring Christopher Lee, Freddie Findlay, Robert Hardy, Samuel West, Edward Fox and Julie Dreyfus. The film is notable for being the feature film debut of future Conservative politician Michael Gove, as the chaplain.

== Plot ==
Dryden Park, a prep school in the remote English countryside, welcomes a new boy, Magnus Gove (Freddie Findlay) whose father is convalescing in Paris, and whose mother has a new life elsewhere. Magnus, a small boy with no sporting aspirations, is immediately targeted by Bathurst and other bullies, getting no support from his housemaster, professor Longfellow (Christopher Lee), who is the sports master and "Raptor" to the students. The headmaster is sympathetic however, no doubt appreciative of another paying pupil.

Magnus seeks solace in letters from his father (Edward Fox), with whom he shares a love of fine food, but the school follows a strict diet, so Magnus organizes two fellow-victims into a secret society, "The Scoffers", (Note: Partly an homage to Auguste Escoffier, but mostly from the verb "scoff" — to consume voraciously.) who invade the (out of bounds) school kitchen after "lights out" to prepare sweet treats and consume their handiwork. Raptor and the cook know something is afoot but fail to catch the culprits.

Others have their own guilty secrets, which help to complicate things - the headmaster has a fondness for peanut butter sandwiches as a late night snack, and Raptor and Miss Plunder, the house mother, have their own private parties. Both entail sneak visits to the kitchen.

One by one other boys are inducted into the "Scoffers", and they become more audacious as their cooking proficiency increases, culminating in a midnight birthday party for nurse Charlotte, Raptor's painfully shy but beautiful daughter. The party, at the school's indoor pool, is interrupted by the class bully, and by Raptor, who is furious, ordering his daughter back to her room. Outraged, she finally rebels.

In the final scene Magnus is picked up by his beloved father; they plot gastronomic adventures. Charlotte is hitch-hiking her way to London – or anywhere. Raptor has married Miss Plunder and softened somewhat – he gave his daughter a small wad of banknotes as a parting gift.

== Cast ==
- Christopher Lee - V. E. 'Raptor' Longfellow
- Robert Hardy - Headmaster
- Edward Fox - Father
- Freddie Findlay - Magnus Gove
- Stuart Hawley - Bathurst
- Aled Roberts - Goff
- Andrew Lusher - Tava
- Samuel West - Chef
- Carol MacReady - Miss Plunder
- Lisa Faulkner - Miss Charlotte
- Julie Dreyfus - Mother
- Michael Gove - Chaplain
- Brian Cant - Mr. Hill
- Sebastian Armesto - Oberoi
- Mathew Blakiston - Merriman

== Release ==
The film was shown at the London Film Festival in November 1994.

== Reception ==
Empire said of the film: "Nothing about it suggests that it should have been made for the big screen, so modest is its scope."

== Home media ==
A Feast at Midnight has been released in Australia as a DVD by Flashback Entertainment.
