= Papa lumière =

- Theatrical release poster
- Directed by: Ada Loueilh
- Written by: Ada Loueilh
- Produced by: François Kraus; Denis Pineau-Valencienne; Michaël Goldberg; Boris Van Gils
- Starring: Niels Arestrup
- Cinematography: Laurent Brunet
- Edited by: Julia Gregory
- Music by: François-Eudes Chanfrault
- Production company: Les Films du Kiosque
- Distributed by: Le Pacte
- Release date: July 29, 2015
- Running time: 83 minutes
- Country: France
- Language: French
- Budget: $4 million
- Box office: $39,000

Papa lumière is a French drama film directed by Ada Loueilh.

== Plot ==
Charles de Gaulle Airport, in April 2011. Jacques and Safi landed in Abidjan, where they were repatriated urgently. He has old leather tanned by Africa and he is expat life hotelier. She, her mixed race daughter of 14 years, has become accustomed to live with her mother and does not know what to think of this big mouth and crappy father who embarked with him once. Moved to a reception center in Nice, they will learn to look, to know, to love, perhaps. But there Gloria, too, the mother of Safi, left in turmoil of Abidjan and unreachable ...

== Cast ==
- Niels Arestrup as Jacques
- Julia Coma as Safi
- Natacha Lindinger as Elyane
- Bruno Todeschini as Guy
- Jennifer Tie Lou as Gloria
- Venantino Venantini as The hotelkeeper
- Sabine Pakora as The matron
- Sylvie Mauté as the humanitarian
