= One Hundred Years of Evil =

- Poster
- Directed by: Erik Eger; Magnus Oliv
- Written by: Erik Eger; Magnus Oliv; Olly Blackburn; Joacim Starander
- Produced by: Erik Eger; Magnus Oliv; Joacim Starander; Jonas Kellagher; André Robert Lee
- Starring: Jon Rekdal; Jordi Almeida; Alexander Bareis; Lucy Bermingham; Jack Frankel; Andrea Sooch
- Cinematography: Julián Elizalde
- Edited by: Marie Kjellson; Björn Lindgren
- Music by: Joacim Starander
- Production companies: Golden Eagle Movies; Eight Millimetres
- Distributed by: T2 Entertainment
- Release dates: November 20, 2010 (Sweden); July 19, 2011 (United States)
- Running time: 90 minutes
- Countries: Sweden; United States
- Language: English

One Hundred Years of Evil is a 2010 mockumentary positing the possibility that Adolf Hitler, dictator of Nazi Germany, did not commit suicide at the end of World War II in Europe, in 1945. The film was directed by Erik Eger and Magnus Oliv, who also wrote the screenplay, along with Olly Blackburn and Joacim Starander. Starring actors include Jon Rekdal, Jordi Almeida, Alexander Bareis, Lucy Bermingham, Jack Frankel and Andrea Sooch.

The film was screened as an official selection at the 2010 Stockholm International Film Festival, the 2011 Fantasia International Film Festival, and the 2011 International Film Festival Rotterdam. It received a generally positive reception from reviewers including Fangoria, Ain't It Cool News, IndieWire, and the Montreal Gazette. Cinemagazine compared the film to Zelig by filmmaker Woody Allen, and a review for the Fantasia International Film Festival likened it to Forgotten Silver by director Peter Jackson.

== Plot ==
The film is a mockumentary which examines the possibility that Adolf Hitler did not commit suicide at the end of World War II in 1945. It centers around historian Skule Antonsen of Sweden (Jon Rekdal) who along with film director Idelfonso Elizalde of Spain (Julián Elizalde) investigates Adolf Munchenhauser (Dick Nilsson). Munchenhauser is an individual who bears a striking resemblance to Hitler, and he was taken captive in Berlin in 1945 by the Allies and was one of 13 men transported on board a U.S. cargo plane who all happen to appear similar in appearance to Hitler. After gaining freedom in 1946 from captivity in a facility called Camp Rebecca located in the Great Basin Desert, Munchenhauser chose to remain in the United States. Skule researches evidence surrounding Munchenhauser's activities in an effort to authenticate whether or not he is indeed Hitler. During the course of his investigation, Skule's research efforts are stymied by unknown individuals.

== Production ==
=== Development ===
Erik Eger, Magnus Oliv and Joacim Starander were inspired by films including Zelig by director Woody Allen and F for Fake by filmmaker Orson Welles. In a 2011 interview for the Fantasia International Film Festival, filmmaker Erik Eger observed, "The basis of the story is a bit about what's true in media and news today. Today we are bombarded by more messages than ever, I think. And it's pretty easy for the forces behind the media and the news to make us believe almost anything. And of course what we believe makes us into who we are. And we just felt a need to do something on this theme. And it evolved into this crazy story about Adolf Munchenhauser, who might have been Adolf Hitler, we don't know."

=== Filming ===
One Hundred Years of Evil was produced as an independent low-budget film. Members of the production staff routinely resided in the crew's van due to insufficient funding for overnight accommodations while filming on location.

== Release ==
The film was shown at the Stockholm International Film Festival in November 2010. Its North American film premiere took place at the Fantasia International Film Festival on 19 July 2011. The film was an official selection at the 2011 International Film Festival Rotterdam.

== Reception ==
The film received a positive review from Fangoria, "Going into One Hundred Years of Evil expecting a deadpan, seriously played piece of alternate history is a mistake, because Erik Eger and Magnus Oliv's movie is as comedic as faux journalism can get. Made for next-to-no money, it accumulates goofy jokes and clever twists of historical revisionism, while succeeding in its concept with a sheer dose of inventiveness and enthusiasm." The review praised the performance of Jon Rekdal as Skule Antonsen. Ecrans noted, "There's much fun." The film received one and a half stars out of five in a critical review from Luuk Imhann in Cinemagazine, who compared it to the film Zelig by Woody Allen. Ain't It Cool News gave the film a positive review, "Part comedy, part absurdist faux-history lesson, Skule's quest to find the truth is fascinating from beginning to end. Sometimes I was wondering if I was watching an actual documentary, which I think, is the ultimate compliment for directors Erik Eger & Magnus Oliv. If you're looking for a twisted take on alternative history, One Hundred Years of Evil is a sure thing."

One Hundred Years Of Evil is [a] hilariously mind-bending experience of historical revisionism.

— Stockholm International Film Festival

Associate Editor of Flixist Alec Kubas-Meyer observed, "Unfortunately, One Hundred Years of Evil suffers from a pretty major identity crisis. It doesn't know whether it wants to be a mockumentary or a found footage film." Writing for Man, I Love Films, Thaddeus Zwolfe commented, "Erik Eger and Magnus Oliv direct a movie that plays its premise and thesis beautifully. This picture does a great job of looking like the narrative moments were shot by a grad-level cameraman; beautiful scenes combine with excellent composition (the sunset shot is especially pretty), and the camera itself is a character with its own personality. The directors co-wrote with Joacim Starander and Olly Blackburn, and they conceived a smart picture." Serena Donadoni gave the film a grade of "B" in a review for IndieWire, writing, "Blurring the demarcations of reality and fiction, 'One Hundred Years of Evil' transforms established history into subjective truthiness."

Stockholm International Film Festival characterized the film noting, "One Hundred Years Of Evil is [a] hilariously mind-bending experience of historical revisionism." In a review for the Fantasia International Film Festival, Mitch Davis wrote, " Swedish co-directors Erik Eger and Magnus Oliv have pulled off something mighty impressive here, a film that plays both as a falsified doc narrative and a surprising process-of-discovery thriller, complete with the occasional action sequence!" Davis likened the film to Forgotten Silver by director Peter Jackson. Liz Ferguson of Montreal Gazette called the film a "skilful mockumentary", and went on to note, "Directors Erik Eger and Magnus Oliv have a field day here. They riff on conspiracy theories, cover-ups, things that are supposedly proven by computer analysis, the lone obsessive who clearly sees what others refuse to admit, people who enjoy sharing anecdotes from their past, anecdotes they've probably told many many times by now, filmmakers who make themselves part of the story, etc., etc." A review by Justine Smith of Sound on Sight was negative, specifically criticizing the choice of film as a medium to tell the story, "As many mockumentaries do, this film suffers due to its length and adhering far too closely to the model it is mocking. The flaw lies largely in the exploitative model itself, whose redundant and circular form favours the channel hopping home audience. The film might have actually succeeded better as a television series."

== See also ==
- Hitler – Dead or Alive
- Hitler's Children
- The Strange Death of Adolf Hitler (film)
- The Hitler Gang
