= Edge of Summer =

- Film poster
- Directed by: Lucy Cohen
- Written by: Lucy Cohen
- Produced by: Julia Nottingham; Ariadne Kotsaki
- Starring: Flora Hylton; Joel Sefton-Iongi; Josie Walker; Nichola Burley; Steffan Rhodri
- Cinematography: Rachel Clark
- Edited by: Michael Aaglund
- Music by: Hutch Demouilpied
- Production companies: Dorothy St Pictures; BBC Film
- Distributed by: Central City Media
- Release date: 8 March 2024 (Glasgow Film Festival)
- Running time: 91 minutes
- Country: United Kingdom
- Language: English
- Budget: £2 million

Edge of Summer is a 2024 British coming-of-age drama thriller film directed and written by Lucy Cohen, in her feature directorial debut. The film follows 11-year-old Evie who arrives in Cornwall in August 1991 for a holiday with her mother, but she is unprepared for what awaits.

The film premiered at the Glasgow Film Festival on 8 March 2024.

== Cast ==
- Flora Hylton as Evie, a 11-year-old girl
- Joel Sefton-Iongi as Adam, a local boy
- Josie Walker as Yvonne
- Nichola Burley as Debbie
- Steffan Rhodri as Tony

== Production ==
Development of Edge of Summer began on 2018, with a meeting with BBC Film’s then-commissioning executive, now director, Eva Yates. Filming took place in Pendeen and Falmouth in Cornwall for five weeks in August 2022.

== Release ==
Edge of Summer first premiered at the Glasgow Film Festival on 8 March 2024. It had its European premiere at Munich Film Festival on 29 June 2024 , followed by Dinard British Film Festival, Film LUCAS Film Festival, Film Fest Gent , Seminci International Film Festival , Cameraimage and other festivals across Europe.

== Reception ==
On the review aggregator website Rotten Tomatoes, 80% of 5 critics' reviews are positive, with an average rating of 7.7/10.
