= Fur TV =

- Genre: Adult puppeteering Black comedy Adult humor Comedy
- Created by: Chris Waitt; Henry Trotter
- Written by: Jason Hazeley; Joel Morris; Chris Waitt; Henry Trotter
- Starring: Mak Wilson; Don Austen; John Eccleston
- Voices of: Henry Trotter; Phil Nichol; Simon Greenall
- Theme music composer: Chris Waitt
- Country of origin: United Kingdom
- No. of seasons: 1
- No. of episodes: 8 (and 2 pilots)

Production
- Running time: 22 minutes
- Production companies: Yummo; Warp Films; MTV Networks Europe

Original release
- Network: MTV One
- Release: 4 May – 22 June 2008

Fur TV is a British comedy adult puppet show aired in 2008 on MTV One. The show uses Muppet-style puppetry where the characters are shown to undertake activities such as drinking and having sex.

== Production ==
Originally a short film created by Chris Waitt and Henry Trotter which won BBC's Greenlight Award for Comedy in 2002, and the Rose d'Or for Best Pilot at the Montreaux TV Festival in 2004. Television broadcast was scheduled to 2003, the pilot finally aired on 28 February 2004 on BBC Two. Another pilot called Furry Avenue was made in 2004.

MTV picked it up as a TV series and the show premiered in 2008. The show was produced by Waitt and Trotter's company Yummo, Warp Films and MTV Networks Europe.

In 2009 MTV released a series of shorts, each about 3 minutes in length.

== Plot ==
The main characters are 3 frog-like puppets named Fat Ed Tubbs, Lapeño Enriquez and Mervin J Minky. Fat Ed is a foul-mouthed, violent, beer swilling heavy metal fanatic, Lapeño is a Brazilian sex god who is irresistible to women (and even to some men), while Mervin is a perpetually cross-eyed, mentally challenged and self-abusing pervert with a chronic addiction to masturbation.

== Episodes ==
Episode Title Original air date

1. "Rent Boys/Hot Pussy" 4 May 2008
2. "My Big Fat Gay Wedding/There's Something About Mervin" 11 May 2008
3. "Mervin's Millions/Fur & Loathing" 18 May 2008
4. "Bad Apples/Enter the DJ" 25 May 2008
5. "Hungry for Love/Brown Fury" 1 June 2008
6. "Ladies Love Lapeño/Arse of Darkness" 8 June 2008
7. "Fist of Fur/Get Mervin" 15 June 2008
8. "Merverella" 22 June 2008

=== Shorts ===
Episode Title Original air date

1. "How To Cook Shit With Mervin" 31 May 2009
2. "Furry Movie Club" 7 June 2009
3. "It's Your Fan Mail" 14 June 2009
4. "Fat Ed's Furry Fucking Guide To Metal" 21 June 2009
5. "The Furry Guide To Love" 28 June 2009
6. "Stinkhole: Raining Brown" 5 July 2009
7. "Fat Ed's Super-Fix-It" 12 July 2009

== Soundtrack ==
- The song when Fat Ed beats up Mervin is Nightmare by Man Scouts of America.
- Raining Brown is a parody of Raining Blood but instrumentally is Master Of Puppets.
- Not Falling by Mudvayne is used in various scenes related to Fat Ed.

== International broadcasts ==
It has broadcast on all MTV channels in Europe, MTV2 in Canada and MTV in Brazil, Colombia, Australia, New Zealand. In France it is known as Télé Poils, on MTV Latin America it is broadcast as TV de Ciertopelo, in Ukraine as Волохате ТБ (Volohate TB), in Russia as Мохнатики (Mohnatiki) and on MTV Taiwan it is called 偶們最風流 (Puppets Are Charming).
