= Kristy (film) =

- Official poster
- Directed by: Oliver Blackburn
- Written by: Anthony Jaswinski
- Produced by: David Kirschner; Corey Sienega; Jamie Patricof; Lynette Howell
- Starring: Haley Bennett; Chris Coy; Mike Seal; Lucius Falick; Ashley Greene
- Cinematography: Crille Forsberg
- Edited by: Jeff Betancourt
- Music by: François Eudes
- Production companies: David Kirschner Productions; La Sienega Productions; Electric City Entertainment
- Distributed by: The Weinstein Company
- Release dates: October 14, 2014 (London Film Festival); October 17, 2015 (United States)
- Running time: 86 minutes
- Country: United States
- Language: English
- Budget: $6.9 million
- Box office: $260,371

Kristy is a 2014 American horror thriller film directed by Oliver Blackburn and starring Haley Bennett, Chris Coy, Mike Seal, Lucius Falick and Ashley Greene. The plot follows a college student who stays on campus alone over Thanksgiving break and finds herself terrorized by a cult of ritual killers. The film premiered on October 14, 2014, at the London Film Festival and also had theatrical releases internationally. In the United States, the film debuted on Lifetime on October 17, 2015.

== Plot ==
A hooded figure photographs a young woman's corpse in an empty field, followed by a montage of Internet screenshots and videos of women being killed in ritual murders by a cybercult. Footage of the murders is uploaded on an anonymous underground website where members are encouraged to "kill Kristy", a name of Latin origin meaning "follower of God".

College student Justine is attending a private university in the Northeastern United States on financial aid, and is unable to afford to fly home for Thanksgiving. Her boyfriend Aaron and roommate Nicole both leave for the break, leaving Justine to spend the holiday in solitude on a nearly empty campus, aside from security guard Wayne, front gate worker Dave, and groundskeeper Scott.

On Thanksgiving night, Justine uses Nicole's BMW to drive to a nearby convenience store. Inside the store, a hooded girl, Violet, compliments the car and later asks for a student discount on sunglasses at the counter. Justine offers to pay for them, but the girl angrily refuses and calls her "Kristy". That night, Justine finds that someone has accessed her laptop, as a snuff film plays on the screen. Violet appears in the room with a boxcutter, and Justine flees. Outside, Wayne is murdered in front of her by a masked man and she finds Dave killed in his vehicle.

The four cult killers assemble, and Violet begins recording Justine, telling her that they will hunt her and that she should "run to God". Justine flees to Scott's house for help. However, the killers murder his dog and hang him from a swing set in the yard. Justine attempts to call 9-1-1 from Scott's cell, but the gang has hacked it. They begin sending her video clips of herself and menacing text messages. Justine attempts to hide but is chased to the roof and cornered. She leaps from the roof but falling through the branches of a tree help break her fall.

Aaron arrives and is also killed. Justine uses Aaron's car to pin one of the cult members against a wall and crush him to death. She hides in the gym's swimming pool, stabbing a second member with her car keys and drowning him. Soon after, she beats a third to death with a baseball bat. She reads a text on the dead member's phone; it is from Violet asking if he has "killed Kristy yet". Justine responds "yes" and finds photos of the cult's other victims, with their declaration to kill the "Kristys" of the world: pure, beautiful, and privileged women who they believe follow God.

Justine uses pool chemicals to create a flammable powder. She dresses herself in the dead man's mask and jacket, and approaches the car where Violet is. Justine informs Violet that the others are dead, and when Violet comes toward her, Justine douses her with the flammable powder, burning Violet alive. Justine photographs Violet's corpse with the cellphone and uploads it to the website. A montage at the end reveals that a series of similar cult murders have occurred in other states and cities but with Justine's testimony and access to the phone, many of the cult's members have been arrested.

A post-credits scene shows a young woman being attacked by another cult killer outside her home, but the attacker is stopped by another masked individual.

== Cast ==
- Haley Bennett as Justine
- Ashley Greene as Violet
- Lucas Till as Aaron
- Chris Coy as Blue Hoodie
- Mike Seal as Black Hoodie
- Lucius Falick as Grey Hoodie
- Erica Ash as Nicole
- James Ransone as Scott
- Matthew St. Patrick as Wayne
- Al Vicente as Dave

== Production ==
=== Development ===
In April 2009, the spec script, written by Tony Jaswinski, was purchased by Dimension Films, In February 2012, it was announced that Gary Fleder would direct the film, with Scott Rosenberg contributing rewrites to Jaswinski's Screenplay, hoping to get Emma Watson in the lead role, while, David Kirschner will produce through his David Kirschner Productions. In June 2012, it was revealed that Olly Blackburn had taken over as director Corey Sienga and Matthew Stein joined as producers and executive producers respectively. In October 2012, Haley Bennett joined the cast of the film. At the American Film Market the film was retitled Satanic. In November 2012, Ashley Greene and Lucas Till joined the cast of the film. In February 2013, it was re-titled to Random.

=== Filming ===
Principal photography took place in New Orleans. Many scenes were filmed at Tulane University and Tad Gormley Stadium.

== Release ==
In February 2013, Entertainment Weekly released the first image of Ashley Greene in the film. The film screened at the London Film Festival on October 14, 2014. In August 2014, it was revealed the film was being re-edited for a US theatrical release. A theatrical release in the United States never materialized, however, and the film premiered on the television network Lifetime on October 17, 2015. It was released on Netflix on November 5, 2015.

The film did receive theatrical releases in several countries, including Italy, Egypt, South Korea, and the Philippines.

=== Home media ===
The film was released in Germany on DVD and Blu-ray on August 7, 2014.

== Reception ==
=== Box office ===
Kristy grossed $260,371 at the international box office.

=== Critical response ===
The film received mixed reviews. The script, story, and direction were criticized, but Bennett was praised for her performance.

== See also ==
- List of horror films set in academic institutions
- List of films featuring home invasions
