= She, a Chinese =

- Film poster
- Directed by: Xiaolu Guo
- Written by: Xiaolu Guo
- Produced by: Natasha Dack Ojumu; Christian Kux; Sylvain Bursztejn
- Starring: Huang Lu
- Cinematography: Zillah Bowes
- Edited by: Andrew Bird
- Music by: John Parrish; Matt Scott; Hang on the Box
- Production companies: Warp X; Film4 Productions; UK Film Council; Tigerlily Films; Screen Yorkshire; EM Media; Intervista Digital Media; Rosem Films; Filmförderung Hamburg Schleswig-Holstein; Fonds Sud Cinéma
- Release date: 14 August 2009 (LFF)
- Running time: 103 minutes
- Countries: UK; France; China
- Languages: Chinese; English

She, a Chinese is a 2009 international co-production drama film written and directed by Xiaolu Guo. Inspired by Jean-Luc Godard's La Chinoise, it portraits a fragmented journey of a young Chinese woman through the world. It won the 2009 Golden Leopard at the Locarno Film Festival.

== Plot ==
In 12 chapters, Mei escapes from her village in Sichuan province to a big city. She moves from job to job, man to man, and reaches the UK. She wanders in the streets. The sea is calling her. She gazes at the other side of the water as if towards her younger self.

== Cast ==
- Huang Lu - Li Mei
- Wei Yi Bo - 'Spikey'
- Geoffrey Hutchings - Geoffrey Hunt
- Chris Ryman - Rachid
- Hsinyi Liu - London Tour Guide

== Filming ==
The film was shot in Chongqing, China, in London, and on the coast of Essex in eastern England.

== Release ==
It was released by StudioCanal UK (formerly Optimum Releasing) and the Channel 4. The film was premiered at the Locarno Film Festival as well as Toronto Film Festival 2009 with positive reviews.
