= Beyond Hatred =

- Cover of DVD release
- Directed by: Olivier Meyrou
- Written by: Olivier Meyrou
- Produced by: Christophe Girard; Katharina Marx
- Cinematography: Florian Bouchet; Jean-Marc Bouzou; Emma Fernández
- Edited by: Cathie Dambel; Jérome Pey
- Music by: François-Eudes Chanfrault
- Distributed by: Peccadillo Pictures (UK)
- Release date: June 19, 2005
- Running time: 86 minutes
- Country: France
- Language: French

Beyond Hatred (French: Au-delà de la haine) is a 2005 French documentary film written and directed by Olivier Meyrou.

The documentary tells the story of a French couple seeking justice and feeling acceptance after the homophobic murder of their gay son, 29-year-old Francois Chenu. He was murdered by three white power skinheads in 2002, who beat him severely in the face and threw him into a pond. The attackers were arrested one month after the incident, and Meyrou read about the case on the front page of Le Monde. He had been wanting to make a film about homophobia for some time, and decided that the Chenu case was very emblematic.

The film's French television premiere was on 19 June 2005; Eurozoom distributed the film's French theatrical release the following year. It was shown at the 2006 Berlin International Film Festival, the Paris Gay and Lesbian Film Festival, and the 2007 London Lesbian and Gay Film Festival. It had a limited theatrical release in the United States on 15 June 2007, distributed by First Run Features.

Rotten Tomatoes gave Beyond Hatred a "fresh" rating of 89% based on 18 reviews. Metacritic gave it a "generally favorable" rating of 65% based on five reviews. The documentary won the Teddy Award for Best Documentary at the 2006 Berlin Film Festival.
