= Popjournalism =

Popjournalism is a Canadian entertainment magazine, based out of Toronto, Canada, which was first published online in 2000 and branched out into print in 2004. The first print edition was published on November 25, 2004 and featured interviews with comedian Rick Mercer and singer Jann Arden. The quarterly magazine is distributed to newsstands across Canada and has a circulation of 5,000 copies.

The magazine's founder, publisher and editor is Robert Ballantyne.
