= A Complete History of My Sexual Failures =

- Directed by: Chris Waitt
- Produced by: Henry Trotter; Mary Burke
- Starring: Alexandra Boyarskaya; Danielle McLeod; Olivia Trench; Chris Waitt; Hilary Waitt; Mary Burke
- Cinematography: Steven Mochrie
- Edited by: Mark Atkins; Chris Dickens; Henry Trotter
- Music by: Chris Waitt; Beck; Grizzly Bear; Born Ruffians
- Production companies: Film4 Productions; UK Film Council; EM Media; Screen Yorkshire; Warp X
- Distributed by: Optimum Releasing
- Release dates: 19 January 2008 (Sundance Film Festival); 27 June 2008 (United Kingdom)
- Running time: 90 minutes
- Country: United Kingdom
- Language: English

A Complete History of My Sexual Failures is a 2008 British documentary film directed by Chris Waitt who also starred as the main character and composed some of the music. The film was part of the "World Cinema Documentary Competition" at the 2008 Sundance Film Festival.

== Synopsis ==
Filmmaker Chris Waitt sets out on a quest to find out why his romantic relationships have ended in complete failure. Tracking down almost all of his former lovers, he finds a general resentment, stemming from his constant unreliability. He then sets out to test different approaches that will prepare him for true love, and a lasting relationship.

== Reception ==
Reviews of the film were mixed, with Rotten Tomatoes giving the film 56%. Dennis Harvey, writing for Variety, was generally positive, and commended Waitt for his willingness "to appear a complete (though endearing) ass", while suspecting he was not quite as dumb as he appeared. The Independent, The Independent on Sunday, The Times, The Financial Times and The Sun all gave the movie four stars.

The Daily Telegraph's Mike McCahill, doubting the veracity of Waitt's story, concluded that "It's a display of gross bad faith both as documentarist and lover, and its subject probably deserves never to get laid again."

On the other hand, Toby Young writing in The Independent, despite thinking that "If Waitt was an employee of the BBC he'd be dragged before a series of committees before being tossed into the street" nonetheless concluded that "this doesn't matter at all" as the film was "so funny I thought I would pass out".

== Remake ==
In March 2009, Variety announced that Universal Pictures had bought the remake rights for the movie, and intend to produce a narrative feature remake to be directed by Jay Roach, and produced by Neal Moritz from a script by Jay Reiss. Chris Waitt and Henry Trotter (producer of the original documentary) will executive produce.
