= Julian Morris =

English actor (born 1983)

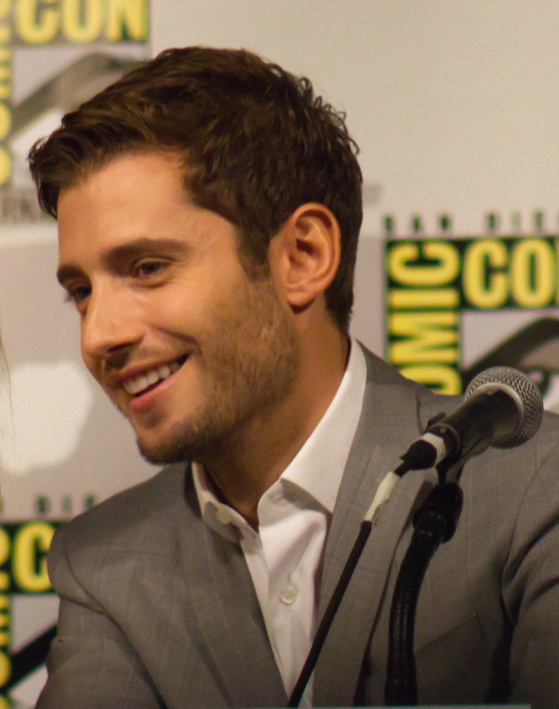
- Morris at the 2015 San Diego Comic-Con
- Born: Julian David Morris; 13 January 1983 (age 43); Crouch End, London, England
- Occupation: Actor
- Years active: 1996–present
- Known for: Pretty Little Liars; Hand Of God; New Girl
- Spouse: Landon Ross

Julian David Morris (born 13 January 1983) is an English actor. After appearing in the British television series The Knock (1996) and Fish (2000) during his teenage years, he had his first starring role in the American slasher film Cry Wolf (2005). He subsequently had supporting roles in the thriller Donkey Punch (2008), the historical drama Valkyrie (2008), and another slasher film Sorority Row (2009).

Morris has also appeared in American television as a series regular on Pretty Little Liars and Hand of God, and had recurring roles on Once Upon a Time and New Girl.

== Early life ==
Morris was born in Crouch End, North London, and grew up in Muswell Hill. He is the son of South African-born Glen and Zimbabwean-born Andrea Morris, and spent a lot of time in both countries growing up. He has a younger sister, Amy, and is from a Jewish family.

== Career ==
Morris began acting at the Anna Scher Theatre in London. It was there, when he was 13, that a director on the British drama series The Knock spotted him and asked him to play a boy pushed into the drug trade. Morris continued his intensive training under Anna Scher for the next eight years. In this period more opportunities arose, and after appearing in several television shows, films and commercials, he went on to spend three seasons with the Royal Shakespeare Company, working with directors such as Steven Pimlott, Tim Albery and Elijah Moshinsky, and alongside actors like Simon Russell Beale, Samuel West and Roger Allam.

Morris made his US debut in the 2005 slasher film Cry Wolf as lead character Owen Matthews, followed by the role of James Edwards in the 2006 drama film Whirlygirl.

Morris was next seen in the independent horror film Donkey Punch as Josh, critically honoured after its screening at the 2008 Sundance Film Festival. He also appeared in Valkyrie starring Tom Cruise and the Sugababes video "Freak Like Me". Morris next had a supporting role in the slasher film Sorority Row as Andy. In 2010, he played the recurring role of Agent Owen in 24.

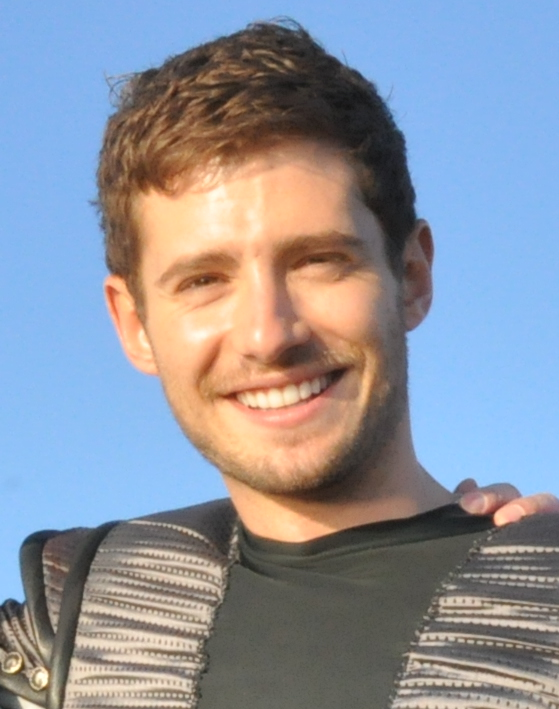
Morris on set of Once Upon A Time in March 2013

Morris was part of the main cast of the 2010 ABC documentary-style dramedy series My Generation, playing "The Rich Kid" Anders Holt. Morris also starred in the teen drama Pretty Little Liars as Dr. Wren Kingston. In July 2012, Morris joined the ABC series Once Upon a Time as Prince Phillip.

Morris starred as Victor in the film Kelly + Victor, which premiered on 16 October 2012 at the BFI London Film Festival, and was released theatrically in the UK on 20 September 2013. The film won the BAFTA Award for Outstanding Debut by a British Writer, Director or Producer in 2014. The following year, Morris portrayed the lead role of Gareth in the fantasy adventure film Dragonheart 3: The Sorcerer's Curse.

In March 2014, Morris was cast as Reverend Paul Curtis in the Amazon Studios pilot Hand of God. The pilot was ordered to full series by Amazon Studios in October 2014. In August 2014, he landed a recurring guest role on the Fox sitcom New Girl, playing Ryan Geauxinue.

In May 2016, Morris landed a major role in the film Mark Felt: The Man Who Brought Down the White House playing Bob Woodward, the Washington Post reporter who teamed with Carl Bernstein to expose the Watergate dealings.

In 2017 he played the part of Adam Berryman in the two-part TV drama Man in an Orange Shirt (part of BBC television's Gay Britannia season), opposite Vanessa Redgrave.

== Personal life ==
Morris lives in Los Angeles, California.

Morris's grandfather was captured by the Nazis during World War II and was sent to a prison camp in Italy for two months. In a 2009 interview, Morris said of his experience filming Valkyrie, "There was a scene where all these explosions were happening and I remember thinking, gosh this is exactly the same region that my grandpa would have experienced. I was exactly there where my grandpa had been in the early 1940's. It was spectacular."

Morris is gay. On 2 December 2021, Morris announced on Instagram that he was celebrating his 18th anniversary with his partner, artist Landon Ross. Shortly after, it was reported that the two had married recently.

== Filmography ==
=== Film ===
Year	Title	Role	Notes	Ref
1999	Don't Go Breaking My Heart	Charlie		
2002	Spin	Fiz	Short film	
2005	Cry Wolf	Owen Matthews		
2006	Whirlygirl	James		
2008	Donkey Punch	Josh		
2008	Valkyrie	Young Lieutenant – Desert		
2009	Sorority Row	Andy		
2010	Privileged	Spencer Stephens		
2012	Beyond	Farley		
2012	Kelly + Victor	Victor		
2014	Something Wicked	Ryan		
2014	Take Flight	Walt	Short film	
2015	Dragonheart 3: The Sorcerer's Curse	Gareth		
2017	Mark Felt: The Man Who Brought Down the White House	Bob Woodward		
2018	Viper Club	Andy		

=== Television ===
Year	Title	Role	Notes
1996	The Knock	Dafyd Ellis	1 episode
1999	Kid in the Corner	School boy	unknown episodes
2000	Fish	Carl Lumsden	Main role
2004	Agatha Christie's Marple	Dennis Clement	Episode: "The Murder at the Vicarage"
2007	Shark	Dylan Crawford	Episode: "Teacher's Pet"
2008–2009	ER	Dr. Andrew Wade	Recurring role, 7 episodes
2009	Privileged	Simon	Episode: "All About a Brand New You"
2009	Eleventh Hour	Quinn	Episode: "Subway"
2010	24	Agent Owen	Recurring role, 6 episodes
2010–2013; 2017	Pretty Little Liars	Wren Kingston	Recurring role, 20 episodes
2010	My Generation	Anders Holt	Main role
2012	Men at Work	Damien	Episode: Pilot
2012–2014	Once Upon a Time	Prince Phillip	Recurring role, 6 episodes
2014–2017	Hand of God	Reverend Paul Curtis	Main role
2014–2015	New Girl	Ryan Geauxinue	Recurring role, 7 episodes
2017	Man in an Orange Shirt	Adam Berryman	Miniseries
2017	Little Women	John Brooke	Miniseries
2019	The Morning Show	Andrew	1 episode
2020	The Good Fight	Major Brigham	1 episode
2021	A Royal Queens Christmas	Colin	Hallmark TV Movie
2022	The Presence of Love	Daniel	Hallmark TV Movie

=== Music videos ===
Year	Title	Artist(s)	Ref.
2002	"Freak like Me"	Sugababes	
2014	"Imagine" (UNICEF: World version)	Various	
