= Chris Waitt =

British filmmaker and musician

- Born: Christopher Martyn Preston; 8 February 1971 (age 55); Worthing, England
- Occupations: Filmmaker; musician; writer

Christopher Martyn Preston Waitt (born 8 February 1971) is an English independent filmmaker, musician and writer from the seaside town of Worthing, England.

== Films and television ==
After an unsuccessful career as a rock musician, Waitt began to write and direct short films. He co-wrote, directed and performed in the Bafta winning short film Dupe, a comedy about a slacker who buys a cloning machine on eBay.

He also made a number of short documentaries, including the Bafta-nominated Heavy Metal Jr., a humorous look at a group of ten-year-olds who form a death metal band called Hatred. The film was included on the Wholphin DVD collection.

Waitt also directed, co-wrote and co-created the MTV adult puppet show Fur TV, with his long-term collaborator, writer and producer Henry Trotter.

In 2008, Waitt completed his first feature film, the confessional and humorous documentary A Complete History of My Sexual Failures. The film was made through Warp films and Film4 and had its world premiere at the Sundance film festival in 2008, where it was also nominated for the Grand Jury Prize. In 2009, the rights for A Complete History of My Sexual Failures were purchased by Universal Studios. The Hollywood remake will be directed by Jay Roach (Meet the Fockers, Austin Powers). Waitt is an Executive Producer on the film.

Waitt has attempted to develop his second film with Film4 and Baby Cow Productions, provisionally entitled Untitled Chris Waitt Vanity Project no. 2.

McLaren's cult-following animated series Tooned, written and directed by Waitt under Framestore, debuted in time for the 2012 British Grand Prix on 8 July.

In 2022, Waitt directed content for the experience "Avengers: Quantum Encounter", a dinner-show produced for the Disney Wish.

== Music ==
Waitt is the singer and guitarist in the experimental indie electro art metal band Warm Puppies. The band have produced much of the music for Waitt's films. As a solo artist or with the Puppies, Chris has performed at a number of English music festivals, notably Reading, Latitude and Gold. Waitt also dee-jays under the name Bad DJ.
