= Julie Dreyfus =

French actress

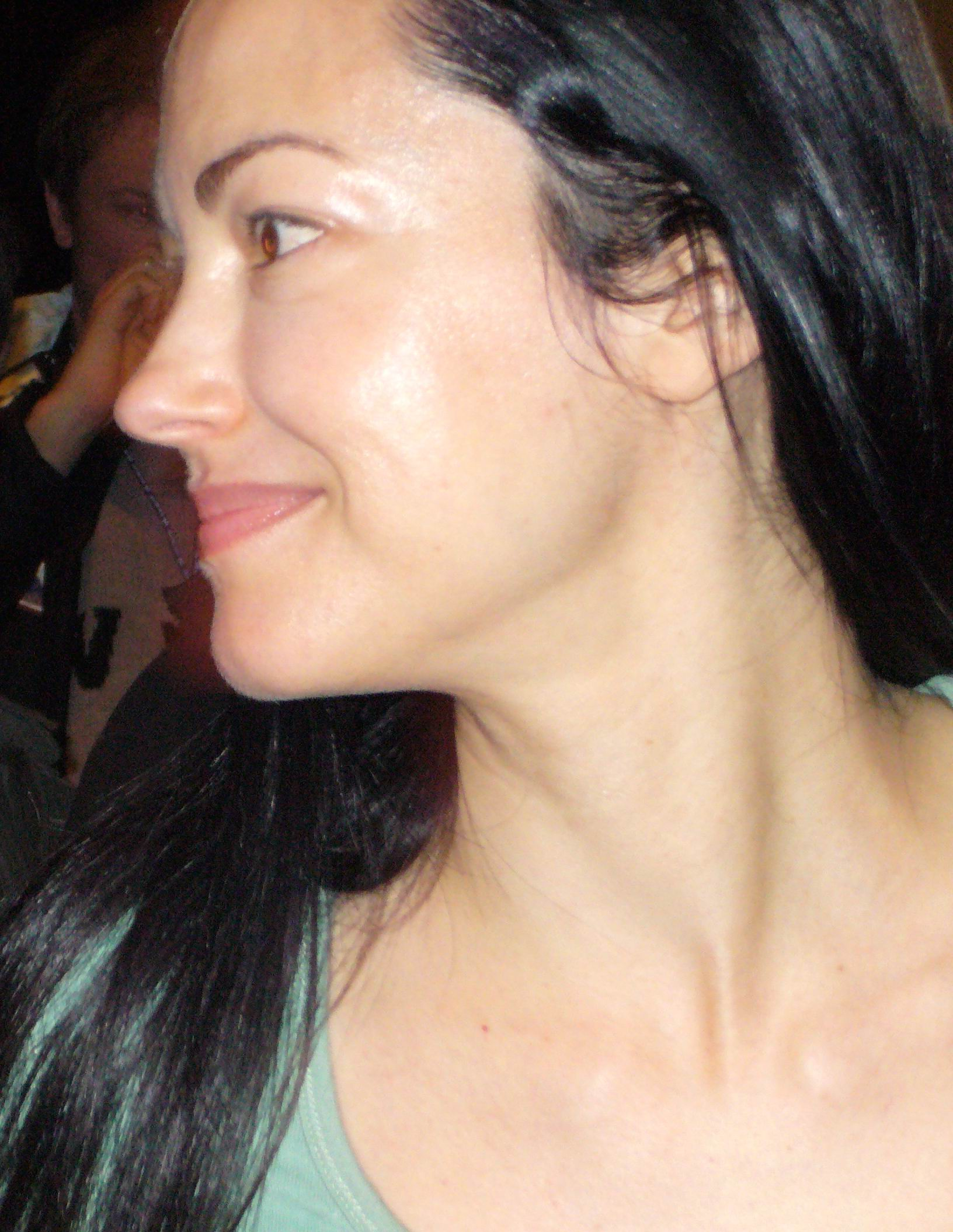
- Dreyfus in 2007
- Born: 24 January 1966 (age 60); Paris, France
- Occupation: Actress

Julie Dreyfus (born 24 January 1966) is a French actress. In Japan, she made her television debut on a French-language lesson program on NHK's educational channel in the late 1980s. She has appeared on the TV show Ryōri no Tetsujin (Iron Chef) as a guest and judge. She appeared in the Quentin Tarantino films Kill Bill: Volume 1 and Inglourious Basterds, portraying Sofie Fatale and Francesca Mondino respectively. Aside from her native French, she is fluent in English, German, and Japanese.

== Early life ==
Dreyfus was born and raised in Paris, the only child of actress Pascale Audret and producer Francis Dreyfus. Her father was of Romanian Jewish and Alsatian Jewish ancestry, and her mother was of French descent. She spent her summers in the UK. As a child she used to watch Woody Allen's early movies together with her mother.

Dreyfus started learning Japanese in 1985 at the Institute for Oriental Languages and Civilisation at the University of Paris, after studying interior design and becoming interested in Japanese architecture. She moved to Japan to study at the Osaka University of Foreign Studies for a six-month, intensive Japanese course, thinking that she would eventually land a job in interior design. After finishing the course, she moved to Tokyo working part-time in a design studio while continuing her private Japanese lessons.

In 1988, she worked as a French language instructor on the NHK morning-television-educational program. Centering on a mystery drama, chief producer Motoyoshi Sei hired Dreyfus to increase ratings by changing the program into an episode format. Eventually, she was cast by Japanese network executives as the twenty-something beauty in several TV and film roles, leading her to become a gaijin tarento (foreign talent). She was also a judge on the cult-hit cooking show Ryōri no Tetsujin (Iron Chef).

== Career ==
Dreyfus portrayed the character of Sofie Fatale in Quentin Tarantino's 2003 film, Kill Bill Volume 1. She was a member of the 2007 Gérardmer Film Festival (Festival international du film fantastique de Gérardmer), which honored her Kill Bill co-star David Carradine.

Dreyfus appeared in the 2008 French drama horror film Vinyan and in Tarantino's war epic Inglourious Basterds in 2009, as Francesca Mondino, a fictional French interpreter and mistress for Nazi propagandist Joseph Goebbels. She also appeared as a translator in the Leos Carax segment entitled "Merde" in the feature film Tokyo!

== Filmography ==
Year	Film/television	Role	Notes
1986	Sekai fushigi hakken	Herself	unknown episodes
1992	Tōki Rakujitsu	Mary	
1994	Rampo	Mademoiselle	
1996	Ryôri no tetsujin	Herself/Taster/Panel Guest	2 episodes
1996	A Feast at Midnight	Mother	
1998	Legal Aliens	Isabel	
1998	The Crow: Stairway to Heaven	India Reyes	3 episodes
1999	The Godson	Laura	
2000	Bathory	Lady Katarina	
2002	Jean Moulin	Lydie Bastien	
2003	Kill Bill: Volume 1	Sofie Fatale	also casting associate
2004	Kill Bill: Volume 2	Sofie Fatale	
2004	Kill Bill: The Whole Bloody Affair	Sofie Fatale	
2008	Tokyo!	The interpreter	
2008	Vinyan	Kim	
2009	Inglourious Basterds	Francesca Mondino	Screen Actors Guild Award for Outstanding Performance by a Cast in a Motion Picture
2011	Interpol	Barbara	
2013	Bitter Sweet Home Kyoto		Season 1 Episode 11: Episode #1.11
