= Nichola Burley =

English actress

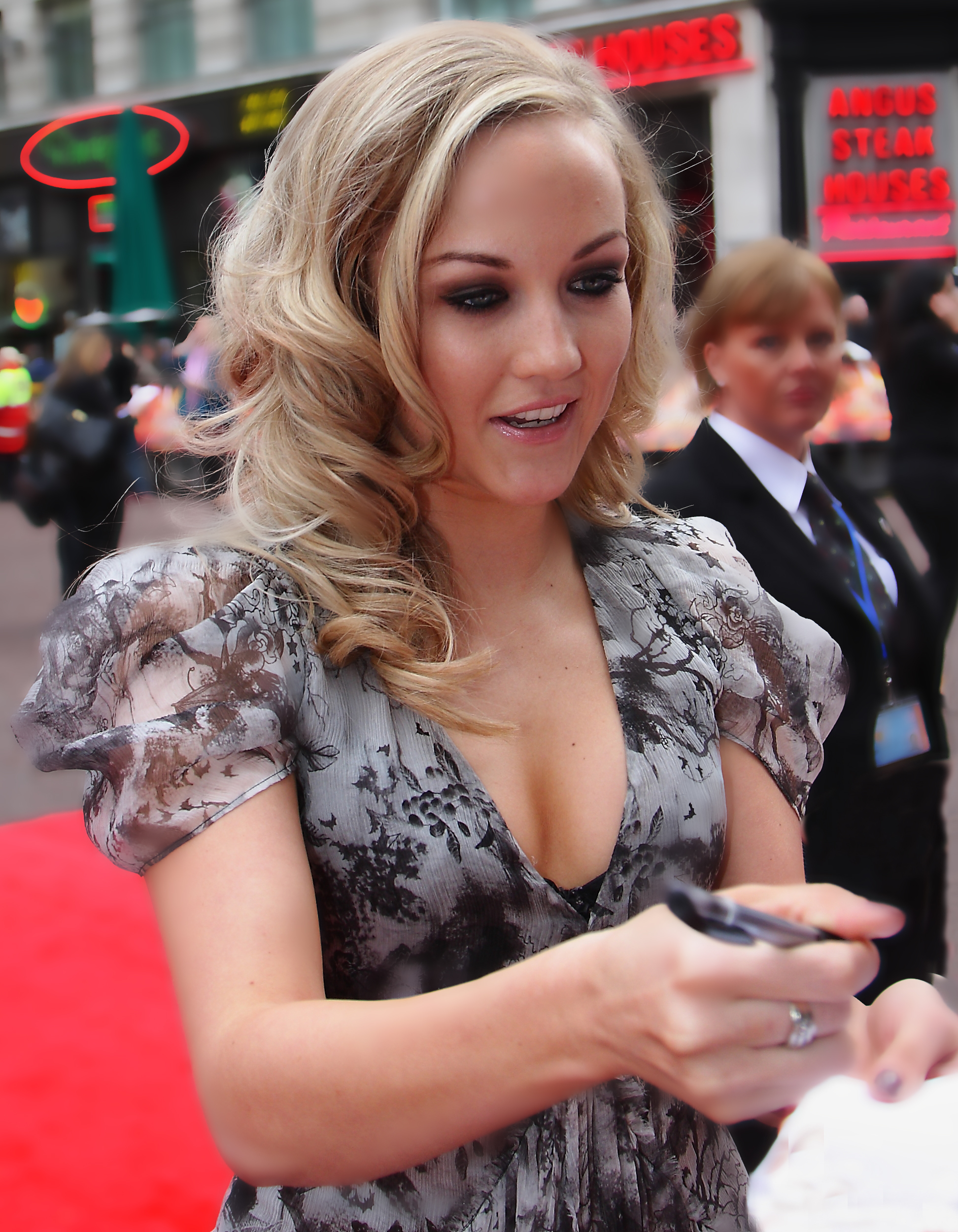
- Burley at the premiere of StreetDance 3D in 2010
- Born: Nichola Burley; Leeds, England
- Occupation: Actress
- Years active: 2005–present

Nichola Burley is an English actress. She has appeared in Born Equal, Drop Dead Gorgeous, Goldplated, Death Comes to Pemberley, Donkey Punch and StreetDance 3D.

== Early life and education ==
Nichola Burley was born in Leeds, England. She attended Intake High School, Bramley, where she studied performing arts.

== Career ==
Burley's acting career began in 2005 when she appeared as Michelle in the Dominic Savage film Love + Hate. She has had guest roles in The Ghost Squad, in November 2005, and Shameless in February 2006. In September 2006, Channel 4 show Goldplated debuted with Burley appearing in the ensemble cast. Due to low ratings, a second season was never commissioned.

In November 2006, she played Zoe, in Savage's improvised, one-off BBC drama Born Equal. The BBC described the show as one which "addresses social inequality in Britain today". Directed and written by Savage again, the film also starred Robert Carlyle, Anne-Marie Duff and Colin Firth. As part of her research for the show she travelled to meet young runaways in London.

She has also starred as Cathy McAleer in BBC Three show Drop Dead Gorgeous throughout its first series in 2006 and its second in 2007.

In 2010, she appeared in the dance film StreetDance 3D in the lead role alongside George Sampson, Diversity and Flawless. She portrays Isabella Linton in a 2011 film adaptation of Wuthering Heights. She appeared as Witney Whitehead in the BBC drama Candy Cabs which began on 5 April 2011. She also starred in one episode of crime drama Lewis on ITV1.

Her stage credits include the title role in Bollywood Jane at the West Yorkshire Playhouse throughout June 2007, and Constanza in a Sheffield revival of Peter Schaffer's Amadeus.

She plays Sophie Brodenham in the 2025 BBC One crime series Virdee.

== Recognition ==
Burley's name is one of those featured on the sculpture Ribbons, unveiled in 2024.

== Midlands Drama Academy ==
Burley teaches at her own Acting Academy, Midlands Drama Academy.

== Filmography ==
=== Film ===
| Year | Title | Role | Notes |
|---|---|---|---|
| 2005 | Love + Hate | Michelle | |
| 2008 | Donkey Punch | Tammi | |
| 2009 | Kicks | Jasmine | |
| 2010 | StreetDance 3D | Carly | |
| 2010 | SoulBoy | Jane Rogers | |
| 2010 | Edge | Sophie | |
| 2011 | Wuthering Heights | Isabella Linton | |
| 2011 | R | Val | Short films |
| 2011 | Guarding Angel | Angel | Short films |
| 2011 | Supermarket Girl | Michelle | Short films |
| 2012 | Payback Season | Lisa Lovell | |
| 2012 | Jump | Greta Feeney | |
| 2012 | Twenty8k | Andrea Patterson | |
| 2013 | For Those in Peril | Jane | |
| 2014 | Catch Me Daddy | Vicky | |
| 2016 | The Rack Pack | Lynn Higgins | |
| 2018 | Bite | Valerie | Short film |
| 2019 | Lynn + Lucy | Lucy | |
| 2024 | Edge of Summer | Debbie | |

=== Television ===
| Year | Title | Role | Notes |
|---|---|---|---|
| 2005 | The Ghost Squad | Natalie | Episode 3: "Heroes" |
| 2006 | Shameless | Chloe | Series 3; episode 6: "In with the Maguires" |
| 2006 | Goldplated | Donna | Episodes 1–8 |
| 2006 | Born Equal | Zoe | Television film |
| 2006–2007 | Drop Dead Gorgeous | Cathy McAleer | Series 1 & 2; episodes 1–4 |
| 2008 | Spooks: Code 9 | Lizzie | Episode 3 |
| 2009 | Inspector George Gently | Fawn Granger | Series 2; episode 2: "Gently in the Night" |
| 2009 | The Fixer | Savanna Ford | Series 2; episodes 1 & 2 |
| 2011 | Lewis | Karen Wilde | Series 5; episode 3: "The Mind Has Mountains" |
| 2011 | Candy Cabs | Whitney Whiteburn | Episodes 1–3 |
| 2011 | Scott & Bailey | Hannah Conway | Series 1; episode 3: "Personal" |
| 2013 | The Syndicate | Bethany | Series 2; episodes 3–5 |
| 2013 | Southcliffe | Sarah Gould | Mini-series; episodes 2 & 3: "Light Falls" & "Sorrow's Child" |
| 2013 | Death Comes to Pemberley | Louisa Bidwell | Mini-series; episodes 1–3 |
| 2015 | No Offence | Elizabeth | Series 1; episode 5 |
| 2015 | Downton Abbey | Rita Bevan | Series 6; episode 1 |
| 2019 | Wild Bill | Charlene | Mini-series; episode 5: "You're Stupid Enough to Say That to a Copper?" |
| 2021 | Behind Her Eyes | Sophie | Mini-series; episodes 1, 3 & 5 |
| 2023 | The Gold | Brenda Noye | Series 1; episodes 1–4 & 6 |
| 2024 | Protection | Gemma Brandice | Mini-series; episodes 1–3, 5 & 6 |
| 2025 | Virdee | Sophie Brodenham | Episodes 3–6 |
