= Regional screen agencies =

Following a review of the film infrastructure in England during 2000, the UK Film Council set up nine Regional Screen Agencies, one in each of the regions of England, to deliver support for film-making, exhibition and related media activities. The regional screen agency network was closed down in 2011, with a number of services consolidated into a new agency, Creative England, and the majority of screen agencies then folded. However, a few continued to operate, most notably Film London and Screen Yorkshire.

The nine agencies were or are:

- Screen East (East of England)
- (East Midlands)
- Film London (Greater London)
- Northern Film and Media, relaunched in 2022 as North East Screen (North East England)
- Vision+Media (North West England)
- Screen South (South East England)
- South West Screen (South West England)
- Screen West Midlands (West Midlands)
- Screen Yorkshire (Yorkshire and the Humber)

== Role and activities ==
Regional Screen Agencies have cultural, economic and social objectives. They engage with other regional partners and to involve stakeholders including local film and television producers, broadcasters, games developers, museums and other cultural organisations.

Each agency has interpreted the brief from the UK Film Council in its own way. Typically, this focusses on the provision of operational activities such training schemes, administration of funding for activities such as film festivals and film education, and the operation of investment funds and local services designed to make a region an attractive place for film-makers to bring inward investment.
