= Sue Bruce-Smith =

British film producer (died 2020)

- Born: Susan Bruce-Smith; 1957 or 1958; Birmingham, England
- Died: 2 May 2020 (aged 62); Dublin, Ireland
- Education: King Edward VI Camp Hill School; University of Kent; Goldsmiths, University of London
- Occupation: Film producer

Susan Claire Bruce-Smith (1957/58 – 2 May 2020) was a British film producer. Variety described her as an "industry titan". She spent most of her career with Film4, and was serving as its deputy director at the time of her death. She specialised in financial and marketing strategy for distribution.

An influential producer, she is described by the industry as being encouraging but not imposing, and a key figure in the success of many British and independent films. She financed and/or produced multiple films for directors including Lenny Abrahamson, Danny Boyle, Sarah Gavron, Derek Jarman, Asif Kapadia, Yorgos Lanthimos, Mike Leigh, Steve McQueen, and Ben Wheatley. Among her over 100 films are several Academy Award winners, including 12 Years a Slave, The Favourite, Room, Slumdog Millionaire and Three Billboards Outside Ebbing, Missouri.

== Early life ==
Bruce-Smith was born in Birmingham to Maureen (née Sinclair) and James Bruce-Smith. Her mother was a teacher and her father was a GP. She attended King Edward VI Camp Hill School for Girls, and then studied French at the University of Kent. In the late 1970s, she spent some time studying in Paris with future colleague Amanda Nevill. After graduating from Kent, she became a secondary school teacher. She also studied at Goldsmiths, University of London.

== Career ==
=== 1985–2004: Career beginnings and progression ===
In 1985, Bruce-Smith took a temporary job at Palace Pictures, which had begun producing films the year before, after taking a career break from teaching. She said that she was informally interviewed by Palace's founder Stephen Woolley and producer Paul Webster, explaining that they did not care about qualifications and she only revealed her education after being employed. She later spoke about misogyny in the company from its co-founder Nik Powell, saying that when she voiced opinions Powell would "react like [she] was a stupid woman hassling him over a fire drill. It was like swatting a fly for him", and that he would always come back to her later and admit she was right. Still, she said that she "was incredibly lucky to land at Palace [because] everyone was hugely inventive and questioning of the orthodoxy, which made it a dynamic and pretty anarchic environment, filled with highly creative people". She initially worked there, her introduction to the film industry, as a print and bookings manager, before moving up to marketing and distribution. In this role she worked on films including A Nightmare on Elm Street and Hairspray; she personally promoted A Nightmare on Elm Street by dressing up as Freddy Krueger on stage at the London Hippodrome. Bruce-Smith developed a passion for independent film at Palace.

In 1989, she joined the BFI's production department as its head of sales, staying until 1993 when she moved to the BBC and managed films' international distributions. Eventually, she joined Film4 for the first time in 1997. Working at Film4 in the late 1990s, Bruce-Smith put up funding for one of Werner Herzog's films, and was said to be amiable to his unusual requests. She left Film4 briefly in 2001 to pursue work with the independent production company Little Bird in Dublin, Ireland, but returned in 2004. She remained a board member of the Dublin International Film Festival until 2015.

=== 2004–2020: Return to Film4 and acclaim ===
Film4 director Tessa Ross personally called Bruce-Smith to entice her back to the "recalibrated" Film4, and she became head of commercial development and distribution. She was said to be swayed back to Film4 because it would involve work in public service filmmaking, "which she was instinctively drawn to with its sense of remit and social purpose". In 2008, she was one of the co-founders of film sales company Protagonist Pictures as part of a Film4-Ingenious Media-Vertigo Films venture, marking Film4's move back into international distribution, something that Ross' rebrand had ended in 2002. Rose Garnett wrote in her obituary for The Guardian that Bruce-Smith spent "much of her long and influential tenure [at Film4 working] with Tessa Ross". Interviewed in 2014, Ross said that Bruce-Smith "comes to editorial meetings, she reads scripts early on, we talk about ideas, we often talk about directors and producers, and matching people up. She's very involved the minute we decide to move things into production – in conversations about scale and value, and how things should be built, she's unbelievably involved". Ross left Film4 in 2014.

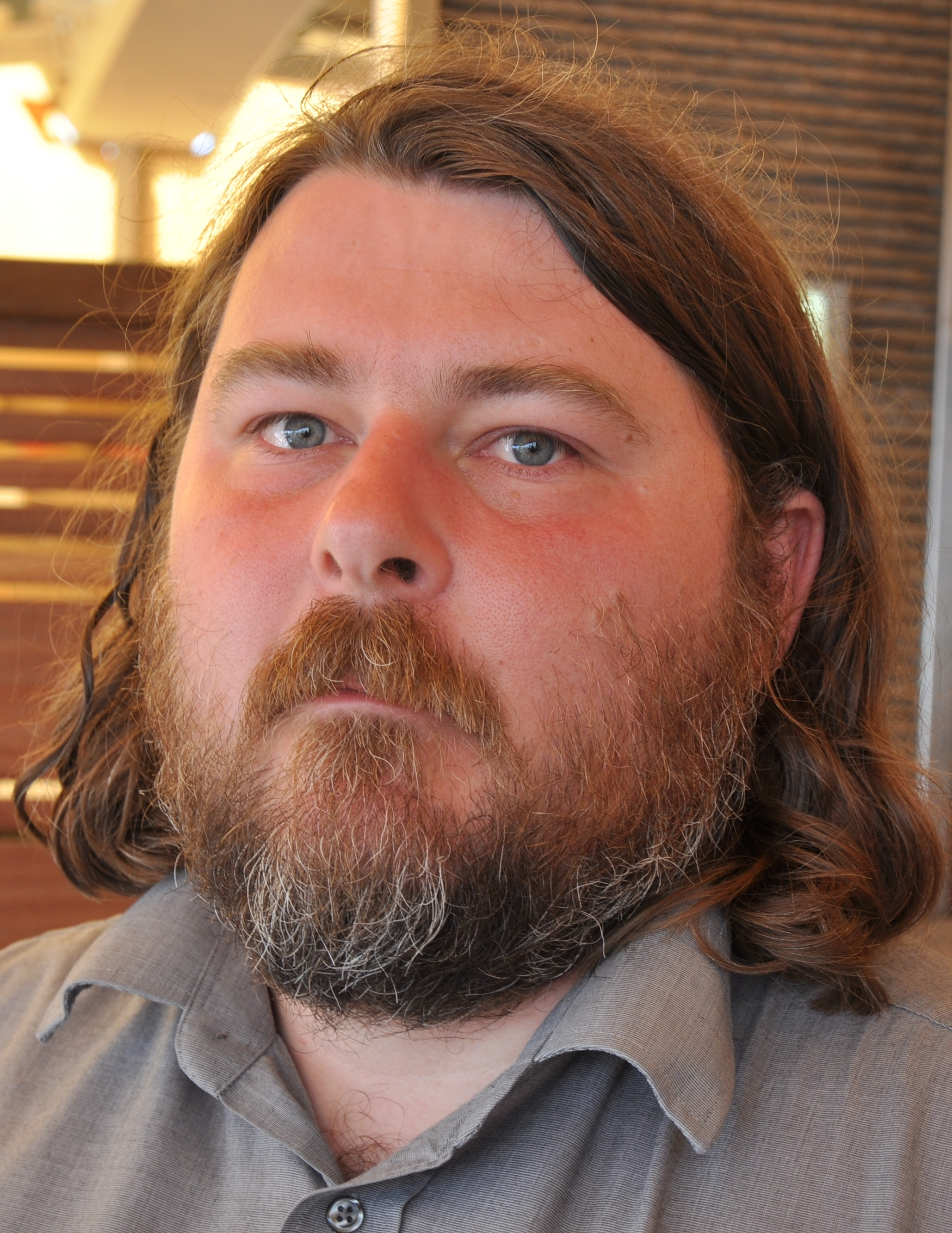
Ben Wheatley, with whom Bruce-Smith worked on four films. She described him as "undoubtedly one of our boldest, brightest and most audience savvy filmmakers".

In 2013, Bruce-Smith distributed Ben Wheatley's film A Field in England. It was reported as the first time that a film utilised complete simultaneous release, being released in cinemas, on home media, video on demand, and free to TV at the same time. Though the first film with all these releases happening on the same day, similar strategies with platform releases only days or weeks apart had been done before. Discussed in media scholar Virginia Crisp's book, Bruce-Smith suggested that changes in audience were driving the innovations in distribution. She said that Film4 had "wanted to do something like this for quite some time, to give the audience what they say they want: to be able to watch a new film when and where they want to"; she still described the practice as experimental and disruptive, supporting theatrical releases. Wheatley also gave his voice to the importance of the cinema, and to the importance of having financial backing from a channel if choosing to go down the simultaneous release route.

In the 2015/16 award season, Film4 (under director David Kosse) had 581 nominations from eleven films, most of which Bruce-Smith was involved with, including fifteen Academy Award and 22 BAFTA nominees; within these were three of the five Academy Best Actress nominees and eventual winner (Brie Larson for Lenny Abrahamson's Room). Bruce-Smith called the Oscar wins inspirational. Off the back of this success, Film4 was given a larger budget for 2016 from parent company Channel 4, allowing Bruce-Smith to set bolder aims in strategy. She signed the creators of The Inbetweeners for a four-film deal, and began working on more co-productions. Bruce-Smith was promoted to deputy director in 2017 by new director Daniel Battsek.

== Production style and outreach ==
A mark of Bruce-Smith's work was creating strong relationships with up-and-coming directors, many of whom are "now considered to be among the very best", including Steve McQueen, Wheatley, Yorgos Lanthimos, and Sarah Gavron. Another is Abrahamson, who, when interviewed in anticipation of the 2015/16 award season in relation to Room, said that he goes to Film4 first with new projects: "they are supportive of the directors they work with, and there is no other agenda other than to help you make the film you want to make [...] the early stages of a project are when it is at its most delicate [...] it is so important that anybody you let into that part of the process is carefully chosen". Bruce-Smith concurred, saying that she liked to get involved from the start of a project, and always put the filmmaker first. Specialising in financial and marketing strategy for distribution, she would also guide production and leave her mark, but was committed to protecting a filmmaker's vision.

Bruce-Smith hosted the British industry's emerging female talent dinner in 2017, and is said to have gone out of her way to encourage both new and female talent in all aspects of the industry. In 2016, she spoke with Womanthology on diversity in the industry, saying that while female roles were on the rise there was still a lack of women writers, directors, and directors of photography. She also acknowledged "there is still a lot to be done to [...] keep diversity uppermost in our minds when taking the development decisions about which stories to focus on". In 2018, as deputy director of Film4, Bruce-Smith said that they had made use of Film London's Equal Access Network to hire people from more diverse backgrounds and, after Frances McDormand referenced the inclusion rider in her 2018 Academy Best Actress speech (for the Bruce-Smith backed Three Billboards Outside Ebbing, Missouri), explained the concept of the inclusion rider and said that McDormand was "throwing down the gauntlet to the industry" with her public mention.

== Personal life and death ==
She married Irish celebrity chef and journalist Hugo Arnold in 1992, and they had two children. The couple owned houses in Dublin and Tuscany, Italy, and would often have friends staying at both. Bruce-Smith was diagnosed with cancer in 2018, described as "long and hard" but which she faced with good humour. McQueen dedicated the premiere of their fourth film together, Widows, to her after the diagnosis. She died at home in Dublin on 2 May 2020, at the age of 62.

== Legacy ==
Bruce-Smith was well loved and respected in the industry, with Nick James saying that in January 2019, when she walked into a BAFTA screening theatre for an event in tribute to her, he "experienced such a joyous, instant explosion of applause" as he never had witnessed before. She received a special BAFTA in 2019 for Outstanding Contribution to Cinema. On receiving the special BAFTA, Bruce-Smith said: "I am very grateful to Bafta for this award and for prompting me to encourage all women out there not to limit themselves. Be properly ambitious and confident in your own ability to see that ambition realised."

Mike Downey, deputy chairman of the European Film Academy, wrote after her death that "Bruce-Smith's contribution to British, European and world cinema was immeasurable", and Pippa Harris, the chair of BAFTA, said that "her contribution to the UK film industry, and especially to Film Four and to independent film-making was immense". She was a passionate advocate for independent film, and was a member of the events committee of the British Independent Film Awards. Garnett lauds that Bruce-Smith "was pivotal in ushering [the] work [of] Steve McQueen, Andrea Arnold, Jon Glazer and Yorgos Lanthimos [...] through to audience and acclaim. She was central to the success of Mrs Brown, Slumdog Millionaire, Three Billboards Outside Ebbing, Missouri, Room, The Last King of Scotland, This Is England, You Were Never Really Here, Amy, and, most recently, the Oscar-winner The Favourite".

Mexican news outlet 24 horas noted that the news of Bruce-Smith's death had been reported all around the world, in recognition of "her legacy in the seventh art" (film), and James wrote in his tribute that appraisal of Bruce-Smith was "not only a reminder that the creative and financial elements of film are inextricably connected but also an admonition to auteurist magazines like this one [Sight & Sound] not to ignore or sideline such figures so much in future".

== Filmography ==
As development coordinator, marketing-distribution, or company executive unless noted.

Year	Title	Director	Notes	Ref(s)
1981	The Evil Dead	Sam Raimi	(at Palace)	
1982	The Draughtsman's Contract	Peter Greenaway	(at BFI)	
1984	A Nightmare on Elm Street	Wes Craven		
1984	The Company of Wolves	Neil Jordan		
1985	Letter to Brezhnev	Chris Bernard		
1986	Absolute Beginners	Julien Temple		
1986	Critters	Stephen Herek		
1987	The Last of England	Derek Jarman		
1988	Distant Voices, Still Lives	Terence Davies		
1988	Hairspray	John Waters		
1988	High Hopes	Mike Leigh		
1989	Scandal	Michael Caton-Jones		
1993	Naked	Mike Leigh		
1993	The Snapper	Stephen Frears		
1993	Wittgenstein	Derek Jarman		
1995	Persuasion	Roger Michell		
1996	Stonewall	Nigel Finch	Special Thanks	
1997	I Went Down	Paddy Breathnach		
1997	Mrs Brown	John Madden		
1999	East Is East	Damien O'Donnell		
2000	The House of Mirth	Terence Davies	Thanks	
2000	Sexy Beast	Jonathan Glazer		
2001	Charlotte Gray	Gillian Armstrong		
2001	Late Night Shopping	Saul Metzstein		
2001	My Brother Tom	Dom Rotheroe		
2001	The Warrior	Asif Kapadia	Thanks	
2003	The Actors	Conor McPherson		
2004	Dead Man's Shoes	Shane Meadows		
2004	In My Father's Den	Brad McGann	Executive producer	
2004	Trauma	Marc Evans	Executive producer	
2006	Hallam Foe	David Mackenzie		
2006	Isolation	Billy O'Brien		
2006	The King	James Marsh	Thanks	
2006	The Last King of Scotland	Kevin Macdonald		
2006	This Is England	Shane Meadows		
2007	And When Did You Last See Your Father?	Anand Tucker		
2007	Boy A	John Crowley		
2007	Far North	Asif Kapadia		
2008	Happy-Go-Lucky	Mike Leigh		
2008	How to Lose Friends & Alienate People	Robert B. Weide		
2008	Hunger	Steve McQueen		
2008	In Bruges	Martin McDonagh		
2008	Incendiary	Sharon Maguire		
2008	Slumdog Millionaire	Danny Boyle		
2010	127 Hours	Danny Boyle		
2010	Another Year	Mike Leigh		
2010	Chatroom	Hideo Nakata		
2010	Four Lions	Chris Morris		
2010	The Inbetweeners Movie	Ben Palmer		
2010	Never Let Me Go	Mark Romanek		
2010	Submarine	Richard Ayoade		
2011	The Deep Blue Sea	Terence Davies		
2011	The Future	Miranda July	Executive producer	
2011	The Iron Lady	Phyllida Lloyd		
2011	Kill List	Ben Wheatley		
2011	Shame	Steve McQueen		
2011	Tyrannosaur	Paddy Considine		
2011	Wuthering Heights	Andrea Arnold		
2012	Berberian Sound Studio	Peter Strickland		
2012	Hyde Park on Hudson	Roger Michell		
2012	The Imposter	Bart Layton		
2012	The Odyssey	Asif Kapadia	Short	
2012	On the Road	Walter Salles		
2012	The Pervert's Guide to Ideology	Sophie Fiennes		
2012	Seven Psychopaths	Martin McDonagh		
2012	Sightseers	Ben Wheatley		
2013	12 Years a Slave	Steve McQueen		
2013	A Field in England	Ben Wheatley		
2013	The Double	Richard Ayoade		
2013	How I Live Now	Kevin Macdonald		
2013	Le Week-End	Roger Michell	Executive producer	
2013	The Look of Love	Michael Winterbottom		
2013	The Selfish Giant	Clio Barnard		
2013	Starred Up	David Mackenzie		
2013	Under the Skin	Jonathan Glazer		
2014	'71	Yann Demange		
2014	A Most Wanted Man	Anton Corbijn		
2014	Black Sea	Kevin Macdonald		
2014	The Duke of Burgundy	Peter Strickland		
2014	Ex Machina	Alex Garland		
2014	Frank	Lenny Abrahamson		
2014	Jimmy's Hall	Ken Loach		
2014	Mr. Turner	Mike Leigh		
2014	The Riot Club	Lone Scherfig		
2015	45 Years	Andrew Haigh		
2015	Amy	Asif Kapadia		
2015	Carol	Todd Haynes		
2015	High-Rise	Ben Wheatley		
2015	Life	Anton Corbijn	Thanks	
2015	The Lobster	Yorgos Lanthimos		
2015	Macbeth	Justin Kurzel		
2015	Room	Lenny Abrahamson	Executive producer	
2015	Slow West	John Maclean		
2015	Suffragette	Sarah Gavron		
2015	Youth	Paolo Sorrentino	Executive producer	
2016	American Honey	Andrea Arnold		
2016	Billy Lynn's Long Halftime Walk	Ang Lee		
2016	Free Fire	Ben Wheatley		
2016	Our Kind of Traitor	Susanna White		
2017	Beast	Michael Pearce		
2017	Dark River	Clio Barnard		
2017	Disobedience	Sebastián Lelio		
2017	How to Talk to Girls at Parties	John Cameron Mitchell		
2017	I Am Not a Witch	Rungano Nyoni		
2017	Journeyman	Paddy Considine		
2017	The Killing of a Sacred Deer	Yorgos Lanthimos		
2017	Lean on Pete	Andrew Haigh		
2017	T2 Trainspotting	Danny Boyle		
2017	Three Billboards Outside Ebbing, Missouri	Martin McDonagh		
2017	Trespass Against Us	Adam Smith		
2017	You Were Never Really Here	Lynne Ramsay	Executive producer	
2018	American Animals	Bart Layton		
2018	The Favourite	Yorgos Lanthimos		
2018	The Little Stranger	Lenny Abrahamson		
2018	Peterloo	Mike Leigh		
2018	Widows	Steve McQueen	Producer	
2019	Calm with Horses	Nick Rowland	Executive producer	
2019	The Day Shall Come	Chris Morris	Executive producer	
2019	Dirt Music	Gregor Jordan	Executive producer	
2019	How to Build a Girl	Coky Giedroyc	Executive producer	
2019	The Personal History of David Copperfield	Armando Iannucci		
2019	Rocks	Sarah Gavron	Executive producer	
2019	True History of the Kelly Gang	Justin Kurzel	Executive producer	
2020	Dream Horse	Euros Lyn	Executive producer	
