= Jim Williams (composer) =

Jim Williams is an Ivor Novello Award and César Award nominated British TV and film composer and guitarist.

His television credits include: Auf Wiedersehen Pet, Hotel Babylon, Harley Street, Under the Greenwood Tree, Heartless, Wanted, The Gift, Lock, Stock..., Outlaws, Sorted and Minder. His film credits include four Ben Wheatley films Down Terrace, Kill List, Sightseers, and A Field in England, Julia Ducournau's Raw and Titane, and the British films The Dark Mile and Beast. His score for Raw was nominated for Best Original Music at the 2018 43rd César Awards and Beast for the BIFA for Best Music. His scores for Brandon Cronenberg's Possessor and Sidharth Srinivasan’s Kriya premiered at the Sundance Film Festival and the Fantasia Film Festival during 2020.
