= Amy Jump =

British screenwriter and editor

- Born: 1972 (age 53–54); Islington, London, England
- Occupations: Screenwriter, film editor, film producer
- Notable work: Sightseers, Kill List, A Field in England
- Spouse: Ben Wheatley
- Children: 1
- Awards: British Independent Film Award for Best Screenplay (Kill List and Sightseers)

Amy Jump (born 1972) is a British screenwriter, film editor and film producer. She is best known for writing and editing such films as Kill List (2011), A Field in England (2013) and High-Rise (2015). She and her husband, director Ben Wheatley, have been described by Creative Review as "one of the most formidable creative partnerships in film". Jump won a British Independent Film Award for Best Screenplay for both Kill List and Sightseers (2012).

== Life and work ==
Jump was born in Islington in 1972. She met her future husband and collaborator, director Ben Wheatley, while both were studying for their A-Levels. She encouraged Wheatley to study on the same foundation art course after graduation. The couple now live together in Brighton.

Jump and Wheatley's first collaboration was a series of short animations shared through their now-defunct website MrandMrsWheatley.com. This helped to launch their respective careers, as they moved through creating live-action shorts to creating commercial work. Since, the two have collaborated regularly on films. Jump wrote and co-edited and co-wrote the thrillers Kill List, Sightseers and Free Fire; she was also the sole author of A Field in England and High-Rise, all directed by Wheatley. The couple "tag-team" on co-written scripts, writing and rewriting each other's scenes and dialogue, without the need for discussion. Wheatley claims she revised all of the dialogue he wrote for Free Fire. Jump was also executive producer on Peter Strickland’s The Duke of Burgundy.

Jump does not give interviews or appear publicly to promote her films. Of working together, and of Jump's own approach to work and publicity, Wheatley has said:

I like the fact that we’re a couple making films, it makes it interesting... She’s completely outside of the industry, she doesn’t do interviews and doesn’t particularly like going up to London to events. She just wants to do the work, get in and get out. She’s not a cinephile, but she really cares about image and storytelling from her own unique perspective. But we’ve always had an agreement that I’ll be kind of like the face of it, I do all the press and that.

== Unrealized projects ==
Wheatley and Jump have multiple projects in development at any given time. As-yet unmade scripts of Jump's include a remake of The Wages of Fear, adaptations of the Frank Miller and Geof Darrow comic book Hard Boiled and the video game Gauntlet, an original sci-fi film called Freakshift and a romantic comedy inspired by What's Up, Doc?

In April 2019, she was hired to write a script for a planned sequel to Tomb Raider, with Wheatley later joining as director. The pair were replaced by writer-director Misha Green, before the project was cancelled entirely.

== Filmography ==
Year	Title	Writer	Editor	Producer	Other
2011	Kill List	Yes	Yes	–	–
2012	Sightseers	Yes – additional material	Yes	–	–
2013	A Field in England	Yes	Yes	–	–
2014	The Duke of Burgundy	–	–	Yes	–
2014	ABCs of Death 2	–	–	Yes	–
2015	High-Rise	Yes	Yes	–	–
2016	Free Fire	Yes	Yes	–	–
2018	Happy New Year, Colin Burstead	–	–	Yes	–
2020	Rebecca	–	–	-	Special Thanks
2021	In the Earth	–	–	Yes	–
