= Anna Higgs =

English film producer

- Occupation: Film producer
- Years active: 2006-present

Anna Higgs is a film producer known for 20,000 Days on Earth, Dark Horse and High-Rise. Higgs is a creative executive working at the intersection of film and digital storytelling. She is currently Director of Entertainment Partnerships at Facebook & Instagram in Northern Europe.

== Early life and career ==
Higgs co-founded production company Quark Films in 2006. From 2011 to 2015 Higgs joined Film4 as Commission Editor and Head of Digital of Film4.0 Her first feature film for Film4 was A Field in England. In 2012 she was selected as one of the inaugural Time Out ‘Culture 100’. From 2015 to 2017 Higgs was a creative director of NOWNESS. Higgs is serving as an elected member of the Film Committee Bafta since 2018.
