= Tank 432 =

- Directed by: Nick Gillespie
- Written by: Nick Gillespie
- Produced by: Finn Bruce; Jennifer Handorf
- Starring: Rupert Evans; Steve Garry; Deirdre Mullins; Michael Smiley; April Pearson; Tom Meeten; Alex March
- Cinematography: Billy J. Jackson
- Edited by: Tom Longmore
- Music by: Lumimarja Wilenius
- Production company: Belstone Pictures
- Release dates: 24 October 2015 (Film4 FrightFest); 22 August 2016
- Running time: 88 minutes
- Country: United Kingdom
- Language: English

Tank 432 (originally Belly of the Bulldog) is a 2015 British psychological horror film written and directed by Nick Gillespie. Gillespie had previously collaborated with Ben Wheatley, who executive produced. Rupert Evans, Deirdre Mullins, Steve Garry, Michael Smiley, April Pearson, and Gordon Kennedy, Tom Meeten, and Alex March star. Evans, Mullins, Garry, Smiley, Kennedy, Meeten portray mercenaries tasked with transporting a hostage (Pearson) and survivor (March) across a battlefield. Along the way, the mercenaries become trapped in an abandoned armoured personnel carrier they enter as refuge against an unseen enemy. (Despite the film's title, the vehicle portrayed is not a tank but a Type 432 armoured personnel carrier, a vehicle used to deploy infantry. The 432 was known in British Army service as the Bulldog, hence the two alternative film titles.) It premiered at the Fantasia International Film Festival.

== Plot ==
In a forest, mercenaries Reeves and Karlsson rejoin the rest of their squad – Gantz, Capper, Evans, commanding officer Smith, along with two hooded and bound captives. Reeves reports fleeing from a group of hostiles, as Karlsson sedates Capper, whose leg is badly wounded. Evans reports a farm and jeep nearby, and Smith orders them to investigate. At the farm, Reeves vomits after seeing a mysterious orange powder. Evans, already nervous, becomes increasingly erratic after finding the jeep's engine has been sabotaged in a gruesome manner. As Karlsson sedates Evans and tends to Capper, Reeves and Gantz explore the farm.

Reeves and Gantz find mercenaries, whom they refer to as "group D", and two other captives, all decapitated, in a barn. As they return, they hear music from a storage container. They find a woman inside, who panics when they turn off the music. Karlsson sedates her and Smith orders her brought along. An enemy flare is shot off, and Smith orders a retreat, leaving Capper behind. Gantz and Evan fire at a hooded figure before retreating, but Evan returns as Capper calls out. The rest flee through a field until they encounter an abandoned armoured personnel carrier. Seeking refuge, they throw out its cargo while Gantz fires at another hooded figure. One of the prisoners stabs Gantz, and Reeves kills her.

Once inside the vehicle, they hear noises from outside as attackers attempt to open the door, which Gantz then jams. Karlsson gives them tranquilizers to help them sleep. Smith orders Gantz to fix the tank. Gantz finds a rotting corpse in the front of the vehicle, but fails to start the engine. He sees another strange figure outside the viewport. Searching the vehicle for tools, they find bottles of orange powder labelled "Kratos". Annabella, the surviving prisoner, claims to be a teacher and explains it means "strength and power" in ancient Greek. She secretly pockets a flare gun from a toolcase.

Reeves dreams of the monster Gantz saw and an argument between Smith and the others about the notebook he constantly writes. He awakens and questions Annabella, who claims to not remember why she is there. The next morning, the argument Reeves dreamt occurs, but Smith refuses to show the notebook. Gantz attempts to repair the engine again, but cannot reach it. He reports an orange powder on the engine, before seeing a monstrous, gasmask-wearing enemy outside the vehicle. After being calmed, he refuses to return, and Karlsson sedates him. Smith orders Reeves to attempt to fix the engine next. Karlsson begins looking through files stored in the vehicle, and finds they are dossiers on the mercenaries and their captives, identifying them as dead, including Smith. Smith expresses disbelief, saying he did not expect that many casualties, but claims he doesn't know anything. Reeves inspects the corpse in the front of the vehicle, and finds that the dog tags are for Evans.

As Reeves attempts to fix the engine, Capper appears and taunts them, refusing to open the hatch. He suggests Smith knows what is going on, and asks Karlsson if she knows with what she has been injecting everyone. As Smith and Karlsson argue, Annabella shoots Smith with the flare gun, killing him. Karlsson kills her, before realizing she was accidentally shot by Smith when he was attacked. Before Karlsson dies, she reads through Smith's mission notes, finding that Smith has been recording the dosages of the red-tinted sedative.

Reeves is able to start the engine. Egged on by Capper, who ingests Kratos, Reeves attempts to run him over. Capper eventually trips and falls, and challenges Reeves to run him over, which Reeves does. Later, after Reeves has stopped the vehicle, the rescued woman wakes and discovers everyone but Reeves dead. She finds the hatch is no longer jammed, opening it easily, and flees. Figures in hazmat suits and gas masks arrive, along with a gas masked man in a suit. Finding a survivor in the vehicle, he declares "It worked, good." before ordering Reeves killed. The forest from the start is shown again, as a loudspeaker announces that an experiment is about to begin, and a soldier emerges from a white box.

== Cast ==
- Rupert Evans as Reeves
- Deirdre Mullins as Karlsson
- Steve Garry as Gantz
- Michael Smiley as Capper
- April Pearson as Annabella, a hostage
- Gordon Kennedy as Smith
- Tom Meeten as Evans
- Alex March as the test subject

Neil Maskell makes a cameo as the voice of the announcer, and Nick Gillespie appears as the businessman.

== Production ==
Writer-director Nick Gillespie had collaborated with executive producer Ben Wheatley on several films previously, including Kill List. Smiley had also appeared in that film. Besides Wheatley, Gillespie cited Clive Barker as an influence. Although the film was not meant to be deeply political, Gillespie used imagery reminiscent of the Abu Ghraib Prison Scandal to subvert viewer expectations about the prisoners. When they are revealed to be young women, Gillespie said it is meant to signify that "something's not quite right there". Of the film's plot, Gillespie said it was designed to allow viewers to come to their own conclusions, as he found it more interesting to offer clues than direct answers.

== Release ==
Tank 432 premiered at the Fantasia International Film Festival on 23 July 2016. It was released on DVD in the UK on 22 August, and IFC Films released it to video on demand in the US on 25 November 2016.

== Reception ==
Rotten Tomatoes, a review aggregator, reports that 13% of eight surveyed critics gave the film a positive review; the average rating is 4.5/10. Metacritic rated it 43/100 based on seven reviews. Frank Scheck of The Hollywood Reporter wrote that it "makes the familiar mistake of confusing obscurity with tension". Scheck further described it as "an occasionally intriguing but frustratingly oblique high-concept genre exercise that mainly induces tedium, not to mention claustrophobia". Writing in Film Journal International, Maitland McDonagh called it a "claustrophobic thriller with a disappointing payoff". Commenting on the plot, McDonagh said the film delivers many bizarre twists but "plays fair" in the climax. Ben Kenigsberg of The New York Times called it a "high concept tease" with an unsatisfying conclusion and plot possibly kept vague to hide its lack of originality.

At the Los Angeles Times, Noel Murray called the film "more tedious and confusing" than ambiguous. Murray concluded, "A few memorable shots don't offer enough justification to watch a film that's not scary, rarely exciting and never as engrossing a puzzle as it means to be." Chuck Wilson of The Village Voice compared the plot negatively to The Outer Limits, calling the film a "busy but tedious thriller". In rating it 3/5 stars, Drew Tinnin of Dread Central praised the cinematography and acting but said answers to the film's plot come too late and are not satisfying. In recommending it for fans of atmospheric films, Patrick Cooper of Bloody Disgusting wrote, "This bad boy is all mood and atmosphere – at times feeling like an exercise in tension and dread more than a narrative."
