= Laurie Rose (cinematographer) =

English cinematographer

Laurie Rose (born 20 December) is an English cinematographer based in Brighton.

== Career ==
He has collaborated with director Ben Wheatley on films such as Down Terrace, High-Rise, Free Fire and the 2020 adaptation of Daphne du Maurier's Rebecca.

== Filmography ==
=== Film ===
Year	Title	Director	Notes
2009	Down Terrace	Ben Wheatley	
2011	Kill List	Ben Wheatley	
2012	Sightseers	Ben Wheatley	
2013	The Stone Roses: Made of Stone	Shane Meadows	Documentary
2013	A Field in England	Ben Wheatley	
2015	High-Rise	Ben Wheatley	
2015	Bill	Richard Bracewell	
2016	Free Fire	Ben Wheatley	
2017	Journey's End	Saul Dibb	
2017	The Escape	Dominic Savage	
2017	Journeyman	Paddy Considine	
2018	Overlord	Julius Avery	Shared credit with Fabian Wagner
2018	Happy New Year, Colin Burstead	Ben Wheatley	
2018	Stan & Ollie	Jon S. Baird	
2019	Pet Sematary	Kevin Kölsch; Dennis Widmyer	
2020	Archive	Gavin Rothery	
2020	Summerland	Jessica Swale	
2020	Freaky	Christopher Landon	
2020	Rebecca	Ben Wheatley	
2022	La Voix Humaine	James Kent	
2022	Catherine Called Birdy	Lena Dunham	
2022	Rosaline	Karen Maine	
2025	The Haunted Moustache	Andrew Starke	
2026	Midwinter Break	Polly Findlay	
2026	Madfabulous	Celyn Jones	

=== Television ===
Year	Title	Director	Notes
2013	The Job Lot	Martin Dennis	5 episodes
2013	Him & Her	Richard Laxton	5 episodes
2013	Raised by Wolves	Ian Fitzgibbon	Episode "Pilot"
2014	Friday Night Dinner	Martin Dennis	6 episodes
2014	Cuckoo	Ben Taylor	Episode "Christmas Special"
2014	Give Out Girls	Chole Thomas	6 episodes
2015	Cockroaches	Ben Taylor	2 episodes
2015	London Spy	Jakob Verbruggen	Miniseries
2016	Peaky Blinders	Tim Mielants	6 episodes
2016	Fleabag	Tim Kirkby	Episode "Pilot"
2017	Riviera	Philipp Kadelbach	Episodes "Villa Carmella" and "Faussaires"
2021	Invasion	Jakob Verbruggen; Jamie Payne; Amanda Marsalis	9 episodes
2023	Silo	Bert and Bertie	Episodes "The Flamekeepers" and "The Relic"
2024	Apples Never Fall	Dawn Shadforth	Episodes "Amy", "Brooke" and "Troy"
2024	The Lord of the Rings: The Rings of Power	Louise Hooper	5 episodes
2024	The Day of the Jackal	Anu Menon	2 episodes
2025	Talamasca: The Secret Order	Louise Hooper	Episodes "The Puzzle Palace" and "The 752"
2026	Mercenary: An Extraction Series	Louise Hooper	4 episodes

== Recognition ==
In 2014, Complex included him on the "Underrated Cinematographers Poised to Make It Big in 2015" list. In 2016, Variety included him on the "10 Cinematographers to Watch" list.

In that same year, he became a member of the British Society of Cinematographers.

At the 2016 British Academy Television Craft Awards, he won the Photography & Lighting: Fiction award for his work on London Spy.
