= Free Fire (film) =

2016 British action comedy film

- British release poster
- Directed by: Ben Wheatley
- Written by: Amy Jump; Ben Wheatley
- Produced by: Andy Starke
- Starring: Sharlto Copley; Armie Hammer; Brie Larson; Cillian Murphy; Jack Reynor; Babou Ceesay; Enzo Cilenti; Sam Riley; Michael Smiley; Noah Taylor
- Cinematography: Laurie Rose
- Edited by: Amy Jump; Ben Wheatley
- Music by: Ben Salisbury; Geoff Barrow
- Production companies: Film4 Productions; BFI; Rook Films; Protagonist Pictures
- Distributed by: StudioCanal
- Release dates: 8 September 2016 (TIFF); 31 March 2017 (United Kingdom)
- Running time: 90 minutes
- Country: United Kingdom
- Language: English
- Budget: $7 million
- Box office: $3.8 million

Free Fire is a 2016 British action comedy film directed by Ben Wheatley, from a screenplay by Wheatley and Amy Jump. It stars Sharlto Copley, Armie Hammer, Brie Larson, Cillian Murphy, Jack Reynor, Babou Ceesay, Enzo Cilenti, Sam Riley, Michael Smiley and Noah Taylor.

The film had its world premiere at the Toronto International Film Festival on 8 September 2016, and also served as the closer of the 2016 BFI London Film Festival on 16 October. The film was theatrically released in the United Kingdom on 31 March 2017, by StudioCanal UK, and in the United States on 21 April 2017, by A24.

== Plot ==
On a cold night in 1978, while driving to meet IRA members Chris and Frank, Stevo tells Bernie that he was beaten up the previous day by the cousin of a woman he assaulted. The group meet outside a Boston warehouse with intermediary Justine, and a representative, Ord, leads them inside. The group is there to buy guns from arms dealer Vernon and his associates, Martin, Harry, and Gordon. Despite tensions between the two groups and the fact that Vernon supplied the wrong rifles, the weapons are unloaded from a van and Chris' group hands over the money in a briefcase.

Stevo realizes that Harry was the one who beat him up the day before, and refuses to go near him, irritating Frank. Harry eventually notices and lashes out at Stevo, furthering the tensions between the groups. Stevo seemingly apologises, but then brags about what he did to Harry's cousin. Infuriated, Harry shoots Stevo in the shoulder. Both groups split off and begin shooting at each other. Martin, who was holding the briefcase, is grazed by a bullet in the head and collapses. The briefcase now lies in the open, with Vernon attempting to coerce his men to get it.

Bernie is shot in the back by Vernon as he attempts to leave and dies shortly after. Soon, two hit-men with rifles begin shooting at both groups. One of them, Jimmy, is killed, and the other is recognised by Ord as Howie, who explains that he was hired to kill everyone and take the money. Before Howie can reveal who hired him, he is shot dead by Chris's group. Chris, defending Justine, requests that Vernon's group let her go. Gordon crawls after her, intent on killing her.

As the shooting continues, a telephone rings in one of the offices. Realising that they can call for backup, Chris sends the wounded Frank to the office, pursued by a wounded Vernon. Gordon chases Justine to the warehouse entrance, but she manages to kill him. As Chris, Ord, Stevo and Harry engage in another shootout, Vernon is severely burned by a fire set by Frank but manages to kill him as he reaches the phone.

Martin suddenly regains consciousness and begins deliriously shooting at his own group. He reveals that he planned to double-cross Vernon and hired Howie and Jimmy to kill the others. Martin gets the briefcase, but soon dies from his injuries. After getting past Ord and Harry, Chris reaches the office and kills Vernon. Using the phone to call his associates, Chris is cut off by Ord while Harry distracts Stevo. Returning to the warehouse, Justine takes Jimmy's rifle but passes out.

One of Chris's associates, Leary, arrives at the warehouse in search of his IRA comrades, but is beaten to death by Harry. Taking the briefcase, Harry attempts to escape in the van while being fired at by Stevo and Ord. Harry runs over Stevo's head, killing him, but not before Stevo shoots Harry through the bottom of the van, killing him as well. The fire Frank caused spreads and the sprinklers come on. Exhausted and out of bullets, Ord and Chris agree to stop fighting, take the money, and attempt to escape before the inevitable arrival of the police.

Justine shoots Ord in the head and, unintentionally, Chris in the stomach. As Chris lies on the ground, succumbing to his wounds, Justine tells him she regrets that he got in the way. They exchange some last banter, and Justine limps towards the exit with the money, but the sound of sirens grows louder. When red and blue flashing lights appear under the bottom of the exit, Justine realizes that although she survived, she will not escape.

== Cast ==
- Cillian Murphy as Chris
- Armie Hammer as Ord
- Brie Larson as Justine
- Sharlto Copley as Vernon
- Jack Reynor as Harry
- Babou Ceesay as Martin
- Enzo Cilenti as Bernie
- Sam Riley as Stevo
- Michael Smiley as Frank
- Noah Taylor as Gordon
- Patrick Bergin as Howie
- Tom Davis as Leary
- Mark Monero as Jimmy

== Production ==
In October 2014, Olivia Wilde, Luke Evans, Armie Hammer, Cillian Murphy and Michael Smiley joined the cast of the film, with Ben Wheatley set to direct from a screenplay he wrote with Amy Jump. Wheatley and Andy Starke produced under their Rook Films banner, and Film4 Productions produced and financed the film. In April 2015, Brie Larson replaced Wilde, who had to drop out due to a schedule conflict.

=== Filming ===
Principal photography on the film began on 8 June 2015 in Brighton, East Sussex. Production concluded on 17 July 2015.

Most of the film was shot in the former print hall of The Argus newspaper in Hollingbury, Brighton. Dock scenes were filmed at Shoreham Port.

== Release ==
In February 2015, it was announced that StudioCanal had acquired distribution rights to the film in the United Kingdom, while Sony Pictures Worldwide Acquisitions had acquired the rights including Australia, New Zealand, Latin America, Scandinavia, Eastern Europe and Spain among others. In November 2015, it was announced that Alchemy had acquired United States distribution rights to the film. However, on 10 March 2016, in the wake of rumours of Alchemy's financial troubles, distribution of the film was bought by A24. The film had its world premiere at the Toronto International Film Festival, and served as the closing night film of the London Film Festival, on 16 October 2016. The film was released in the United Kingdom on 31 March 2017, and in the United States on 21 April 2017.

== Reception ==
=== Box office ===
Free Fire grossed $1.4 million in the United States and Canada, and $1.2 million in other territories, for a total of $2.6 million.

In the United States and Canada, Free Fire opened alongside The Promise, Born in China, Unforgettable and Phoenix Forgotten, and was projected to gross around $3 million from 1,070 cinemas in its opening weekend. However, it ended up debuting to $994,430, finishing 17th at the box office.

=== Critical response ===
On review aggregator Rotten Tomatoes, Free Fire has an approval rating of 70%, based on 237 reviews, with an average rating of 6.1/10. The website's critical consensus reads, "Free Fire aims squarely for genre thrills, and hits its target repeatedly and with great gusto—albeit with something less than pure cinematic grace." On Metacritic, which assigns a weighted average to reviews, the film has a score of 63 out of 100, based on 39 critics, indicating "generally favourable reviews".
