= The Last Tycoon (TV series) =

American television series

- Genre: Drama
- Based on: The Last Tycoon by F. Scott Fitzgerald
- Developed by: Billy Ray
- Starring: Matt Bomer; Kelsey Grammer; Lily Collins; Dominique McElligott; Enzo Cilenti; Koen De Bouw; Mark O'Brien; Rosemarie DeWitt
- Composer: Mychael Danna
- Country of origin: United States
- Original language: English
- No. of seasons: 1
- No. of episodes: 9

Production
- Executive producers: Christopher Keyser; Joshua D. Maurer; Billy Ray; David A. Stern; Alixandre Witlin
- Production locations: Los Angeles, California
- Cinematography: Daniel Moder
- Editor: Christopher Gay
- Running time: 51–61 minutes
- Production companies: Kippster Entertainment; City Entertainment; Brady American Productions; Home Run Productions, Inc. Amazon Studios; TriStar Television

Original release
- Network: Amazon Prime Video
- Release: June 16, 2016 – July 28, 2017

The Last Tycoon is an American television series, originating from a pilot produced in 2016 as part of Amazon Studios' seventh pilot season. The show stars Matt Bomer and Kelsey Grammer and is loosely based on F. Scott Fitzgerald's last book, the unfinished and posthumously published 1941 novel The Last Tycoon. Amazon picked up the pilot to series on July 27, 2016. The first season premiered on July 28, 2017. On September 9, 2017, Amazon cancelled the series.

== Premise ==
Based on F. Scott Fitzgerald's last book The Last Tycoon (published posthumously), the show takes place in 1936 Hollywood. Monroe Stahr, loosely based on the producer Irving Thalberg, battles his boss Pat Brady.

== Cast ==
=== Main ===
- Matt Bomer as Monroe Stahr (born Milton Sternberg), a movie producer with a terminal heart condition, working under a false name to hide his Jewish ancestry
- Kelsey Grammer as Pat Brady, head of Brady American, a Hollywood picture studio
- Lily Collins as Cecelia Brady, Pat's daughter, romantically interested in Monroe
- Dominique McElligott as Kathleen Moore, a waitress and Monroe's new girlfriend
- Enzo Cilenti as Aubrey Hackett (born Enzo Resteghini), a cynical writer working for Monroe
- Koen De Bouw as Tomas Szep, a German covert assistant of Pat Brady
- Mark O'Brien as Max Miner, a poor man from Oklahoma, discreetly working for Pat Brady
- Rosemarie DeWitt as Rose Brady, Pat's wife, having an affair with Monroe

=== Recurring ===
- Vince Nappo as Landon Aames, a novelist turned screenwriter, often in over his head
- Bailey Noble as Bess Burrows, Pat Brady's mistress
- Whitney Rice as Mary Greer, Monroe's secretary
- Kerry O'Malley as Kay Maloney, another of Monroe's screenwriting team
- Saul Rubinek as Louis B. Mayer
- Iddo Goldberg as Fritz Lang, a German émigré, directing the "An Enemy Among Us" picture for Monroe
- Danielle Rose Russell as Darla Miner, Max Miner's younger sister, dreams of becoming an actor
- Annika Marks as Bernadette Davis, a recently widowed screenwriter
- Jennifer Beals as Margo Taft, an uncompromising movie star Brady American needs
- Jessica De Gouw as Minna Davis, actress, Monroe's deceased wife
- Michael Siberry as Georg Gyssling, a German consul
- Melia Kreiling as Hannah Taub, a German musician fleeing the Nazis

=== Guest stars ===
- Seth Fisher as Irving Thalberg ("More Stars Than There Are in Heaven")
- Larry Cedar as Dr. Harold Grife ("More Stars Than There Are in Heaven")
- Stefanie von Pfetten as Marlene Dietrich ("Burying the Boy Genius")
- Rob Brownstein as Jack Warner ("Eine Kleine Reichmusik")
- Nick Lehane as Frank Capra ("An Enemy Among Us")
- Joshua Weinstein as George Cukor ("An Enemy Among Us")

== Episodes ==
| No. | Title | Directed by | Written by | Original release date |
|---|---|---|---|---|
| 1 | "Pilot" | Billy Ray | Billy Ray | June 17, 2016 |
| 2 | "Nobody Recasts Like Monroe" | Billy Ray | Story by : Billy Ray and Christopher Keyser; Teleplay by : Billy Ray | July 28, 2017 |
| 3 | "More Stars Than There Are in Heaven" | Julie Anne Robinson | Story by : Billy Ray and Christopher Keyser; Teleplay by : Billy Ray | July 28, 2017 |
| 4 | "Burying the Boy Genius" | Scott Hornbacher | Story by : Billy Ray and Christopher Keyser; Teleplay by : Billy Ray | July 28, 2017 |
| 5 | "Eine Kleine Reichmusik" | Gwyneth Horder-Payton | Story by : Billy Ray and Christopher Keyser; Teleplay by : Christopher Keyser | July 28, 2017 |
| 6 | "A Brady-American Christmas" | Stacie Passon | Julia Cox and Katie Robbins | July 28, 2017 |
| 7 | "A More Perfect Union" | Daisy von Scherler Mayer | Anna Fishko | July 28, 2017 |
| 8 | "An Enemy Among Us" | Scott Hornbacher | Peter Parnell | July 28, 2017 |
| 9 | "Oscar, Oscar, Oscar" | Billy Ray | Story by : Billy Ray and Christopher Keyser; Teleplay by : Christopher Keyser | July 28, 2017 |

== Reception ==
Review aggregator website Rotten Tomatoes gave the show a score of 45% based on 42 reviews, with an average rating of 5.4/10. The website's critics consensus reads, "This old-fashioned tour through F. Scott Fitzgerald's vision of Hollywood has lush production values and an attractive varnish of glamorous pedigree, but lacks a storytelling hook or a compelling character to latch onto - resulting in an inert bauble that is pleasing to look at but elusive to feel." On Metacritic, the show holds a weighted average score of 57 out of 100 based on 30 critics, indicating "mixed or average reviews".
