= Enzo Cilenti =

English actor (born 1974)

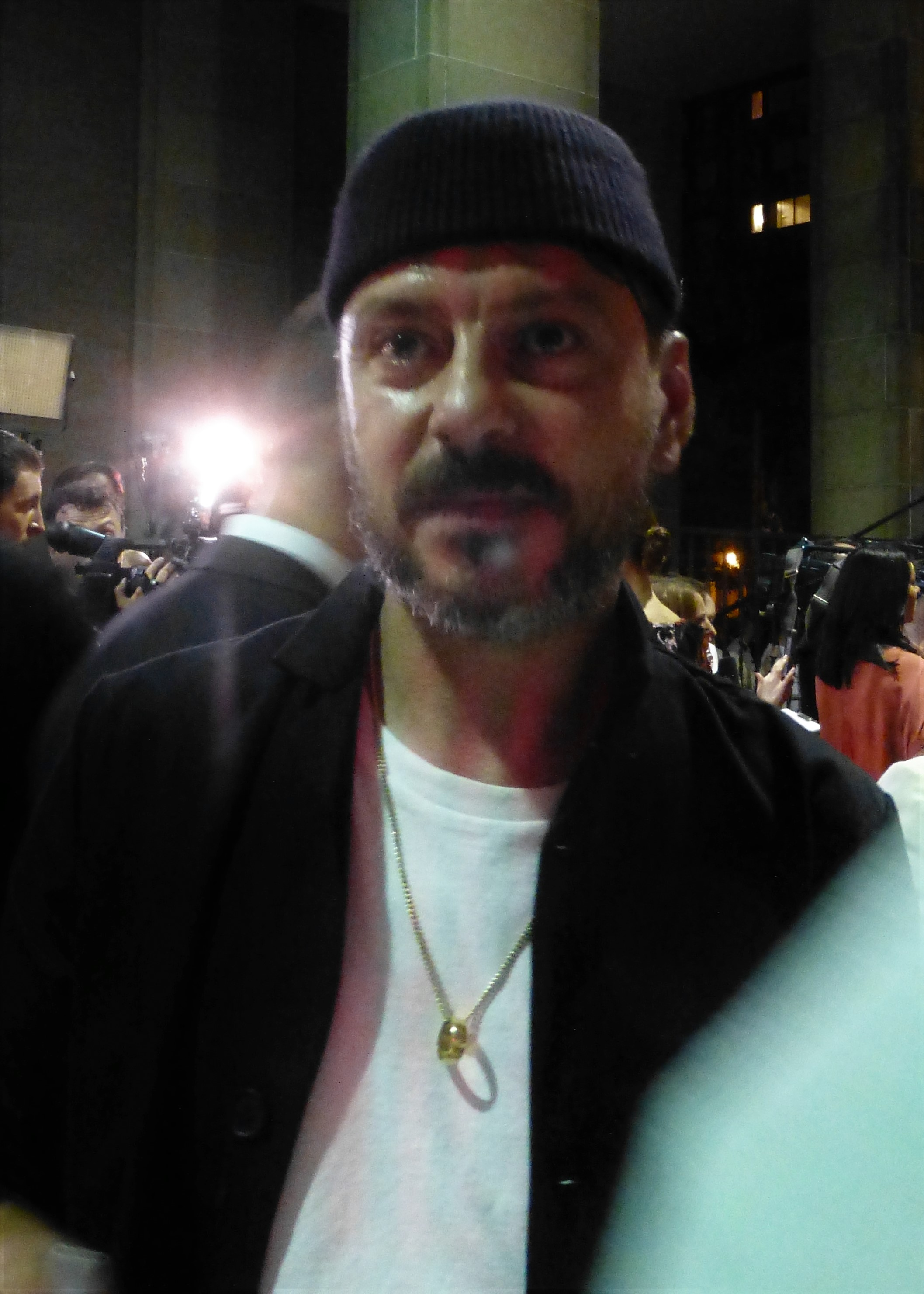
- Cilenti at the premiere of Free Fire at Toronto Film Festival, 2016
- Born: Vincenzo Leonardo Cilenti; 8 August 1974 (age 52); Bradford, West Yorkshire, England
- Education: Bradford Grammar School; University of Nottingham - (BA)
- Years active: 1998–present
- Spouse: Sienna Guillory (m. 2002)
- Children: 2

Vincenzo Leonardo "Enzo" Cilenti (born 8 August 1974) is a British actor. His film credits include Wonderland (1999), 24 Hour Party People (2002), Millions (2004), Guardians of the Galaxy (2014), The Theory of Everything (2014), The Martian (2015), High-Rise (2015), Bridget Jones's Baby (2016), Greed (2019), Heart of Stone (2023), The Beekeeper (2024).

Cilenti's television credits include Spooks (2003), Rome (2005), NCIS (2006–2007), Wolf Hall (2015), Jonathan Strange & Mr Norrell (2015), Lady Chatterley's Lover (2015), Jekyll and Hyde (2015), Game of Thrones (2015–2016), The Last Tycoon (2016–2017), Luther (2019), Les Misérables (2019), Breeders (2021), Domina (2021), The Serpent Queen (2022–2024), The Crown (2023), and Black Mirror episode "Hotel Reverie" (2025).

== Early life ==
Cilenti was born 8 August 1974 in Bradford, West Yorkshire, to Italian parents from Foiano di Val Fortore, Benevento. He studied English literature, French, German, drama, rugby and debating at Bradford Grammar School. He furthered his education obtaining a degree in French and Hispanic Studies at the University of Nottingham.

Cilenti worked with his girlfriend, actress Sienna Guillory, in the 2001 film Late Night Shopping. The two were married in 2002, and they have continued to appear together in various works. In February 2011, Guillory gave birth to their twin daughters, Valentina and Lucia, named after Guillory's grandmother and grand aunt, who were also twin sisters.

== Career ==
His first professional acting role came in Trial & Retribution, which led to the role of Grant in the world premiere of Liz Lochhead's Perfect Days at The Traverse Theatre, Edinburgh. Here he was spotted by Wendy Brazington who was casting Michael Winterbottom's Wonderland which at the time had the working title Snarl Up. He played graphic artist Peter Saville on his second collaboration with Winterbottom, the Palme d'Or-nominated 24 Hour Party People.

He has appeared in plays both on and off the West End, notably lead roles in Neil LaBute's The Shape of Things at The New Ambassadors Theatre, and the European premiere of the Pulitzer Prize-winning play Anna in the Tropics at the Hampstead Theatre.

In 2007, Cilenti had a recurring role in the CBS series NCIS as terrorist Mamoun Sharif.

He also performed at The Royal Court in a series of plays written and directed by Russian artists entirely in Russian; in Thai ballet as Orpheus in Backpacker Orpheus, a play devised entirely from people's experiences in the 2004 Indian Ocean earthquake; and in conceptual theatre for new-writing company Paines Plough in a series of shows (including a one-man show) commissioned over a number of seasons by Miuccia Prada to showcase collections for her Miu Miu line at Milan Fashion Week.

Cilenti also directed a short film called Getalife, and in 2015 produced, wrote and appeared in his first feature-length movie The Wicked Within.

His first novel, Mediterranean Homesick Blues, co-written with Ben Chatfield, was published in 2012. He appeared in Kick-Ass 2 (2013) and Guardians of the Galaxy (2014). In The Theory of Everything, he portrayed astrophysicist Kip Thorne.

In 2015 he joined the cast of the HBO series Game of Thrones in Season 5 as Yezzan zo Qaggaz. He also appeared in the BBC series Jonathan Strange & Mr Norrell in the role of Childermass.

In 2017, he played the part of Aubrey Hackett in the Amazon Studios series The Last Tycoon, which was released in July 2017. In 2019 he played the role of Joe Lyppiatt (in a gender-swap for the character Joanna) in Noël Coward's Present Laughter at the Old Vic in London opposite Andrew Scott.

in 2025, he appeared as an old black and white movie character 'Ralph Redwell' in Charlie Brooker's Netflix series Black Mirror, Season 7 Episode 3 "Hotel Reverie", working alongside Emma Corrin, Issa Rae, Awkwafina, and Harriet Walter.

== Filmography ==
=== Film ===
Year	Film	Role
1999	Wonderland	Darren
2001	Late Night Shopping	Lenny
2002	24 Hour Party People	Peter Saville
2004	Millions	Francis of Assisi
2005	Colour Me Kubrick	Waldegrave
2007	Next	Mr. Jones
2009	In the Loop	Bob Adriano
2009	The Fourth Kind	Scott Stracinsky
2009	Nine	Leopardi
2011	The Rum Diary	Digby
2013	Kick-Ass 2	Lou
2013	Supercollider	Leo Tarsky
2014	Guardians of the Galaxy	Watchtower Guard
2014	The Theory of Everything	Kip Thorne
2015	The Martian	Mike Watkins
2015	High-Rise	Adrian Talbot
2015	The Man Who Knew Infinity	Doctor
2016	Bridget Jones's Baby	Gianni
2016	Free Fire	Bernie
2016	The Man with the Iron Heart	Adolf Opálka
2018	Juliet, Naked	Barnesy
2019	Greed	Young Eric Weeks
2021	Outside the Wire	Miller
2022	Across the River and into the Trees	Gran Maestro
2023	Heart of Stone	Mulvaney
2024	The Beekeeper	Rico Anzalone

=== Television ===
Year	Title	Role	Notes
1998	Trial & Retribution	Antonio Bellini	2 episodes
1998	The Bill	Jerome Taylor	1 episode
2000	Heartbeat	Paolo Mazzetti	1 episode
2003	Spooks	Carlo Franceschini	4 episodes, uncredited
2003	Where the Heart Is	Carl	1 episode
2003	Coming Up	Tommy	1 episode
2005	No Angels	Joe	1 episode
2005	Rome	Evander Pulchio	4 episodes
2005	The Virgin Queen	Jean de Simier	Miniseries, 1 episode
2006–2007	NCIS	Mamoun Sharif	2 episodes
2011	Lie to Me	John Lightman	1 episode
2012	House	Matt Johnson	1 episode
2013	Prisoners' Wives	Mick	4 episodes
2015	Wolf Hall	Antonio Bonvisi	Miniseries, 2 episodes
2015	Jonathan Strange & Mr Norrell	John Childermass	Miniseries, 7 episodes
2015	Lady Chatterley's Lover	Victor Linley	Television film
2015	Jekyll and Hyde	Captain Dance	Main role, 8 episodes
2015–2016	Game of Thrones	Yezzan zo Qaggaz	4 episodes
2016	Hooten & the Lady	Tramacca	1 episode
2016	Grantchester	Felix Davis	1 episode
2016–2017	The Last Tycoon	Aubrey Hackett	Main role, 9 episodes
2019	Luther	Jeremy Lake	4 episodes
2019	Les Misérables	Rivette	Miniseries, 4 episodes
2021	Breeders	George	3 episodes
2021	Domina	Tiberius Nero	Main role, 3 episodes
2021	The Girlfriend Experience	Sean	Recurring role, 7 episodes
2022–2024	The Serpent Queen	Cosimo Ruggeri	Main role
2023	The Crown	Mario Brenna	Guest, season 6, episode 2 "Two Photographs"
2025	Black Mirror	Ralph Redwell	Season 7 Episode 3 "Hotel Reverie"
2025	Alien: Earth	Petrovich	2 episodes
