= In the Earth =

2021 horror film

- Release poster
- Directed by: Ben Wheatley
- Written by: Ben Wheatley
- Produced by: Andy Starke
- Starring: Joel Fry; Reece Shearsmith; Hayley Squires; Ellora Torchia; John Hollingworth; Mark Monero
- Cinematography: Nick Gillespie
- Edited by: Ben Wheatley
- Music by: Clint Mansell
- Production companies: Neon; Rook Films; Protagonist Pictures
- Distributed by: Neon (United States); Universal Pictures Focus Features (International)
- Release dates: 29 January 2021 (Sundance); 16 April 2021 (United States); 17 June 2021 (United Kingdom)
- Running time: 107 minutes
- Countries: United Kingdom; United States
- Language: English
- Box office: $1.3 million

In the Earth (stylized as IN THE EⱯRTH) is a 2021 science fiction psychological horror film written and directed by Ben Wheatley. The film stars Joel Fry, Reece Shearsmith, Hayley Squires, Ellora Torchia, John Hollingworth, and Mark Monero.

In the Earth had its world premiere at the 2021 Sundance Film Festival on 29 January 2021, and was released in North America on 16 April 2021, by Neon.

== Plot ==
Martin Lowery is a scientist sent to a government-controlled outpost while an unspecified pandemic has ravaged the country. The outpost is located in an unusually fertile forested area outside Bristol to help in the studies and experiments of his former colleague and ex-lover Olivia Wendle regarding using mycorrhiza to increase crop efficiency. After passing a physical examination and meeting his park guide Alma at the lodge the government is renting, he learns of the local legend of Parnag Fegg, a woodland spirit. The following morning, Martin and Alma begin their two-day hike toward Olivia's site.

Alma informs Martin that Olivia has not been heard from in months. The pair come across an abandoned tent, with the remaining items indicating it belonged to a family. Martin is revealed to still have ringworm, which he told the doctor at the lodge had cleared up. The next night, Martin and Alma are assaulted by unknown assailants who also raid their camp, destroy their equipment, steal their shoes, and loot some of their supplies. Without his shoes, Martin badly cuts his foot.

They are approached by Zach, a man living in the woods who offers to lend the pair some shoes. Taking them to his own campsite, Zach disinfects and stitches Martin's wound and gives them both food and a drink. Martin and Alma begin to lose consciousness and realize they have been sedated. While they are unconscious, Zach takes ritualistic photos of them in strange clothes and positions and stitches a strange symbol and animal gut into Martin's arm.

Upon waking up, Zach describes the symbol as a mark to be seen by a presence in the woods, claimed by him to have once been an ancient sorcerer who placed his essence in a standing stone somewhere in the forest. Martin's foot becomes infected from his injury, and Zach sloppily amputates some of his toes with a hatchet.

Alma acquires a discarded blade to free herself and Martin before attacking Zach. Martin and Alma flee but become separated. Zach pursues Martin, who stumbles across a pair of bodies, presumed to be the owners of the abandoned camp. After encountering the standing stone, Martin is found and rescued by Olivia. Alma independently makes her way to the camp, and Zach is driven away by the amplified sound and lights set up around Olivia's site.

The next morning, Olivia cauterizes Martin's foot as she explains her project. She reveals that Zach is her ex-husband and that the pair were following the directions of a centuries-old book, the Malleus Maleficarum, with pages even older than the book woven in. He had been helping her to try and communicate with the entity that projects through the stone, using the lights and noise from an electronic soundboard, but disapproved of her approach and left. Unable to trust Olivia and fearing that Zach is still after them, Alma tries to convince Martin that they need to leave. Still drawn to Olivia, he is reluctant to do so, since she refuses to abandon her research.

The next morning, the site is surrounded by a thick mist containing fungal spores, trapping them. They send Alma through the mist in a hazmat suit, but the spores make it through her protective clothing and subject her to horrifying visions. That night, the mist continues to close in on the site as Zach arrives, telling them to communicate with the standing stone using the sounds and lights as well as to consume a "sacrament," a mixture of ground mushrooms alluded to in the book.

Martin agrees to drink the sacrament and waits for it to take effect. Zach ambushes Alma and prepares to sacrifice Martin. Alma makes her way back to camp, where she finds Olivia in her tent surrounded by staged photographs of her and Zach's victims. Olivia attacks Alma, but she fends her off. Zach hears their struggle and rushes back to camp, where Alma kills him. She then pursues Olivia back to the standing stone as the mist overtakes the camp, and they are all subjected to more visions, the mycorrhiza directly communing with them.

By morning, Alma and Olivia have emerged from their otherworldly visions and find themselves far from the stone, dazed. Olivia collapses, overcome with awe. Alma makes her way to Martin, who, sleeping by the stone, wakes to see her leaning over him. Speaking with a distorted voice, she offers to guide him out of the woods.

== Cast ==
- Joel Fry as Martin Lowery
- Reece Shearsmith as Zach
- Hayley Squires as Olivia Wendle
- Ellora Torchia as Alma
- John Hollingworth as James
- Mark Monero as Frank

== Production ==
In September 2020, Ben Wheatley announced that he had written and directed a horror film over the course of 15 days in August. In November 2020, it was announced that the cast included Joel Fry, Ellora Torchia, Hayley Squires and Reece Shearsmith, and that Neon was set to distribute in the United States.

Clint Mansell, who has worked with the director Ben Wheatley in his previous films, composed the film score. Lakeshore Records & Invada Records has released the soundtrack.

In the Earth was then released on Blu-ray and DVD on 25 October 2021 by Universal Pictures Home Entertainment (through Warner Bros. Home Entertainment) in the UK.

== Release ==
The film had its premiere at the 2021 Sundance Film Festival on January 29, 2021, and was released in theatres on April 16, 2021. It was released on video on demand on May 7, 2021.

=== Critical response ===
On Rotten Tomatoes, the film holds an approval rating of 80% based on 170 reviews, with an average rating of 6.8/10. The site's critics consensus reads: "In The Earth's bleak kaleidoscope of horror is a meditation on the residual pandemic fears that haunt humanity." On Metacritic, the film has weighted average score of 63 out of 100, based on 35 critics, indicating "generally favorable" reviews.

Peter Bradshaw of The Guardian gave the film a score of 4/5 stars, writing that it "brings us back to Wheatley’s classic world of occult loopy weirdness and cult Britmovie seediness, with a new topical dimension of pandemic paranoia". Mark Kermode also gave the film a score of 4/5 stars in his review for The Observer, saying that it "combines humour and horror in terrifically bamboozling fashion, not least during a gruellingly extended amputation sequence that will have you squirming, laughing and wincing all at once." Linda Marric of The Jewish Chronicle also gave the film a score of 4/5 stars, describing it as "a brilliantly imagined, well acted and thoroughly compelling offering from a writer-director who is a cut above the rest when it comes to small scale horror productions."

Clarisse Loughrey of The Independent gave the film a score of 3/5 stars, writing: "In the Earth is a horror film with razor-sharp teeth, even if the relative flimsiness behind that facade betrays its spur-of-the-moment inception." Robbie Collin of The Daily Telegraph gave the film a score of 5/5 stars, describing it as "an outrageously entertaining film that feels utterly rooted in the bleak era in which it was made." Barry Hertz of The Globe and Mail wrote: "While I hope to never, ever watch In the Earth again, I must admit to admiring parts of it, too", and praised the film's use of dark humour. Matt Zoller Seitz of RogerEbert.com gave the film a score of 3/4 stars, writing: "Even though some sections feel rushed and it falls apart at the end, every part of it is memorable."

Michael O'Sullivan of The Washington Post was more critical of the film, giving it a score of 1.5/4 stars. He wrote that the film's setting "reads more like a peaceful suburban park than the “hostile environment” of the forest primeval it’s described as", and added: "the film has nothing interesting to say about pandemics." Randy Myers of The Mercury News gave the film a score of 2/4 stars, writing: "While it lacks the thematic punch of [Ben Wheatley's] High Rise, Earth deserves points for originality, but grows wobbly by its end." Kevin Maher of The Times gave the film a score of 2/5 stars, describing it as ending with "a prolonged blast of rapid-fire psychedelia that seemed like an outrageous narrative cop out."

Dread Corps, a UK-based horror website, also gave In the Earth a more critical review with a rating of 43/100, stating: "In the Earth fails to leave a lasting impression and fails to reach its full potential, particularly from such a talented director and cast".
