= Film4.0 =

Film financing division of Channel four Television Corporation

Film4.0 is a division of Film4, which is a film financing division of the British Channel Four Television Corporation. Film4.0 focuses on supporting innovative digital approaches to producing, marketing, and distributing films. The division was formed in May 2011, and Film4 invested £1 million of its annual budget of £15 million into the division. In the following July, Film4 appointed Anna Higgs to serve as commissioning editor of Film4.0. Variety reported a "focus on three main areas: commissioning new and established filmmakers working in the digital space in new and innovative formats; seeking new talent working in this area; and working across the Film4 slate to exploit new cross-platform audience-facing marketing opportunities."

In 2012, the division organized a competition called Scene Stealers and invited participants to make a short film (two minutes or under) that would reimagine scenes from past productions by Film4. The winners of the competition were The Brothers Lynch (Keith and David Lynch), whose reimagining was based on the 2006 film This Is England by Shane Meadows. Film4.0 awarded the winners a £5,000 development grant and mentoring to develop a short film project.

In September 2012, the film A Field in England became the first film to be developed and financed by Film4.0. The Film 4.0 division's functions were absorbed into the wider Film4 team and Channel 4's general digital-first strategy, with Head of Digital Commissioning (Channel 4), Laura Marks, leading the general digital-first content strategy for the broader channel and Senior Commissioning Executive (Film4), Cate Kane, alongside fellow executive David Kimbangi, taking on the responsibility of commissioning Film 4 films.
