= Sightseers =

2012 British film by Ben Wheatley

- American theatrical release poster
- Directed by: Ben Wheatley
- Written by: Alice Lowe; Steve Oram
- Produced by: Nira Park; Claire Jones; Andrew Starke
- Starring: Alice Lowe; Steve Oram
- Cinematography: Laurie Rose
- Edited by: Amy Jump; Ben Wheatley; Robin Hill
- Music by: Jim Williams
- Production companies: Film4; British Film Institute; Big Talk Pictures; Rook Films
- Distributed by: StudioCanal
- Release dates: 23 May 2012 (Cannes); 30 November 2012 (United Kingdom)
- Running time: 85 minutes
- Country: United Kingdom
- Language: English
- Box office: $2.1 million

Sightseers is a 2012 British black comedy film directed by Ben Wheatley and written by and starring Alice Lowe and Steve Oram.

Sightseers was selected to be screened in the Directors' Fortnight section at the 2012 Cannes Film Festival on 23 May 2012, where the lead animal actor, Banjo and Poppy, won the Palm Dog award. Was released in the United Kingdom on 30 November, by StudioCanal. The film received generally positive reviews from critics.

== Plot ==
Tina lives with her mother in suburban Redditch. Chris is a caravan fan and aspiring writer who takes Tina, his girlfriend, on a road trip, much to the chagrin of Tina's mother, who has never forgiven Tina for the death of their dog "Poppy". At their first stop, the National Tramway Museum, Chris confronts a man who is littering, and the man refuses to pick up his rubbish. When they get back to their car, Chris runs him over and kills him. Chris claims that the death was an accident, but smirks after the impact, unseen by Tina. Chris tells Tina that she is his muse.

They meet Janice, Ian and their dog Banjo (who resembles Poppy) at a caravan park and Janice reveals that Ian is a published writer, something that makes Chris jealous. The next morning Ian goes for a walk. Chris follows him, hits him in the head with a rock, steals his camera and pushes him off a cliff. Tina takes Banjo with them as they go. Tina finds photos of Ian and Janice on the camera and confronts Chris, who confesses to Ian's murder. Tina accepts this. During a walk through a National Trust park, Banjo defecates on the ground and a tourist tells Tina to clear up the mess. Chris arrives and encourages Tina to claim that the man tried to rape her. A row ensues, and Chris beats him to death.

At the next caravan park, Chris meets Martin, an engineer who is testing a mini-caravan that can be attached to the back of a bicycle. During a meal in a restaurant, Tina goes to the bathroom. When she returns, she finds Chris kissing the bride from the hen party at a nearby table as part of a bachelorette dare. Upset, Tina follows the bride outside and kills her by pushing her down a steep hill onto some rocks, observed by Chris. The next morning, instead of visiting a local tourist attraction, Chris says he is helping Martin make some modifications to his caravan. They argue, and Tina drives off alone. Upset, she calls her mother and is about to confess to the murders, when her mother hangs up. Later that night, Tina tries to seduce Chris by talking about their complicity in the murders, but he rejects her.

Chris wakes up to find Tina has left him sleeping in the caravan and is speeding down the highway. He calls her and tells her to pull over. Tina notices a jogger and runs him over. Chris is upset with her chaotic approach to the murders, believing himself to be justified in his choice of victims, and they argue before hiding the body at the side of the road. They drive to a mountain, where they set up camp with the Ribblehead Viaduct in sight, the final destination on their holiday. When a hailstorm forces them back inside the caravan, Chris falls asleep and Tina looks at his notebook, finding a drawing of her and Chris standing on the viaduct, about to jump.

Martin arrives, with Banjo in the mini-caravan. While Chris is outside, Tina tries to seduce Martin, who is made uncomfortable by her advances and rejects her. When Chris returns, she tells him that Martin propositioned her in a particularly implausible and repulsive manner. Martin returns to his mini-caravan, and Chris and Tina have a fight over whether the dog should be called by the name "Poppy" or "Banjo". Upset, Tina pushes Martin's mini-caravan off the cliff, with him still in it. She re-enters their caravan and tells Chris that the problem is over. He runs outside, and finds Martin's dead body. He insults Tina and they fight, which ends in them having sex.

Chris sets the caravan on fire and kisses Tina. They run to the Ribblehead Viaduct and climb to the top, holding hands. Chris asks Tina if she enjoyed the holiday and she says it was brilliant. He apologises for insulting her and asks if she really wants to kill herself. Just as Chris steps off the viaduct, Tina lets go of his hand, watching as he falls to his death. Tina stares at her hand as the screen cuts to black.

== Cast ==
- Steve Oram as Chris
- Alice Lowe as Tina
- Eileen Davies as Carol
- Monica Dolan as Janice
- Jonathan Aris as Ian
- Richard Lumsden as Rambler
- Richard Glover as Martin

== Production ==
The characters came together seven years before the film came as a stage experience with Lowe and Oram appearing as innocent campers who slowly revealed they were serial killers. A short film was later produced and was sent to several production companies, however despite being found to be funny, the pitch kept getting turned down for being too dark. They put the short online, and it generated some buzz, and Lowe sent the link to Edgar Wright, with whom she had worked on Hot Fuzz. Wright saw potential for a feature and put them in touch with a production company, Big Talk, who, with Wright on board as an executive producer, greenlit the project. Lowe and Oram did research into horror literature and even took a caravanning holiday, in character and with a cameraman, to the locations that would go on to be featured in the film. Ben Wheatley has said that all the locations were very helpful, even after they explained the nature of the film, because they "tried to make sure that it was open and fair to places, and that they weren't the butt of jokes."

The two were also inspired by Withnail and I.

== Reception ==
Critical reception has been positive; review aggregator Rotten Tomatoes reported an approval rating of 85% based on 106 reviews, with an average rating of 7.39/10. The website's critical consensus reads: "Director Ben Wheatley and writer-stars Alice Lowe and Steve Oram deliver a wicked road trip movie that successfully walks the line between dark comedy and horror." On Metacritic, the film has a weighted average score of 69 out of 100, based on 22 critics, indicating "generally favorable reviews".

Peter Bradshaw reviewed the film twice for The Guardian, first after its preview at Cannes, when he suggested "Wheatley could be suffering from difficult third album syndrome: this is not as mysterious and interesting as Kill List; its effects are more obvious and the encounters between the naturalistically conceived antiheroes and the incidental, sketch-comedy posh characters is a little uneasy. By the end, I got the sense that in terms of character and narrative the film was running out of ideas – just a bit." However, he viewed it again on its theatrical release and admitted that "when I first saw it, I think I might have got out of bed the right side" going on to say "a second viewing has further revealed just how superb are the effortless performances of Steve Oram and Alice Lowe, who are the movie's writers (working with Wheatley's longtime co-writer Amy Jump), and whose creative ownership makes a purely auteurist comparison with Kill List slightly less relevant." He suggests a number of parallels: "an obvious comparison with Mike Leigh's Nuts in May, and there are even traces of Victoria Wood and Alan Bennett, whose gentler, observational comedy is turned into something nightmarish, bringing in an exquisitely horrible Readers' Wives aesthetic", concluding that "[t]he chilling and transgressive flourishes are carried off with deadpan confidence; it's a distinctive and brutally unsettling piece of work." Kim Newman wrote in Empire that Sightseers is a "uniquely British blend of excruciating comedy of embarrassment and outright grue, not quite as disorientating in its mood shifts as Kill List, but just as impressive a film." The Guardian asked an editor of Caravan Magazine for his opinion and he thought the film, which he described as "absolutely brilliant", accurately captured the details of caravanning holidays.

However, the praise wasn't unanimous. The Financial Times' Nigel Andrews' conclusion was: "There are a few laughs; a few wise nods. But before the end fatigue arrives and doesn't go away."

The film went on to receive seven BIFA Nominations, including Best Supporting Actress for Eileen Davies, and winning the award for Best Screenplay.
