= British Independent Film Awards 2011 =

Annual British film awards ceremony

The 14th British Independent Film Awards, held on 4 December 2011 at the Old Billingsgate Market in central London, honoured the best British independent films of 2011.

== Awards ==
=== Best British Independent Film ===
- Tyrannosaur
- Senna
- Shame
- Tinker Tailor Soldier Spy
- We Need to Talk about Kevin

=== Best Director ===
- Lynne Ramsay – We Need to Talk about Kevin
- Ben Wheatley – Kill List
- Steve McQueen – Shame
- Tomas Alfredson – Tinker Tailor Soldier Spy
- Paddy Considine – Tyrannosaur

=== The Douglas Hickox Award ===
Given to a British director on their debut feature

- Paddy Considine – Tyrannosaur
- Joe Cornish – Attack the Block
- Ralph Fiennes – Coriolanus
- John Michael McDonagh – The Guard
- Richard Ayoade – Submarine

=== Best Actor ===
- Michael Fassbender – Shame
- Brendan Gleeson – The Guard
- Neil Maskell – Kill List
- Gary Oldman – Tinker Tailor Soldier Spy
- Peter Mullan – Tyrannosaur

=== Best Actress ===
- Olivia Colman – Tyrannosaur
- Rebecca Hall – The Awakening
- Mia Wasikowska – Jane Eyre
- MyAnna Buring – Kill List
- Tilda Swinton – We Need to Talk about Kevin

=== Best Supporting Actor ===
- Michael Smiley – Kill List
- Tom Hardy – Tinker Tailor Soldier Spy
- Benedict Cumberbatch – Tinker Tailor Soldier Spy
- Eddie Marsan – Tyrannosaur
- Ezra Miller – We Need to Talk about Kevin

=== Best Supporting Actress ===
- Vanessa Redgrave – Coriolanus
- Felicity Jones – Albatross
- Carey Mulligan – Shame
- Sally Hawkins – Submarine
- Kathy Burke – Tinker Tailor Soldier Spy

=== Best Screenplay ===
- Richard Ayoade – Submarine
- John Michael McDonagh – The Guard
- Ben Wheatley, Amy Jump – Kill List
- Abi Morgan, Steve McQueen – Shame
- Lynne Ramsay, Rory Stewart Kinnear – We Need to Talk about Kevin

=== Most Promising Newcomer ===
- Tom Cullen – Weekend
- Jessica Brown Findlay – Albatross
- John Boyega – Attack the Block
- Craig Roberts – Submarine
- Yasmin Paige – Submarine

=== Best Achievement in Production ===
- Weekend
- Kill List
- Tyrannosaur
- Wild Bill
- You Instead

=== Best Technical Achievement ===
- Maria Djurkovic – Production Design – Tinker Tailor Soldier Spy
- Chris King, Gregers Sall – Editing – Senna
- Sean Bobbitt – Cinematography – Shame
- Joe Walker – Editing – Shame
- Seamus McGarvey – Cinematography – We Need to Talk about Kevin

=== Best British Documentary ===
- Senna
- Hell and Back Again
- Life in a Day
- Project Nim
- TT3D: Closer to the Edge

=== Best British Short ===
- CHALK
- 0507
- LOVE AT FIRST SIGHT
- RITE
- ROUGH SKIN

=== Best Foreign Film ===
- A Separation
- Animal Kingdom
- Drive
- Pina
- The Skin I Live In

=== The Raindance Award ===
- Leaving Baghdad
- Acts of Godfrey
- Black Pond
- Hollow
- A Thousand Kisses Deep

=== The Richard Harris Award ===
- Ralph Fiennes

=== The Variety Award ===
- Kenneth Branagh

=== The Special Jury Prize ===
- Graham Easton
