= A Field in England =

- Theatrical release poster
- Directed by: Ben Wheatley
- Written by: Amy Jump
- Produced by: Claire Jones; Andrew Starke
- Starring: Julian Barratt; Peter Ferdinando; Richard Glover; Ryan Pope; Reece Shearsmith; Michael Smiley
- Cinematography: Laurie Rose
- Edited by: Amy Jump; Ben Wheatley
- Music by: Jim Williams
- Production companies: Film4; Rook Films
- Distributed by: Picturehouse Entertainment
- Release date: 5 July 2013
- Running time: 91 minutes
- Country: United Kingdom
- Language: Early Modern English
- Budget: £300,000
- Box office: $64,349

A Field in England is a 2013 British historical psychological horror film directed by Ben Wheatley and written by Amy Jump, a husband-and-wife team who also co-edited the film. Shot in black and white and set during the mid-17th-century English Civil War, it was simultaneously released on 5 July 2013 on multiple platforms including cinemas, home media, and video on demand. It was also broadcast on Film4 on the same day.

== Plot ==
During a field battle of the English Civil War in Monmouthshire, alchemist's assistant and astrologer Whitehead flees from the violent Commander Trower. He is saved by soldier Cutler, who kills Trower. The two meet fellow army deserters Jacob and Friend, and the group decides to leave the battlefield in search of an alehouse Cutler claims is nearby.

Instead, Cutler leads them to a field and cooks a meal using mushrooms growing nearby, encouraging everyone to eat; Whitehead declines, as he is fasting. Following the meal, they come upon a carved wooden post buried in the ground. The four use a rope to pull it out of ground, where they unbury the Wizard O'Neill, a rival alchemist who is Cutler's master — and the man who has stolen documents from Whitehead's master. Though Whitehead seeks to arrest him for his crime, O'Neill quickly asserts authority over the group, convincing them of hidden treasure buried elsewhere in the field.

O'Neill leads them to his camp, where he tortures Whitehead into subservience in order to use him as a human divining rod. After Whitehead locates treasure, O'Neill orders Jacob and Friend to dig for it while he leaves Cutler to supervise, retiring to sleep. Jacob soon succumbs to the influence of the mushrooms, attacking Friend in a bout of exhaustion and madness. Cutler laughs and urinates on them; when Jacob attempts to attack him, Cutler accidentally shoots Friend. Whitehead is unable to save Friend, who quickly dies. Cutler is forced to finish digging by himself, while Jacob wanders away and Whitehead moves Friend's corpse to a thicket.

Cutler eventually reaches the beginnings of treasure. O'Neill is awoken by his excitement and quickly realises the other men are missing. He pursues Whitehead, who ingests a massive amount of mushrooms: his awareness is greatly heightened, but he suffers a disturbing hallucinatory experience, wherein he conjures a violent wind to blow away the camp's tent.

Cutler discovers that the treasure is merely a skull, which he shoots in anger. He angrily berates O'Neill, blaming him for trusting Whitehead about the treasure and for lying to him about the alehouse, which was simply a ploy to entice Jacob and Friend. O'Neill promptly kills Cutler and then pursues Whitehead and Jacob, who scavenge Cutler's weapons and return to the overturned camp. As they are preparing for an attack, Friend appears alive and reveals their location to O'Neill. As Jacob throws Friend to the ground to stop him, O'Neill shoots Jacob in the gut, but Jacob returns fire breaking O'Neill's leg. Jacob dies from his injuries, after he and Whitehead surmise that the treasure was the friendship they shared. Friend brandishes Cutler's pike and charges O'Neill, but O'Neill kills him with his last shot. Whitehead takes advantage of the situation to finally kill O'Neill by shooting him in the back of the head.

Whitehead buries his friends' corpses in the treasure's hole and leaves the field. Wearing O'Neill's clothes, he gathers his master's stolen documents and returns to the hedgerow where he first met Cutler, Jacob, and Friend, from which battle sounds are rising. After he wades through the hedge, he sees Friend, Jacob and himself standing together.

== Cast ==
- Reece Shearsmith as Whitehead
- Michael Smiley as O'Neill
- Peter Ferdinando as Jacob
- Richard Glover as Friend
- Ryan Pope as Cutler
- Julian Barratt as Commander Trower

== Production ==
A Field in England is directed by Ben Wheatley and based on a screenplay by Amy Jump. Wheatley became interested in the film's historical setting of the English Civil War when he filmed a documentary about the Sealed Knot, a historical reenactment society. In his research, Wheatley also learned about the use of hallucinogens during the 17th century. He said, "People were grinding mushrooms into dust and blowing it into people's faces and then doing magic tricks." Wheatley sought funding to produce the film, which he had planned for years. The film was ultimately developed and financed by Film4.0, a division of Film4 that serves as an innovation hub. Variety reported that the film was described as "a psychedelic trip into magic and madness". Wheatley said A Field in England combines "the more psychedelic elements" from his previous films Kill List and Sightseers and "weaves in our take on historical drama" with the English Civil War.

The film was shot in black-and-white. The Observer said the style was part of a resurgence with films like The Artist, Much Ado About Nothing, Frances Ha and Nebraska. Wheatley said he and cinematographer Laurie Rose made a spontaneous decision to film in black-and-white. Wheatley and Rose watched Culloden and other films by Peter Watkins, as well as arthouse films from the 1960s and 1970s, to explore the style. The pair experimented with camera tests before filming A Field in England and committed to the "unfussy" style. With a production budget of £300,000, filming began in late September 2012. It took place in the countryside outside Guildford in Surrey. Filming lasted for 12 days.

== Release ==
A Field in England screened in competition at the 48th Karlovy Vary International Film Festival on 4 July 2013, where it won the Special Jury Prize. It was released in the United Kingdom on 5 July 2013 through several platforms simultaneously. The Hollywood Reporter said, "A Field in England will mark the first time a homegrown title has been released simultaneously in theaters, on DVD, free TV and video-on-demand." The film had received funding from the BFI Distribution Fund New Models strand, "which supports experimental release models". Film4 and its arms 4DVD and Film4 Channel collaborated with distributor Picturehouse Entertainment and with the BFI Distribution Fund for the rollout. Wheatley compared the multi-platform release to how the band Radiohead released its album In Rainbows for free.

Drafthouse Films acquired the rights to distribute the film in North America. It partnered with Cinedigm in September 2013, and they released the film on 6 February 2014 on various platforms and formats.

For the cinema release of A Field in England in the UK, Weltons Brewery brewed a limited-edition ale to give to cinema-goers. The beer had the tagline "Open Up and Let the Devil In" to tie into the use of hallucinogens in the film. The ale was bottled with yeast, which required a slow pour to ensure "continuous secondary fermentation" for the beer to be fresh.

== Reception ==
The film received positive reviews. On film aggregation website Rotten Tomatoes, it has an 86% rating, with an average score of 7.2/10, based on reviews from 67 critics. The site's consensus reads, "Recklessly assembled and occasionally compelling in spite of itself, A Field In England showcases a singularly brilliant voice in British cinema". It has a score of 73/100 on Metacritic, based on reviews from 19 critics. Peter Bradshaw of The Guardian wrote that A Field in England was a "grisly and visceral" film that was "exposed to the elements, shivering with fever and discomfort". Bradshaw said that Wheatley has "cleverly alighted on the one period that suits his stripped-down visuals and subversive instincts perfectly". Jonathan Romney of The Independent wrote that the film was Wheatley's "most unclassifiable yet, blending historical drama, 1960s psychedelia and formal experimentation". He said, "Flawed as it is, A Field in England is some achievement, drumming up an earthly inferno out of next to nothing—dirt and wind, a patch of land, some blokes with scraggy beards. The result, in a minor-key fashion, is a blast—Apocalypse Now among the hedgerows."

Stephen Dalton, reviewing for The Hollywood Reporter, said, "A strikingly original historical thriller spiced with occult mysticism and mind-warping hallucinations, British director Ben Wheatley's fourth feature has all the midnight-movie intensity of a future cult classic." Dalton noted flaws in the film but said that despite them, "A Field in England is a rich, strange, hauntingly intense work from a highly original writer-director team." Peter Debruge of Variety called A Field in England "a defiantly unclassifiable cross-genre experiment ... that simultaneously reinvents and regurgitates low-budget British cinema as it goes". Debruge said of the director's approach, "Clearly, Wheatley is bored with the paint-by-numbers approach of his horror contemporaries, but has swung so far in the opposite direction here, the result feels almost amateurishly avant garde at times, guilty of the sort of indulgences one barely tolerates in student films."

=== Writing ===
The Guardian's Peter Bradshaw said A Field in England had "a more literary screenplay" than "the improv feel" of Wheatley's previous films. Bradshaw compared the writing to that of Dennis Potter and Edward Bond. He also found the British tone similar to the films Straw Dogs and Withnail and I. The Independent's Romney said, "The screenplay contains much juicy period dialogue, although the gist is often lost amid hectic cuts, drunken camera moves and the men's habit of grabbing each other by the throat." For Romney, "the sharpest moments of clarity" in the narrative came in the dialogue. The Hollywood Reporter's Dalton wrote, "One of the film's pleasures is its rich dialogue—a ripe blend of Shakespearean finery, salty swearing and lowbrow toilet humor." The trade paper noted, "Jump sets up some interesting tensions between Christian faith and Pagan witchcraft, science and sorcery, soldiers and scholars."

=== Cinematography ===
The Guardian wrote that "the monochrome images" were similar to those of the 1975 film Winstanley. The Independent said the photography had "furious visual panache and ... ominous, often abstract beauty". The Hollywood Reporter commended the "terrific" cinematography of "ravishing monochrome vistas punctuated by extreme close-ups of plants, animals, insects and tormented human faces". Variety wrote, "The commitment to monochrome brings out a beauty largely absent in previous collaborations with D.P. (director of photography) Laurie Rose, though his handheld style and axis-breaking setups often disorient—and not necessarily in ways that help the psychic imbalance the pic means to achieve."

=== Cast and characters ===
The Guardian wrote, "Smiley is a great O'Neil, scary and commanding, while Shearsmith's Whitehead is hilariously submissive." It added about Shearsmith's role, "His performance here is equal to and better than the 'gothic' characters he has created on television." Variety also commended Shearsmith's performance as leaving "the strongest impression". The trade paper expressed disappointment at a general lack of character development, "Although Wheatley and Jump have gotten away with eliminating exposition and traditional character detail in the past, it's frustratingly difficult to follow what this motley group is searching for, much less to distinguish between the various personalities."

=== Editing ===
Ben Wheatley and Amy Jump edited the film together. Variety said the editors "hypnotize the audience by cutting back and forth between shots of the various characters, folding and mirroring the images into disconcerting hallucinations". The Independent wrote that the editors' "big firework display" was that of a psychedelic experience, which was "a stroboscopic pandemonium of mirror images, flash cuts, bursts of light".

=== Music and sound ===
The Hollywood Reporter said, "Sound designer Martin Pavey and composer Jim Williams also deserve special mention for underpinning these ostensibly calm pastoral scenes with a constant undertow of clanging, churning menace." The Independent commended Pavey's work, "Everything floats unmoored, dialogue has the same sonic status as the wind or the eerie music."

== See also ==
- List of films featuring hallucinogens
- List of black-and-white films produced since 1966
