= Happy New Year, Colin Burstead =

2018 British comedy-drama film

- Promotional release poster
- Directed by: Ben Wheatley
- Written by: Ben Wheatley
- Produced by: Andy Starke
- Starring: Neil Maskell; Sarah Baxendale; Hayley Squires; Sam Riley; Doon Mackichan; Joe Cole; Charles Dance
- Cinematography: Laurie Rose
- Edited by: Ben Wheatley
- Music by: Clint Mansell
- Production companies: Rook Films; British Film Institute; Goal Post Film
- Distributed by: BBC Films; Goldcrest Films
- Release dates: 11 October 2018 (LFF); 30 December 2018 (United Kingdom)
- Running time: 95 minutes
- Country: United Kingdom
- Language: English

Happy New Year, Colin Burstead is a 2018 British comedy-drama film written and directed by Ben Wheatley and featuring Neil Maskell as the title character, with Sarah Baxendale, Hayley Squires, Sam Riley, Doon Mackichan, Joe Cole, and Charles Dance also starring. It tells the story of a man who rents a country house for his extended family to celebrate the New Year. The film premiered at the 62nd BFI London Film Festival on 11 October 2018, and was distributed by BBC Films, airing on BBC Two on 30 December 2018.

== Premise ==
Colin (Neil Maskell) rents a country house in Dorset for his extended family to celebrate the New Year. Unbeknownst to other members of the family, his sister Gini (Hayley Squires) has invited their estranged brother David (Sam Riley).

== Cast ==
- Sarah Baxendale as Paula
- Sudha Bhuchar as Maya
- Asim Chaudhry as Sham
- Joe Cole as Ed
- Charles Dance as Bertie
- Sura Dohnke as Val
- Vincent Ebrahim as Nikhil
- Peter Ferdinando as Jimmy
- Richard Glover as Lord Richard
- Alexandra Maria Lara as Hannah
- Doon Mackichan as Sandy
- Neil Maskell as Colin
- Sinead Matthews as Lainey
- Mark Monero as Warren
- Nicole Nettleingham as Fran
- Bill Paterson as Gordon
- Sam Riley as David
- Hayley Squires as Gini

== Production ==
The film is loosely based on Shakespeare's Coriolanus. After seeing Tom Hiddleston playing Coriolanus while casting High-Rise (2015), Ben Wheatley wrote the script. He reduced the plot to its bare bones and rebuilt it in a modern context. The film's working title was Colin You Anus. The film was shot in two weeks at the beginning of 2018. The filming took place at Pennsylvania Castle in Dorset. Clint Mansell wrote the score for the film.

== Release ==
On 11 October 2018, the film was screened at the 62nd BFI London Film Festival in competition. It aired on BBC2 on 30 December 2018. The film was also screened at the 2019 Palm Springs International Film Festival.

== Reception ==
On review aggregator website Rotten Tomatoes, the film holds an approval rating of 86% based on 28 reviews, and an average rating of 7.1/10.

Peter Bradshaw of The Guardian gave the film 3 stars out of 5, saying, "the performances are all great; they collectively create a directionless storm-cloud of disquiet." Stephen Dalton of The Hollywood Reporter wrote: "Featuring a large ensemble cast of mostly British faces, this dysfunctional family drama is a departure in tone but not in style, returning Wheatley to his lo-fi social-realist roots." Guy Lodge of Variety called it "one of his best, most fluid films." Ella Kemp of Sight & Sound wrote: "The film takes a while to warm up, but unforgiving writing gives it a deadpan backbone of brilliance."

Ben Wheatley was nominated for the Best Editing award at the British Independent Film Awards 2018.
