= Ellora Torchia =

British actress (born 1992)

- Born: Rashmika Ellora Torchia; April 1992 (age 34); London, England
- Education: Royal Academy of Dramatic Art (BA)
- Years active: 2010–present

Rashmika Ellora Torchia (born April 1992) is a British actress. For her role in the film In the Earth (2021), she was nominated for a British Independent Film Award. Her other films include Les Cowboys (2015), Midsommar (2019), and Ali & Ava (2021).

She was named a 2021 Screen International Star of Tomorrow and a BAFTA Breakthrough Brit.

== Early life and education ==
Torchia was born in Hammersmith, West London to South African-Indian mother Veena and Italian father Maurelio, who met in Switzerland. She has three sisters. The family lived in Sri Lanka, India, Turkey, Tunisia and Japan, before returning to London when Torchia was 13.

Torchia graduated from the Royal Academy of Dramatic Art (RADA) in 2014 with a Bachelor of Arts in Acting.

== Career ==
Torchia made her television debut in a 2010 episode of the BBC One spy drama Spooks (also known as MI-5). She appeared in a 2014 installment of The Suspicions of Mr Whicher as well as two 2015 episodes of DCI Banks, both on ITV.

In her final year at RADA, Torchia was cast as Sita in the first series of the Channel 4 drama Indian Summers, which premiered in 2015. She signed with an agent in Paris, through which she was cast in the French film Les Cowboys, marking her feature film debut. The following year, she played Vishka in the ITV fantasy series Beowulf: Return to the Shieldlands. She made her professional stage debut in Boys Will Be Boys at the Bush Theatre. This was followed by a role in The Treatment at the Almeida Theatre in 2017.

After guest starring in a series 3 episode of Broadchurch on ITV, Torchia had a recurring role as Maggie Lavelle in the first two series of the BBC One legal drama The Split. She also spent a year working at Shakespeare's Globe, appearing in All That Ends Well and The Two Noble Kinsmen. In 2019, she played Connie in Ari Aster's A24 folk horror film Midsommar.

Torchia starred in the 2021 science fiction horror film In the Earth, for which she was nominated for the British Independent Film Award for Breakthrough Performance. She also had roles in the films Ali & Ava and Crisis.

In 2022, Torchia starred as Reva in the Canal+ series Infiniti. In 2023, she played Sienna Rose in the BBC One miniseries The Gold. Torchia had joined the cast of the HBO fantasy series House of the Dragon for its second season and third season.

== Personal life ==
Torchia speaks English and French. She was raised vegan, and helps her parents run a business called the Arty Vegan.

== Filmography ==
=== Film ===
Year	Title	Role	Notes
2015	Les Cowboys	Shazhana	
2018	Our Happy Holiday	Tania	
2019	Midsommar	Connie	
2021	In the Earth	Alma	
2021	Crisis	Reeva	
2021	Ali & Ava	Runa	
2024	A Real Pain	Priya Kaplan	
2026	Cold Storage	Abigail	
2026	Our Share of Sand	Priti Mirani	

=== Television ===
Year	Title	Role	Notes
2010	Spooks	Aala Hall	1 episode
2014	The Suspicions of Mr Whicher	Miss Khan / Zeenat Jabour	Episode: "Beyond the Pale"
2015	DCI Banks	Nafeesah Kamel	2 episodes
2015	Indian Summers	Sita	9 episodes (series 1)
2016	Beowulf: Return to the Shieldlands	Vishka	12 episodes
2017	Broadchurch	Nira	1 episode
2018–2020	The Split	Maggie Lavelle	12 episodes (series 1–2)
2019	Dark Money	Dr Emily Watkins	Episode: "The Valiant One"
2021	The Nevers	Knitter	Episode: "True"
2021	On the Edge	Maia	Episode: "Cradled"
2022	Infiniti	Reva	6 episodes
2022	Grantchester	Maya	3 episodes (series 7)
2023	The Gold	Sienna Rose	5 episodes
2024–2026	House of the Dragon	Kat	Main role; 8 episodes
2025	Silent Witness	Claire Steadman	1 episode, 2 parts (series 28)

== Stage ==
Year	Title	Role	Notes
2016	Boys Will Be Boys	Priya Sengupta	Bush Theatre, London
2017	The Treatment	The Maid	Almeida Theatre, London
2018	All's Well That Ends Well	Helena	Shakespeare's Globe, London
2018	The Two Noble Kinsmen	Emilia	Shakespeare's Globe, London
2018	Votes for Women	Jean Dunbarton	National Theatre, London
2024	Look Back in Anger	Alison Porter	Almeida Theatre, London
2024	Roots	Pearl Bryant	Almeida Theatre, London

== Awards and nominations ==
Year	Award	Category	Work	Result	Ref.
2019	Ian Charleson Awards		The Two Noble Kinsmen	Nominated	
2021	British Independent Film Awards	Breakthrough Performance	In the Earth	Nominated	
