= Michael Smiley =

Northern Irish comedian and actor (born 1963)

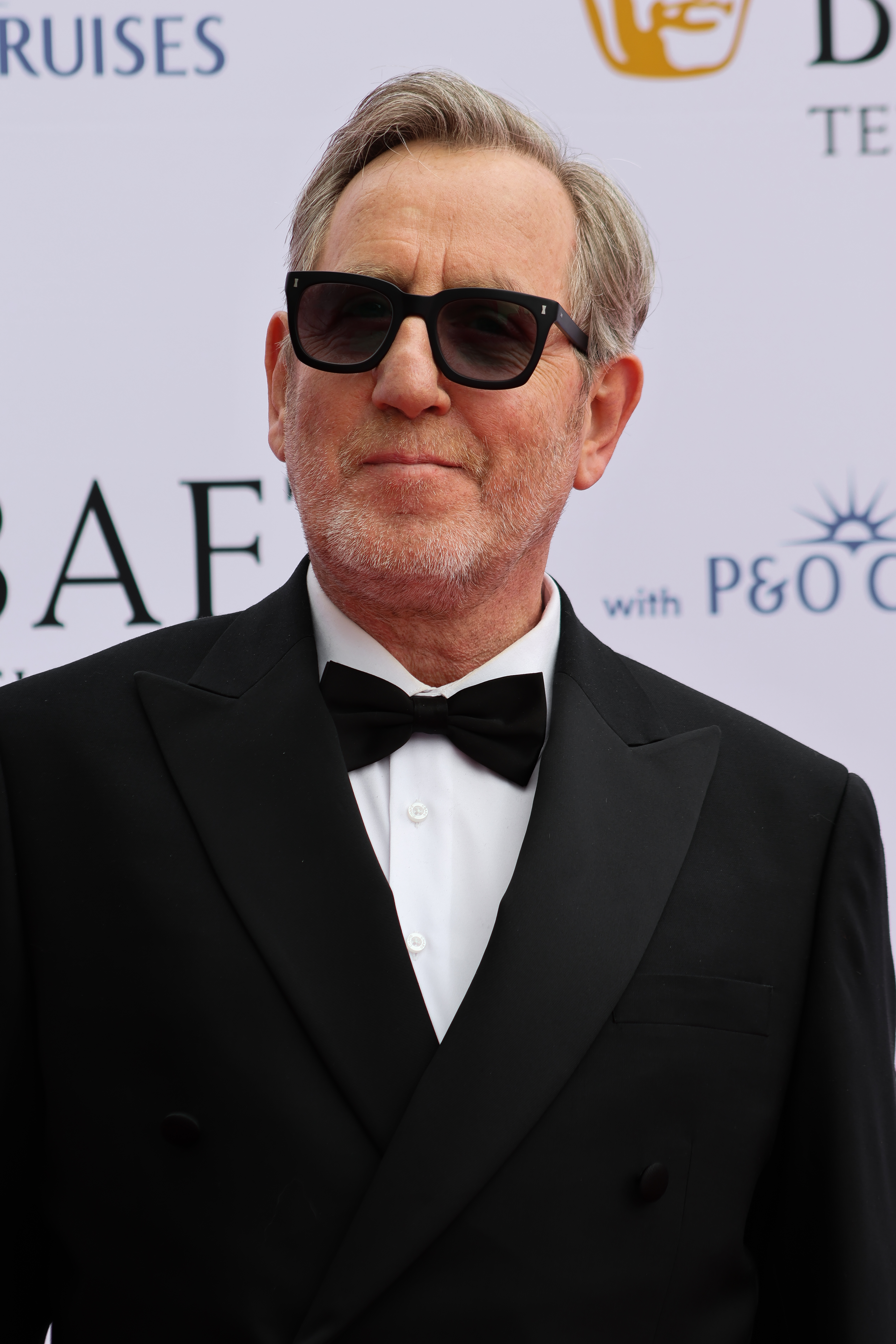
- Smiley at the 2026 British Academy Television Awards
- Born: 29 January 1963 (age 63); Belfast, Northern Ireland
- Occupations: Comedian, actor
- Spouse: Miranda Sawyer
- Children: 4

Michael Smiley (born 29 January 1963) is a Northern Irish comedian and actor. He is known for his roles in the films Kill List (2011) and The Lobster (2015). He has also made appearances in British television series such as Spaced, Luther, Utopia, Black Mirror and Doctor Who.

== Early life ==
Smiley was born on 29 January 1963 in Belfast and grew up in Holywood with an older brother and sister. He was raised Catholic.

He moved to London with his first wife in 1983. He began doing stand-up in 1993, after accepting a bet at an open-mic night. He had worked as a cycle courier, like his character in Spaced, and as an acid house DJ.

== Career ==
He became well known for his role as Tyres O'Flaherty, the bicycle riding raver, in two episodes of the Channel 4 sitcom Spaced, and for his appearances at the Edinburgh Fringe and the Melbourne Comedy Festival. He played Mac, a former member of the British Army's Parachute Regiment in the 2008 horror film Outpost and as a zombie in Shaun of the Dead.

In 2003, he guest starred in the Doctor Who audio drama Creatures of Beauty. In 2004, he appeared in season 2, episode 4 of Hustle as Max the forger. He also was a small character in episode 2 "The Model" of 15 Storeys High.

He has appeared in all three series of The Maltby Collection on Radio 4 as Des Wainwright, an eccentric security guard who keeps repeating himself and reminding people he was in the SAS. He plays the part of Benny "Deadhead" Silver in the BBC drama series Luther. In 2010, he had a major role in the film Burke & Hare alongside his Spaced co-stars Simon Pegg and Jessica Hynes.

In 2011, he starred in British horror film Kill List. The film received critical acclaim, and earned him the "Best Supporting Actor" Award at the 2011 British Independent Film Awards.

In 2013, he has appeared in an episode of BBC One's Ripper Street as George Lusk, and the critically acclaimed Channel 4 shows Utopia as Detective Reynolds and Black Mirror in the episode "White Bear" as Baxter. He also starred in A Field in England as the main antagonist, the alchemist O'Neill. He also played Roddy in Father Figure. In November 2013, he appeared in the third episode of the BBC Two Mitchell and Webb comedy Ambassadors as Mr Jackson. In 2014, he played Micky Murray in BBC Four's The Life of Rock with Brian Pern.

To coincide with the opening stages of the Giro d'Italia in May 2014, Michael Smiley: Something to Ride Home About was a travelog programme for BBC Northern Ireland, directed by George Kane, featuring Smiley cycling around Northern Ireland and meeting local people. A second series was commissioned for 2015.

In 2014, Smiley played Colonel Morgan Blue in the Doctor Who episode "Into the Dalek".

In 2019, Smiley co-starred with Elijah Wood and Martin Donovan in the film Come to Daddy directed by Ant Timpson.

In 2020, he starred in Dead Still, a six-part Irish-Canadian television drama series, alongside Eileen O'Higgins and Kerr Logan. The series is a co-production between Ireland's Deadpan Pictures and Canada's Shaftesbury Films and is written by John Morton, and directed by Imogen Murphy and Craig David Wallace.

In 2021, Smiley appeared in the lead role in The Toll, a Welsh black comedy film later released in the United States with the title Tollbooth.

In 2025, he appeared in Alien: Earth as the character "Shmuel". He also played Detective Chief Inspector Paul "Colly" Collins in series 3 and 4 of the BBC's TV series Blue Lights.

== Personal life ==
Smiley has been married twice and has four children: two with his first wife and childhood sweetheart Merilees, and two with his second wife, journalist/broadcaster Miranda Sawyer.

He shared a flat with Simon Pegg and Nick Frost in the 1990s. He is an avid cyclist.

== Filmography ==
=== Films ===
Year	Title	Role	Notes
2004	Shaun of the Dead	Zombie Tyres O’Flaherty	Uncredited
2006	Breaking and Entering	Thaddeus	Uncredited
2006	Perfume: The Story of a Murderer	Porter	
2006	Land of the Blind	Thorne's Lieutenant	
2008	Outpost	McKay	
2008	The Other Boleyn Girl	Physician	
2008	Terra Firma	Quentin	Short film
2009	Down Terrace	Pringle	
2009	Believe	Lewis	Short film
2010	Burke & Hare	Patterson	
2011	Kill List	Gal	
2011	Big Fat Gypsy Gangster	Mad Mick	
2012	Shell	Hugh	
2012	The ABCs of Death	Father Tom	Segment: ""U Is for Unearthed"
2013	For Those in Peril	Frank	
2013	A Field in England	O'Neil	
2013	Svengali	Irish Pierre	
2013	We Are the Freaks	Killer Colin	
2013	The World's End	Reverend Green	
2014	Glassland	Jim	
2014	Black Sea	Reynolds	
2015	The Hallow	Garda Davey	
2015	The Lobster	Loner Swimmer	
2015	Orthodox	Shannon	
2015	My Name is Emily	Robert	
2015	Tank 432	Capper	
2016	Free Fire	Frank	
2016	Rogue One: A Star Wars Story	Dr. Cornelius Evazan	
2017	Madame	David	
2017	Jawbone	Eddie	
2018	Birthmarked	Gertz	
2018	The Nun	Priest	
2019	Come to Daddy	Jethro	
2019	Rialto	Noel	
2021	Censor	Doug Smart	
2021	Gunpowder Milkshake	Dr. Ricky	
2021	The Toll	Toll Booth	
2022	The Silent Twins	Tim Thomas	
2024	Bookworm	Arnold	
TBA	The Riders	TBA	Filming

=== Television ===
Year	Title	Role	Notes
1989	The Heist	Detective	Television film; uncredited
1999–2001	Spaced	Tyres O'Flaherty	2 episodes
2000	Burnside	Matthew Hutchins	Episode: "Back with a Vengeance: Part 1"
2000–2002	Time Gentlemen Please	Martin	3 episodes
2002	15 Storeys High	Insistent Irish visitor	Episode: "The Model"
2004	Murder Prevention	DC Maurice Gibney	4 episodes
2005	Bleak House	Phil Squod	8 episodes
2005	Hustle	Max	Episode: "Missions"
2005	ShakespeaRe-Told	Peter	Episode: "Much Ado About Nothing"
2005	Rose and Maloney	DS Mallam	Episode: "Rise & Fall"
2007	In the Spider's Web	Phil	Television film
2007	Y Pris	Captain	Episode: "Episode #1.3"
2007	Nearly Famous	Danny	Episode: "Episode #1.5"
2008	The Wrong Door		2 episodes
2008	HolbyBlue	Brendan Duffy	Episode: "Episode #2.10"
2008	Wire in the Blood	Dr. Liam Kerwin	7 episodes
2009	Law & Order: UK	Danny Doyle	Episode: "Unsafe"
2010	One Night in Emergency	Mortuary Attendant	Television film
2010–2019	Luther	Benny Silver	16 episodes
2011	Stolen	Sean	Television film
2012	Coming Up	Ricky	Episode: "Spoof or Die"
2012	Good Cop	Tom Lomax	Episode: "Episode Two"
2012	New Tricks	Tinker	Episode: "Part of a Whole"
2013	Ripper Street	George Lusk	Episode: "In My Protection"
2013	Utopia	Detective Reynolds	Episode: "Episode 1"
2013	Black Mirror	Baxter	Episode: "White Bear"
2013	Father Figure	Roddy	6 episodes
2013	Ambassadors	Mr Jackson	Episode: "The Tazbek Spring"
2013–2014	Monumental	Self	
2014	The Life of Rock with Brian Pern	Micky Murray	2 episodes
2014	Doctor Who	Colonel Morgan Blue	Episode: "Into the Dalek"
2014	Edge of Heaven	Snowy	2 episodes
2014–2015	Michael Smiley: Something to Ride Home About	Self	
2015	Comedy Feeds	Les	Episode: "Fishbowl"
2016	The Aliens	Antoine Berry	5 episodes
2016	Murder	Whitmore Harris	Episode: "The Big Bang"
2020	Dead Still	Brock Blennerhasset	Series lead
2021	Bloodlands	Dinger	4 episodes
2021	Intergalactic	Professor Hague Blake	Episode 1.4
2022	The Curse		2 episodes
2022	Ragdoll	DS Finlay	6 episodes
2022–2024	Bad Sisters	Roger Muldoon	13 episodes
2023	Obituary	Ward Clancy	6 episodes
2024	Generation Z	Wrollen	6 episodes
2025	Alien: Earth	Shmuel	2 episodes
2025-2026	Blue Lights	Paul "Colly" Collins	12 episodes

=== Radio ===
Year	Title	Role	Notes
2007	Eye Witness		BBC Radio 3
2007–2009	The Maltby Collection	Des Wainwright	BBC Radio 4
