= Ben Wheatley =

English film and TV director (born 1972)

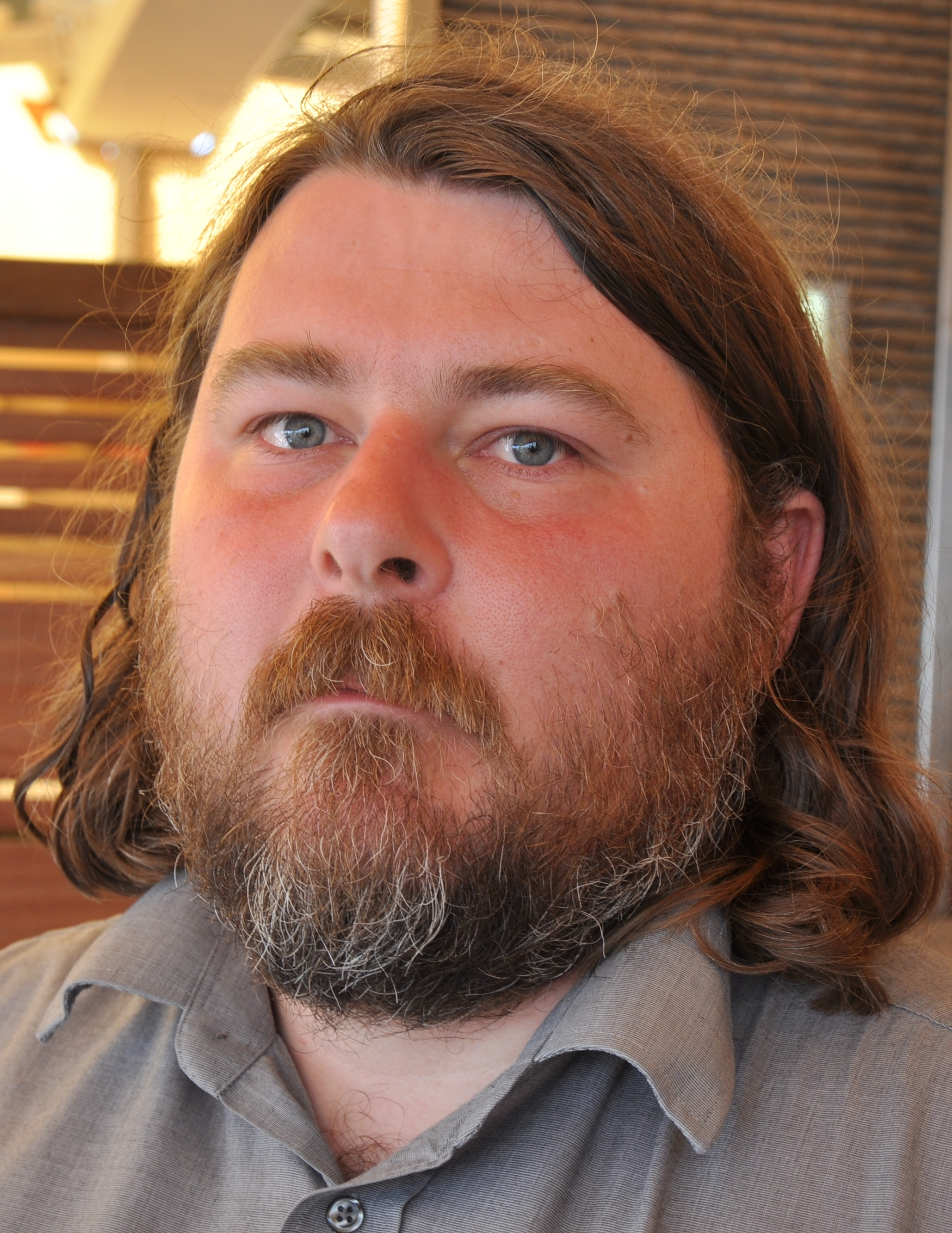
- Wheatley in 2012
- Born: 1972 (age 53–54); Billericay, Essex, England
- Occupations: Film director, screenwriter, film editor, film producer, animator
- Notable work: Kill List; Sightseers; A Field in England; High-Rise; Free Fire; Meg 2: The Trench
- Spouse: Amy Jump
- Children: 1

Ben Wheatley (born 1972) is an English filmmaker, film editor, and animator. Beginning his career in advertising, Wheatley first gained recognition and acclaim for his commercials and short films, before transitioning into feature films and television programmes. He is best known for his work in the thriller and horror genres, with his films frequently incorporating heavy elements of black comedy and satire.

Wheatley has received numerous accolades for his work, including an Evening Standard British Film Award, five British Independent Film Award nominations, and numerous awards and honours from film festivals including South by Southwest, Karlovy Vary, Mar del Plata, Raindance, Toronto and Cannes.

== Career ==
In 2006, Wheatley won a "Lion" award at Cannes advertising festival for directing the AMBX viral, with The Viral Factory. In July 2006 he directed live-action sections of the TV series Modern Toss ("i live ere", "Alan", "Drive by abuser", "Customer services", "Accident and emergency", "Citizens advice", "Illegal alphabet"), which was aired on Channel 4. Wheatley has also written and created clips for BBC Two's Time Trumpet, and has appeared in and directed sketches for BBC Three's Comedy Shuffle. Between 2007 and 2009 Wheatley directed series two of Modern Toss and Ideal series five and six. In 2008, Wheatley co-created and directed the sketch series The Wrong Door for BBC Three.

In May 2009, he directed the feature film Down Terrace in eight days; it won the Next Wave prize at Fantastic Fest in Austin and Best UK Feature at Raindance in London. In 2010 Wheatley completed his second feature, Kill List for Warp X. The film received critical acclaim and won Michael Smiley a British Independent Film Award for Best Supporting Actor. The movie holds a 76% rating on Rotten Tomatoes with a critic consensus describing the film as "an expertly executed slow-burn crime thriller that thrives on tension before morphing into visceral horror."

Wheatley's third film was the black comedy Sightseers, released in the UK in November 2012. It was written by its stars, Alice Lowe and Steve Oram, with additional material by Amy Jump, and was chosen for the Directors' Fortnight section of the 2012 Cannes Film Festival. Wheatley's fourth film, A Field in England was financed through the Film4 talent and ideas hub, Film4.0. It was followed in 2015 by High-Rise, an adaptation of the J. G. Ballard novel of the same name. He has also directed advertisements for Blink Productions and Moxie.

Wheatley wrote and directed Free Fire (2016), starring an ensemble cast including Cillian Murphy, Brie Larson, Armie Hammer and Sharlto Copley. His film Happy New Year, Colin Burstead was made for the BBC 2018 Christmas schedule, and remains available to watch on iPlayer.

In November 2018 Wheatley was hired to direct an adaptation of Daphne du Maurier's gothic romance novel Rebecca, a Working Title Films production. Released on Netflix in October 2020, the film stars Lily James, Armie Hammer, and Kristin Scott Thomas. It received mixed reviews, with a score of 46 on review aggregator site Metacritic.

In autumn 2019, Wheatley was announced as the director of the sequel for Tomb Raider, based on the popular video-game franchise of the same name and starring Academy Award-winning actress Alicia Vikander as Lara Croft, with Amy Jump to pen the script. However, in October 2020 it was announced that the film's March 2021 release had been delayed indefinitely, amid a series of production issues related to the COVID-19 pandemic. In January 2021, Wheatley was replaced by Lovecraft Country creator Misha Green, and the script was rewritten. The film was eventually scrapped.

In November 2020, it was announced that Wheatley had wrapped production on In the Earth, a pandemic-set horror film starring Joel Fry, Ellora Torchia, Hayley Squires and Reece Shearsmith. Neon released the film in the U.S. in 2021.

In October 2020, it was announced that Wheatley would take over the sequel to the science-fiction horror film The Meg, starring Jason Statham and Li Bingbing, based on Steve Alten's eponymous series of novels. Alten confirmed the sequel would be an adaptation of the second book of the series, The Trench.

== Personal life ==
Wheatley was born in Billericay, Essex, England. He went to Haverstock School in North London.

== Filmography ==
=== Film ===
Feature film

Year	Title	Director	Writer	Editor	Notes
2009	Down Terrace	Yes	Yes	Yes	Also executive producer
2011	Kill List	Yes	Yes	Yes	
2012	Sightseers	Yes	No	Yes	
2014	A Field in England	Yes	No	Yes	
2015	High-Rise	Yes	No	Yes	
2016	Free Fire	Yes	Yes	Yes	
2018	Happy New Year, Colin Burstead	Yes	Yes	Yes	
2020	Rebecca	Yes	No	No	
2021	In the Earth	Yes	Yes	Yes	Also executive producer
2023	Meg 2: The Trench	Yes	No	No	
2025	Bulk	Yes	Yes	Yes	
2025	Normal	Yes	No	No	

Short film

Year	Title	Notes
2006	Rob Loves Kerry	
2012	U Is for Unearthed	Segment of The ABCs of Death; Also editor
2016	LostDogFilm	Executive producer

Executive producer

- The Duke of Burgundy (2014)
- ABCs of Death 2 (2014)
- Aaaaaaaah! (2015)
- Tank 432 (2015)
- The Greasy Strangler (2016)
- The Ghoul (2016)
- In Fabric (2018)
- Klokkenluider (2022)

=== Television ===
Year	Title			
Year	Title	Director	Writer	Notes
2006	Time Trumpet	No	Yes	4 episodes
2007	Comedy: Shuffle	Yes	Yes	1 episode
2008	Modern Toss	Yes	No	12 episodes
2008	The Wrong Door	Yes	Yes	6 episodes
2009	Steve Coogan: The Inside Story	Yes	No	Television special Co-directed with Dave Walker
2009–2010	Ideal	Yes	No	14 episodes
2012	Burge & Way	Yes	No	Television film
2014	Doctor Who	Yes	No	Episodes "Deep Breath" and "Into the Dalek"
2018–2019	Strange Angel	Yes	No	3 episodes
2024	Generation Z	Yes	Yes	6 episodes Also executive producer

=== Music video ===
- "Formaldehyde" by Editors (2013)
- "Mork n Mindy" by Sleaford Mods (2020)

== Awards and nominations ==
Year	Title	Award
2009	Down Terrace	Fantastic Fest Next Award for Best Film; Raindance Jury Prize for Best UK Feature; Nominated- Evening Standard British Film Award for Best Screenplay
2011	Kill List	Nominated- British Independent Film Award for Best Director; Nominated- British Independent Film Award for Best Screenplay; Nominated- BiFan Best of Bucheon; Nominated- Evening Standard British Film Award for Best Screenplay; Nominated- Fangoria Chainsaw Award for Best Screenplay; Nominated- SXSW Audience Award for Midnight Feature
2012	Sightseers	Evening Standard Peter Sellers Award for Comedy; BiFan Best of Bucheon; Nominated- British Independent Film Award for Best Director; Nominated- Mar del Plata International Award for Best Film; Nominated- Sitges Maria Award for Best Motion Picture; Nominated- Variety Piazza Grande Award
2012	The ABCs of Death	Nominated- Golden Chicago Hugo (After Dark Competition)
2013	A Field in England	Karlovy Vary Special Prize of the Jury; Nominated- Crystal Globe; Nominated- Dublin Film Critics' Circle Award for Best Director; Nominated- Sitges Maria Award for Best Motion Picture
2015	High-Rise	TIFF Platform Prize
2016	Free Fire	TIFF People's Choice Award; Nominated- British Independent Film Award for Best Director; Nominated- Mar del Plata International Award for Best Film; Nominated- Rotterdam MovieZone Award; Nominated- Golden San Sebastián Seashell
2018	Happy New Year, Colin Burstead	Nominated- British Independent Film Award for Best Editing; Nominated- BFI London Best Film Award
2023	Meg 2: The Trench	Nominated- Golden Raspberry Award for Worst Director
