= Down Terrace =

2009 film by Ben Wheatley

- Film poster
- Directed by: Ben Wheatley
- Written by: Ben Wheatley; Robin Hill
- Produced by: Andrew Starke
- Starring: Robin Hill; Robert Hill; Julia Deakin
- Cinematography: Laurie Rose
- Edited by: Ben Wheatley; Robin Hill
- Music by: Jim Williams
- Production companies: Mondo Macabro Movies; Baby Cow Productions
- Distributed by: Metrodome Distribution
- Release date: 21 September 2009
- Running time: 93 minutes
- Country: United Kingdom
- Language: English
- Budget: £6,000
- Box office: $9,812

Down Terrace is a 2009 British crime film directed, co-written, co-edited by Ben Wheatley and starring Robin Hill, Robert Hill and Julia Deakin.

== Plot ==
Upon release from prison, Bill and his son Karl arrive home at Down Terrace in Brighton. With the help of his wife Maggie, Bill decides to find the rat in his criminal organisation and a tale of recrimination, betrayal and murder ensues.

Meanwhile, Karl grows increasingly edgy and uncomfortable with his dysfunctional family. When Karl's girlfriend Valda shows up visibly pregnant, he hosts a dinner for her to meet his parents that does not end well. Karl announces that they plan to get married, but his parents disapprove and demand that he get a paternity test.

Bill's employee Garvey tells Karl that Valda dated Garvey's brother for a while recently, which enrages Karl; Karl murders Garvey and enlists his uncle Eric's help in secretly burying the body. Worried about Garvey's unexplained disappearance and that a hitman, Pringle, might talk about a previous attempt on Garvey's life, Bill orders Eric to murder Pringle and his mother, leaving his three-year-old son fatherless.

The carnage attracts Jony, a London gangster, who tells Bill that the lack of subtlety and stability has put Karl and his family at risk; Maggie promises to rein in Bill. Eric himself is poisoned by Maggie because she doubts his loyalty to the family's criminal organisation. Karl, who suspects that his parents have murdered Eric, accuses them of making deals with the police after he hears a death-bed confession from Berman, their lawyer. Eventually, Valda talks Karl into murdering his parents: Karl shoots his father to death, and Valda lures his mother to an isolated farm and stabs her to death.

== Cast ==
- Robin Hill as Karl
- Robert Hill as Bill
- Julia Deakin as Maggie
- David Schaal as Eric
- Kerry Peacock as Valda
- Tony Way as Garvey
- Mark Kempner as Berman
- Michael Smiley as Pringle
- Gareth Tunley as Jon
- Kali Peacock as Helen Garvey

== Release ==
Down Terrace premiered at the 2009 Fantastic Fest. It was released on DVD on 17 May 2011.

== Reception ==
Rotten Tomatoes, a review aggregator, reports that 86% of 37 surveyed critics gave the film a positive review; the average rating is 6.8/10. Metacritic rated it 68/100. Stephen Holden of The New York Times called it a "grimly amusing" and "persuasively acted" film that "has too many narrative gaps for its pieces to cohere satisfactorily." Anthony Quinn of The Independent rated it 4/5 stars and called it a "genuinely different" gangster film that shows great promise for Wheatley. Robert Bell of Exclaim! called it "an anomalous and consistently hilarious, if flawed, comedy of idiosyncrasy and misanthropy." David Parkinson of Empire rated it 3/5 stars and called it a "bleakly hilarious reclamation of the British crime genre from peddlers of mockney muppetry." Philip French of The Guardian called it a "highly entertaining, low-budget black comedy". Michael Rechtshaffen of The Hollywood Reporter wrote, "There's a deadpan streak of larceny coursing through the corroded pipes of Down Terrace, a darkly comedic approach to the British working-class social realism inhabited by Ken Loach and Mike Leigh." Ronnie Sheib of Variety wrote, "Cleverly channeling gangster tropes through a British kitchen-sink soap opera, TV scribe-helmer Ben Wheatley has concocted a nifty black comedy, with a little help from his friends, in Down Terrace." Kevin Thomas of the Los Angeles Times called it a "distinctive and idiosyncratic" film that "is long on talk but generates its own internal rhythms and pace that makes it feel bracing and vibrantly alive." Lisa Schwarzbaum of Entertainment Weekly rated the film A− and called it "a dark and hilarious thwomping of the whole miserablist British gangster genre." Jason Anderson of the Toronto Star called it "an enjoyably nasty piece of business" that is "both horrific and hilarious".

=== Awards and recognition ===
Down Terrace won the Raindance Award at the British Independent Film Awards 2009 and the Next Wave Awards for Best Feature and Best Screenplay at Fantastic Fest 2009. Wheatley won Most Promising Newcomer at the Evening Standard British Film Awards in 2010.
