= High-Rise (film) =

2015 film by Ben Wheatley

- Theatrical release poster
- Directed by: Ben Wheatley
- Screenplay by: Amy Jump
- Based on: High-Rise by J. G. Ballard
- Produced by: Jeremy Thomas
- Starring: Tom Hiddleston; Jeremy Irons; Sienna Miller; Luke Evans; Elisabeth Moss
- Cinematography: Laurie Rose
- Edited by: Amy Jump; Ben Wheatley
- Music by: Clint Mansell
- Production companies: Recorded Picture Company; HanWay Films; Film4; BFI; Northern Ireland Screen; Ingenious Media; Scope Pictures; S Films
- Distributed by: StudioCanal
- Release dates: 13 September 2015 (TIFF); 18 March 2016 (United Kingdom)
- Running time: 119 minutes
- Country: United Kingdom
- Language: English
- Budget: £6.1 million (approximately US$8 million)
- Box office: $4.1 million

High-Rise is a 2015 British dystopian psychological thriller film directed by Ben Wheatley from a screenplay by Amy Jump, based on the 1975 novel of the same name by J. G. Ballard. The film stars Tom Hiddleston, Jeremy Irons, Sienna Miller, Luke Evans, and Elisabeth Moss.

The film is set in a luxury tower block in 1975. Featuring a wealth of modern conveniences, the building allows its residents to become gradually uninterested in the outside world. The infrastructure begins to fail and tensions between residents become apparent, and the building soon descends into chaos.

In September 2015, the film received its world première at the Toronto International Film Festival and its European première at the 63rd San Sebastián Film Festival. The film was released in the United Kingdom on 18 March 2016 by StudioCanal. Though a modest critical success, the film's theatrical box office failed to meet its production costs. In 2017 it was nominated for the Empire Award for Best British Film.

== Plot ==
In September 1975, Dr. Robert Laing lives in a ravaged high-rise tower block, killing a dog and spit-roasting its leg.

Three months earlier, the 40-storey tower on the outskirts of London, built by esteemed architect Anthony Royal, is the epitome of chic, modern living. Wealthy residents live on the top floors, and poorer residents live below. With amenities including a pool, gym, spa, supermarket and primary school, the occupants have little reason to leave the building beyond working hours and become increasingly isolated from the outside world. Laing, who moves onto the 25th floor after his sister dies, begins a sexual relationship with single mother Charlotte Melville and becomes a father figure to her son, Toby. Laing also befriends documentary filmmaker Richard Wilder and his pregnant wife Helen, who live in a low-level apartment with their children. While Laing leads a physiology class in examining a severed head, a student named Munrow faints and is given a precautionary brain scan. The next day, Laing is taken to the 40th-storey penthouse to meet Royal, who invites him to a party thrown by his snobby wife, Ann.

The gathering turns out to be an 18th-century costume party where Laing's everyday suit is ridiculed by Ann and other guests, including Munrow, who also lives in the building. Humiliated, Laing is thrown out of the party and becomes trapped in a lift during a power cut. Such power cuts are becoming common, along with water being shut off and garbage chutes becoming blocked, to the annoyance of residents. Royal tells Laing these are simply growing pains of a new building. Munrow's brain scans come back clean, but a vengeful Laing leads him to believe he has a brain tumour. Another power cut ignites a night of decadent partying throughout the high-rise, and a drunk Munrow commits suicide by jumping off the 39th floor. Suspicious that no police arrive to investigate, Wilder becomes intent on exposing the injustices within the high-rise. Law and order in the building disintegrate as violence and debauchery become commonplace, garbage piles up, food becomes scarce, and class warfare erupts between floors. Laing shows signs of mental disturbance, savagely beating a man, barricading himself in his apartment, and having sex with Helen.

Wilder, having been beaten by upper-floor residents, decides to kill Royal, believing him responsible for the chaos. It is implied that Royal has bribed authorities to ignore the disorder. Acquiring a gun from the Royals' former housekeeper, Wilder learns that Toby is Royal's illegitimate child. Breaking into Charlotte's apartment, Wilder tortures and rapes her for information on Royal. A television newsreader named Cosgrove, the only upper-floor resident who still leaves for work, is killed by a gang of lower-floor residents. Some upper-floor residents butcher Ann's horse for meat and ask Laing to lobotomise Wilder as a dangerous agitator. After conducting a psychiatric examination, Laing refuses, stating that Wilder is "possibly the sanest man in the building". Laing is nearly thrown off the tower, but Royal intervenes. He surmises to Laing that the failure of the high-rise may actually be a kind of success, a "crucible for change" that could lead residents to escape to a new life. Helen gives birth to her overdue baby. Wilder makes his way to the penthouse, and after a confrontation with Royal, shoots him dead. Wilder is then stabbed to death by Royal's women, as Toby looks on through his kaleidoscope.

The film ends as it began in the ravaged high-rise. Violence has abated somewhat since many residents are dead or have fled. Laing appears to have gone insane, speaking about himself and to others in the third person. He lies down with Charlotte, reflecting that what has happened will eventually occur in the second tower of the development. The film concludes with Toby listening to a radio broadcast of Margaret Thatcher declaring that "where there is state capitalism there can never be political freedom."

== Cast ==
- Tom Hiddleston as Robert Laing
- Jeremy Irons as Anthony Royal
- Sienna Miller as Charlotte Melville
- Luke Evans as Richard Wilder
- Elisabeth Moss as Helen Wilder
- James Purefoy as Pangbourne
- Keeley Hawes as Ann Royal
- Peter Ferdinando as Cosgrove
- Sienna Guillory as Jane
- Reece Shearsmith as Steele
- Enzo Cilenti as Adrian Talbot
- Augustus Prew as Munrow
- Dan Skinner as Simmons
- Stacy Martin as Fay
- Tony Way as Robert the Caretaker
- Leila Mimmack as Laura
- Bill Paterson as Mercer
- Victoria Wicks as Miriam
- Emilia Jones as Vicky
- Maggie Cronin as Mrs Munrow

== Production ==
=== Development ===
British producer Jeremy Thomas had wanted to make a film adaptation of J. G. Ballard's High-Rise since the 1970s. He tried to make it in the late 1970s with Nicolas Roeg directing from a script by Paul Mayersberg. In the 2000s, Thomas began developing the project with screenwriter Richard Stanley and director Vincenzo Natali, with the film intended as a loose adaptation of the novel.

In 2013, Wheatley started looking into who held the rights to the book, which led him to Thomas. Wheatley has remarked: "The book makes as much sense now as it did then. It was written in the '70s, projecting itself into a near future, but we live in that future now. We're almost in a new version of the '70s."

Screenwriter Amy Jump, who is also Wheatley's wife, adapted the book.

Hiddleston's involvement in the project was announced in February 2014 after he was cast in the role of Dr Robert Laing. Hiddleston had previously worked with Thomas on Jim Jarmusch's 2013 film Only Lovers Left Alive. The involvement of Luke Evans and Elisabeth Moss was announced that June.

Clint Mansell composed the soundtrack for the film.

International sales were handled by HanWay Films, and key financiers included the British Film Institute and FilmFour.

=== Filming ===
Principal photography began in July 2014 in Belfast, primarily in the seaside resort town of Bangor, County Down.

On 3 July 2014, Wheatley tweeted pictures of the set. On 6 August 2014, Hiddleston tweeted a photograph of himself from the set seen in character as Laing, together with Wheatley, Evans and director of photography Laurie Rose.

Elisabeth Moss later remarked on Wheatley and the shoot: "I don't know anyone who makes movies like he does... (it was) like if you gave him a bigger crew, a little bit more money, costumes and hair and makeup, all of that stuff that maybe he hasn't had before. It was so fun, he is just a fucking genius and he's so funny."

== Release ==
Prior to production on the film, it was announced that StudioCanal and The Jokers would be distributing the film in the United Kingdom and France, respectively. In August 2015, it was announced that Soda Pictures would distribute the film in Canada. The film had its world première at the Toronto International Film Festival on 13 September 2015. It had its international premiere at the San Sebastian Film Festival on 21 September 2015. The film went onto screen at the London Film Festival on 9 October 2015, and the Torino Film Festival on 22 November 2015. Shortly after, it was announced Magnet Releasing had acquired the US distribution rights to the film. The film was released on 18 March 2016 in the United Kingdom. The film was released in the United States on 28 April 2016, with a day and date video on demand and theatrical limited release on 13 May 2016.

The film failed to recoup its production costs.

== Critical response ==
Tim Robey of The Telegraph awarded High-Rise 4 out of 5 stars, praising the brutality and dark comedy. IGN awarded it a score of 7.0 out of 10, saying "Enjoyably dark and disturbing adaptation of one of J.G. Ballard's best." Kate Wilson of Varsity gave the film a 5-star review, calling it a "masterpiece." In a review for Architects' Journal, Laura Mark was impressed by the "fantastic" visuals but noted that it lacked plot. Mark also stated that the dystopia portrayed reflected current concerns regarding gentrification and division. Others have noted the film's nostalgia for 1970s aesthetics.

On Rotten Tomatoes, it has an approval rating of 60% based on 223 reviews, with an average rating of 6.4/10. The site's critics consensus reads: "High-Rise may not quite live up to its classic source material, but it still offers an energetic, well-acted, and thought-provoking take on its timely socioeconomic themes." On Metacritic, the film has a score of 65 out of 100 based on reviews from 36 critics, indicating "generally favorable reviews".

== Accolades ==
Award	Date of ceremony	Category	Recipients	Result
British Independent Film Awards	6 December 2015	Best Actor	Tom Hiddleston	Nominated
British Independent Film Awards	6 December 2015	Best Supporting Actress	Sienna Miller	Nominated
British Independent Film Awards	6 December 2015	Best Supporting Actor	Luke Evans	Nominated
British Independent Film Awards	6 December 2015	Best Screenplay	Amy Jump	Nominated
London Film Critics' Circle Awards	22 January 2017	British/Irish film of the Year	High-Rise	Nominated
British Film Designers Guild Awards	28 January 2017	Best Production Design for an Independent Feature Film	Mark Tildesley, Frank Walsh, and Paki Smith	Won
European Composer and Songwriter Alliance Grand Scores Award	2 February 2017	Best Orchestral Score	Clint Mansell	Won
Empire Awards	19 March 2017	Best British Film	High-Rise	Nominated
Diversity in Media Awards	15 September 2017	Movie of the Year	High-Rise	Nominated

== See also ==
- Snowpiercer – a 2013 film with a similar plot of class conflict in an allegorical society.
