= StudioCanal UK =

British film distributor

StudioCanal Limited
- Logo used since 2011
- Formerly: Tidalgate 2000 Limited (1998–1999); Optimum Releasing Limited (1999–2011)
- Type: Subsidiary
- Industry: Film distributor
- Predecessor: Canal+ Image
- Founded: 9 October 1998; 28 years ago (as Tidalgate 2000 Limited)
- Headquarters: London, England
- Products: Feature films
- Parent: StudioCanal (2006–present)
- Subsidiaries: Elevation Sales (joint venture with Lionsgate UK); Paddington and Company
- Website: studiocanal.co.uk

StudioCanal Limited, trading as StudioCanal UK (formerly known as Optimum Releasing), is a British film and television production and distribution subsidiary and the official British branch of the French entertainment giant company StudioCanal part of Canal+ Group. The company produces and releases many films and shows in the UK, including independent and arthouse; British, foreign, anime and Studio Ghibli (until 2022).

== History ==
=== Optimum Releasing (1999–2011) ===
The company was founded in October 1998, and began operation as Optimum Releasing in May 1999. The company, at the time, was exclusively a theatrical distributor, holding distribution of new releases and UK rights to the back catalogues of other companies. Optimum's first theatrical release was a restored version of The Third Man, licensed from Le Studio Canal+, and was released in July of that year, on the same weekend as the anticipated UK release of Star Wars: Episode I – The Phantom Menace.

The company launched a Home Entertainment division in 2004, and released material under several banners:

- Optimum Home Entertainment (Used for mainstream DVD and Blu-ray releases)
- Optimum Classic (Used for re-releases of back catalogue films)
- Optimum World (Used for world cinema releases)
- Optimum Asia (Used for Asian & Anime releases)

Optimum released over two hundred films a year and were one of the most prominent distributors in the independent film and world cinema market in the United Kingdom since the closure of Tartan Films in June 2008. In May 2006, Optimum Releasing was acquired by French film producer and distributor StudioCanal, a subsidiary of Vivendi's Canal+ Group, for £22–25 million, marking a re-entry into an international market for StudioCanal. Since then, StudioCanal started to release films from their back catalogue (including those from the Carolco Pictures and EMI Films libraries) through Optimum Releasing under the Optimum Classic banner.

Some of the last titles released under the Optimum Releasing name include Kill List, The Guard, Larry Crowne and a re release of Whisky Galore!.

=== StudioCanal UK (2011–present) ===
In September 2011, Optimum Releasing was rebranded under the StudioCanal name. Tinker Tailor Soldier Spy, Tyrannosaur, Don't Be Afraid of the Dark, The Awakening, and W.E. were among the first films released under the new name. Under the Optimum Releasing name the company was entirely focused on film distribution, but after being rebranded into StudioCanal UK the company began film and television productions allowing English Language films to be produced by StudioCanal for British audiences.

In December 2022, the company sued Wild Bunch International over their British/Irish Studio Ghibli contract, certifying that Wild Bunch International's deal with Netflix for the Ghibli catalogue breached an agreement over standalone streaming rights where Wild Bunch claimed that "non-internet" streaming platforms "don't exist". WBI counter-sued StudioCanal UK, where they citified that their distribution deal was recouping distribution expenses against all forms of distribution, and not theatrical as they originally claimed. In 2023 with the release of The Boy and the Heron, Elysian Film Group officially took over as Ghibli's distributor in the United Kingdom and Ireland until it was turned over to GKIDS and Anime Limited in 2026.

In 2023, after Pathé exited the UK theatrical film market, StudioCanal UK acquired the distribution rights to most of their catalog.
