= Kill List =

2011 film directed by Ben Wheatley

- Theatrical release poster
- Directed by: Ben Wheatley
- Written by: Ben Wheatley; Amy Jump
- Produced by: Claire Jones; Andy Starke
- Starring: Neil Maskell; MyAnna Buring; Michael Smiley
- Cinematography: Laurie Rose
- Edited by: Robin Hill; Ben Wheatley; Amy Jump
- Music by: Jim Williams
- Production companies: Warp X; Rook Films; Film4 Productions; UK Film Council; Screen Yorkshire
- Distributed by: Optimum Releasing
- Release date: 12 March 2011 (SXSW)
- Running time: 95 minutes
- Country: United Kingdom
- Language: English
- Budget: $800,000
- Box office: $462,206

Kill List is a 2011 British psychological horror crime film directed by Ben Wheatley, co-written and co-edited with Amy Jump, and starring Neil Maskell, MyAnna Buring and Michael Smiley. In the film, a British soldier joins an old friend in working as contract killers. His disturbed past surfaces as he spins out of control during jobs and ominous employers raise the stakes.

== Plot ==
Jay and Gal are two former British soldiers turned hitmen. While Gal is laid-back, Jay is still reeling from a disastrous mission in Kyiv. Despite his wife Shel's urgings, Jay has not obtained full employment, to the point where they are financially broke.

Shel organizes a dinner party, which was joined by Gal and his girlfriend Fiona, a human resources manager. During the party, Gal reveals he has a new job for them, which Jay eventually accepts. Meanwhile, Fiona goes to the toilet, carves a symbol on the back of the bathroom mirror, and collects a tissue with Jay's blood. Jay and Gal meet the client, who has a list of three people he wants killed. The employer unexpectedly cuts Jay's hand and his own, so that the contract is effectively signed in blood.

Their first target, captioned as "The Priest", recognizes Jay and thanks him just before being killed. The second name on the list, "The Librarian", is an archivist who keeps a collection of horrific, sickening videos of an undisclosed nature (Note: It is strongly implied that they are hurtcore snuff films; while the sample video itself is not shown, the high-pitched wailing of children can be heard and Gal tries to stifle Jay's curiosity by saying "you don't want to fucking look at that boy, I'll tell you". Furthermore, Gal calls the archivist and his associates "murdering perverts".). Jay is deeply disturbed by the videos and breaks down in tears. As the duo enter the archivist's home, an enraged Jay beats him senseless and tortures him into identifying the videos' creators. As Gal goes to raid the safe, the archivist thanks Jay, who proceeds to savagely beat him to death with a hammer. In the archivist's files, Gal finds a folder on himself and Jay, including details of their Kyiv mission. Although they do not recognize it, the files include the symbol that Fiona carved in Jay's mirror.

Jay insists they kill the archivist's associates. Gal drives them to the location of the creators of the videos, where Jay brutally murders all of them. Gal informs Jay that, from the archivist's safe, he took enough money to cover the contract money. The pair decide to abandon the contract and return home. When his cut hand becomes infected, Jay visits his regular doctor, only to find he has been replaced by another man who will only give him cryptic advice.

Jay and Gal return to their client and offer to find replacements for the last hit. The client refuses and says that both hitmen and their families will be killed if they do not complete the contract. Shel takes their son Sam to the family's cottage for safekeeping while Jay and Gal go back to work.

Their final mark, "The MP", is a Member of Parliament who lives in a mansion. While observing the house, the pair witness a strange ceremony in the woods that culminates in human sacrifice. Jay opens fire with an assault rifle, and the leader of the ceremony presents himself for Jay to execute. He kills the leader and several cultists before the remaining masked members chase the hitmen into an underground complex. They capture and disembowel Gal, forcing Jay to perform a mercy killing on him. Emerging from the tunnels, Jay flees to the family cottage and meets with Shel. When he goes outside, he finds their car tires have been slashed and lit torches have been placed around the nearby field. Jay attempts to locate their attackers, but he is knocked unconscious. Inside the cottage, Shel arms herself and shoots several invaders.

Jay awakens in the field surrounded by the cultists, who strip him and place a mask over his face. He is confronted by his last victim, "The Hunchback", a masked and cloaked person armed with a knife. After a brutal knife fight, Jay triumphs, only to discover that the Hunchback was his wife with Sam strapped to her back. Shel laughs as they both die. The cultists applaud and remove their masks, revealing Fiona, the client, and the man from the doctor's office amongst their numbers. Jay is then crowned by the cultists.

== Cast ==
- Neil Maskell as Jay
- Michael Smiley as Gal
- MyAnna Buring as Shel
- Emma Fryer as Fiona
- Harry Simpson as Sam
- Struan Rodger as The Client
- Ben Crompton as Justin
- Robin Hill as Stuart
- Gareth Tunley as The Priest
- Mark Kempner as The Librarian
- James Nickerson as The MP
- Robert Hill as High Priest
- Alice Lowe as Radio Reporter
- Steve Oram as Radio Reporter

== Production ==
After making Down Terrace, Wheatley wanted to use the lessons learned to make a horror film. The original treatment was a hybrid of the styles and themes of Get Carter and H. P. Lovecraft that was to have been shot in the Philippines. Shooting took place over 18 days. Wheatley was influenced by Stanley Kubrick in that he sought to find imagery first, then wove the plot around it. In each scene, they shot one take using the script and then paraphrased and improvised. The actors also worked out back stories for their characters through improvisation. The script was much more explicit in its themes and ideas, but Wheatley edited the film to form a more ambiguous and minimalist story. By keeping allusions to those scenes, he wanted to give viewers enough information to form their own interpretation. Wheatley dislikes exposition, so he decided to avoid it. Instead, he focused on his own fears: nightmares that he had as a child and domestic disharmony. Themes included suburban desolation, homogeneity, and showing hitmen as violent murderers. Wheatley also wanted to highlight current events: unpopular wars, a recession, and erosion of the social contract.

The film's story came partially from casting ideas, and Wheatley specifically wrote the part of Jay for Neil Maskell, with whom he'd worked previously on a TV series. Wheatley always had a plan for the ending and made sure the story was logically consistent, though he states that there are multiple possible interpretations and the cult itself remains scarier when its motives and background are shrouded in mystery. Wheatley states that cultists are a popular choice of antagonist because people are uneasy about the world and feel a lack of control and understanding; politicians and bankers who control their lives seem inscrutable. The cult's symbol was designed by Wheatley, who later recognised influence from The Blair Witch Project. Wheatley was worried people might call him on its similarities, but he was instead surprised to find people comparing it to a symbol from Harry Potter and the Deathly Hallows, with which he is unfamiliar. The film's most violent scene, the hammer murder, came about when Wheatley was surprised at the shocking violence in The Orphanage, which he had assumed would be a subtle art-house film. Wheatley stated that this turn toward violent horror in The Orphanage made the rest of the film unpredictable; he wanted a similar unpredictability in his own film, so that viewers were never sure whether the film would be subtle or explicit.

The song "It Could Have Been Better", used in the film, is performed by Joan Armatrading. It was written by Armatrading and Pam Nestor and is from the 1972 album Whatever's for Us.

== Release ==
The film's North American premiere was 12 March 2011 at SXSW in Austin. It was released to UK cinemas on 2 September 2011. IFC Films brought the film to video on demand 4 January 2012, and it received a US theatrical release 3 February 2012. It was released on home video in the UK on 26 December 2011 and 14 August 2012 in the US.

In 2025, a new 4K UHD version was released on Blu-ray in the US and Canada by Severin Films.

== Reception ==
Rotten Tomatoes, a review aggregator, reports that 77% of 87 surveyed critics gave the film a positive review, and the average rating was 7.1/10; the consensus is: "Kill List is an expertly executed slow-burn crime thriller that thrives on tension before morphing into visceral horror." Metacritic rated the film 67/100 based on 22 reviews.

Total Film rated the film 5/5 stars and said that as well as being a horror film it was "also a mystery movie, a road movie and a grotesque riff on Arthurian legend, and is influenced as much by John Cassavetes, Alan Clarke and Ken Loach as Witchfinder General, The Wicker Man and The Blood on Satan's Claw" before concluding that "[a]uthentic dialogue, pitch-perfect performances and seductively scuzzy images comprise a film funny and bleak, tender and cruel, serious and 'out-there'. British horror has rarely hit these heights since the mid-'70s." Peter Bradshaw reviewed the film for The Guardian and compared it to The Wicker Man and The Blair Witch Project, but he also said that Kill List "often looks like a film by Lynne Ramsay or even Lucrecia Martel, composed in a dreamily unhurried arthouse-realist style that is concerned to capture texture, mood and moment", concluding that "[a]s far as British horror goes right now, Kill List is pretty much top of the range". Mark Kermode reviewed the DVD release for The Observer and stated that "[t]he end result is one of the most genuinely disturbing films of the year, a ruthless exercise in audience manipulation that will put even the most hardened genre fans through the emotional mangler" and he later named it one of his favourite films of 2011. Philip French of The Observer called the film an "edgy, mysterious thriller that begins in one generic mode and jumps, or modulates, into another". Tom Huddleston of Time Out London rated the film 5/5 stars and compared it to the work of Shane Meadows. Huddleston called the film "nerve-shreddingly effective" and predicted the film would top rankings of British films.

Kill List also received positive reviews in America. John DeFore of The Hollywood Reporter called it a "deeply edgy, gory crime film [that] maintains perfectly calibrated tension before dropping a bombshell that will be too much for some viewers". Andrew Barker of Variety called it an "artful, sensitively acted thriller". Roger Ebert rated it 3/4 stars and called it "baffling and goofy, blood-soaked and not boring". David Harley of Bloody Disgusting rated it 4/5 stars and called it "an atmospheric delight, boasting incredibly intense performances by Maskell and Smiley, and a doozy of an ending that will unhinge even the most hardened of genre fans". Writing for Dread Central, Jason Jenkins rated the film 4.5/5 stars and placed the film on his personal top ten list of the year, while Gareth Jones rated it 3.5/5 stars and called it "an impeccably crafted thriller" that is frustrating for its lack of answers. Jeannette Catsoulis of The New York Times called the plot "undercooked and a little baffling" but wrote, "[W]hen the plot doglegs into insanity, and the characters follow suit, this brutal fever dream refuses to fall apart".

Owen Gleiberman of Entertainment Weekly rated it C and negatively compared it to its influences. Scott Tobias of NPR compared it to Lost's tendency to set up mysteries and leave them unexplained.

In 2015, the film was included in The Guardian's top 50 films of the demi-decade.

The A.V. Club listed it number 18 in their 25 Best Horror Movies Since The Year 2000.

== Awards ==
Kill List received a number of nominations in the 2011 British Independent Film Awards and went on to win one:

- Won: Best Supporting Actor for Michael Smiley
- Nominated: Best Achievement in Production
- Nominated: Best Actor for Neil Maskell
- Nominated: Best Actress for MyAnna Buring
- Nominated: Best Director for Ben Wheatley
- Nominated: Best Screenplay for Ben Wheatley and Amy Jump

London Critics Circle Film Awards:

- Nominated: British Film of the Year
- Nominated: Supporting Actor of the Year for Michael Smiley
