= Rebecca (2020 film) =

2020 film directed by Ben Wheatley

- Official release poster
- Directed by: Ben Wheatley
- Screenplay by: Jane Goldman; Joe Shrapnel; Anna Waterhouse
- Based on: Rebecca by Daphne du Maurier
- Produced by: Tim Bevan; Eric Fellner; Nira Park
- Starring: Lily James; Armie Hammer; Kristin Scott Thomas; Keeley Hawes; Ann Dowd; Sam Riley
- Cinematography: Laurie Rose
- Edited by: Jonathan Amos
- Music by: Clint Mansell
- Production companies: Working Title Films; Big Talk Productions
- Distributed by: Netflix
- Release date: 16 October 2020 (United Kingdom)
- Running time: 121 minutes
- Country: United Kingdom
- Language: English

Rebecca is a 2020 British romantic thriller film directed by Ben Wheatley from a screenplay by Jane Goldman, Joe Shrapnel and Anna Waterhouse. Based on the 1938 novel Rebecca by Daphne du Maurier, the film stars Lily James, Armie Hammer, Kristin Scott Thomas, Keeley Hawes, Ann Dowd, and Sam Riley. The film is about the intrigues that arise after a young woman marries a wealthy widower whose memory of his first wife, Rebecca, overshadows them both.

The film was released in select theatres on 16 October 2020, and digitally on Netflix five days later. It received negative reviews from critics, who compared the film unfavourably to the 1940 version directed by Alfred Hitchcock.

== Plot ==
While working for Mrs. Van Hopper in Monte Carlo, a young woman becomes acquainted with Maxim de Winter, a recent widower. After a brief courtship, they become engaged. They marry and then head to his mansion in England, Manderley.

Mrs. de Winter meets Mrs. Danvers, the housekeeper, who was devoted to his first wife Rebecca, who died in a boating accident. The staff and Maxim's friends also were fond of Rebecca. Mrs. Danvers emphasizes the new Mrs. de Winter's inferiority in comparison. Jack Favell, Rebecca's cousin, comes to visit, saying that Mrs. Danvers invited him. Learning of this infuriates Maxim, who banned him from the grounds, and accuses Mrs. de Winter of infidelity, which she denies. She confronts Mrs. Danvers for conspiring against her by inviting Favell, demanding her resignation. Mrs. Danvers insists he was lying.

The two begin working amicably together, with Mrs. Danvers assisting Mrs. de Winter in reviving the Manderley Costume Ball. Mrs. Danvers suggests that she choose a dress of a de Winter ancestor. When she wears it, guests are shocked and Maxim is furious. Mrs. de Winter learns that Rebecca wore the dress the previous year.

Realizing that Mrs. Danvers had manipulated her and believing that Maxim now regrets their marriage, Mrs. de Winter flees. Mrs. Danvers reveals her contempt for the new wife, believing she is trying to replace Rebecca. She tries to convince her to jump to her death from the window. However, she is thwarted by a nearby shipwreck brought from the storm. The ship is Rebecca's and her decomposed body is discovered on board.

This reopens the investigation into Rebecca's death. Maxim confesses to his wife that his marriage to Rebecca was a sham and that he always hated her. He states she was cruel, selfish, adulterous, and manipulative. On the night of her death, she told Maxim that she was pregnant with another man's child, which she would raise under the pretense that it was Maxim's. She placed his gun to her chest and stated that the only way to be free of her was to kill her. Enraged, Maxim pulled the trigger, then disposed of her body by placing it in her boat and sinking it.

Though disturbed by his confession, Mrs. de Winter is relieved to know that Maxim loves her and resolves to support him during the investigation. Favell attempts to blackmail Maxim, claiming to have proof that Rebecca did not intend suicide, in a note she had written. As in the novel, Maxim punches Favell down.

The trial shows Rebecca's boat to have been deliberately sunk. Testimony from Mrs. Danvers implies Rebecca's visit to a London doctor shortly before her death had to do with the pregnancy. The prosecutor produces Maxim's cheque written to Favell for the note, and Favell accuses Maxim of murdering Rebecca. Maxim is placed under arrest.

At Manderley, Mrs. Danvers reveals that Rebecca hated all the men in her life. Mrs. de Winter fires her, locates Rebecca's doctor and reads her file, which reveals that she could not have been pregnant due to advanced uterine cancer and would have died within a few months. An investigator concludes that Rebecca committed suicide by scuttling her boat, while Mrs. de Winter privately concludes that Rebecca had wanted Maxim to kill her.

Absolved, Maxim and his new wife drive home to find the mansion ablaze. A maid reveals that Mrs. Danvers started the fire and fled. Mrs. de Winter races to the cliffs, and finds Mrs. Danvers standing on a precipice. She pleads with her not to jump, but the older woman curses the de Winters to never know happiness and jumps into the sea and drowns.

Awakening from a dream years later, Mrs. de Winter is with her husband in Cairo, as they search for their dream home. She says that out of the wreck of Manderley she had saved the only thing worth saving – love.

== Cast ==
- Lily James as the second Mrs. de Winter
- Armie Hammer as Maxim de Winter
- Kristin Scott Thomas as Mrs. Danvers
- Keeley Hawes as Beatrice Lacy
- Ann Dowd as Mrs. Van Hopper
- Pippa Winslow as Mrs. Jean Cabot
- Sam Riley as Jack Favell
- Tom Goodman-Hill as Frank Crawley
- Mark Lewis Jones as Inspector Welch
- John Hollingworth as Giles Lacy
- Bill Paterson as Dr Baker
- Ben Crompton as Ben
- Jane Lapotaire as Granny
- Jeff Rawle as Frith
- Bryony Miller as Clarice, maid of Mrs. de Winter

== Production ==
It was announced in November 2018 that Lily James and Armie Hammer were set to star in the film, to be directed by Ben Wheatley, which Netflix would distribute. In May 2019, Kristin Scott Thomas, Keeley Hawes, Ann Dowd, Sam Riley, and Ben Crompton joined the cast of the film.

Filming began on 3 June 2019. Cranborne Manor in Dorset and Hartland Quay in Devon were used for filming in July 2019. In total, Rebecca was filmed at six different manors or estates. Along with Cranborne, Hatfield House was used for the interior hallways, Mapperton for Manderley's back garden (which is open for the public sometimes unlike the actual manor), Loseley Park for Manderley's staircases, Petworth House for one of the corridors full of marble statues and paintings, and lastly Osterley Park for Manderley's kitchen. The bedrooms of the former and the new Mrs. De Winter were both sets.

== Release ==
Rebecca was released into select British cinemas on 16 October 2020, and digitally on Netflix worldwide on 21 October 2020.

The film was the most-watched on the site in its first two days of release, before finishing second over the weekend. It was out of the top 10 by the following weekend. In November, Variety reported the film was the 11th most-watched straight-to-streaming title of 2020 up to that point.

== Reception ==
On the review aggregator website Rotten Tomatoes, 39% of 231 critics' reviews are positive, with an average rating of 5.4/10. The website's consensus reads: "Ben Wheatley's Rebecca remake is ravishing to behold, but it never quite gets to the heart of the classic source material -- or truly justifies its own existence." Metacritic, which uses a weighted average, assigned the film a score of 46 out of 100, based on 38 critics, indicating "mixed or average" reviews.

Peter Debruge of Variety wrote: "For about three-quarters of the running time, Rebecca does a respectable job of navigating between respect for the source and establishing its own distinct identity. And then, at precisely the moment where it stands to make a few enlightened improvements... this Rolls-Royce of an adaptation veers off the road."

Peter Bradshaw of The Guardian gave the film two out of five stars and wrote, "You can feel Wheatley... wanting to submit to the full bacchanalian horror of [the dress ball] sequence, and yet the story itself won't let him. This Rebecca leaves us with a secondary mystery – why precisely Wheatley wanted to do it."

Constance Grady from Vox gave the film two out of five stars and went even further, "Ben Wheatley has no business making a gothic romantic horror movie if he is not interested in gothic romantic horror, and on the evidence of this film, he is not." She concludes, "Wheatley’s Rebecca is a horror film that is resolutely sure there is nothing horrifying going on here at all, actually."

== See also ==
- Rebecca (1940 film), American film adaptation of the novel directed by Alfred Hitchcock
- Rebecca (1979 TV series)
- Rebecca (1997 miniseries), British-German miniseries adaptation of the novel directed by Jim O'Brien
- Rebecca (musical)
