= Noorpur Ki Rani =

- Intertitle
- Written by: Samira Fazal
- Directed by: Haissam Hussain
- Starring: Mahnoor Baloch; Sanam Baloch; Noman Ijaz; Samina Peerzada; Naila Jaffri; Qavi Khan; Azfar Rehman
- Country of origin: Pakistan
- Original language: Urdu
- No. of episodes: 23

Production
- Executive producer: Momina Duraid
- Camera setup: Multi-camera
- Running time: Approx. 45–50 minutes

Original release
- Network: Hum TV
- Release: 25 April – 3 October 2009

Noorpur Ki Rani (Urdu: نورپو ر کی رانی, lit. 'The Rani of Noorpur') is a Pakistani television series which was broadcast on Hum TV from 25 April 2009 to 3 October 2009. Written by Samira Fazal, and directed by Haissam Hussain, Noorpur Ki Rani was based on Daphne Du Maurier's 1938 novel Rebecca. The series stars Sanam Baloch, Nauman Ijaz and Mahnoor Baloch. The plot revolves around an orphan girl, and her journey to become the princess of Noorpur for which she dreamed so long.

At the 9th Lux Style Awards, Baloch received a Best TV Actress - Satellite nomination for her performance. Noorpur Ki Rani was also broadcast in India on Zindagi beginning 13 July 2014, and was also released on ZEE5.

== Cast ==
- Sanam Baloch as Noorulain Aneez/ Norrie; the young juvenile protagonist who matures when faces hurdles
- Mahnoor Baloch as Rania; Princess of the Noorpur and the wife of Salar
- Nauman Ijaz as Salar; Prince of Noorpur
- Samina Peerzada as Anna; the Catholic scheming head housekeeper in Rania's mansion, character based on Mrs. Danvers
- Qavi Khan as Sheikh Tahir Hussain
- Naila Jaffri as Shahida
- Azfar Rehman as Nofil
- Zaheen Tahira as Shahida's neighbour
- Mahira Bhatti as Hareem
- Saba Faisal as Hareem's mother
- Lubna Aslam as Vareesha
- Shamim Hilaly as Salar's mother
- Sanam Agha as Sonia
- Mehmood Akhtar as Akbar
- Seemi Pasha as Mrs. Akbar
- Shehnaz Pervaiz as Rani
- Mazhar Ali as Fayyaz
- Hina Dilpazir as Bano (episodes 1 & 2)
- Naeema Garaj as Bano's elder sister (Episode 2)
- Ayesha Sana as Ghausia, Orphanage incharge (episodes 1 & 2)
- Adnan Shah Tipu as factory worker (episodes 1 & 2)

== Plot ==
The story revolves around Noorulain Aneez, often referred to as Noorie, an orphan. After her parents' death, she lives with her uncle (her father's brother), who later dies too. Bano, Noorie's uncle's wife, wants her gone and leaves her in an orphanage, despite the owner's refusal due to lack of space. Noorie stays at the orphanage for some days. An old man, Tahir, and his daughter Shahida want to adopt a male child to educate and eventually handle their business. They ask their family friend to arrange for some male children. The neighbor calls the orphanage owner, asking for a male child, but she refuses, saying there are no boys available. When he insists on searching for a male child, the servant at the orphanage suggests sending Noorie, as she is very talkative and notorious. The servant takes Noorie to the city where Tahir lives, leaves her at the station, and runs away. Shahida is shocked to see a girl, as she wanted a boy to adopt. Despite her father's advice to keep Noorie, she sends her to Mr. Akbar. Mr. Akbar has a bad temper and always shouts at everyone. He has a spoiled daughter, Sonia. At night, Mr. Akbar tries to harass Noorie, but his wife catches him and blames Noorie. Mrs. Akbar scolds Noorie and threatens to send her back to the orphanage the next morning. Noorie runs away from the home after everyone sleeps and meets with a car accident involving Tahir's car. Tahir brings Noorie back to his house, and eventually convinces Shahida to keep her. They trust Noorie despite Mrs. Akbar's false accusations. Noorie faces problems at school, as Sonia is her classmate, and she doesn't understand English. After completing her 10th grade, she plans to enrol in a nearby college, but her adopted parents want to send her abroad. Tahir and Shahida die in an accident, leaving Noorie an orphan again. Nofil, Noorie's classmate who loves her, decides to marry her, but Hareem's mother forbids them. Nofil then brings her to his house, where she lives with his parents. Princess Rania of Noorpur wants a romantic life with her husband Salar, but he doesn't care about her, thinking she has everything a woman can wish for. After fights and hatred, her husband locks her in a room. She flees with her maid Anna's help but dies in a car accident. In Nofil's house, Salar meets Noorie, likes her simplicity, and marries her. She becomes Princess Noorulain of Noorpur. However, Anna cannot bear Noorie taking Rania's place and wants to get rid of her. Anna tries to make Noorie look like Rania to make Salar hate her. Noorulain starts hating Salar but learns truth when Salar gives her Rania's diary, revealing Rania's hatred for Salar. After clearing misunderstandings, Anna decides to avenge Rania by assaulting Noorie. She calls Rania's cousin for this purpose in Salar's absence. Noorie manages to save herself, and Salar arrives in time to save her.

== Reception ==
A reviewer, writing for Mag The Weekly, praised the strong acting performances of the actors but faulted for leaving room for improvement in its writing and direction.

=== Accolades ===
| Year | Award | Category | Nominee | Result | Ref. |
|---|---|---|---|---|---|
| 2010 | Lux Style Awards | Best TV Actress - Satellite | Sanam Baloch | Nominated | |
| 2010 | Pakistan Media Awards | Best Drama Producer | Momina Duraid | Won | |
