= Mrs Danvers (band) =

Indie pop band from Boston, Massachusetts

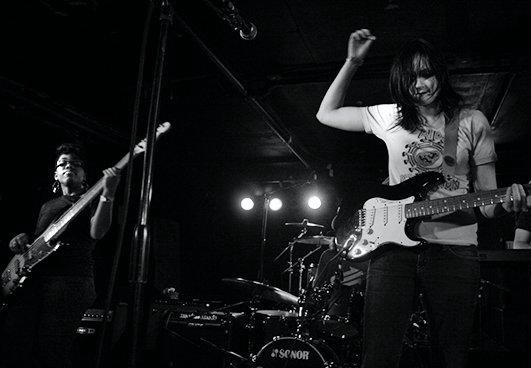
- Mrs Danvers opening for The Cliks in 2009

Background information
- Origin: Boston, Massachusetts, U.S.
- Genre: Indie Pop
- Years active: 2009-present
- Label: Unsigned
- Members: Ann Driscoll; Dhy Berry; Steph Barker
- Past members: Randi Bernier; Lauren Vargas
- Website: Official Website

Mrs Danvers is an American indie pop band from Boston, Massachusetts. The band consists of Ann Driscoll (lead vocals/guitar/synth), Dhy Berry (bass/synth/vocals), and Steph Barker (drums). Though having formed in January 2009, they have already built a cult following among the LGBT community. They borrow their stage moniker from the character from the novel Rebecca by Daphne du Maurier, best known for its 1940 film adaptation directed by Alfred Hitchcock. In August 2009, the band released their debut EP, What Did I Do.

== History ==
The idea of Mrs Danvers was created by Ann Driscoll after enrolling in a Hitchcock film course at the University of Missouri. Realizing she would rather pursue a career in music than journalism, Driscoll left Missouri to attend Berklee College of Music. While attending Berklee, Driscoll befriended fellow students Dhy Berry, Randi Bernier and Steph Barker. They count The Beatles, Metric, Of Montreal and CAKE as prime influences.

=== LGBT Involvement and Response ===
Mrs Danvers has opened for Corin Tucker of Sleater-Kinney, God-Des and She, The Cliks and Hunter Valentine. They have also headlined the Boston Dyke March in June 2009. The band has received large amounts of praise within the LGBT community, most notably from Grammy Award nominated artist, Meshell Ndegeocello who stated "You have something to say and people wanna hear it". LGBT publications such as Autostraddle and Bay Windows have featured the band. In June 2010, Mrs Danvers performed on the main stage at the Boston Pride Festival.

=== Sponsorship ===
In August 2009 Mer+ge, a clothing company, which specializes in graphic tees with a message, responded to the band's empowering music and diverse lineup, and sponsored the band.

== Recent Activity ==
In April 2010, Mrs Danvers recorded their debut untitled full-length album. A release date has not been finalized.

== Discography ==
=== EPs ===
- What Did I Do (August 28, 2009)
