= Rebecca's Tale =

Novel by Sally Beauman

- First edition cover
- Author: Sally Beauman
- Language: English
- Genre: Novel
- Publisher: Little, Brown
- Publication date: 17 September 2001
- Publication place: United Kingdom
- Media type: Print (Hardback & Paperback)
- Pages: 512 pp (hardback edition) & 624 p. (paperback edition)
- ISBN: 0-316-85812-9 (hardback edition) & ISBN 0-7515-3313-0 (paperback edition)
- OCLC: 47037274
- Preceded by: Rebecca

Rebecca's Tale is a 2001 novel by British author Sally Beauman. The book is a sequel to the Daphne du Maurier novel Rebecca and is officially approved by the Du Maurier estate. It continues the original plot and is also roughly consistent with the 1993 sequel Mrs de Winter by Susan Hill.

== Background ==
The main story is set about two decades after the death of the ravishingly beautiful yet evil Rebecca de Winter and follows the attempts of the former magistrate Colonel Julyan to uncover the truth behind her enigmatic life and death, with the help of his daughter Ellie and a mysterious young scholar. There is also a "prequel" section that reproduces a journal that Rebecca wrote shortly before she died.

The novel summaries the original events from Rebecca to the extent where it can be read alone, though reading it as a sequel is preferable. It has been criticized for Beauman's revisionist interpretations of characters created by du Maurier, and for certain aspects of her own invented characters. Nevertheless, it continues to be popularly read by fans of Rebecca.

== Structure ==
Rebecca's Tale is set in the summer of 1951 in England. The action is centered in Kerrith and the surrounding area, including the district near Manderley. The book is narrated in the first person in the style of du Maurier; however, unlike the original book, the narrator changes with each of the four sections. Part 1 is told from the perspective of the septuagenarian Colonel Julyan, who had led the initial inquests into Rebecca's death. Part 2 is told by Terence Gray, an original character, whose on-going investigations are driven by a mystery from his own past. Part 3 is an extract from a journal kept by Rebecca, detailing the events of her early life. The final part is told by Ellie Julyan, the Colonel's youngest daughter, who cares for her father at home.

The narrative shifts produce a very different structure from the original Rebecca, as well as a more postmodern tone that emphasizes the various narrators' unreliability. Also, the book is sometimes placed in a separate genre: while Rebecca is classified as a Gothic novel (du Maurier detested its categorisation as a romance), Rebecca's Tale is often considered a mystery.

== Plot summary ==
Rebecca's Tale continues two decades after du Maurier's epic conclusion and begins with the same classic line: "Last night I dreamt I went to Manderley again." Most of the characters from the original novel have left the area: Maximilian de Winter died in a car accident before this sequel begins and Colonel Julyan has retired to a quiet life at home. None of the other characters from the original novel make significant appearances, although some have cameos. While in the original novel, Rebecca was ultimately described as a cruel and wanton woman, in this sequel she is presented as a tormented girl, haunted by her traumatic childhood and deeply sad despite her outward boldness.

Although the connection was unknown to most of Rebecca's acquaintances in adulthood (including her eventual husband Maximilian de Winter), her mother was the younger sister of Maxim's mother. Maxim's father had seduced his young aunt before she was sent away in disgrace to France, potentially making Rebecca Maxim's paternal half-sister as well as his first cousin. However, Rebecca's father was generally understood to be "Black Jack" Devlin, an Irish gambler and speculator.

During Rebecca's early childhood in Brittany, she was raised to believe that Devlin had died while sailing to South Africa, where he was in fact alive and investing in diamond mines. She and her mother were supported by money sent from their relations in England. When she was still a young girl, she was raped by a boy in their French village, teaching her to mistrust, loathe, and manipulate men. Rebecca, however, is self-sufficient, assertive, and strong in her own right, and thus refuses to be held back or shamed by this terrible experience.

At the end, taking partial inspiration from Rebecca's more positive ideals, Ellie Julyan rejects the conventionality of her bucolic country life to pursue her own dreams and ambitions, while Terence Gray reconciles with his own identity and opens himself to love.
