= Rebecca (novel) =

1938 novel by Daphne du Maurier

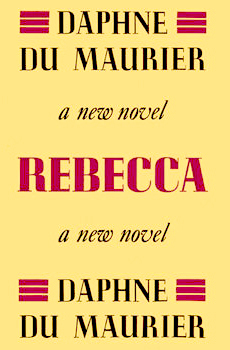
- First edition
- Author: Daphne du Maurier
- Language: English
- Genre: Gothic; romance; mystery; crime
- Publisher: Victor Gollancz Ltd
- Publication date: 5 August 1938
- Publication place: United Kingdom
- Pages: 446 pp
- OCLC: 527505

Rebecca is a 1938 Gothic novel by the English author Daphne du Maurier. It depicts an unnamed young woman who impetuously marries a wealthy widower, before discovering that both he and his household are haunted by the memory of his late first wife, the title character.

A bestseller which has never gone out of print, Rebecca sold 2.8 million copies between its publication in 1938 and 1965. It has been adapted numerous times for stage and screen, including a 1939 play by du Maurier herself, the film Rebecca (1940), directed by Alfred Hitchcock, which won the Academy Award for Best Picture, and the 2020 remake directed by Ben Wheatley for Netflix. The story has been adapted as a musical.

The novel is remembered especially for the character of Mrs. Danvers, the West Country estate Manderley, which du Maurier's editor noted "is as much an atmosphere as a tangible erection of stones and mortar", and its opening line: "Last night, I dreamt I went to Manderley again."

== Plot ==
In a scene-setting introduction, the unnamed narrator dreams of her husband's estate, Manderley, lamenting that she cannot return. Time has passed since its destruction, during which the couple have settled into "a quiet peace" in small Mediterranean hotels.

In her early twenties, the narrator works as a companion to a rich American woman, Mrs. Van Hopper, who is on holiday in Monte Carlo. They meet the wealthy 42-year-old Maximilian de Winter. He is a widower whose wife, Rebecca, drowned in a sailing accident a year earlier. After a fortnight of courtship, she becomes the second Mrs. de Winter and accompanies him to Manderley, his estate in Cornwall, where she is introduced to Mrs Danvers, housekeeper and former lady's maid to Rebecca.

Mrs Danvers continually attempts to undermine the narrator psychologically, suggesting to her that she will never attain the beauty and elegance of her predecessor. She shows the narrator the west wing of the house, which overlooks the sea. The west wing was formerly Rebecca's bedroom, which she has preserved as a shrine to her late mistress. When the narrator makes small requests, Mrs Danvers and the other staff describe how Rebecca ran Manderley when she was alive. Cowed by Mrs Danvers' imposing manner and the other members of West Country society's unwavering reverence for Rebecca, the narrator becomes isolated.

The narrator is soon convinced that Maxim regrets his impetuous decision to marry her, and that he is still deeply in love with the seemingly perfect Rebecca. Manderley hosts a costume ball, a custom Rebecca had instated. Mrs Danvers suggests the narrator wears a replica of the dress from a portrait of one of the house's former inhabitants. When Maxim sees the dress, he angrily orders her to change; Rebecca had worn the same costume to much acclaim shortly before her death.

Mrs Danvers encourages the narrator to kill herself by jumping from Rebecca's bedroom window. However, she is interrupted by the disturbance caused by a nearby shipwreck. A diver has discovered the remains of Rebecca's sailing boat, with her decomposed body still on board, despite Maxim's having identified as Rebecca's a different body that had washed ashore two months after her sailing boat disappeared.

This discovery causes Maxim to confess that his marriage to Rebecca was a sham. Rebecca, Maxim reveals, was a cruel and selfish woman who took many lovers while manipulating everyone around her into believing her to be the perfect wife and a paragon of virtue. On the night of her death, she taunted Maxim with the prospect of having another man's child, which she would raise under the pretence that it was Maxim's, and he would be unable to prove otherwise. Enraged, Maxim shot and killed Rebecca. He then disposed of her body by placing it in her boat and sinking it at sea. The narrator is relieved to hear that Maxim has always loved her and never Rebecca.

Rebecca's boat is raised, and it is discovered to have been deliberately sunk. An inquest brings a verdict of suicide. However, Rebecca's first cousin and lover, Jack Favell, attempts to blackmail Maxim, claiming that a note she sent to him the night she died demonstrates that she could not have intended suicide and that therefore Maxim murdered her. It is revealed that Rebecca had had an appointment with a doctor in London the day of her death, which the narrator suspects was to confirm a pregnancy. When the doctor is found, he reveals that Rebecca had cancer and would have died within a few months. Furthermore, due to a malformation of her uterus, she could never have been pregnant. Maxim assumes that Rebecca, knowing that she would die, manipulated him into killing her quickly. Mrs Danvers had said after the inquiry that Rebecca feared nothing except dying a lingering death.

On hearing that Mrs Danvers has abruptly disappeared from Manderley, Maxim feels a great sense of foreboding and insists on driving through the night to return home. Before they come in sight of the house, it is clear from a glow on the horizon and wind-borne ashes that it is ablaze.

== Characters ==
=== Principal characters ===
- The Narrator/the Second Mrs de Winter: A timid, naïve, middle-class woman in her early twenties, who enjoys sketching. Neither the narrator's first nor maiden name is revealed. She is referred to as "my wife", "Mrs de Winter", "my dear", and so on. The one time she is introduced with a name is during a fancy dress ball, in which she dresses as a de Winter ancestor and is introduced as "Caroline de Winter", although this is clearly not her own name. She signs her name as "Mrs M. de Winter", using Maxim's initial. Early in the novel she receives a letter and remarks that her name was correctly spelled, which is "an unusual thing," suggesting her name is uncommon, foreign or complex. While courting her, Maxim compliments her on her "lovely and unusual name". Initially timid, she gains a sense of confidence over the course of the novel.
- Maximilian "Maxim" de Winter: The reserved, unemotional owner of Manderley. He marries his new wife after a brief courtship, yet displays little affection toward her after the marriage. Emotionally scarred by his traumatic marriage to Rebecca, his distance toward his new wife causes her to fear he regrets his marriage to her and is still haunted by Rebecca's death. Maxim killed Rebecca after she taunted him with the prospect of raising an illegitimate child as Maxim's heir.
- Mrs Danvers: The cold, overbearing housekeeper of Manderley. Danvers was Rebecca's family maid when she was a child and has lived with her for years. She is obsessed with Rebecca and preserving Rebecca's memory. She resents the new Mrs de Winter, convinced she is trying to "take Rebecca's place", and continually psychologically torments her. She tries to undermine the new Mrs de Winter, but her efforts fail.
- Rebecca de Winter: The unseen, deceased title character, who has been dead for less than a year. A famous beauty, and on the surface a devoted wife and perfect hostess, Rebecca was actually unfaithful to her husband Maxim. Her lingering presence overwhelms Manderley, dominating the visitors, the staff and the new Mrs de Winter.

== Development ==
In 1937, Daphne du Maurier signed a three-book deal with Victor Gollancz and accepted an advance of £1,000. A 2008 article in The Daily Telegraph indicates she had been toying with the theme of jealousy for the five years since her marriage in 1932. She started "sluggishly" and wrote a desperate apology to Gollancz: "The first 15,000 words I tore up in disgust and this literary miscarriage has cast me down rather."

Her husband, Tommy "Boy" Browning, was Lieutenant Colonel of the Grenadier Guards and they were posted to Alexandria, Egypt, with the Second Battalion, leaving Britain on 30 July 1937. Gollancz expected her manuscript on their return to Britain in December but she wrote that she was "ashamed to tell you that progress is slow on the new novel...There is little likelihood of my bringing back a finished manuscript in December."

On returning to Britain in December 1937, du Maurier decided to spend Christmas away from her family to write the book and she successfully delivered it to her publisher less than four months later. Du Maurier described the plot as "a sinister tale about a woman who marries a widower....Psychological and rather macabre."

=== Derivation and inspiration ===
Some commentators have noted parallels with Charlotte Brontë's Jane Eyre. Another of du Maurier's works, Jamaica Inn, is also linked to one of the Brontë sisters' works, Emily's Wuthering Heights.

While du Maurier "categorised Rebecca as a study in jealousy ... she admitted its origins in her own life to few." Her husband had been previously engaged to Jan Ricardo, a glamorous dark-haired figure. Du Maurier was apparently haunted by the suspicion that Browning remained attracted to Ricardo. In The Rebecca Notebook of 1981, du Maurier recalled the novel's gestation: "Seeds began to drop. A beautiful home ... a first wife ... jealousy, a wreck, perhaps at sea, near to the house ... But something terrible would have to happen, I did not know what..." In her preliminary notes for the novel, she wrote: "I want to build up the character of the first [wife] in the mind of the second...until wife 2 is haunted day and night...a tragedy is looming very close and CRASH! BANG! something happens."

Like Rebecca and Maximilian de Winter, du Maurier and her husband were not faithful to one another. Jan Ricardo eventually died by suicide during the Second World War, throwing herself under a train.

Du Maurier commented publicly in her lifetime that the book was based on her own memories of Menabilly and Cornwall, as well as her relationship with her father. The depictions of Manderly may have been influenced by du Maurier's childhood visits to Milton Hall, Cambridgeshire (then in Northamptonshire) home of the Wentworth-Fitzwilliam family.

=== Plagiarism allegations ===
Shortly after Rebecca was published in Brazil, critic Álvaro Lins pointed out many resemblances between du Maurier's book and the work of Brazilian writer Carolina Nabuco. Nabuco's A Sucessora (The Successor), published in 1934, has a main plot similar to Rebecca, for example a young woman marrying a widower and the strange presence of the first wife—plot features also shared with the far older Jane Eyre. Nina Auerbach alleged in her book Daphne du Maurier, Haunted Heiress, that du Maurier read the English version of the Brazilian book when the first drafts were sent to the same publisher as hers in order to be published in England, and based her famous best-seller on it.

Immediately following a 1941 article in The New York Times Book Review highlighting the two novels' many similarities, du Maurier issued a rebuttal in a letter to the editor. According to Nabuco's autobiography, Eight Decades, she (Nabuco) refused to sign an agreement brought to her by a United Artists' representative in which she would concede that the similarities between her book and the movie were mere coincidence. A further, ironic complication in Nabuco's allegations is the similarity between her novel and the novel Encarnação, written by José de Alencar, one of Brazil's most celebrated novelists of the nineteenth century, and published posthumously in 1893.

In 1944, according to The Hollywood Reporter, du Maurier, her U.S. publishers Doubleday and United Artists, distributors of the film adaptation, were sued for plagiarism by Edwina Levin MacDonald who alleged that du Maurier had copied her 1927 novel Blind Windows, and sought an undisclosed amount of accounting and damages. The complaint was eventually dismissed on 14 January 1948.

== Publishing history ==
Du Maurier delivered the manuscript to her publisher, Victor Gollancz, in April 1938. On receipt, the book was read in Gollancz's office, and her "editor, Norman Collins, reported simply: 'The new Daphne du Maurier contains everything that the public could want.'" Gollancz's "reaction to Rebecca was relief and jubilation" and "a 'rollicking success' was predicted by him." He "did not hang around" and "ordered a first print run of 20,000 copies and within a month Rebecca had sold more than twice that number." The novel has been continuously in print since 1938 and in 1993 "du Maurier's US publishers Avon estimated ongoing monthly paperback sales of Rebecca at more than 4,000 copies."

=== Promotion ===
Du Maurier "did several radio interviews with BBC and other stations" and "attended Foyle's Literary Lunch" in August 1938 while Good Housekeeping, Ladies Home Journal, and House & Garden published articles on du Maurier.

== Critical reception and awards ==
The Times stated that "the material is of the humblest ... nothing in this is beyond the novelette." In The Christian Science Monitor of 14 September 1938, V.S. Pritchett predicted the novel "would be here today, gone tomorrow."

More recently, in a column for The Independent, the critics Ceri Radford and Chris Harvey recommended the book and argued that Rebecca is a "marvellously gothic tale" with a good dose of atmospheric and psychological horror.

Few critics saw in the novel what the author wanted them to see: the exploration of the relationship between a man who is powerful and a woman who is not.

In the U.S., du Maurier won the National Book Award for favourite novel of 1938, voted by members of the American Booksellers Association. In 2003, the novel was listed at number 14 on the UK survey The Big Read.

In 2017, it was voted the UK's favourite book of the past 225 years in a poll by bookseller WHSmith. Other novels on the shortlist included To Kill a Mockingbird by Harper Lee, Pride and Prejudice by Jane Austen, Jane Eyre by Charlotte Brontë, and Nineteen Eighty-Four by George Orwell.

On 5 November 2019, the BBC listed Rebecca on its list of the 100 most inspiring novels.

== Adaptations ==
=== Film ===
The best known theatrical film adaptation is the Academy Award–winning 1940 film version by Alfred Hitchcock, the first film Hitchcock made under his contract with David O. Selznick. The film, which stars Laurence Olivier as Maxim, Joan Fontaine as his wife, and Dame Judith Anderson as Mrs Danvers, was based on the novel. However, the Hollywood Production Code required that if Maxim had murdered his wife, he would have to be punished for his crime. Therefore, the key turning point of the novel—the revelation that Maxim, in fact, murdered Rebecca—was altered so that Rebecca's death was accidental. This change had not been made in Orson Welles' previous radio play which included a promotion of the film. At the end of the film version, Mrs Danvers perishes in the fire, which she had started. The film quickly became a classic, and at the time, was a major technical achievement in film-making.

An Indian film adaptation titled Kohraa followed in 1964, directed by Biren Nag, written by Dhruva Chatterjee, and starring Waheeda Rehman, Biswajeet and Lalita Pawar.

In 2020, Netflix released an adaptation, directed by Ben Wheatley and written by Jane Goldman, starring Lily James as the second Mrs de Winter, Armie Hammer as Maxim, and Kristin Scott Thomas as Mrs Danvers.

=== Television ===
Pan UK paperback edition cover (showing Joanna David as Mrs de Winter from the BBC television production. Jeremy Brett played the role of Maxim de Winter.)

Rebecca was adapted for The Philco Television Playhouse (10 October 1948), with Mary Anderson and Bramwell Fletcher; Robert Montgomery Presents (22 May 1950), with Barbara Bel Geddes and Peter Cookson; and Broadway Television Theatre (1 September 1952), with Patricia Breslin and Scott Forbes.

Theatre '62 presented an NBC-TV adaptation starring James Mason as Maxim, Joan Hackett as the second Mrs de Winter, and Nina Foch as Mrs Danvers.

Rebecca, a 1979 BBC adaptation, was directed by Simon Langton and starred Jeremy Brett as Maxim, Joanna David as the second Mrs de Winter, and Anna Massey (Jeremy Brett's former wife) as Mrs Danvers. It ran for four 55-minute episodes. It was broadcast in the United States on PBS as part of its Mystery! series.

Rebecca, a 1997 Carlton Television drama serial, starred Emilia Fox (Joanna David's daughter, in the same role played by her mother in 1979), Charles Dance as de Winter, and Dame Diana Rigg as Mrs Danvers. It was directed by Jim O'Brien, with a screenplay by Arthur Hopcraft. It was broadcast in the United States by PBS as part of Masterpiece Theatre. This adaptation is noteworthy for featuring an appearance by Rebecca, played by Lucy Cohu. It also shows Maxim saving Mrs Danvers from the fire, ending with an epilogue showing Maxim and the second Mrs de Winter relaxing abroad, as she explains what she and Maxim do with their days now they are unlikely ever to return to Manderley.

In 2008, a two-part Italian TV adaption, loosely based on the novel and named Rebecca, la prima moglie, aired on the national public broadcaster RAI. The episodes feature Alessio Boni as Maxim de Winter, Cristiana Capotondi as Jennifer de Winter and Mariangela Melato as Mrs Danvers. The miniseries was filmed in Trieste.

Noor Pur Ki Rani, an Urdu language Pakistani drama television series adaptation directed by Haissam Hussain and dramatized by Pakistani writer and author Samira Fazal, was broadcast on Hum TV in 2009. The main role was played by Sanam Baloch.

=== Radio ===
The first adaptation of Rebecca for any medium was presented 9 December 1938, by Orson Welles, as the debut program of his live CBS Radio series The Campbell Playhouse (the sponsored continuation of The Mercury Theatre on the Air). Introducing the story, Welles refers to the forthcoming motion picture adaptation by David O. Selznick; at the conclusion of the show he interviews Daphne du Maurier in London via shortwave radio. The novel was adapted by Howard E. Koch. Welles and Margaret Sullavan starred as Max de Winter and the second Mrs de Winter. Other cast included Mildred Natwick (Mrs Danvers), Ray Collins (Frank Crawley), George Coulouris (Captain Searle), Frank Readick (as Ben), Alfred Shirley (Frith), Eustace Wyatt (Coroner) and Agnes Moorehead (Mrs Van Hopper). Bernard Herrmann composed and conducted the score, which later formed the basis of his score for the 1943 film Jane Eyre.

The Screen Guild Theater presented half-hour adaptions with Joan Fontaine, her husband at the time Brian Aherne, and Agnes Moorehead (31 May 1943), and with Loretta Young, John Lund and Agnes Moorehead (18 November 1948). Joan Fontaine and Joseph Cotten performed a half-hour adaptation 1 October 1946 on The Cresta Blanca Hollywood Players.

The Lux Radio Theatre presented hour-long adaptations with Ronald Colman, Ida Lupino and Judith Anderson (3 February 1941), and with Laurence Olivier, Vivien Leigh and Betty Blythe (6 November 1950). These were tie-ins to the Hitchcock film, and perpetuated the censorship of the novel which the Hays Office had imposed on that film, although Orson Welles' radio version which predated the film (and including a promotion for the film) was faithful to the original, asserting that Max de Winter had deliberately murdered Rebecca.

=== Theatre ===
Du Maurier herself adapted Rebecca as a stage play in 1939; it had a successful London run in 1940 of over 350 performances. The popular Talking Books for the blind edition read by Barbara Caruso is based on this stage adaptation; it differs materially from the novel in many respects and includes a change to the original conclusion of the novel.

A Broadway stage adaptation starring Diana Barrymore, Bramwell Fletcher and Florence Reed ran 18 January – 3 February 1945, at the Ethel Barrymore Theatre.

The stage adaptation of Rebecca was produced by the Brunton Theatre Company in Musselburgh, under the direction of Charles Nowosielski, in January and February 1990.

The book has also been adapted into a German-language musical, Rebecca, which opened in Vienna in 2006 and ran for three years.

=== Opera ===
Rebecca was adapted as an opera with music by Wilfred Josephs, premiered by Opera North in Leeds, England, 15 October 1983.

== Sequels and related works ==
The novel has inspired three additional books approved by the du Maurier estate:

- Mrs de Winter (1993) by Susan Hill. (ISBN 978-0-09-928478-9)
- The Other Rebecca (1996) by Maureen Freely. (ISBN 978-0-89733-477-8)
- Rebecca's Tale (2001) by Sally Beauman (ISBN 978-0-06-621108-4)

In addition, a number of fan fiction websites feature sequels, prequels, and adaptations of this novel.

== As a code key in World War II ==
One edition of the book was used by the Germans in World War II as the key to a book code. Sentences would be made using single words in the book, referred to by page number, line and position in the line. One copy was kept at Rommel's headquarters, and the other was carried by German Abwehr agents infiltrated into Cairo after crossing Egypt by car, guided by Count László Almásy. This code never was used, however, because the radio section of the headquarters was captured in a skirmish and hence the Germans suspected that the code was compromised.

This use of the book is referred to in Ken Follett's novel The Key to Rebecca—where a (fictional) spy does use it to pass critical information to Rommel. This use was also referenced in Michael Ondaatje's 1992 novel The English Patient.
