= Mrs. Danvers =

Main antagonist of Daphne du Maurier's 1938 novel Rebecca

- Rebecca character
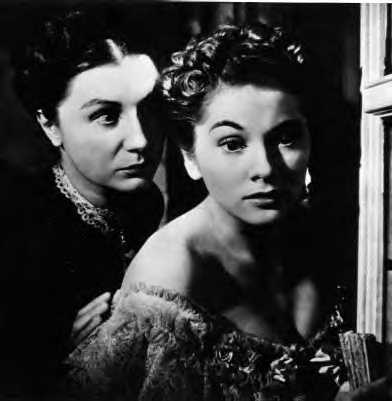
- Still from the 1940 film adaption by Alfred Hitchcock: Mrs. Danvers (left, Judith Anderson) attempts to persuade Mrs. de Winter (Joan Fontaine) to leap to her death.
- First appearance: Literature: Rebecca (1938); Film / Television: "Rebecca" (1940)
- Created by: Daphne du Maurier
- Portrayed by: Judith Anderson; Dorothy Black; Nina Foch; Anna Massey; Diana Rigg; Mariangela Melato; Kristin Scott Thomas

In-universe information
- Nickname: Danny
- Species: Human
- Gender: Female
- Occupation: Lady's Maid
- Nationality: British

Mrs. Danvers is the main antagonist of Daphne du Maurier's 1938 novel Rebecca. Danvers is the head housekeeper at Manderley, the stately manor belonging to the wealthy Maximillian "Maxim" de Winter, where he once lived with his first wife, Rebecca, whom she had adored obsessively. In the 1940 film version, directed by Alfred Hitchcock, the character was played by Judith Anderson, who was nominated for an Academy Award for Best Supporting Actress.

== Her role in the novel ==
Nicknamed "Danny" by Rebecca, (but never given a first name), Mrs. Danvers was Rebecca's maid as a child. Following Rebecca's death, Mrs. Danvers persecutes the new Mrs. de Winter, convinced she is trying to "take Rebecca's place" despite the two women never meeting and being nothing alike. She also resents Maxim for remarrying, and she tries to break up the marriage. Late in the story she suggests that Mrs. de Winter wear a particular dress to a costume ball knowing Rebecca wore it to the costume ball the year before. It angers Mr. de Winter, and when the new wife confronts Mrs. Danvers about her deception, Mrs. Danvers attempts to manipulate her into jumping out of the third-floor window.

After Rebecca's body is found, Mrs. Danvers realizes that Maxim killed her. She abruptly packs and leaves Manderley. On learning this, Maxim has a sense of foreboding and rushes back from London. As he and Mrs. de Winter approach they see a glow on the horizon and ashes on the wind indicating the house is burning, the fire implied to be set by Mrs. Danvers. Her fate remains unknown; early in the novel, the narrator, looking back on the events of the story, writes, "Mrs. Danvers. I wonder what she is doing now."

== Portrayal in screen adaptations ==
Mrs. Danvers was first, and most famously, portrayed by Judith Anderson in Alfred Hitchcock's film adaptation released in 1940. Anderson was nominated for an Academy Award for Best Supporting Actress. Mrs. Danvers later was played by several actresses for television adaptations, such as Dorothy Black in 1947, Nina Foch in 1962, Anna Massey in 1979, Diana Rigg in 1997, and by Mariangela Melato in a 2008 Italian TV adaptation. Kristin Scott Thomas portrayed Danvers in the 2020 Netflix film. Pia Douwes portrayed her in the German-language musical version performed in Stuttgart, from December 2011 to 2013. She was portrayed by Willemijn Verkaik in the 2022 Viennese revival of the musical.

In the book, Mrs. Danvers is given a back story. In contrast, the Hitchcock and all subsequent film adaptations never mention her past.

== Lesbian overtones ==
In the 1996 documentary The Celluloid Closet, screenwriter Susie Bright suggests Mrs. Danvers may have harbored romantic and sexual feelings for the late Rebecca. She cites Mrs. Danvers' admiration of Rebecca's underclothes, and Danvers lovingly showing the new Mrs. de Winter Rebecca's lingerie. This is a recurring suggestion amongst analyses of the film.

== In popular culture ==
=== In film ===
The characters of Frau Blücher in Young Frankenstein and Nurse Charlotte Diesel in High Anxiety, both played by Cloris Leachman and directed by Mel Brooks, are parodies of Mrs. Danvers.

In 1971 horror film Night of Dark Shadows, upon arriving at the opulent estate of Collinwood, Quentin Collins' wife Tracy makes a comment about how she may become "one of those women you see in houses with a garden", and comments that the housekeeper at the estate probably looks "just like Mrs. Danvers".

In the 1946 Abbott and Costello comedy The Time of Their Lives, upon entering the Danbury Estate, Binnie Barnes' character, Mildred, turns to Gale Sondergaard’s housekeeper character, Emily, and says "Didn’t I see you in Rebecca?"

=== In television ===
In 1972, in the third episode of the sixth season of The Carol Burnett Show, Vicki Lawrence played Mrs. Dampers in the sketch "Rebecky", a take-off of the film.

In the series Monk, season 1 episode 7 "Mr. Monk and the Billionaire Mugger", during the opening scene, Sidney Teal is walking out of his palatial home. He says goodbye to his servants as he leaves. They are all shown on camera until he looks to the camera and says "Good night, Mrs. Danvers."

David Mitchell portrays Mrs. Danvers in a sketch which parodies the 1940 film in the second series of That Mitchell and Webb Look. In the sketch, instead of the obsession over Rebecca, it is she who is unable to live up to the second wife's lofty expectations.

In the series The Sopranos, season 4 episode 12 "Eloise", during the scene where Meadow and her mother, Carmela, are having tea and pastries at the Plaza Hotel under Eloise's portrait, Carmela begins criticizing Meadow about her boyfriend, Finn, so Meadow says "Well, excuse me, Mrs. Danvers. What do you have against love?"

=== In music ===
The band Mrs. Danvers takes its name from the character.

=== In print ===
Val McDermid's modern retelling of Jane Austen's Northanger Abbey mentions Mrs Danvers.

Stephen King's book, Bag of Bones, alludes to the character Mrs. Danvers numerous times. Mrs. Danvers serves as something of a bogeyman for the main character, Mike Noonan. King also uses the character's name for the chilly, obedient servant in "Father's Day," a tale in his 1982 film Creepshow.

In Jasper Fforde's Thursday Next series, there are thousands of clones of Mrs. Danvers.

In Adrian Mole and the Weapons of Mass Destruction, Adrian refers to his current girlfriend Marigold Flowers as having the same driving force of Mrs. Danvers.

Ruth Ware's book The Death of Mrs Westaway makes reference to Mrs. Danvers, stating that she is very similar to the housekeeper in the book, Mrs. Warren.
