= Rebecca (1997 TV series) =

- Cover of the UK DVD release
- Based on: Rebecca by Daphne du Maurier
- Written by: Arthur Hopcraft
- Directed by: Jim O'Brien
- Starring: Charles Dance; Emilia Fox; Diana Rigg
- Composer: Christopher Gunning
- Countries of origin: United Kingdom; Germany
- Original language: English
- No. of series: 1
- No. of episodes: 2

Production
- Executive producers: Tim Buxton; Jonathan Powell; Rebecca Eaton; Rikolt von Gagern
- Producer: Hilary Heath
- Cinematography: Rex Maidment
- Editor: Michael Parker
- Running time: 178 minutes
- Production companies: Carlton Television; Portman Productions in association with WGBH; Tele München

Original release
- Network: ITV
- Release: 5 January – 6 January 1997

Rebecca is a 1997 British-German television drama directed by Jim O'Brien. The teleplay by Arthur Hopcraft is based on the 1938 novel of the same name by Daphne du Maurier. The serial was filmed for Carlton Television by Portman Productions in association with WGBH and Tele München.

Broadcast in the United Kingdom on 5 and 6 January 1997 on ITV, in the United States it was broadcast on 13 and 20 April of the same year on PBS, as part of Masterpiece Theatre.

== Plot ==
While vacationing in Monte Carlo in 1927, Maxim de Winter meets the young and somewhat naive British companion of Mrs. Van Hopper, a typical Ugly American whose bout of influenza frees the girl to spend time with the wealthy widower. When Mrs. Van Hopper announces plans to return to New York City, Max proposes marriage to the girl and brings her to his Cornwall coast estate, known as Manderley.

The large household staff is supervised by Mrs. Danvers, who is deeply devoted to Max's first wife, Rebecca. His young wife soon learns that Rebecca was the victim of a sailing accident some ten months before, and her battered body was discovered forty miles up the coast and identified by her distraught husband.

The new Mrs. de Winter feels overwhelmed by the vast manor, and Mrs. Danvers does nothing to put her at ease, although she finds a friend in Frank Crawley, who oversees the estate. The young bride's discomfort with her new lifestyle isn't helped because Rebecca's memory has a strong hold on Manderley and all of its inhabitants and visitors. Lacking self-confidence, she commits one faux pas after another until she is convinced Max is still deeply in love with his seemingly perfect first wife and now regrets his impetuous decision to marry her. She is also curious about a cottage on the beach and about Ben, a dimwitted scavenger who constantly assures her he has said nothing and begs her not to commit him to the asylum, references the girl doesn't understand.

Max's sister Beatrice and brother-in-law Giles convince him to revive his custom of hosting an annual costume ball at the estate. Mrs. Danvers suggests Mrs. de Winter replicate a dress worn by a family ancestor in a portrait hanging in the gallery. The girl complies, unaware that Rebecca wore the same costume to much acclaim shortly before her death. When Max sees her descend the staircase just before their guests' arrival, he furiously demands she change into a different dress.

In the early morning hours after the ball, Mrs. Danvers openly displays her contempt for the second Mrs. de Winter by taking her on a tour of Rebecca's bedroom, which she has maintained as a shrine. Showing the young girl Rebecca's wardrobe and luxurious possessions, she tells her she will never be worthy of replacing her former mistress. She encourages her to commit suicide by jumping out the window to the stone patio far below. Her manipulations are interrupted by a distress signal from a ship that has run onto the reef just off the coast.

Divers hired to investigate damage to the ship's hull discover the remains of Rebecca's boat with a body in the locked cabin. When it is raised, the body is identified as that of Rebecca by her jewelry and dress, and it is discovered that holes had been drilled deliberately in the bottom of the boat, causing it to sink.

Max confesses to his bride he strangled Rebecca in the beach cottage when she taunted him with the news that she was pregnant and that the child wasn't his. He locked her body in the cabin of her boat, sailed it offshore, drove holes into its planks, and then escaped in the dinghy, and when a body washed ashore up the coast by chance, he intentionally misidentified it. He confesses he never loved Rebecca, revealing she was an evil woman who made a mockery of their marriage by consorting with numerous men of low character in a flat she kept in London and the cottage she maintained on the beach specifically for her many trysts. She intended to raise the child as his own and make his life a misery.

A subsequent inquest concludes with a verdict of suicide, but Rebecca's cousin Jack Favell is unconvinced. He has a note from Rebecca urging him to join her at the beach cottage on the night she died because she had something important to tell him. Jack reveals he was Rebecca's lover and suspects she was pregnant with his child, causing Max to kill her in a jealous rage. He attempts to blackmail Max, who refuses his demands.

A notation in Rebecca's appointment book leads them to a doctor she visited on the day she died. He reveals that Rebecca had cancer and had only months to live, thus supporting the verdict of suicide. Max realizes she intentionally misled him into believing she was expecting another man's child to spur him to kill her in a murderous rage.

Upon returning to Manderley, Max and his wife discover the estate is in flames, the fire set by a vengeful and despairing Mrs. Danvers, who it's fairly clear now was in love with Rebecca. Max races upstairs to rescue the insane woman from Rebecca's bedroom. Though he manages to make it to the bedroom and retrieve her, he stumbles on the way back down; Mrs. Danvers' fate is unclear.

In an epilogue set ten years later, Max walks with a limp and is scarred slightly due to his heroic action. For unrevealed reasons, they can never have children. Having lost Manderley and choosing not to rebuild it, Mr. and Mrs. de Winter now live a quiet life in a small hotel, seemingly free of Rebecca's hold.

== Cast ==
- Charles Dance as Maxim de Winter
- Emilia Fox as Mrs de Winter
- Lucy Cohu as Rebecca de Winter
- Diana Rigg as Mrs Danvers
- Geraldine James as Beatrice
- Denis Lill as Giles
- Tom Chadbon as Frank Crawley
- Jonathan Cake as Jack Favell
- Faye Dunaway as Mrs Van Hopper
- Timothy West as Dr Baker

== Production ==
In the 1940 film adaptation of the Du Maurier novel directed by Alfred Hitchcock, the character of Rebecca is never seen. In the drama, she is shown from behind, and there are frequent flashes of her eyes and mouth (courtesy of Lucy Cohu), although her full face is only shown from a distance.

The second Mrs. de Winter is played by Emilia Fox, the daughter of actress Joanna David, who played the same role in the 1979 BBC production of the story.

The serial was filmed on location in Charlestown in Cornwall, the Luton Hoo Estate in Bedfordshire, Montacute House, South Somerset, and Rotherfield Park in Hampshire. Beach scenes were filmed at Mothecombe in Devon. Interiors were shot at Shepperton Studios.

== Reception ==
=== Awards ===
Diana Rigg won the Emmy Award for Outstanding Supporting Actress in a Miniseries or Movie.
