= Kristin Scott Thomas =

English actress (born 1960)

Dame Kristin Scott Thomas DBE
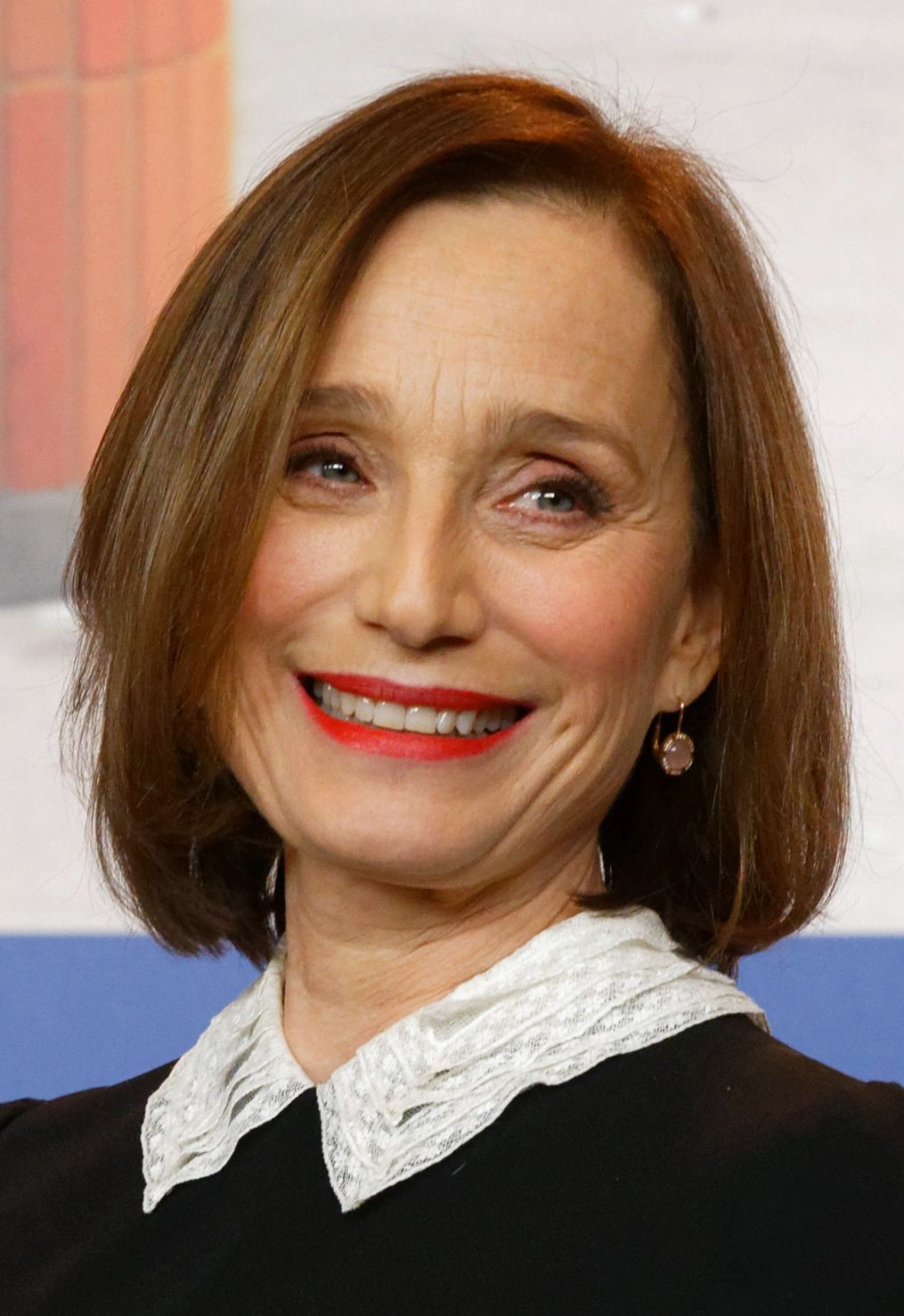
- Scott Thomas in 2017
- Born: Kristin Ann Scott Thomas; 24 May 1960 (age 66); Redruth, Cornwall, England
- Citizenship: United Kingdom • France
- Education: Royal Central School of Speech and Drama; École nationale supérieure des arts et techniques du théâtre
- Occupation: Actress
- Years active: 1984–present
- Spouse(s): François Olivennes (m. 1987; div. 2005) John Micklethwait (m. 2024)
- Children: 3
- Relatives: Serena Scott Thomas (sister)

Dame Kristin Ann Scott Thomas (born 24 May 1960) is an English actress. She has received various accolades including a BAFTA Award and an Olivier Award, as well as nominations for an Academy Award, three César Awards, a Primetime Emmy Award and two Golden Globe Awards. She was appointed Officer of the Order of the British Empire (OBE) in the 2003 and Dame Commander of the Order of the British Empire (DBE) in the 2015 New Year Honours List for services to drama. She was named a Chevalier of the Légion d'honneur by the French government in 2005.

Scott Thomas made her film debut in Under the Cherry Moon (1986), She won the BAFTA Award for Best Actress in a Supporting Role for Four Weddings and a Funeral (1994) and was nominated for the Academy Award for Best Actress in The English Patient (1996). She won the European Film Award for Best Actress for Philippe Claudel's I've Loved You So Long (2008). She has also acted in A Handful of Dust (1988), Bitter Moon (1992), Mission: Impossible (1996), The Horse Whisperer (1998), Gosford Park (2001), The Valet (2006), Tell No One (2007), Leaving (2009), Sarah's Key (2010), Nowhere Boy (2010), The Woman in the Fifth (2011), Only God Forgives (2013), Darkest Hour (2017), and Tomb Raider (2018).

On television, she was nominated for a Primetime Emmy Award for her guest role in the comedy series Fleabag (2019), and has starred in the Apple TV+ spy series Slow Horses since 2022. On stage, she won the Olivier Award for Best Actress for the Royal Court revival of The Seagull (2008).

== Early life ==
Scott Thomas was born in Redruth, Cornwall. Her mother, Deborah (née Hurlbatt), was brought up in Hong Kong and Africa, and studied drama before marrying Kristin's father, Lieutenant Commander Simon Scott Thomas, a pilot in the Royal Navy's Fleet Air Arm 893 Squadron, who died in a flying accident on a de Havilland Sea Vixen when Kristin was aged five. She has three siblings, including Serena Scott Thomas. She is the niece of Admiral Sir Richard Thomas (a former Black Rod), the granddaughter of William Scott Thomas (who commanded HMS Impulsive during World War II) and the great-great-niece of the polar explorer Captain Robert Falcon Scott.

The childhood home of Scott Thomas was in Trent, near Sherborne, Dorset, England. Her mother remarried another Royal Navy pilot, Lieutenant Commander Simon Idiens (of Simon's Sircus aerobatic team flying Sea Vixens), who also died in a flying accident whilst flying a Phantom FG1 from RNAS Yeovilton off the North coast of Cornwall in January 1972. Scott Thomas was educated at Cheltenham Ladies' College and St Antony's Leweston in Sherborne, Dorset.

On leaving school in 1978, she moved to Hampstead, London, and worked in a department store. She began training to become a drama teacher at the Central School of Speech and Drama, enrolling on a BEd in Speech and Drama. During her time at the school, she requested to switch degree courses to acting but was refused. After a year at Central, speaking French fluently, she decided to move to Paris to work as an au pair, and studied acting at the École nationale supérieure des arts et techniques du théâtre (ENSATT). When she was 25, she was cast as Mary Sharon in the film Under the Cherry Moon (1986).

== Career ==
=== 1986–1999: Early roles and breakthrough ===
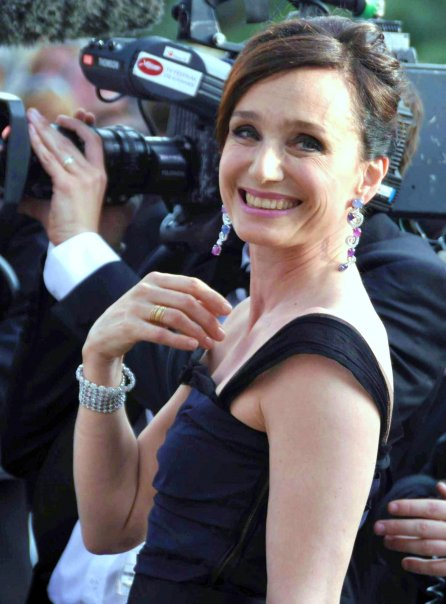
Scott Thomas at the 2009 Cannes Film Festival

Kristin Scott Thomas's acting career garnered early attention when she was cast as Mary Sharon in Under the Cherry Moon, released in 1986, the first but widely panned film directed by and starring the already well-known musical artist, Prince. Her breakthrough role was playing Brenda Last in an adaptation of Evelyn Waugh's A Handful of Dust (1988), winning her the Evening Standard British Film Award for the most promising newcomer. This was followed by roles opposite Hugh Grant in Bitter Moon and Four Weddings and a Funeral where she won a BAFTA for Best Supporting Actress.

In 1994, she starred in the Romanian–French film An Unforgettable Summer, in which she played Marie-Thérèse Von Debretsy. Rather than learn Romanian for the part, she read her lines phonetically. She had all the lines translated into French, which she speaks fluently, so she knew what she was saying. In an interview for Gloucester Citizen on 22 March 2015, she cited An Unforgettable Summer as one of the films that she is most proud of alongside The English Patient and Only God Forgives.

In the 1996 film The English Patient, her role as Katharine Clifton gained her Golden Globe and Oscar nominations as well as critical acclaim. This was followed by a brief period working in Hollywood on films such as The Horse Whisperer with Robert Redford and Random Hearts with Harrison Ford. However, growing disillusioned with Hollywood, she took a year off to give birth to her third child.

=== 2000–2009 ===
She returned to the stage in 2003 when she played the title role in a French theatre production of Racine's Bérénice, and appeared on-screen as Lady Sylvia McCordle in Robert Altman's Gosford Park. This started a critically acclaimed second career on stage, in which she has received four nominations for a Laurence Olivier Award for Best Actress, including one win, for her performance of Arkadina in a London West End production of Anton Chekhov's The Seagull. She reprised the role in New York in September 2008. In summer 2014, Scott Thomas returned to London's West End to star as Emma in Harold Pinter's Betrayal at the Comedy Theatre. The revival was directed by Ian Rickson. Her husband was played by Ben Miles and the love triangle was completed by Douglas Henshall. In January 2013, she starred in another Pinter play, Old Times, again directed by Ian Rickson. In 2014, she appeared at The Old Vic in the title role of Sophocles's Electra.

Scott Thomas has also acted in French films. In 2006, she played the role of Hélène, in French, in Ne le dis à personne (Tell No One), by French director Guillaume Canet. In 2008, Scott Thomas received many accolades for her performance in Il y a longtemps que je t'aime (I've Loved You So Long), including BAFTA and Golden Globe nominations for Best Actress. In 2009 she played the role of a wife who leaves her husband for another man in Leaving.

=== 2010–present ===
In Sarah's Key (2010) – the story of the Vel' d'Hiv Roundup – Scott Thomas starred as an American journalist in Paris who discovers that the flat her husband is renovating for them was once the home of an evicted Jewish family. Other roles include Elizabeth Boleyn, Countess of Wiltshire and Ormond, mother of Henry VIII's second wife Anne, in The Other Boleyn Girl (2008), the role of a fashion magazine creator and editor in the film Confessions of a Shopaholic (2009), and as a love interest of George Duroy (played by Robert Pattinson) in the 2012 film Bel Ami, based on the 1885 Maupassant novel.

She was also seen in The Woman in the Fifth (2011), a film adaptation of Douglas Kennedy's novel of the same name, Lasse Hallström's Salmon Fishing in the Yemen (2011), Ralph Fiennes's The Invisible Woman (2013), Philippe Claudel's Before the Winter Chill (2013), and in Nicolas Winding Refn's Only God Forgives, which premiered at the 2013 Cannes Film Festival. In 2014, she voiced the narration of Kay Summersby, General Eisenhower's driver, in the documentary series D-Day Sacrifice. She appeared in Israel Horovitz's My Old Lady (2014) and Suite Française, the 2015 film adaptation of Irène Némirovsky's World War II novel directed by Saul Dibb. In 2017 she was nominated for the BAFTA Award for Best Actress in a Supporting Role at the 71st British Academy Film Awards for portraying Clementine Churchill in Joe Wright's Darkest Hour. In May 2017, it was reported that Scott Thomas had signed on to star as BMW heiress Susanne Klatten in the thriller Paramour, directed by Alexandra-Therese Keining.

In 2020, Scott Thomas played Mrs. Danvers in director Ben Wheatley's adaptation of Daphne du Maurier's Gothic romance Rebecca, with Armie Hammer and Lily James. Also that year, she appeared in the BBC television remake of Alan Bennett's monologue series, Talking Heads, playing the role of Celia in the episode "Hand of God". In April 2022, Scott Thomas starred in the British spy thriller series Slow Horses, based on the Slough House series of novels by Mick Herron. She appeared as Diana Taverner, Deputy Director General of MI5. Premiering on Apple TV+, the series was renewed in January 2024 for a fifth season. In June 2022, Scott Thomas began filming on her directorial debut, My Mother's Wedding, starring Scarlett Johansson, Sienna Miller, Emily Beecham, and Freida Pinto.

In the lead-up to the 2026 Christmas shopping campaign, Scott Thomas starred in the John Lewis advert as grandmother "Gloria", with the Saatchi & Saatchi production drawing some media criticism; The Guardian's unflattering review alluded to the advert's "darker" content.

== Personal life ==
From 1987 until 2005, she was married to French obstetrician François Olivennes, with whom she has three children.

Scott Thomas brought up her children in Paris and has said she sometimes considers herself more French than British.

In September 2024, Scott Thomas married John Micklethwait, the editor-in-chief of Bloomberg News, after a five-year romance.

== Acting credits ==
=== Film ===
Year	Title	Role	Notes
1985	Charly	Marie	Short film
1986	Under the Cherry Moon	Mary Sharon	
1987	Agent trouble	Julie	French language film
1988	Lounge Chair	Marie	French language film
1988	A Handful of Dust	Brenda Last	
1989	Force majeure	Katia	
1989	Bille en tête	Clara	Aka Headstrong. French language film
1990	Le bal du gouverneur	Marie Forestier	French language film
1990	The Bachelor	Sabine	
1991	Valentino! I Love You		Short film
1991	Aux yeux du monde	L'institutrice	French language film
1992	Bitter Moon	Fiona	
1994	Four Weddings and a Funeral	Fiona	
1994	An Unforgettable Summer	Marie-Thérèse von Debretsy	
1995	En mai, fais ce qu'il te plaît	Martine	
1995	The Confessional	Alfred Hitchcock's assistant	
1995	Angels & Insects	Matty Crompton	
1995	Richard III	Lady Anne of Lancaster	
1995	Les Milles	Mary-Jane Cooper	(The title refers to the Camp des Milles)
1995	The Pompatus of Love	Caroline	
1995	Plaisir d'offrir		Short film
1996	Mission: Impossible	Sarah Davies	
1996	Souvenir	Ann	
1996	Microcosmos	Narrator	English version
1996	The English Patient	Katharine Clifton	
1997	Amour et confusions	Sarah	French language film
1998	The Horse Whisperer	Annie MacLean	
1998	Sweet Revenge	Imogen Staxton-Billing	
1999	Random Hearts	Kay Chandler	
2000	Up at the Villa	Mary Panton	
2001	Play	First Woman	Short film
2001	Life as a House	Robin Monroe	
2001	Gosford Park	Sylvia McCordle	
2003	Small Cuts	Béatrice	French language film
2004	Arsène Lupin	Joséphine, comtesse de Cagliostro	French language film
2005	Man to Man	Elena van den Ende	
2005	Chromophobia	Iona Aylesbury	
2005	Keeping Mum	Gloria Goodfellow	
2006	The Valet	Christine Levasseur	French language film
2006	Tell No One	Hélène Perkins	French language film
2007	The Walker	Lynn Lockner	
2007	The Golden Compass	Stelmaria (voice)	
2008	I've Loved You So Long	Juliette	French language film
2008	The Other Boleyn Girl	Lady Elizabeth Boleyn	
2008	2 Alone in Paris	L'antiquaire	French language film
2008	Easy Virtue	Mrs. Whittaker	
2008	Largo Winch	Ann Fergusson	
2009	Confessions of a Shopaholic	Alette Naylor	
2009	Leaving	Suzanne	French language film
2009	Nowhere Boy	Mimi Smith	
2010	Love Crime	Christine	French language film
2010	Sarah's Key	Julia Jarmond	
2010	In Your Hands	Anna Cooper	French language film
2011	Salmon Fishing in the Yemen	Patricia Maxwell	
2011	The Woman in the Fifth	Margit Kadar	
2012	Bel Ami	Virginie Walters	
2012	Looking for Hortense	Iva Delusi	French language film
2012	In the House	Jeanne Germain	French language film
2013	Only God Forgives	Crystal	
2013	Before the Winter Chill	Lucie	French language film
2013	The Invisible Woman	Frances Ternan	
2014	My Old Lady	Chloé Girard	
2014	Suite Française	Madame Angellier	
2017	The Party	Janet	
2017	Darkest Hour	Clementine Churchill	
2018	Tomb Raider	Ana Miller	
2018	Au bout des doigts	Countess Elizabeth Buckingham	
2019	Military Wives	Kate	
2020	Final Set	Judith	
2020	Rebecca	Mrs. Danvers	
2022	Two Tickets to Greece (Les Cyclades)	Bijou	
2023	My Mother's Wedding	Diana	Also director and screenwriter

=== Television ===
Year	Title	Role	Notes
1984	Les enquêtes du commissaire Maigret	—N/a	Episode: "L'Ami d'enfance de Maigret"
1984	Mistral's Daughter	Nancy	Miniseries; 3 episodes
1987	Sentiments	Nathalie	Episode: "La tricheuse"
1987	Sentimental Journey	Bettina	Television film
1988	The Tenth Man	Thérèse Mangeot	Television film
1989	The Endless Game	Caroline	Miniseries; 2 episodes
1990	Spymaker: The Secret Life of Ian Fleming	Leda St Gabriel	Television film
1990	Framed	Kate	Television film
1991	Titmuss Regained	Jenny Sidonia	Miniseries; 3 episodes
1992	Look at It This Way	Victoria Rolfe	Miniseries; 3 episodes
1992	Weep No More, My Lady	Elisabeth	Television film
1993	Body & Soul	Sister Gabriel / Anna	Miniseries; 6 episodes
1995	Belle Époque	Alice Avellano	Miniseries; 3 episodes
1996	Gulliver's Travels	Immortal Gatekeeper	Miniseries; episode 2
2003	Absolutely Fabulous	Plum Berkeley	Episode: "Book Clubbin'"
2019	One Red Nose Day and a Wedding	Fiona	Television short
2019	Fleabag	Belinda Friers	Series 2, episode 3
2020	Talking Heads	Celia	Episode: "The Hand of God"
2022–present	Slow Horses	Diana Taverner	Main cast

=== Theatre ===
Year	Title	Role	Venue	Ref.
1983	La Lune déclinante sur 4 ou 5 personnes qui dansent		Festival de Semur en Auxois	
1984	Terre étrangère		Théâtre Nanterre-Amandiers	
1984	Naïves Hirondelles		Festival d'Avignon	
1985	Yes, peut-être		In a field in Burgundy	
2001	Bérénice		Festival de Perpignan and Festival d'Avignon + national tour	
2003	Three Sisters	Masha	Playhouse Theatre, London	
2005–06	As You Desire Me	Elma	Playhouse Theatre, London	
2007	The Seagull	Arkadina	Royal Court Theatre, London	
2008	The Seagull	Arkadina	Walter Kerr Theatre, New York	
2011	Betrayal	Emma	Comedy Theatre, London	
2013	Old Times	Kate/Anna	Harold Pinter Theatre, London	
2014	Electra	Electra	The Old Vic, London	
2015	The Audience	Queen Elizabeth II	Apollo Theatre, London	
2023	Lyonesse	Elaine	Harold Pinter Theatre, London	
2026	The Cherry Orchard	Ranevskaya	Harold Pinter Theatre, London	

== Awards and nominations ==
National

- Dame Commander of the Order of the British Empire (OBE, 14 June 2003; DBE, 31 December 2014).

Foreigns

- Knight of the National Order of the Legion of Honour (French Republic, 27 May 2005).
