= Sally Beauman =

English writer and journalist

- Born: Sally Vanessa Kinsey-Miles; 25 July 1944; Totnes, Devon, England
- Died: 7 July 2016 (aged 71); London, England
- Occupations: Journalist, writer
- Spouses: Christopher Beauman (m. 1966; div. 1971) Alan Howard (m. 2004; died 2015)
- Children: 1
- Writing career
- Pen name: Vanessa James
- Language: English
- Period: 1976–2016
- Genre: Fiction

Sally Vanessa Beauman (née Kinsey-Miles, 25 July 1944 – 7 July 2016) was an English journalist and writer. She was the author of eight widely translated and best-selling novels.

== Early life and career ==
Beauman was born in Totnes, Devon, England. She was educated at Redland High School in Bristol and Girton College, Cambridge.

She worked for two years as a critic and contributing editor for New York magazine, for which her first assignment was interviewing Norman Mailer. She was the first recipient of the Catherine Pakenham Award in 1970 for journalism, and at the age of 24 edited Queen magazine, also becoming the arts editor of The Sunday Telegraph Magazine. She worked as an investigative journalist, interviewer and critic for many leading publications in Britain and the US, including The New Yorker. It was an article about the work of Daphne du Maurier in this magazine that eventually led to her writing Rebecca's Tale, her companion novel to du Maurier's Rebecca.

== Writer ==
She wrote an early appreciation of Monique Wittig's second novel, Les Guérillères, in The New York Times Book Review. The book was published in France in the wake of the 1968 upheavals, but was not available to English readers until the 1971 translation.

Beauman's first work of non-fiction was The Royal Shakespeare Company's Centenary Production of Henry V (Pergamon Press, 1976), a study of the RSC's 1975 staging. In 1982, to coincide with the opening of the Barbican Theatre in London, the Oxford University Press published her study of The Royal Shakespeare Company: A History of Ten Decades (ISBN 0192122096), chronicling the turbulent history of what was to become the RSC from its first founding as a small seasonal theatre in Stratford upon Avon in 1879.

She then began to write fiction, initially writing a series of nine romance novels for Mills & Boon under the pseudonym Vanessa James. She received a record-breaking advance for her first novel, Destiny, which became an international best-seller. Her subsequent novels include Dark Angel, in which a country-house and a family is almost destroyed by the orphan child it has taken in; Rebecca's Tale and The Landscape of Love, a novel with multiple narrators that examines the post-1960's lives of three very different and antagonistic sisters.

Her novel The Visitors (2014) concerns the discovery of Tutankhamun's tomb in the Valley of the Kings in 1922, the subterfuge that attended it, and the political turmoil it caused.

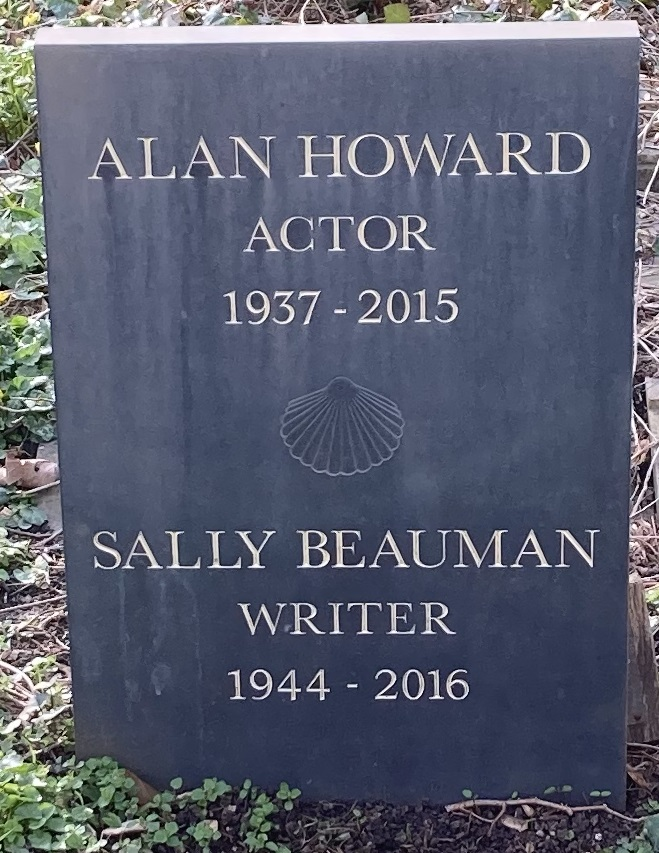
Grave of Alan Howard and Sally Beauman in Highgate Cemetery

== Personal life ==
She was first married to Christopher Beauman, an economist, from 1966 to 1971. She later married Alan Howard, the actor, whom she met in 1970 while interviewing him for The Telegraph Magazine. The couple had one son and two grandchildren. Howard died in 2015.

== Death ==
On 7 July 2016, Beauman died in her sleep at a London hospital, aged 71. She is buried with her husband on the east side of Highgate Cemetery.

== Bibliography ==
=== Non-fiction ===
- The Royal Shakespeare Company's Centenary Production of Henry V (1976)
- The Royal Shakespeare Company: A History of Ten Decades (1982)

=== Novels ===
==== As Vanessa James ====
- The Dark One (1982)
- The Fire and the Ice (1982)
- The Devil's Advocate (1983)
- Ever After (1983)
- Chance Meetings (1984)
- The Object of the Game (1985)
- Give Me This Night (1985)
- Prisoner (1986)
- Try to Remember (1986)

==== As Sally Beauman ====
- Destiny (1987)
- Dark Angel (1990)
- Lovers and Liars (1994)
- Danger Zones (1996)
- Sextet (1997)
- Rebecca's Tale (2001)
- The Landscape of Love (2005), titled The Sisters Mortland in USA
- The Visitors (2014)
