= The Landscape of Love =

2005 novel by Sally Beauman

- Author: Sally Beauman
- Language: English
- Genre: Fiction
- Publisher: Time Warner Books
- Publication date: 2005
- Publication place: Great Britain
- Media type: Print Paperback and Hardback
- Pages: 428
- ISBN: 0-7515-3687-3
- OCLC: 62477993

The Landscape of Love (The Sisters Mortland in the US edition) is a novel published by British author Sally Beauman. It tells the tale of the Mortland girls – beautiful, but cold, Julia; remote and aloof Finn; and young ‘different’ Maisie – who come with their mother, Stella, to live in their grandfather's home, a huge and ancient ruin of an abbey.

== Plot summary ==
In the summer of 1967, the family friends Dan, Nick and Lucas arrive for a visit. Dan is Finn's boyfriend; Nick is a young doctor; and Lucas is a non-conformist fame-hungry artist and disregards others.

Lucas is painting the girls' portraits. When he works on Maisie, she entertains him with tales of the family's past. However, when Maisie tells of having her fortune told years ago, he scoffs and so she doesn't tell him what she saw in the fortune teller's crystal ball.

As the family begins to prepare to travel to Gramps's childhood home for their annual visit, their place is enveloped in a brooding sense of impending doom. Maisie (who wanders at night) spies Finn returning home very early in the morning, naked under her dress. Maisie worries that Dan's heart will be broken if Finn has been with Lucas, as she suspects.

Before the family leaves on their trip, Stella and her father work on their plan to ask Gramps's wealthy twin brother for a loan to repair the crumbling Abbey. Maisie slips away, spying Lucas furtively leaving for Cambridge on Julia's bike. She wonders if he has stolen it. Maisie then overhears a passionate argument between Dan and Finn, followed by an equally passionate embrace. The house is filled with fear, distrust and despair. Maisie doesn't know what is wrong with her family but decides she must take action to help them.

As usual Gramps's brother rebuffs the family's request for a loan, spurred on by his wife Violet ‘the Viper’. However, Maisie acquires money through surprising means. During this transaction she learns that her family fears she will turn out like her deceased father. She does not understand, what does it mean?

The story skips more than twenty years later to 1989, and, rather than being a continuation of Maisie’s tale, it is Dan who is narrating.

The sense of impending doom turns to suspenseful mystery as Dan reflects back on a tragedy that occurred during the summer of 1967 involving the Mortland family. Lucas is now a celebrated artist planning to show his 1967 portrait, The Sisters Mortland, at a retrospective. Dan is horrified at the thought of stirring up the family tragedy and sorrow. At this, it is learnt that Maisie was the cause of the tragedy, as she had jumped out of a window. It is also learnt by the reader, that Maisie was possibly autistic, though it is not explained clearly.

Dan's life is also something of a tragedy. His job as a producer of commercials ends, his father dies, and he exists in a drug-blurred depression. The current focus of his life is the tragic puzzle of the Mortland event that occurred during that long past summer.

Where did it all go wrong? Why did it happen? And how did he lose the love of his life?
