= Tony Britton =

English actor (1924–2019)

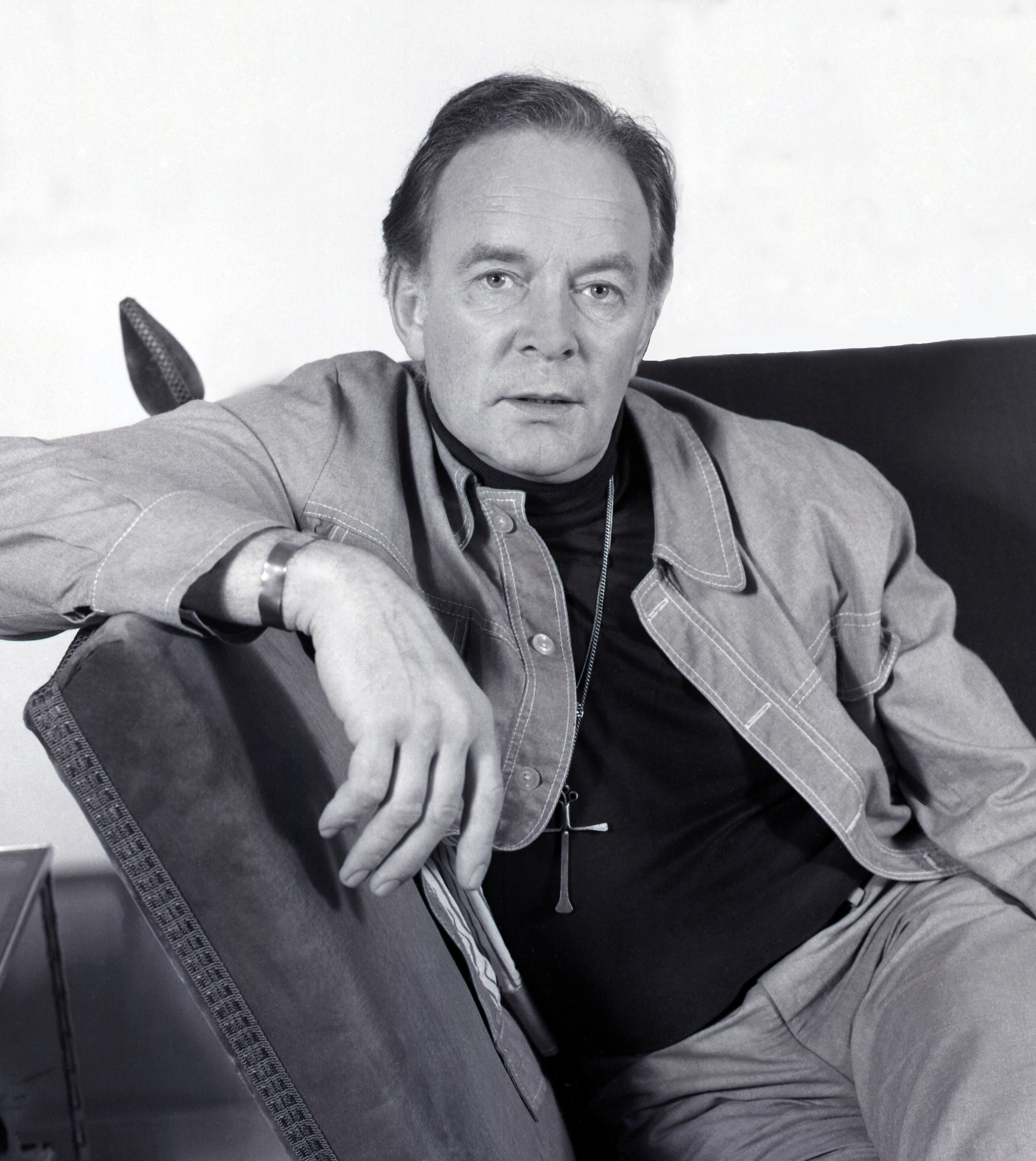
- Portrait taken by Allan Warren in 1972
- Born: Anthony Edward Lowry Britton; 9 June 1924; Birmingham, England
- Died: 22 December 2019 (aged 95); London, England
- Years active: 1950–2013
- Spouses: Ruth Hawkins (m. 1948; div. 1961) Eva Castle (m. 1962; died 2008)
- Children: Fern Britton; Jasper Britton; Cherry Britton
- Awards: Broadcasting Press Guild Award for Best Actor; 1975 The Nearly Man

Anthony Edward Lowry Britton (9 June 1924 – 22 December 2019) was an English actor. He appeared in a variety of films (including The Day of the Jackal) and television sitcoms (including Don't Wait Up and Robin's Nest).

== Background ==
Britton was born in Erdington, Birmingham, the son of Doris Marguerite (née Jones) and Edward Leslie Britton. His father was landlord of the Trocadero public house on Temple Street in Birmingham. He attended Edgbaston Collegiate School, Birmingham and Thornbury Grammar School, Gloucestershire. During the Second World War he served in the Army and he also worked for an estate agent and in an aircraft factory. He joined an amateur dramatics group in Weston-super-Mare and then turned professional, appearing on stage at the Old Vic and with the Royal Shakespeare Company.

== Career ==
He appeared in numerous British films from the 1950s onwards, including Operation Amsterdam (1959), Sunday Bloody Sunday (1971) and The Day of the Jackal (1973). Britton won the Broadcasting Press Guild Award for Best Actor and was nominated for the British Academy Television Award for Best Actor in 1975 for The Nearly Man.

Britton was under contract to the Rank Organisation in the late 1950s who put him in a series of films.

He was the subject of This Is Your Life in 1977 when he was surprised by Eamonn Andrews outside London's Cafe Royal.

In 1979, Britton was nominated for the Laurence Olivier Award for Best Actor in a Musical for playing Henry Higgins in My Fair Lady at the Adelphi Theatre.

From 1983 to 1990, he starred with Nigel Havers and Dinah Sheridan in the BBC sitcom Don't Wait Up, which became a highlight of his career. His other sitcom appearances included ...And Mother Makes Five, Father, Dear Father and as James Nicholls in Robin's Nest. Britton recorded many audiobook versions of novels by Dick Francis.

In September 2013 Sir Jonathan Miller directed a Gala Performance of William Shakespeare's King Lear at the Old Vic in London. Britton played the Earl of Gloucester.

== Personal life ==
Britton and his first wife Ruth (née Hawkins), to whom he was married from 1948 to 1961, they had two children, scriptwriter Cherry Britton and TV presenter Fern Britton.

In 1962, Britton married Danish sculptor and wartime Danish resistance member Eva Castle Britton (née Skytte Birkfeldt). They had one son, actor Jasper Britton.

Britton lived in Fiddington, Somerset, in his later years. He died in the London Borough of Hillingdon on 22 December 2019, at the age of 95.

== Films ==
- Waterfront (1950) as Deck-Hand (uncredited)
- Cage of Gold (1950) as Nicky (uncredited)
- Salute the Toff (1952) as Draycott
- The Man who Stroked Cats (1955) as Tom Meredith ( Dir. by Anthony Pelissier with Peggy Anne Clifford) (short)
- Loser Takes All (1956) as Tony
- The Birthday Present (1957) as Simon Scott
- Behind the Mask (1958) as Philip Selwood
- The Heart of a Man (1959) as Tony Carlisle
- Operation Amsterdam (1959) as Major Dillon
- The Rough and the Smooth (1959) as Mike Thompson
- The Last Winter (1960) as Stephen Burton
- Suspect (1960) as Robert Marriott
- The Break (1963) as Greg Parker
- Dr. Syn Alias the Scarecrow (1963) as Simon Bates
- There's a Girl in My Soup (1970) as Andrew Hunter
- Sunday Bloody Sunday (1971) as George Harding
- Mr. Forbush and the Penguins (1971) as George Dewport
- The Day of the Jackal (1973) as Superintendent Brian Thomas
- Night Watch (1973) as Tony
- The People That Time Forgot (1977) as Captain Lawton
- Agatha (1979) as William Collins
- Countdown to War (1989) as Sir Nevile Henderson
- Run for Your Wife (2012) as Man on Bus (final film role)

== Television ==
- Melissa (1964)
- The Saint (1968)
- Marked Personal (1974)
- The Nearly Man (1975)
- ...And Mother Makes Five (1975)
- Robin's Nest (1977–1981)
- Don't Wait Up (1983–1990)
- Strangers and Brothers (1984)
- Don't Tell Father (1992)
- The Royal (2006)
