= The Nearly Man =

1974 British television series

- Genre: Drama
- Created by: Arthur Hopcraft
- Starring: Tony Britton; Ann Firbank
- Country of origin: United Kingdom
- Original language: English
- No. of series: 1
- No. of episodes: 8

Production
- Producer: Jonathan Powell
- Running time: 60 minutes
- Production company: Granada Television

Original release
- Network: ITV
- Release: 4 August 1974 – 16 December 1975

The Nearly Man is a British television play and series from the mid-1970s, about a middle-class Labour MP. Both play and series were written by Arthur Hopcraft; actors in the cast of both include Tony Britton in the title role, Wilfred Pickles, Ann Firbank and Michael Elphick.

The play was originally screened on ITV on 4 August 1974, and won the Broadcasting Press Guild award for the best single play on British television that year. The series was filmed in London by Granada Television, and broadcast late the following year. Some episodes were directed by British directors Alan Grint and John Irvin.
