= François Olivennes =

French physician (born 1959)

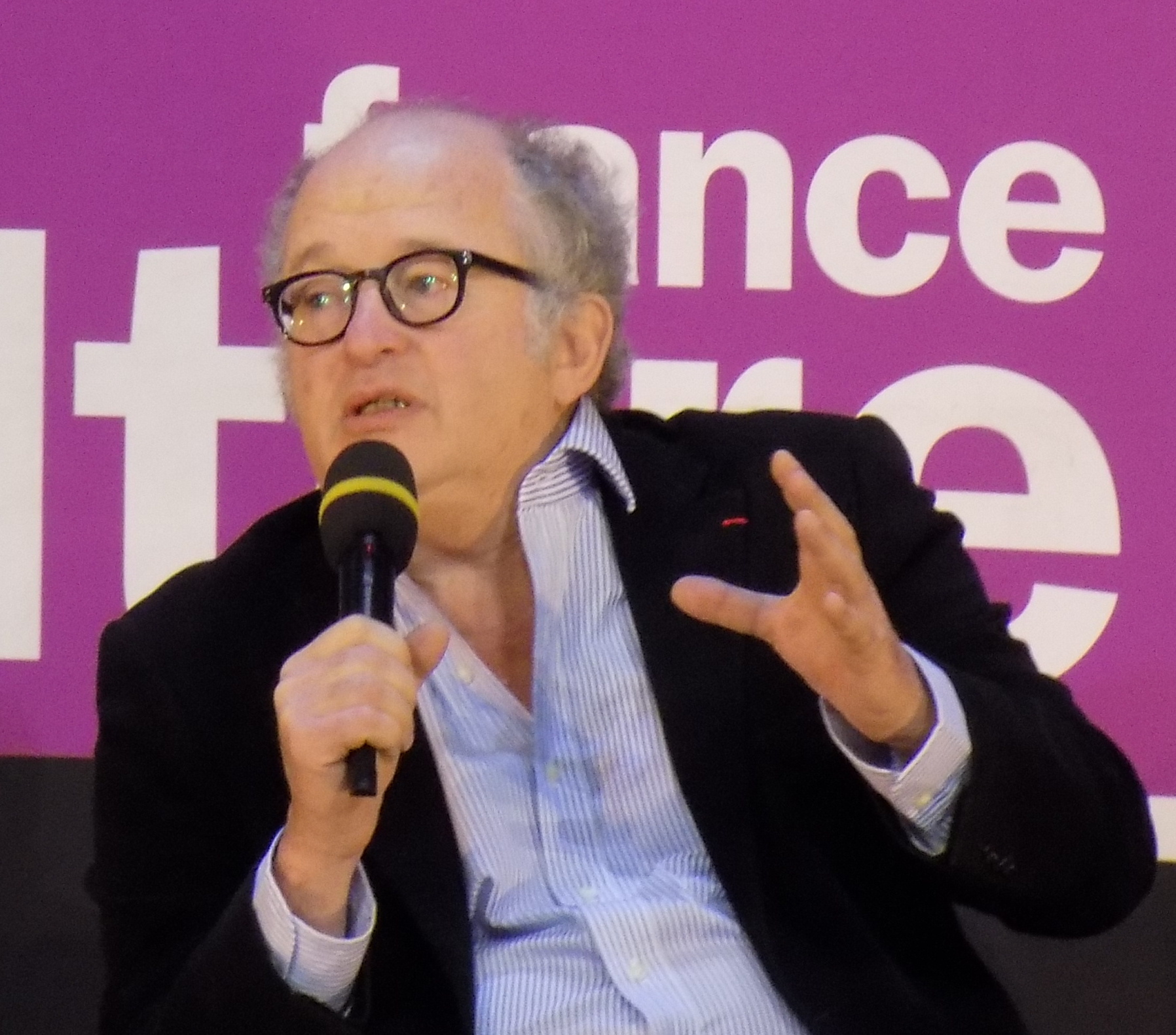
- Born: 4 January 1959 (age 67); Boulogne-Billancourt, France
- Occupation: Physician
- Spouse: Kristin Scott Thomas (m. 1987; div. 2005)
- Children: 3
- Parents: Armand Olivennes (fr) (father); Maria Landau (mother)
- Relatives: Denis Olivennes (fr) (brother)

François Olivennes (born 4 January 1959) is a French obstetrician and gynaecologist specialising in in vitro fertilization (IVF) and reproductive medicine.

== Early life ==
François Olivennes grew up in Paris. He is the son of psychiatrist and child psychoanalyst Maria Landau, and psychiatrist turned poet Armand Olivennes. He is the eldest of three. Both of his younger brothers, Denis Olivennes and Frédéric Olivennes work in the French media industry.

== Career ==
François Olivennes graduated from French Medical school in 1985. In 1992, he became medical director in the public hospital IVF units of the Béclère Hospital in Clamart until 2002 when he left for the Cochin hospital in Paris. He has a PhD in Biology of Reproduction and was appointed as Professor in Biology of Reproduction in 2000. He has been an invited speaker in more than 150 international meetings.

In 2006, he left the public hospital system and opened a private practice in Paris' 17th arrondissement. He is also the general team co-ordinator at the IVF centre Eylau la Muette.

== Published work ==
=== Journals ===
Olivennes is the author or co-author of more than 150 scientific papers published in peer-reviewed journals. He was a member of the executive committee of ESHRE and has been on the editorial board of Fertility and Sterility and RBM online.

=== Books ===
Olivennes has written and edited several books in the field of Assisted Reproductive Technology. His books for the general public include:

- N’attendez pas trop longtemps pour faire un enfant (Don't wait too long to have a child), with Laurence Beauvillard. Odile Jacob (2010)
- Tout ce qu’il faut savoir avant une grossesse (Everything you need to know before getting pregnant), with Laurence Beauvillard. Marabout (2011)
- Tout ce que les femmes ont toujours voulu savoir sur le sexe et ont osé demander (Everything women always wanted to know about sex and finally dared to ask), with Sophie Bramly. Fayard (2012)
- Faire un enfant au 21ème siècle (Having a child in the 21st century), Groupe Flammarion (2013)

== Personal life ==
Olivennes married English actress Kristin Scott Thomas in 1987 and had three children, Hannah (born 1988), Joseph (born 1991), and George (born 2000). The couple divorced in 2005. He currently lives in Paris.

In 2011, French President Nicolas Sarkozy personally awarded him the Légion d'Honneur for his work in the medical field.
