= Arthur Hopcraft =

British screenwriter and journalist (1932–2004)

- Born: 30 November 1932; Shoeburyness, Essex, England
- Died: 22 November 2004 (aged 71)
- Occupations: Screenwriter; journalist
- Writing career
- Notable awards: BAFTA Writers Award (1986)

Arthur Hopcraft (30 November 1932 – 22 November 2004) was a British screenwriter, well known for his TV plays such as The Nearly Man, and for his small-screen adaptations such as Tinker Tailor Soldier Spy; Hard Times, Bleak House, and Rebecca. Before taking up writing for TV, he was a sports journalist for The Guardian and The Observer, writing The Football Man: People and Passions in Soccer. He also had four other books published, including an autobiographical account of his childhood, and wrote the screenplay for the film Hostage. Hopcraft won the BAFTA Writers Award in 1986.

== Career ==
Hopcraft was born in Shoeburyness, Essex. He soon moved to Cannock, Staffordshire, and as a teen, he started working at local newspapers. By the age of 17, he was reporting on the Stafford Rangers' semi-professional football games using the pseudonym "Linesman." After his service in the military, he worked at the Daily Mirror in Manchester and then The Guardian. He had assignments in west Africa, India and Brazil. In the mid-1960s, he began doing football writing at The Observer as well. From January 1968 he was a regular contributor to the IPC monthly Nova, his articles were mostly stories from his own life.

He was a "self-described loner whose claustrophobia extended to refusing to use the London Underground." He never married, noting that "I tried both sexes, but ended up wishing they would all just go away".
