= Rebecca (1979 TV series) =

- Based on: Rebecca (novel)
- Directed by: Simon Langton
- Starring: Jeremy Brett; Joanna David
- No. of episodes: 4

Original release
- Network: BBC One
- Release: 17 January – 7 February 1979

Rebecca is a 1979 BBC Television drama, directed by Simon Langton. It is based on Daphne du Maurier's 1938 British novel Rebecca. Four 55-minute episodes were produced and aired on BBC1.

== Cast ==
- Jeremy Brett as Maxim de Winter
- Joanna David as The Second Mrs. de Winter
- Anna Massey as Mrs. Danvers
- Hugh Morton as Frith
- Richard Willis as Robert
- Terrence Hardiman as Frank Crawley
- Vivian Pickles as Beatrice
- Leon Sinden as Giles
- Julian Holloway as Jack Favell

== Locations ==
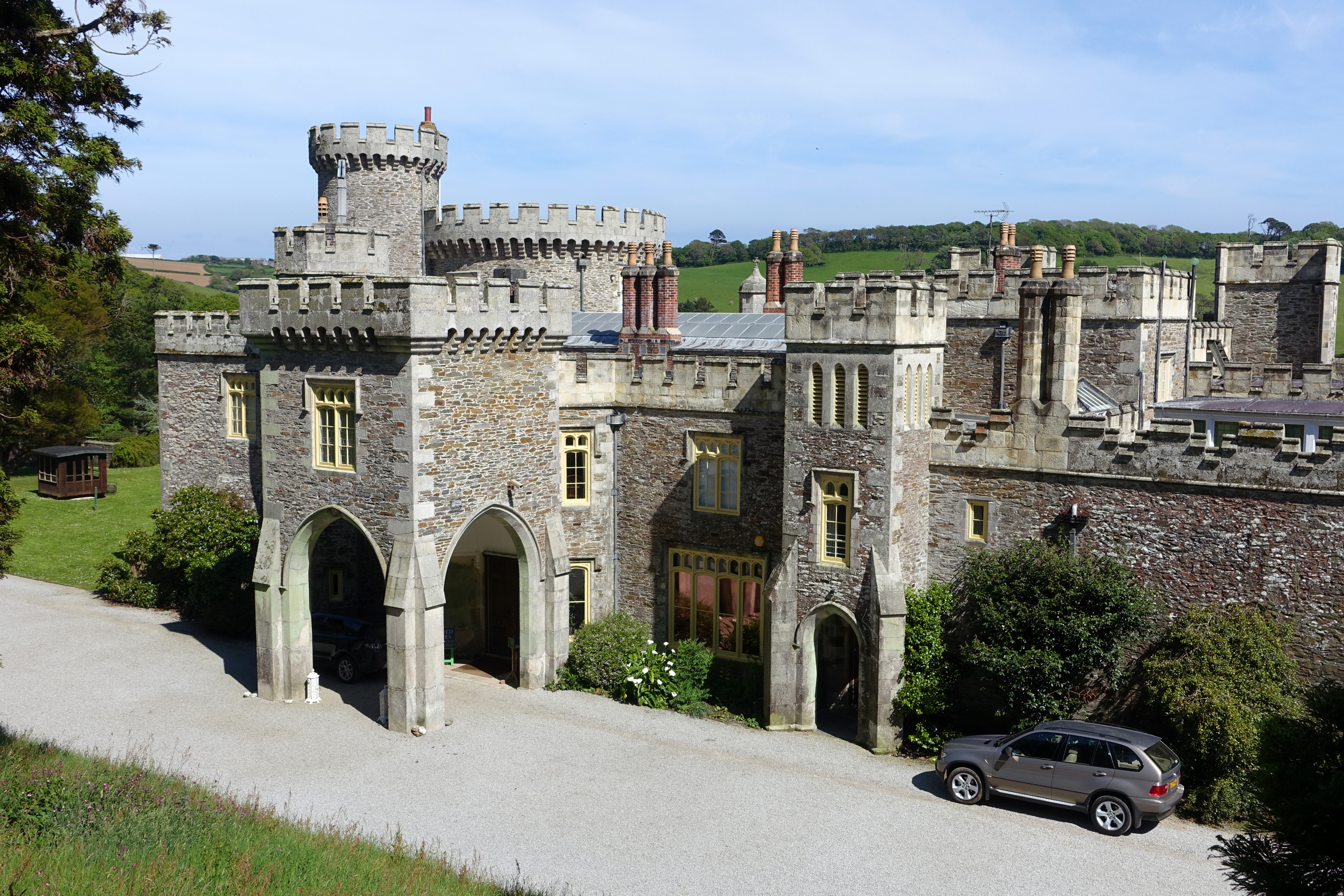
Caerhayes Castle

Caerhays Castle doubled as Manderley in this series. The beach scenes were filmed at Porthluney Cove.
