= Rebecca (1940 film) =

1940 film by Alfred Hitchcock

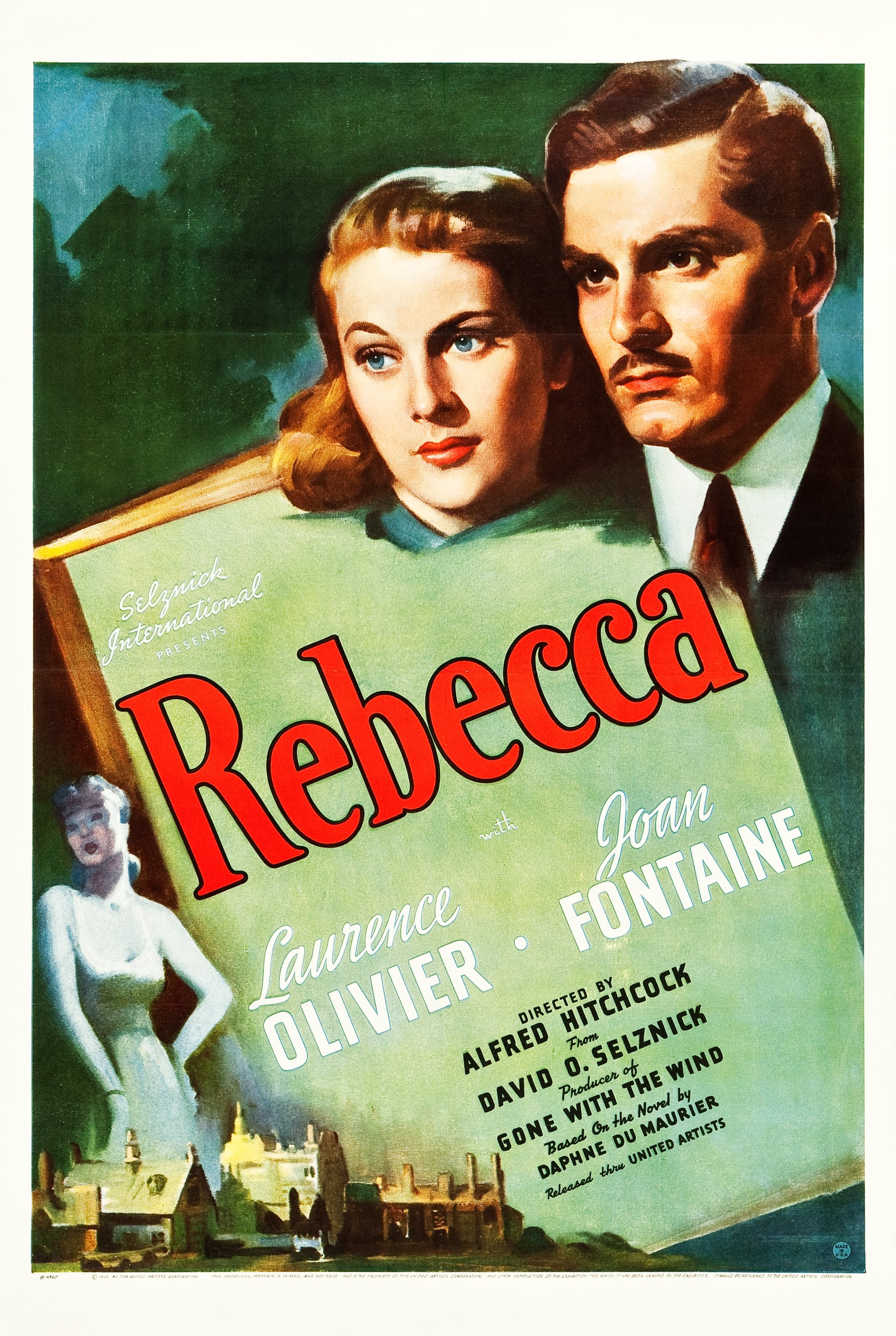
- Theatrical release poster
- Directed by: Alfred Hitchcock
- Screenplay by: Robert E. Sherwood; Joan Harrison
- Adaptation by: Philip MacDonald; Michael Hogan
- Based on: Rebecca by Daphne du Maurier
- Produced by: David O. Selznick
- Starring: Laurence Olivier; Joan Fontaine; Judith Anderson; George Sanders; Reginald Denny; Gladys Cooper; C. Aubrey Smith
- Cinematography: George Barnes
- Edited by: Hal C. Kern; James E. Newcom
- Music by: Franz Waxman
- Production company: Selznick International Pictures
- Distributed by: United Artists
- Release dates: March 21, 1940 (Miami); April 12, 1940 (United States)
- Running time: 130 minutes
- Country: United States
- Language: English
- Budget: $1.29 million
- Box office: $6 million

Rebecca is a 1940 American romantic psychological thriller film directed by Alfred Hitchcock. It was Hitchcock's first American project, and his first film under contract with producer David O. Selznick. The screenplay by Robert E. Sherwood and Joan Harrison, and adaptation by Philip MacDonald and Michael Hogan, were based on the 1938 novel of the same name by Daphne du Maurier.

The film stars Laurence Olivier as the brooding, aristocratic widower Maxim de Winter and Joan Fontaine as the young, never-named woman who becomes his second wife, with Judith Anderson, George Sanders and Gladys Cooper in supporting roles. The film is a gothic tale shot in black-and-white. Maxim de Winter's first wife Rebecca, who died before the events of the film, is never seen. Her reputation and recollections of her, however, are a constant presence in the lives of Maxim, his new wife and the housekeeper, Mrs. Danvers.

Rebecca was theatrically released on April 12, 1940, to critical and commercial success. It received eleven nominations at the 13th Academy Awards, more than any other film that year. It won two awards: Best Picture and Best Cinematography, becoming the only film directed by Hitchcock to win the former award. In 2018, the film was selected for preservation in the United States National Film Registry by the Library of Congress as being "culturally, historically, or aesthetically significant".

== Plot ==
Trailer for Rebecca

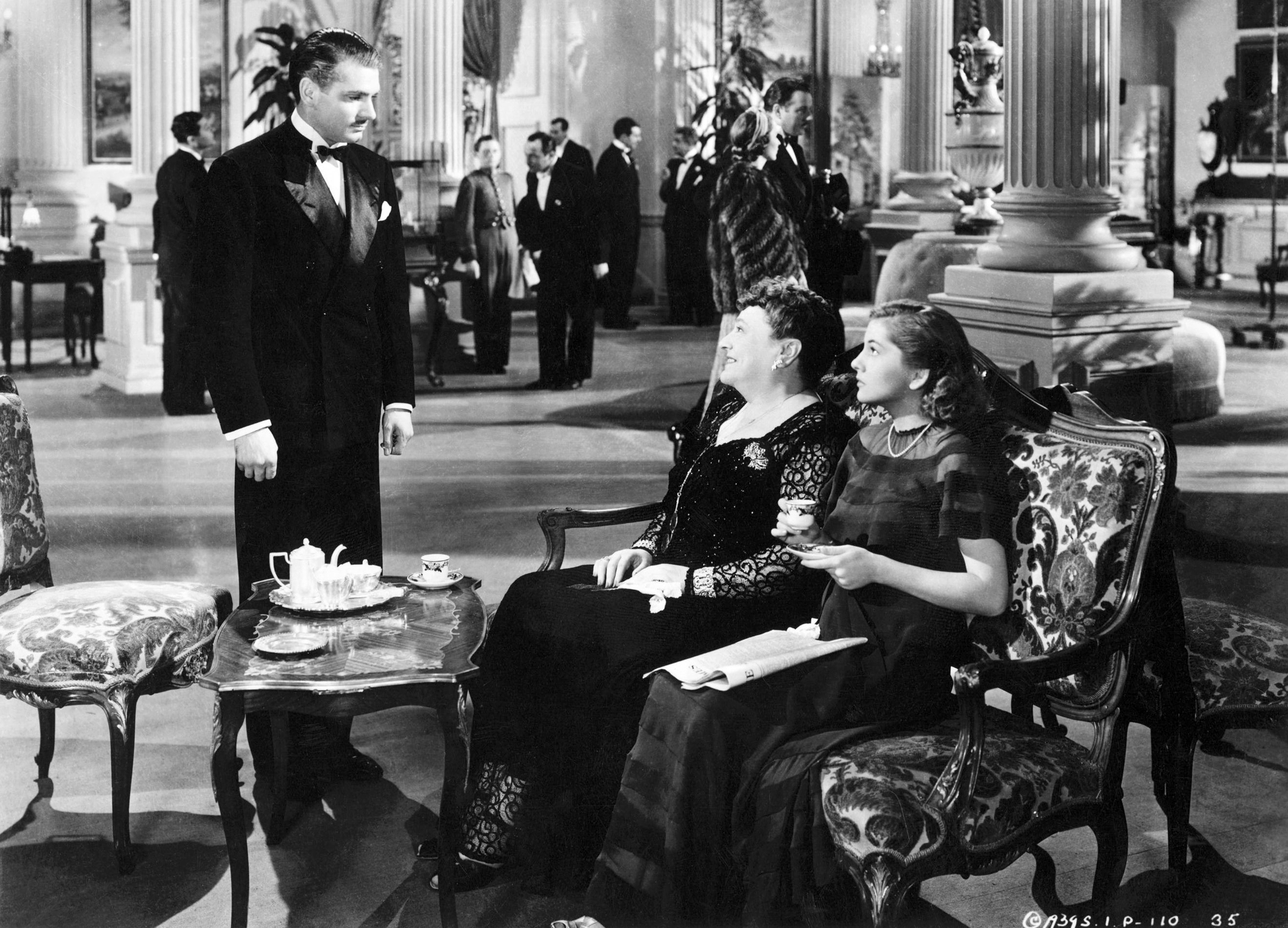
In Monte Carlo, Maxim de Winter (Laurence Olivier) stops to speak to Mrs. Edythe Van Hopper (Florence Bates) only after recognizing her companion (Joan Fontaine), the woman he had encountered earlier.

On the French Riviera, Maxim de Winter stands at a cliff edge, seemingly contemplating suicide. A young woman shouts at him to stop him in his tracks, but he curtly asks her to walk on.

Later, at a Monte Carlo hotel, the same young woman, serving as a paid companion to the pompous, elderly Mrs. Van Hopper, again encounters the debonair widower de Winter. Aspiring to social prominence, Mrs. Van Hopper is obsequious to the aristocratic de Winter, but is soon confined to her room due to illness. Maxim invites the companion on excursions, which she conceals from her employer. The young woman soon becomes infatuated, though puzzled by Maxim's attention. Upon her recovery, Mrs. Van Hopper decides to leave Monte Carlo; her companion furtively informs Maxim of her departure, and he unexpectedly proposes marriage. After being informed of the proposal by Maxim, a shocked Mrs. Van Hopper privately tells her companion that Maxim is marrying her as a desperate distraction, because he is still tormented by thoughts of his beloved dead wife, Rebecca. She asserts that her companion is ill-prepared to be the second Mrs. de Winter and cannot hope to succeed as the mistress of the stately Manderley.

Maxim brings his new bride back to Manderley, his grand mansion by the sea in Cornwall. Manderley is dominated by its austere housekeeper, Mrs. Danvers, a cold and unyielding woman, a confidante of the first Mrs. de Winter. Danvers harbors deep resentment for the new Mrs. de Winter, whom she views as a usurper. Danvers feeds the bride's insecurity by showing her Rebecca's lavish bedroom suite, left untouched and denied to the new wife, and by retaining items throughout the house with Rebecca's monogram.

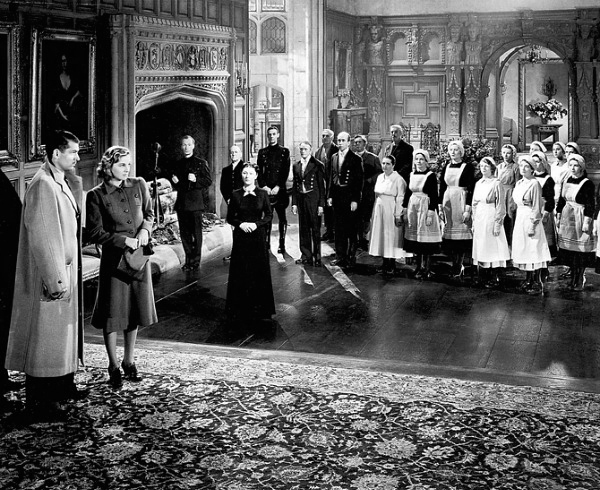
The new Mrs. de Winter is intimidated by the grandeur of Manderley and its staff.

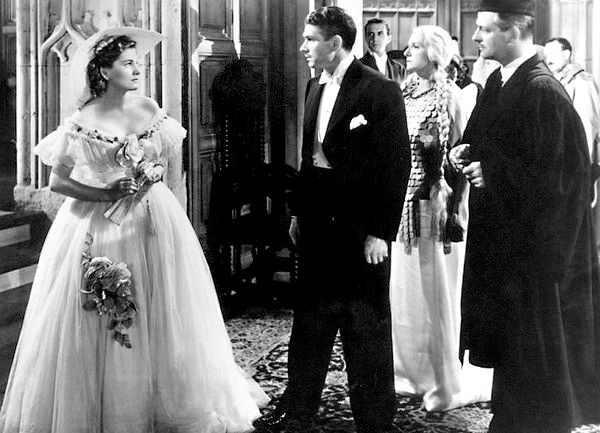
Danvers tricks the insecure second Mrs. de Winter into wearing the same costume Rebecca wore at her last costume ball.

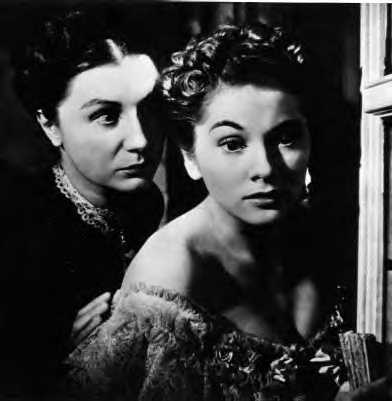
Danvers tries to convince the dispirited second Mrs. de Winter to end a hopeless marriage by jumping out a window to her death.

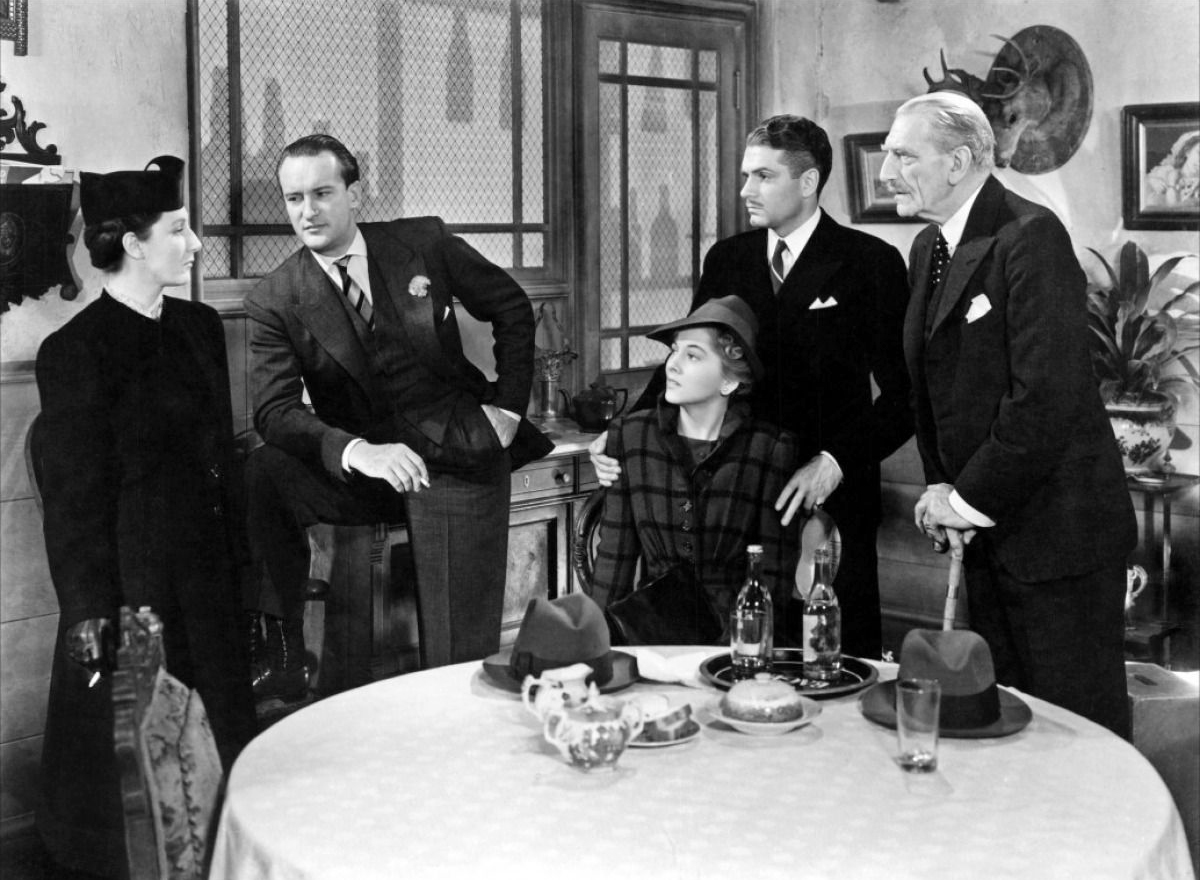
Mrs. Danvers is questioned by Jack Favell during a break in the inquest proceedings into Rebecca's death.

Eventually, constant reminders of Rebecca's glamour and sophistication convince the new Mrs. de Winter that Maxim is still in love with his tragically drowned first wife, which could explain his restlessness and irrational outbursts of anger. She tries to assert her new role by holding a costume party as Maxim and Rebecca had done annually. Danvers suggests she copy the dress that one of Maxim's ancestors is seen wearing in a portrait. However, when she appears in the costume, Maxim is appalled as Rebecca had worn an identical dress at her last ball, just before her death.

When Mrs. de Winter confronts Danvers about this, Danvers tells her she can never take Rebecca's place and tries to persuade her to jump to her death from the second-story window of Rebecca's room. At that moment, however, the alarm is raised because a ship has run aground due to the fog and, during the rescue of its crew, a sunken boat with Rebecca's body in it has been discovered.

Maxim now confesses to his new wife that his first marriage had been a sham from the start. Rebecca had declared that she had no intention of keeping to her vows but would pretend to be the perfect wife and hostess for the sake of appearances. When Rebecca implied she was pregnant by her cousin and lover, Jack Favell, she taunted Maxim that the estate might pass to someone other than Maxim's line. During a heated argument, Rebecca fell, struck her head, and died. Afraid he would be blamed for her death, Maxim took the body out in a boat which he then scuttled; some days later, he identified another body that washed ashore as Rebecca's.

The crisis causes the second Mrs. de Winter to shed her naïve ways. When the inquest considers the possibility of suicide, Favell attempts to blackmail Maxim, threatening to reveal a letter from Rebecca hinting at a pregnancy that made suicide improbable. When Maxim informs the police of the attempted blackmail, they must investigate Favell's accusations that Maxim murdered Rebecca. Further investigation with a doctor, however, reveals that Rebecca was not pregnant but terminally ill due to cancer, so the suicide verdict stands. Maxim realizes Rebecca had been trying to goad him into killing her to ruin him.

His innocence validated, Maxim returns home to see Manderley on fire, set ablaze by the deranged Mrs. Danvers. The second Mrs. de Winter and all the staff escape save for Danvers, who is seen through the windows in Rebecca's bedroom; she dies as the ceiling collapses on her.

== Cast ==
- Laurence Olivier as George Fortescue Maximilian "Maxim" de Winter, owner of Manderley
- Joan Fontaine as the second Mrs. de Winter
- George Sanders as Jack Favell, Rebecca's first cousin
- Judith Anderson as Mrs. Danvers, housekeeper of Manderley
- Nigel Bruce as Major Giles Lacy, Beatrice's husband
- Reginald Denny as Frank Crawley, Maxim's estate manager of Manderley and friend
- C. Aubrey Smith as Colonel Julyan
- Gladys Cooper as Beatrice Lacy, Maxim's sister
- Florence Bates as Mrs. Edythe Van Hopper, employer of the second Mrs. de Winter
- Melville Cooper as coroner at trial
- Leo G. Carroll as Dr. Baker, Rebecca's doctor
- Leonard Carey as Ben, the beach hermit at Manderley
- Lumsden Hare as Mr. Tabbs, boat builder
- Edward Fielding as Frith, oldest butler of Manderley
- Philip Winter as Robert, a servant at Manderley
- Forrester Harvey as Chalcroft, the innkeeper

Hitchcock's cameo appearance, a signature feature of his films, takes place near the end; he is seen walking, back turned to the audience, outside a phone box just after Jack Favell completes a call.

== Preproduction ==
In 1938, Hitchcock read the galley proofs of Rebecca whilst filming Jamaica Inn, an adaptation of another Daphne du Maurier novel. Hitchcock considered independently purchasing the film rights, but was unable to match the high amounts offered by major studios. The high projected sales figures for the novel made Rebecca a highly desirable property, and the rights ultimately went to Selznick International for $50,000 - the same price Selznick had paid for Margaret Mitchell's Gone with the Wind. Selznick officially assigned Hitchcock to direct the adaptation in September 1938.

Hitchcock and David O. Selznick clashed over the adaptation of Rebecca, with Selznick favouring fidelity to the novel while Hitchcock wished to make changes, particularly hoping to add some dynamism to the character of the second Mrs. de Winter.

Selznick first offered the job of writing the screenplay to Daphne du Maurier, but she declined. Selznick unsuccessfully pitched a number of writers to Hitchcock to script Rebecca including Clemence Dane, John Balderston, Ben Hecht, and Hugh Walpole. By November 1938, Selznick eventually agreed to pay Hitchcock $5,000 to write an initial outline. Hitchcock worked with his wife, Alma Hitchcock, assistant Joan Harrison, and British writer Michael Hogan to produce a 45-page double-spaced "storyline" which he submitted to Selznick on 3 June 1939. Selznick responded with a lengthy memo, describing himself as "shocked beyond words" and criticizing the ways in which the treatment diverged from the source material. Of the unnamed protagonist, Selznick wrote:

Every little thing that the girl does in the book, her reactions of running away from the guests, and the tiny things that indicate her nervousness and her self-consciousness and her gaucherie are all so brilliant in the book that every woman who has read it has adored the girl and has understood her psychology... We have removed all the subtleties and substituted big broad strokes.

In response to Selznick's notes, Hitchcock, with Joan Harrison and Scottish writer Philip MacDonald, began work on a new treatment which hewed closer to du Maurier's novel. A first script was completed on 29 July 1939. In the final weeks before shooting was to begin, Selznick hired Robert E. Sherwood to make some final revisions to the script and rework the story's climax, paying him $15,000. A final shooting script was dated September 7. Charles Bennett, who was in close contact with Hitchcock and Selznick at the time they were working on Rebecca, stated that the final script was "ninety percent the work of Michael Hogan, although some rewrites were done by Joan. Very little, at the end, was contributed by the one who is most famous and therefore most credited, Sherwood".

Although Selznick insisted that the film be faithful to the novel, Hitchcock did make some other changes, though not as many as he had made in a previously rejected screenplay, in which he altered virtually the entire story. In the novel, Mrs. Danvers is something of a jealous mother figure, and her past is mentioned in the book. In the film, Mrs. Danvers is a much younger character (Judith Anderson would have been about 42 at the time of shooting), and her past is not revealed at all. The only thing known about her in the film is that she came to Manderley when Rebecca was a bride.

=== Casting ===
The process of casting Rebecca occurred in parallel with the development of the screenplay over the course of several months leading up to the beginning of shooting in September 1939.

For the role of Maxim de Winter, Selznick and Hitchcock originally sought Ronald Colman, whom Selznick had under contract. Colman declined the role over concerns that the film would be a "woman-starring vehicle" and over the "murder angle". Selznick subsequently pitched actors Melvyn Douglas, Walter Pidgeon, Leslie Howard, and William Powell, before he and Hitchcock ultimately settled on English actor Laurence Olivier.

The casting of the second Mrs. de Winter was contentious and no fewer than 126 actresses, ranging from major stars to unknowns, were considered for the role. Relative newcomer Joan Fontaine was ultimately selected less than two weeks before the start of principal photography. Selznick initially argued for English actress Nova Pilbeam, having been impressed by her performance in Hitchcock's Young and Innocent (1937). Hitchcock rejected her, arguing that while she was "correct casting according [to the] book", she was not appropriate for his vision of the character. Laurence Olivier unsuccessfully advocated for the role to go to his lover (and later wife) Vivien Leigh. Among the actresses Hitchcock tested for the role were Lucile Fairbanks, Marjorie Reynolds, and Jean Muir. By August 19, the list of finalists for the role had been narrowed to Margaret Sullavan, Anne Baxter, Olivia de Havilland and Joan Fontaine. Selznick ultimately offered the role to Fontaine, announcing her casting on 5 September 1939, just three days before filming was to begin.

Australian stage actress Judith Anderson was cast in the role of Mrs. Danvers at the suggestion of Kay Brown of Selznick International. As a condition of auditioning, Anderson insisted that Hitchcock personally direct her screen test. Other actresses who had been considered for the role included Flora Robson, Elsa Lanchester, and Alla Nazimova.

Lucile Watson, Laura Hope Crews, Mary Boland, Alice Brady, Virginia Brissac and Cora Witherspoon were considered for the minor role of Mrs. van Hopper, the protagonist's social-climbing employer in the beginning of the story. Hitchcock ultimately selected Florence Bates for the role after seeing her in a theatrical production at the Pasadena Playhouse. Bates, a lawyer by training who had only appeared on camera once before, required an unusually large number of retakes for some of her scenes. Selznick was displeased with her line readings, stating "I think there is no line which she could not improve on".

== Censorship ==
Before Selznick purchased the rights to Rebecca, he submitted a synopsis of the novel to the Production Code office, an industry body administered by Joseph Breen which strictly policed the morality of films released by major US studios. In the final act of the novel, Maxim de Winter confesses to the narrator that he shot Rebecca to death after she taunted him with her infidelities and claimed to be pregnant with another man's child. The discovery of Rebecca's body triggers an inquest into her death. Maxim avoids being charged, despite Jack Favell, Rebecca's cousin and lover, suspecting his guilt and directing the police to investigate him. The Production Code office described this as "a clear violation of the Production Code, since it apparently justifies and condones murder".

Selznick proceeded with the adaptation despite this warning. Breen's office rejected an initial script, outlining three chief issues (along with a long list of objectionable phrases to be excised such as "for God's sake", "you ass" and "lovers"):

1. As now written, it is the story of a murderer, who is permitted to go off "scot free."

2. The quite inescapable inference of sex perversion.

3. The repeated references, in the dialogue, to the alleged illicit relationship between Favell and the first Mrs. de Winter, and the frequent references to the alleged illegitimate child-to-be.

To remedy the first issue, Breen demanded that either de Winter be punished for his crime, or that Rebecca's death be rewritten to be accidental. The latter solution, which was ultimately adopted, had been first proposed by Hitchcock in a meeting with Breen and his assistant at the Victor Hugo Restaurant. Selznick, a strident critic of the Production Code, was annoyed at having to make this concession, complaining that "the whole story of Rebecca is of a man who has murdered his wife, and it now becomes the story of a man who buried a wife who was killed accidentally!"

The "sex perversion" mentioned in the second point was in reference to the implied lesbian attraction felt by Mrs. Danvers toward Rebecca. Breen complained of the impropriety of "Mrs. Danvers' description of Rebecca's physical attributes, [and] her handling of the various garments, particularly the night gown". Breen insisted that in the final cut "there must be no suggestion whatever of a perverted relationship between Mrs. Danvers and Rebecca." Scholar David Boyd describes Danvers' attraction to Rebecca as "inescapably clear to all but the most innocent of viewers" in the present day, though it is unclear whether this interpretation would have been accessible to audiences in 1940. Asked about it later in life, Judith Anderson denied intentionally playing Mrs. Danvers as a lesbian, stating that "we never thought of such things at that time".

The references to the extramarital affair between Favell and Rebecca de Winter remained explicit in the final cut of the film, as well as Rebecca's illegitimate pregnancy.

== Production ==
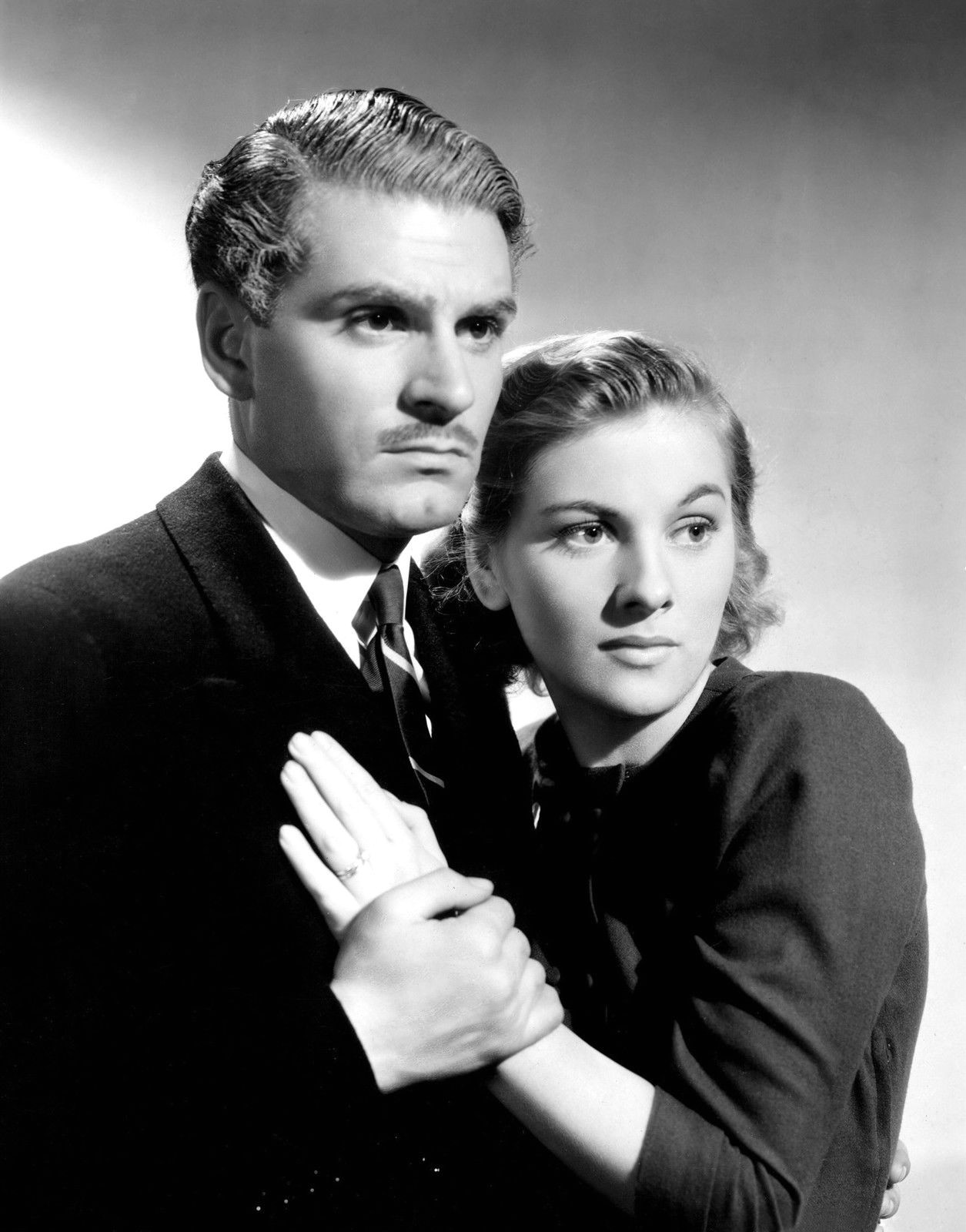
Laurence Olivier and Joan Fontaine, stars of the film

Principal photography on Rebecca began on 8 September 1939, having been postponed twice from 30 August and then 5 September. The film was budgeted at $800,000 and 36 days of shooting, but went significantly behind schedule, ultimately concluding after 63 days on 20 November 1939. The start of production coincided with the beginning of World War II, Britain having declared war on Germany on 3 September. Hitchcock and the mostly British cast feared for their families in Britain, with fears circulating that London might soon experience German bombing.

Selznick initially assigned Harry Stradling as cinematographer, but he withdrew from the project after the distressing experience of being fired from Intermezzo by Selznick. Selznick sought Gregg Toland as a replacement, but, finding him unavailable, instead hired Toland's mentor, George Barnes.

Art director Lyle Wheeler designed 40 sets for Rebecca, 25 of them interiors, mostly of Manderley. Matte painting was used to fill out shots of the sets with hand-painted details such as upper walls, ceilings and chandeliers.

Two miniatures of Manderley were created. The larger miniature occupied most of a large stage. It was used for relatively close shots, such as the views of flames through the windows during the burning of Manderley. The size of this miniature made it impossible to position a camera to encompass the full house and grounds, so a smaller version was constructed for long shots. This half-size miniature was used for the opening of the film.

Hitchcock later said that Selznick wanted the smoke from the burning Manderley to spell out a huge "R", which Hitchcock thought lacked subtlety. While Selznick was preoccupied by Gone with the Wind (1939), Hitchcock was able to replace the smoky "R" with the burning of a monogrammed négligée case lying atop a bed pillow. Hitchcock edited the film "in camera" (shooting only what he wanted to see in the final film) to restrict the producer's power to re-edit the picture. But Selznick relished the post-production process; he personally edited the footage, laid in Franz Waxman's score, and supervised retakes and extensive re-recording of the dialogue of Sanders, Bates and Fontaine. Rewrites and reshooting were called for after a rough cut was previewed on December 26, 1939.

The Hollywood Reporter reported in 1944 that Edwina Levin MacDonald sued Selznick, Daphne du Maurier, United Artists and Doubleday for plagiarism. MacDonald claimed that the film Rebecca was stolen from her novel Blind Windows, and sought an undisclosed amount of accounting and damages. The complaint was dismissed on January 14, 1948, and the judgment can be read online.

=== Production credits ===
The production credits on the film were as follows:

- Director – Alfred Hitchcock
- Producer – David O. Selznick
- Screenplay – Robert E. Sherwood and Joan Harrison
- Cinematography – George Barnes (photography)
- Art direction – Lyle R. Wheeler (art direction), Joseph B. Platt (interiors designed), Howard Bristol (interior decoration)
- Music – Franz Waxman (music), Lou Forbes (music associate)
- Special effects – Jack Cosgrove
- Film editor – Hal C. Kern (supervising film editor), James E. Newcom (associated film editor)
- Scenario assistant – Barbara Keon
- Sound – Jack Noyes (recorder)
- Assistant director – Edmond Bernoudy

== Release ==
=== Box office ===
The film earned $3 million in theater rentals from the U.S. and Canada and $1 million in Britain on its initial release. It was re-released in Britain in 1945 and made $460,000.

According to Kinematograph Weekly, it was the most popular film of 1940 in Britain.

== Reception ==
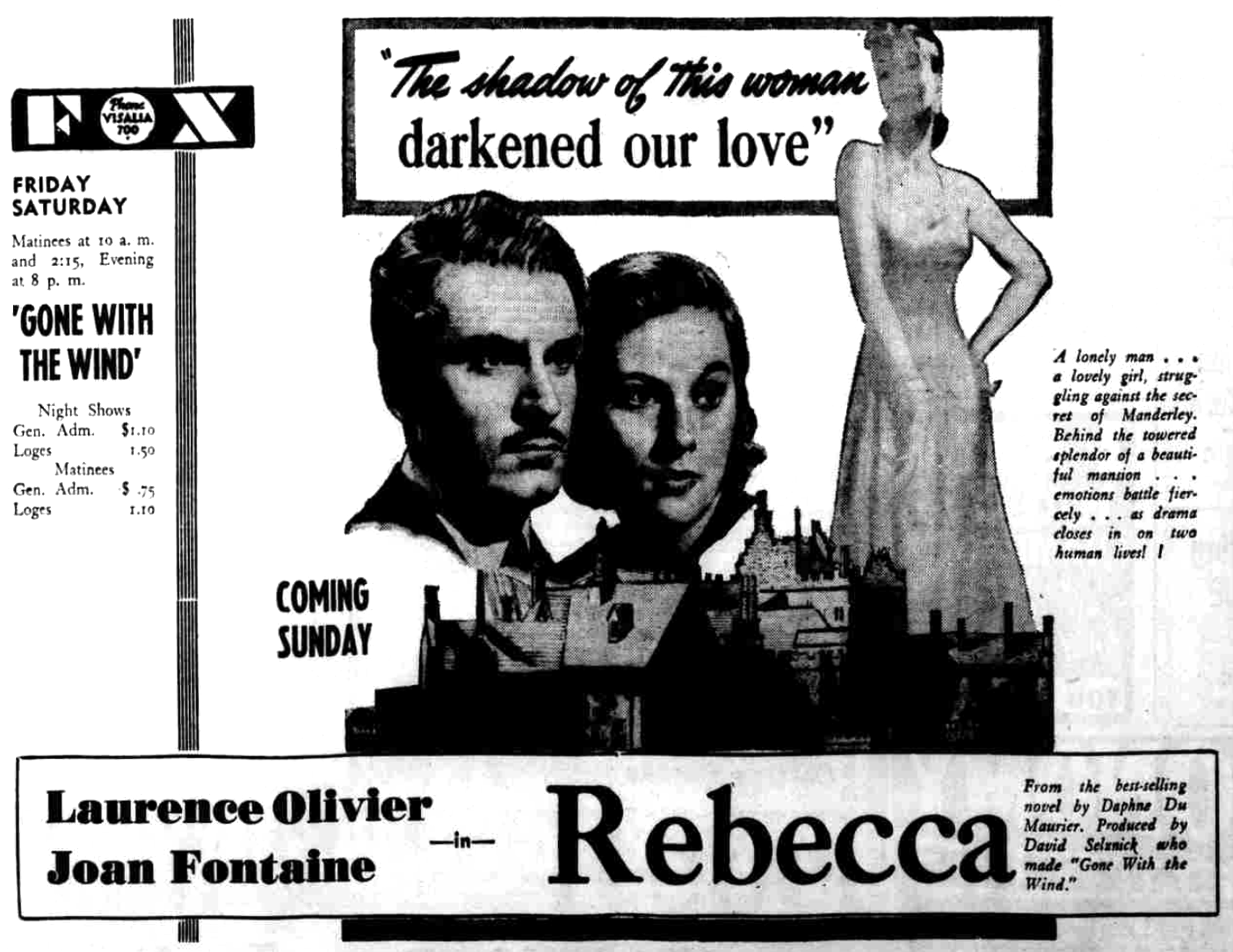
Theatrical advertisement from 1940

When it premiered at the Radio City Music Hall, Frank S. Nugent of The New York Times called it "an altogether brilliant film, haunting, suspenseful, handsome and handsomely played". Variety called it "an artistic success" but warned it was "too tragic and deeply psychological to hit the fancy of wide audience appeal". Film Daily wrote: "Here is a picture that has the mark of quality in every department - production, direction, acting, writing and photography - and should have special appeal to femme fans. It creates a new star in Joan Fontaine, who does fine work in a difficult role, while Laurence Olivier is splendid." Harrison's Reports declared: "A powerful psychological drama for adults. David O. Selznick has given it a superb production, and Alfred Hitchcock has again displayed his directorial skill in building up situations that thrill and hold the spectator in tense suspense." John Mosher of The New Yorker wrote that Hitchcock "labored hard to capture every tragic or ominous nuance, and presents a romance which is, I think, even more stirring than the novel". Leslie Halliwell gave Rebecca four of four stars, stating: "The supreme Hollywood entertainment package...with generous helpings of romance, comedy, suspense, melodrama and mystery..." Pauline Kael called it "Magnificent romantic-gothic corn, full of Alfred Hitchcock's humor and inventiveness."

On Rotten Tomatoes the film holds an approval rating of 98% based on 105 reviews, with an average rating of 9/10. The site's critics consensus reads: "Hitchcock's first American film (and his only Best Picture winner), Rebecca is a masterpiece of haunting atmosphere, Gothic thrills, and gripping suspense." Metacritic assigned the film a weighted average score of 86 out of 100, based on 16 critics, indicating "universal acclaim". Rebecca won the Film Daily year-end poll of 546 critics nationwide naming the best films of the year.

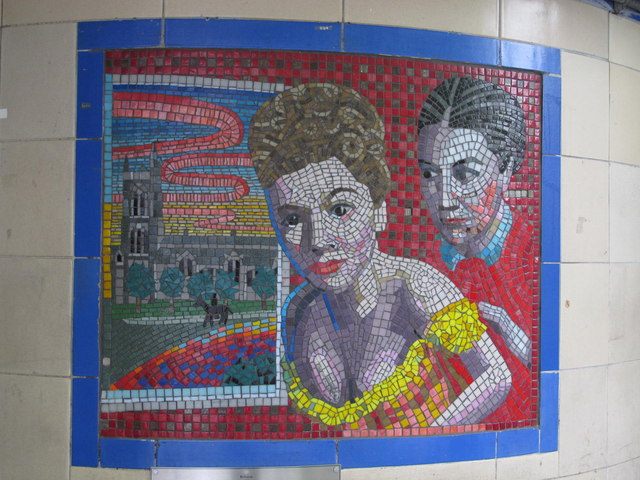
Rebecca mosaic commissioned in 2001 in the London Underground

Rebecca was the opening film at the 1st Berlin International Film Festival in 1951. The Guardian called it "one of Hitchcock's creepiest, most oppressive films". In a poll held by the Empire magazine in 2008, it was voted 318th 'Greatest Movie of All Time' from a list of 500. In 2016, Empire ranked the film at No. 23 on their list of "The 100 best British films" because although it was an American production the film was set in England and mainly starred English actors and actresses. In 2018, the film was selected for preservation in the United States National Film Registry by the Library of Congress as being "culturally, historically, or aesthetically significant". A restored nitrate print of Rebecca was shown at the Grauman's Egyptian Theatre in Hollywood in 2019. The screening was introduced by Christopher Nolan.

=== Accolades ===
Rebecca won two Academy Awards: Best Picture and Best Cinematography; and was nominated for nine more: It is the only film since 1936 (when awards for actors in supporting roles were first introduced) that, despite winning Best Picture, received no Academy Award for acting, directing or writing.

Year	Organization	Category	Subject	Result	Ref.
1940	New York Film Critics Circle	Best Actress	Joan Fontaine	Nominated	
1941	Academy Awards	Outstanding Production	David O. Selznick (for Selznick International Pictures)	Won	
1941	Academy Awards	Best Director	Alfred Hitchcock	Nominated	
1941	Academy Awards	Best Actor	Laurence Olivier	Nominated	
1941	Academy Awards	Best Actress	Joan Fontaine	Nominated	
1941	Academy Awards	Best Supporting Actress	Judith Anderson	Nominated	
1941	Academy Awards	Best Screenplay	Robert E. Sherwood and Joan Harrison	Nominated	
1941	Academy Awards	Best Art Direction – Black and White	Lyle R. Wheeler	Nominated	
1941	Academy Awards	Best Cinematography – Black and White	George Barnes	Won	
1941	Academy Awards	Best Film Editing	Hal C. Kern	Nominated	
1941	Academy Awards	Best Original Score	Franz Waxman	Nominated	
1941	Academy Awards	Best Special Effects	Jack Cosgrove and Arthur Johns	Nominated	

Rebecca was twice honored by the AFI in their AFI 100 Years... series

- AFI's 100 Years...100 Thrills – No. 80
- AFI's 100 Years...100 Heroes and Villains – Mrs. Danvers, No. 31 Villain. Rebecca was entered into the Library of Congress's Registry of significant American films.

== See also ==
- A Sucessora – Novel by Carolina Nabuco
- Gas Light – 1938 British thriller play by Patrick Hamilton
- Gothic romance film – Film genre
- Rebecca – 2020 film directed by Ben Wheatley
- Suspicion – 1941 American film by Alfred Hitchcock
