= Jim O'Brien (director) =

British television director (1947–2012)

Jim O'Brien (15 February 1947 – 13 February 2012) was a Scottish-born television and stage director.

Born in Dundee, his mother worked as a jute weaver while his father was a building labourer with Communist sympathies, his family relocated to South London when O'Brien was two. Leaving Beaufoy's Boys' School in Lambeth at 15 without qualifications, he worked in casual jobs and became interested in acting. He trained as an actor at the Guildhall School and later as a film and television director at the National Film and Television School (NFTS), in the early 1970s. "I was interested in the scale of the arena, the scale of story telling", he said later. At the Nottingham Playhouse, his performance in Barry Reckord's Skivers resulted in a Critics' Nomination for Most Promising Newcomer to the English stage. He also directed productions at the Nottingham theatre.

O'Brien was best known for co-directing (with Christopher Morahan) the much acclaimed 14-part serial The Jewel in the Crown (Granada Television, 1984), based on Paul Scott's novel sequence The Raj Quartet. The BBC's The Monocled Mutineer (1986), from scripts by Alan Bleasdale had a more mixed reception. Although O'Brien's skill as a director gained positive attention, the BBC's billing of the four-part serial's billing as a "true-life story" antagonised conservative critics as, although essentially factually based, it contains dramatic license.

The feature film The Dressmaker (1988) is based on novel by Beryl Bainbridge and set in Liverpool during the second world war. His last television work was an adaptation of Daphne du Maurier's Rebecca (1997). From the late 1990s, he also taught at the NFTS.

O'Brien married Christine Hauch in 1972; the couple had two sons.

== Other credits ==
- The Young Indiana Jones Chronicles ("Young Indiana Jones and the Curse of the Jackal", TV, 1992)
