= Manderley =

Fictional estate in the novel Rebecca

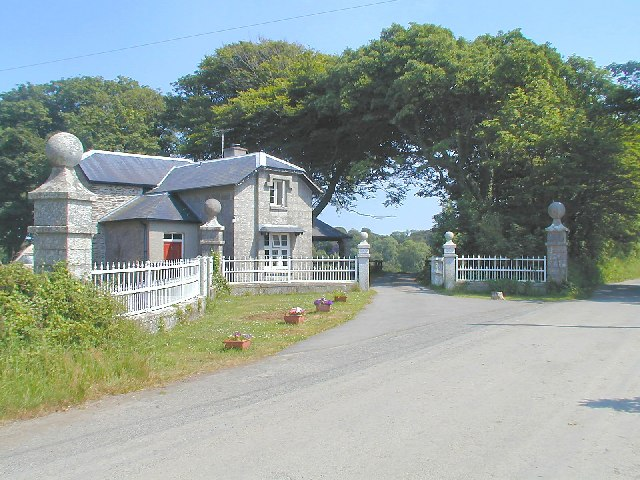
The gatehouse of Menabilly

Manderley is a fictional estate in Daphne du Maurier's 1938 novel Rebecca, owned by the character Maxim de Winter.

Located in Southern England, Manderley is a typical country estate: it is filled with family heirlooms, is run by a large domestic staff and is open to the public on certain days. It is often said to be in Cornwall, as this is where the author lived, and the nearby placenames "Kerrith" and "Lanyon" are Cornish-derived; the film version is explicitly set in Cornwall.

In spite of the house's beauty, the main character, the unnamed narrator, who has become mistress of Manderley, senses an atmosphere of doom about it, due to the death of Max's first wife (the eponymous Rebecca), and it is hinted that Rebecca haunts the estate. At the end, Manderley is burned down to the ground.

Du Maurier's childhood visits to Milton Hall, Cambridgeshire, home of the Fitzwilliam family, influenced the descriptions of Manderley, especially the interior. She told the 10th Earl Fitzwilliam in a letter that when she wrote Rebecca 20 years later, the interior of Manderley was based on her recollection of the rooms and 'big house feel' of Milton in the First World War. The adult du Maurier's Cornish home near Fowey, called Menabilly, was influential in her descriptions of the setting, though it was a much smaller house. Seven years after writing the novel, she leased the manor (1945–1967) from the Rashleigh family, who have owned it since the 16th century. Like Menabilly, Manderley could not be seen from the road.

== In popular culture ==
- Manderley appears in most film and TV adaptations: the 1940 film by Alfred Hitchcock, the 1997 television series, and the 2020 film by Ben Wheatley.
- As a result of the novel's popularity, the name "Manderley" became extremely popular as a name for ordinary houses. The Irish singer Enya renamed her Dublin castle Manderley Castle.
- A "Manderley Castle" features in one of the Anno Dracula books by Kim Newman.
- Danish film director Lars von Trier's 2005 film Manderlay is set in a country estate with a large domestic staff.
- In Stephen King's 1998 novel, Bag of Bones, "Manderley" is a semi-isolated lake house in Maine, identified with Sara Laughs, in the dreams of the main character Mike Noonan.
- There is a fully functional "Manderley Bar" in the fictional McKittrick Hotel, home to the immersive theater performance of "Sleep No More" in New York City on West 27 Street. The bar is named after the estate from Rebecca, and several characters, plots, and themes from the novel appeared in the performance.
