= Film4 Productions =

British film production company

- Logo used since 2018
- Formerly: Channel Four Films; FilmFour; FilmFour International
- Type: Subsidiary
- Industry: Film
- Founded: 1982
- Headquarters: London, England, United Kingdom
- Number of locations: 2
- Key people: Tessa Ross
- Products: Motion Pictures
- Parent: Channel Four Television Corporation
- Website: www.film4productions.com

Film4 Productions is a British film production company and the feature film division of Channel 4 Television Corporation. Founded in 1982, the company develops and co-finances films from British and international filmmakers.

The company's productions have won numerous awards, including multiple Academy Awards, and British Academy Film Awards including Outstanding British Film and Film Not in the English Language in 2024, collectively winning 43 Oscars and 97 BAFTAs since its inception.

== History ==
Film4 began when founding Chief Executive, Jeremy Isaacs, assisted by deputy chairman Richard Attenborough, convinced the board of directors of Channel 4 to provide an initial annual budget of £6 million to make films. The newly formed Channel Four Films was established with a mandate to make around 20 productions annually. Isaacs wanted the station to avoid association with 'single plays' or dramas and came up with the name Film on Four.

Christopher Morahan was offered the job as Commissioning Editor for Fiction but turned it down. Instead BBC producer David Rose, who was near retirement, was appointed.

The company's first backed feature was Neil Jordan's debut Angel (1982), while Stephen Frears' Walter was the company's first film broadcast on Channel 4, screened in the evening of the station's launch on 2 November 1982. P'tang, Yang, Kipperbang was screened the following day.

Originally, Channel Four Film's productions were intended solely for television broadcast, as the industry's "holdback" system restricted TV companies from investing in theatrical films. However, an agreement with the Cinema Exhibitors Association soon allowed limited cinema releases for productions with budgets under £1.25 million. Channel Four Films went on to collaborate with key British production entities such as the BFI Production Board, Goldcrest Films, and Merchant Ivory, and by 1984 was investing in roughly one-third of all feature films made in the United Kingdom. Their first theatrical success was The Draughtsman's Contract (1982), although it was mainly a BFI production.

In 1983, the Business Development Department was established to oversee TV and film sales, and the company began investing in international titles, including Wim Wenders' Paris, Texas (1984) and Jan Švankmajer's Alice (1988). In 1985, FilmFour International was founded as a separate sales arm to handle international distribution and co-financing, supporting projects such as Andrei Tarkovsky's The Sacrifice (1986).

Channel Four Films achieved its first major critical and commercial success with Stephen Frears's My Beautiful Laundrette (1985). Originally shot in 16mm for television, it received international acclaim after screening at the Edinburgh Film Festival and was subsequently released theatrically by Orion Classics, becoming an international hit. By 1987, the company had an interest in half of all films produced in the UK, and had secured a licensing deal with Orion Classics for US distribution of titles including Rita, Sue and Bob Too and A Month in the Country.

Throughout the 1980s, Channel Four Films supported a number of British independent films that achieved critical attention, such as those by Ken Loach, Mike Leigh, Stephen Frears, and Hanif Kureishi, and produced films including Wish You Were Here, Dance with a Stranger, Mona Lisa, and Letter to Brezhnev. Mike Leigh later described Film on Four as having "saved the British film industry...This is a non-negotiable, historical fact of life and anybody who suggests that this isn't the case is simply either suffering from some kind of ignorance or has got some terrible chip." David Rose remained in his role until 1990, approving the production of 136 films, half of which received theatrical releases.

Following Rose's departure, David Aukin became Head of Drama in 1990, later retitled Head of Film in 1997. Under his leadership, the company enjoyed further international success with Neil Jordan's The Crying Game (1992), which was nominated for the Academy Award for Best Picture, alongside Howards End and Damage that same year. Mike Leigh's Naked and Ken Loach's Raining Stones were both entered into competition at the 1993 Cannes Film Festival, and subsequent releases such as Four Weddings and a Funeral (1994), the highest-grossing UK film of all time, and Trainspotting (1996) became global box office hits.

In the mid-1990s, Channel 4 entered a joint venture with The Samuel Goldwyn Company to distribute films in the UK, later forming Film Four Distributors in 1995 after Goldwyn withdrew. Film Four Distributors' first release was Blue Juice in September 1995. Its first major successes included Secrets & Lies and Brassed Off (both 1996). In 1998, the company was rebranded as FilmFour, with an increased annual budget of £32 million for 8–10 films. East Is East (1999) became its most successful self-funded production, and a three-year deal with Warner Bros, followed in 2000, its first collaboration, Charlotte Gray (2001), underperformed.

The Film Four Lab, a unit focused on producing low-budget, experimental features, was set up in 1998, headed by Robin Gulch. In February 2003, Gulch stepped down. Later that year, Peter Carlton was appointed as his successor.

Mounting financial losses led to significant restructuring in 2002, with the company reintegrated into Channel 4's drama department. The brand was relaunched as Film4 Productions in 2006 to coincide with the rebranding of the Film Four channel as Film4.

The Film4.0 initiative was launched in 2011, funding such films as Ben Wheatley's A Field in England (2013) and the Nick Cave musical documentary 20,000 Days on Earth (2014). Eventually, the Film4.0 brand was quietly dropped.

== Leadership ==
Years	Name	Position	Notes	Ref.
1982-1990	David Rose	Commissioning Editor for Fiction		
1990-	David Aukin	Head of Drama (later retitled Head of Film in 1997)		

Film Four Lab Leadership 1998 - Present
Years	Name	Position	Notes	Ref.
1998-2023	Robin Gulch	Head of The Film Four Lab		
2023-	Peter Carlton	Head of The Film Four Lab		

Since Film4 returned to Channel 4 in 2002, the company has been run by a small number of senior executives responsible for film commissioning and production.

Film4 Leadership 2002 - Present
Years	Name	Position	Notes	Ref.
2002-2014	Tessa Ross	Head of Film4 and Channel 4 drama		
2014-2016	David Kosse	Director of Film4		
2016-2022	Daniel Battsek	Director of Film4	Subsequently became Chair	
2017-2022	Ollie Madden	Head of Creative		
2022-2025	Ollie Madden	Director of Film4	Left to join Netflix.	
2024-2025	Ollie Madden	Oversaw Channel 4's drama commissioning.	Left to join Netflix.	
2022-2023	Farhana Bhula	Senior Commissioning Executive		
2023-2025	Farhana Bhula	Head of Creative		
2025-	Farhana Bhula	Director of Film4		

== Films and production slate ==
Film4’s productions include titles that have received awards or recognition, including:

- Poor Things (Yorgos Lanthimos), winner of the Oscar®, BAFTA, and Venice Golden Lion
- The Zone of Interest (Jonathan Glazer), recipient of the Oscar®, BAFTA, and Cannes Grand Prix
- Earth Mama (Savanah Leaf), winner of a BAFTA
- How to Have Sex (Molly Manning Walker), awarded the Un Certain Regard prize at Cannes
- All of Us Strangers (Andrew Haigh), recipient of a BIFA
- (Rebecca Lenkiewicz), and (Eloise King).

Upcoming releases include:

- Animol (Ashley Walters)
- Our Share of Sand (Shalini Adnani)
- Sacrifice (Romain Gavras)
- Surviving Earth (Thea Gajic).
- The Inbetweeners 3 (Damon Beesley and Iain Morris)
- Sweetsick (Alice Birch)
- Wild Horse Nine (Martin McDonagh)

== Awards and recognition ==
Film4 Productions has received recognition for its contribution to the UK film industry, when, in 2023, it was honoured with the Special Recognition Award for Outstanding Contribution to UK Film at Screen International's Big Screen Awards. The award celebrates companies or individuals whose work has shaped the UK film industry and supported the development of filmmakers’ careers.

== Notable productions ==
The following is a list of some of the most notable films produced or co-financed by Film4.

Year	Title	Notes
1982	Angel	
1982	Experience Preferred... But Not Essential	
1982	Giro City	
1982	Hero	
1982	Moonlighting	
1982	P'tang, Yang, Kipperbang	
1982	Remembrance	
1982	The Draughtsman's Contract	Co-production with British Film Institute
1982	Walter	
1983	Red Monarch	Co-production with Goldcrest Films and Enigma Productions
1983	The Ploughman's Lunch	Co-production with Goldcrest Films and Michael White
1984	Paris, Texas	Co-production with Westdeutscher Rundfunk
1985	A Room with a View	Co-production with Merchant Ivory Productions and Goldcrest Films
1985	A Zed and Two Noughts	Co-production with British Film Institute and Artificial Eye
1985	Dance with a Stranger	
1985	My Beautiful Laundrette	Co-production with SAF Productions and Working Title Films
1985	She'll Be Wearing Pink Pyjamas	
1985	The Supergrass	Co-production with The Comic Strip and Michael White
1986	Comrades	Co-production with now-defunct National Film Finance Corporation
1986	When the Wind Blows	Co-production with Kings Road Entertainment
1986	Zastrozzi, A Romance	
1987	A Month in the Country	Co-production with Euston Films
1987	Eat the Rich	Co-production with Michael White
1987	Hidden City	
1987	The Belly of an Architect	Co-production with Hemdale Film Corporation
1987	Rita, Sue and Bob Too	
1987	Sammy and Rosie Get Laid	Co-production with Working Title Films
1987	Wish You Were Here	
1988	Drowning by Numbers	
1988	High Hopes	
1988	Stormy Monday	Co-production with Atlantic Entertainment Group
1989	Queen of Hearts	Co-production with Nelson Entertainment, TVS Television and Cinecom
1990	God on the Rocks	
1990	Life Is Sweet	
1991	Blonde Fist	
1991	Hear My Song	
1991	London Kills Me	Co-production with PolyGram Filmed Entertainment and Working Title Films
1991	Night on Earth	Co-production with JVC Entertainment, Victor Music Industries, Le Studio Canal + and Pandora Film
1991	Prospero's Books	Co-production with Canal+, Eurimages, VPRO, NHK, Cineplex Odeon Films and Palace Pictures
1991	Riff-Raff	
1991	The Miracle	
1991	The Pope Must Die	Co production with Miramax Films, Palace Pictures and Michael White
1992	Damage	Co-production with Le Studio Canal+ and Canal+
1992	Dust Devil	Co-production with Miramax Films
1992	Howards End	
1992	Peter's Friends	Co-production with The Samuel Goldwyn Company
1992	The Crying Game	Co-production with British Screen, Eurotrustees, Nippon Film Development and Finance and Palace Pictures
1992	Waterland	
1992	Wild West	
1993	Wittgenstein	Co-production with the British Film Institute
1993	Bad Behaviour	
1993	Bhaji on the Beach	
1993	Blue	Co-production with BBC Radio 3 and Arts Council of Great Britain
1993	Raining Stones	
1993	The Baby of Mâcon	Co-production with UGC and Canal+
1994	Backbeat	Co-production with PolyGram Filmed Entertainment
1994	Bandit Queen	Co-production with Kaleidoscope Entertainment
1994	Death and the Maiden	Co-production with Capitol Films, Canal+, TF1 and Fine Line Features
1994	Four Weddings and a Funeral	Co-production with PolyGram Filmed Entertainment and Working Title Films
1994	Ladybird, Ladybird	
1994	Shallow Grave	
1994	Shopping	Co-production with Kuzui Enterprises and PolyGram Filmed Entertainment
1994	Sister My Sister	
1994	The Acid House	
1994	The Madness of King George	Co-production with The Samuel Goldwyn Company
1994	A Pin for the Butterfly	
1995	Angels & Insects	Co-production with The Samuel Goldwyn Company
1995	Blue Juice	
1995	Institute Benjamenta	Co-production with Pandora Film
1995	Nothing Personal	Co-production with Bórd Scannán na hÉireann/Irish Film Board
1995	The Neon Bible	Co-production with Artificial Eye
1996	Beautiful Thing	
1996	American Buffalo	Co-production with Capitol Films
1996	Brassed Off	Co-production with Miramax Films and Prominent Features
1996	Carla's Song	Co-production with Glasgow Film Office and Televisión Española
1996	Secrets & Lies	Co-production with Ciby 2000
1996	The Pillow Book	Co-production with Canal+
1996	Trainspotting	
1996	Trojan Eddie	Co-production with Bórd Scannán na hÉireann/Irish Film Board
1996	True Blue	
1996	Walking and Talking	Co-production with Miramax Films, Zenith Productions, Pandora Film, Mikado Films (France), Electric, TEAM Communications Group, PolyGram Filmed Entertainment and Good Machine
1997	A Life Less Ordinary	Co-production with PolyGram Filmed Entertainment and 20th Century Fox
1997	Bent	Co-production with Arts Council of England
1997	Career Girls	
1997	Fever Pitch	
1997	Welcome to Sarajevo	Co-production with Miramax Films
1997	The Woodlanders	Co-production with Pathé Productions and Arts Council of England
1998	Croupier	Co-production with Arte and Westdeutscher Rundfunk
1998	Dancing at Lughnasa	Co-production with Sony Pictures Classics, Bórd Scannán na hÉireann/Irish Film Board, Raidió Teilifís Éireann and Capitol Films
1998	Elizabeth	Co-production with PolyGram Filmed Entertainment, Meridian and Working Title Films
1998	Hilary and Jackie	
1998	Martha, Meet Frank, Daniel and Laurence	
1998	My Name Is Joe	
1998	Orphans	Co-production with Scottish Arts Council and Glasgow Film Office
1998	The Land Girls	Co-production with PolyGram Filmed Entertainment, Gramercy Pictures, Intermedia Films and Canal+
1998	The Red Violin	Co-production with New Line Cinema, Lionsgate, Telefilm Canada and CITY-TV
1998	Velvet Goldmine	Co-production with Newmarket Capital Group, Miramax Films, Killer Films and Zenith Entertainment
1999	With or Without You	Co-production with Miramax Films and Revolution Films
1999	Buena Vista Social Club	Co-production with Road Movies Filmproduktion and Arte
1999	Dogma	Produced by View Askew
1999	East Is East	
1999	Gregory's Two Girls	
1999	Holy Smoke!	Co-production with Miramax Films
1999	Sunshine	Co-production with Alliance Atlantis, Eurimages, Telefilm Canada, The Movie Network, Kinowelt, TV2, ORF and Paramount Classics
1999	The Debt Collector	
1999	The Straight Story	Co-production with StudioCanal and Walt Disney Pictures
2000	Dancer in the Dark	Co-production with Canal+, France 3 Cinéma, Zentropa and Fine Line Features
2000	Bread and Roses	
2000	Gangster No. 1	Co-production with Medienboard Berlin-Brandenburg, Road Movies Filmproduktion and BSkyB
2000	Purely Belter	
2000	Sexy Beast	Co-production with Kanzaman, Fox Searchlight Pictures and Recorded Picture Company
2000	The House of Mirth	Co-production with Granada Productions, Kinowelt, Arts Council of England, Showtime Networks and The Scottish Arts Council
2000	The Filth and the Fury	Co-production with Jersey Films
2001	Birthday Girl	Co-production with Miramax Films, Mirage Enterprises and HAL Films
2001	Charlotte Gray	Co-production with Ecosse Films and Warner Bros.
2001	Christmas Carol: The Movie	Co-production with UK Film Council
2001	Buffalo Soldiers	Co-production with Good Machine and Miramax Films
2001	Dog Eat Dog	Co-production with Tiger Aspect Productions
2001	Gabriel and Me	Co-production with Pathé, Isle of Man Film and UK Film Council
2001	K-PAX	Co-production with Universal Pictures and Intermedia Films
2001	Invincible	Co-production with Fine Line Features
2001	Late Night Shopping	Co-production with Scottish Screen and Glasgow Film Office
2001	Lucky Break	Co-production with Paramount Pictures and Miramax Films
2001	Series 7: The Contenders	Co-production with USA Films
2001	The Navigators	Co-production with Road Movies Filmproduktion, Westdeutscher Rundfunk and Arte
2001	The Low Down	Co-production with British Screen, Oil Factory and Sleeper Films
2001	Very Annie Mary	Co-production with Canal+
2002	24 Hour Party People	Co-production with United Artists, UK Film Council, Revolution Films and Baby Cow Productions
2002	Death to Smoochy	Co-production with Senator Film and Warner Bros.
2002	Once Upon a Time in the Midlands	Co-production with UK Film Council
2003	The Actors	Co-production with Miramax Films and Bórd Scannán na hÉireann/Irish Film Board
2003	To Kill a King	Co-production with Natural Nylon and HanWay Films
2003	Touching the Void	Co-production with Channel 4, UK Film Council, Darlow Smithson Productions and PBS
2004	Dead Man's Shoes	
2004	Enduring Love	Co-production with Pathé, UK Film Council and Ingenious Film Partners
2004	Shaun of the Dead	Co-production with Big Talk Productions, Working Title Films, StudioCanal, Universal Pictures and Rogue Pictures
2004	The Motorcycle Diaries	
2005	Brothers of the Head	Co-production with Screen East and EM Media
2005	The League of Gentlemen's Apocalypse	Co-production with Universal Pictures and Tiger Aspect
2005	Me and You and Everyone We Know	
2005	The King	
2006	Deep Water	
2006	Venus	Co-production with UK Film Council and Miramax Films
2006	The Last King of Scotland	Co-production with DNA Films and Fox Searchlight Pictures
2006	This Is England	Co-production with UK Film Council, Optimum Releasing, Screen Yorkshire and Warp Films
2007	Funny Games	Co-production with Warner Independent Pictures and Tartan Films
2007	And When Did You Last See Your Father?	Co-production with Sony Pictures Classics, UK Film Council, EM Media, Tiger Aspect, Bórd Scannán na hÉireann/Irish Film Board and European Development Fund
2007	In the Shadow of the Moon	Co-production with Discovery Films and Passion Pictures
2007	Joe Strummer: The Future Is Unwritten	
2007	Hallam Foe	Co-production with Ingenious Film Partners, Glasgow Film Office, Scottish Screen and Sigma Films
2007	Mister Lonely	Co-production with Recorded Picture Company
2007	Straightheads	Co-production with Ingenious Film Partners and UK Film Council
2008	Slumdog Millionaire	Co-production with Celador Films
2008	How to Lose Friends & Alienate People	Co-production with UK Film Council
2008	Hunger	
2008	Franklyn	Co-production with Recorded Picture Company, HanWay Films and UK Film Council
2008	Happy-Go-Lucky	Co-production with Ingenious Film Partners and Summit Entertainment
2008	In Bruges	Co-production with Focus Features
2008	A Complete History of My Sexual Failures	Co-production with Warp Films, Screen Yorkshire, EM Media, Madman Entertainment and UK Film Council
2008	Donkey Punch	Co-production with EM Media, Madman Entertainment, Screen Yorkshire, UK Film Council and Warp X Productions
2009	Bunny and the Bull	Co-production with Warp X Productions, Wild Bunch, Optimum Releasing, Screen Yorkshire and UK Film Council
2009	Looking for Eric	Co-production with Icon Entertainment International and Wild Bunch
2009	Hush	Co-production with Warp X, Pathé, Screen Yorkshire, UK Film Council and Optimum Releasing
2009	Nowhere Boy	Co-production with UK Film Council, Ecosse Films and The Weinstein Company
2009	The Lovely Bones	Co-production with DreamWorks Pictures and Paramount Pictures
2009	The Scouting Book for Boys	Co-production with Celador Films, Screen East and Pathé
2010	Four Lions	Co-production with Warp Films, Wild Bunch and Optimum Releasing
2010	127 Hours	Co-production with Pathé, Fox Searchlight Pictures, Everest Entertainment, Cloud Eight Films, Darlow Smithson Productions and Warner Bros. Pictures
2010	Another Year	Co-production with Thin Man Films
2010	Neds	Co-production with Scottish Screen, UK Film Council and Wild Bunch
2010	Never Let Me Go	Co-production with DNA Films and Fox Searchlight Pictures
2010	Submarine	Co-production with Red Hour Films and Warp Films
2011	Attack the Block	Co-production with Big Talk Productions, StudioCanal and UK Film Council
2011	Kill List	Co-production with UK Film Council, Warp X, Screen Yorkshire and Rook Films
2011	One Day	Co-production with Focus Features, Random House Films and Color Force
2011	Shame	Co-production with Fox Searchlight Pictures, UK Film Council, See-Saw Films, HanWay Films and Momentum Pictures/Alliance Films
2011	The Deep Blue Sea	Co-production with UK Film Council and Artificial Eye
2011	The Eagle	Co-production with Focus Features
2011	The Emperor's New Clothes	
2011	The Future	Co-production with Medienboard Berlin-Brandenburg
2011	The Great Bear	
2011	The Inbetweeners Movie	Co-production with Bwark Productions, Young Films and Entertainment Film Distributors
2011	The Iron Lady	Co-production with Pathé, UK Film Council and The Weinstein Company
2011	The Woman in the Fifth	Co-production with UK Film Council, Canal+, Orange Cinéma Séries and Artificial Eye
2011	Tyrannosaur	Co-production with Warp X, Inflammable Films, UK Film Council, Screen Yorkshire, EM Media, and Optimum Releasing (as StudioCanal UK)
2011	Wuthering Heights	Co-production with HanWay Films, Ecosse Films, UK Film Council, Goldcrest Films and Screen Yorkshire
2012	Hyde Park on Hudson	Co-production with Daybreak Pictures and Focus Features
2012	Berberian Sound Studio	Co-production with Warp X Productions, Screen Yorkshire and UK Film Council
2012	On the Road	Co-production with American Zoetrope, MK2, France Télévisions, Canal+, Ciné+, France 2 Cinéma and Vanguard Films
2012	Sightseers	Co-production with Big Talk Pictures
2012	Seven Psychopaths	Co-production with British Film Institute, HanWay Films and CBS Films
2013	A Field in England	
2013	For Those in Peril	Co-production with Warp X Productions
2013	How I Live Now	Co-production with British Film Institute, Magnolia Pictures and Passion Pictures
2013	Le Week-End	
2013	12 Years a Slave	Co-production with Regency Enterprises, River Road Entertainment and Plan B
2013	Starred Up	Co-production with Creative Scotland, Northern Ireland Screen and Sigma Films
2013	The Double	Co-production with Alcove Entertainment and British Film Institute
2013	The Look of Love	Co-production with StudioCanal UK, Revolution Films and Baby Cow Productions
2013	Trance	Co-production with Pathé, Fox Searchlight Pictures and Cloud Eight Films and Indian Paintbrush
2013	Under the Skin	Co-production with British Film Institute, FilmNation Entertainment, Scottish Screen, Nick Wechsler Productions and A24 Films
2013	The Spirit of '45	
2013	The Stone Roses: Made of Stone	Co-production with Warp Films
2013	The Selfish Giant	Co-production with British Film Institute
2014	20,000 Days on Earth	Co-production with British Film Institute
2014	A Most Wanted Man	Co-production with FilmNation Entertainment
2014	'71	Co-production with British Film Institute, Screen Yorkshire, Creative Scotland and Warp Films
2014	Black Sea	Co-production with Focus Features
2014	Cuban Fury	Co-production with British Film Institute
2014	Ex Machina	Co-production with Universal Pictures and DNA Films
2014	Frank	
2014	Life	Co-production with See-Saw Films, Telefilm Canada and Screen Australia
2014	Jimmy's Hall	
2014	Mr. Turner	Co-production with British Film Institute, Focus Features International and Thin Man Films
2014	The Inbetweeners 2	Co-production with Bwark Productions
2014	The Riot Club	Co-production with Universal Pictures, British Film Institute, HanWay Films and Pinewood Pictures
2015	Macbeth	Co-production with StudioCanal, DMC Film, Anton Capital Entertainment, Creative Scotland and See-Saw Films
2015	High-Rise	Co-production with Recorded Picture Company, HanWay Films and the British Film Institute
2015	The Lobster	Co-production with Irish Film Board, Eurimages, Netherlands Film Fund, British Film Institute, Canal+, Ciné+, CNC, Institut Français, Greek Film Centre, Element Pictures, Scarlet Films, Faliro House, Haut et Court and Lemming Films
2015	45 Years	Co-production with British Film Institute
2015	Amy	Co-production with Universal Music, Playmaker Films & Krishwerkz Entertainment
2015	Carol	Co-production with Number 9 Films and Killer Films
2015	Catch Me Daddy	Co-production with British Film Institute and Screen Yorkshire
2015	Suffragette	Co-production with 20th Century Fox, Pathé, BFI, Ingenious Media, Canal+, Cine+ and Ruby Films
2015	Slow West	Co-production with the New Zealand Film Commission and See-Saw Films
2015	Room	Co-production with Element Pictures and No Trace Camping
2016	American Honey	Co-production with Parts & Labor, Pulse Films, ManDown Pictures, British Film Institute, and Maven Pictures
2016	Billy Lynn's Long Halftime Walk	Co-production with TriStar Pictures
2016	Free Fire	Co-production with British Film Institute
2016	Trespass Against Us	Co-production with Potboiler Productions
2016	Una	Co-production with Bron Studios, Jean Doumanian Productions, and WestEnd Films
2017	Disobedience	Co-production with FilmNation Entertainment and Element Pictures
2017	The Killing of a Sacred Deer	Co-production with Element Pictures, Newsparta Films & A24
2017	Three Billboards Outside Ebbing, Missouri	Co-production with Fox Searchlight Pictures and Blueprint Pictures
2017	T2 Trainspotting	Co-production with TriStar Pictures, Cloud Eight Films and DNA Films
2017	How to Talk to Girls at Parties	Co-production with HanWay Films, See-Saw Films and Little Punk
2017	Beast	Co-production with British Film Institute
2017	Journeyman	
2017	Lean on Pete	Co-production with British Film Institute
2017	You Were Never Really Here	Co-production with Why Not Productions, British Film Institute and Page 114
2018	Mary Magdalene	Co-production with Universal Pictures, Porchlight Films, Affirm Films, Columbia Pictures and See-Saw Films)
2018	The Favourite	Co-production with Fox Searchlight Pictures and Element Pictures
2018	The Festival	Co-production with Entertainment Film Distributors
2018	The Little Stranger	Co-production with Pathé, Canal+ and Element Pictures
2018	Cold War	Co-production with British Film Institute and MK2
2018	American Animals	Co-production with AI Film, Lava Bear Films and Raw TV
2018	An Evening with Beverly Luff Linn	Co-production with British Film Institute
2018	Been So Long	Co-production with British Film Institute and Greenacre Film
2018	Peterloo	Co-production with British Film Institute and Thin Man Films
2018	Widows	Co-production with 20th Century Fox, Regency Enterprises and See-Saw Films
2019	How to Build a Girl	Co-production with Tango Entertainment, British Film Institute, Monumental Pictures, Protagonist Pictures
2019	Rocks	Co-production with British Film Institute, Fable Pictures and The Wellcome Trust
2019	Saint Maud	Co-production with British Film Institute, Escape Plan Productions and StudioCanal
2019	The Personal History of David Copperfield	Co-production with FilmNation Entertainment
2019	Greed	Co-production with Columbia Pictures and Revolution Films
2019	Dirt Music	Co-production with ScreenWest
2019	Fighting with My Family	Co-production with Metro-Goldwyn-Mayer, WWE Studios and Seven Bucks Productions
2019	True History of the Kelly Gang	Co-production with Film Victoria and Screen Australia
2020	Dream Horse	Co-production with Cornerstone Films, Ingenious Media, Raw, Topic Studios, FFilm Cymru Wales, Bleecker Street, Sony Pictures Worldwide Acquisitions and Warner Bros. Pictures
2021	Boxing Day	Co-production with British Film Institute, Rocket Science, DJ Films, Studio 113 and Warner Bros. Pictures
2021	Everybody's Talking About Jamie	Co-production with New Regency Pictures and Warp Films
2021	Last Night in Soho	Co-production with Focus Features and Working Title Films
2022	The Banshees of Inisherin	Co-production with Blueprint Pictures and Searchlight Pictures
2022	Brian and Charles	Co-production with British Film Institute and Mr Box Productions
2023	Zone of Interest	Co-production with Access Entertainment, Extreme Emotions, JW Films and Polish Film Institute
2023	All of Us Strangers	Co-production with Blueprint Pictures and Searchlight Pictures
2023	Poor Things	Co-production with Searchlight Pictures and Element Pictures
2024	Kinds of Kindness	Co-production with Searchlight Pictures and Element Pictures
2024	We Live in Time	
2024	Love Lies Bleeding	Co-production with A24, Escape Plan and Lobo Films
2024	Sister Midnight	Co-production with British Film Institute, Griffin Pictures and Wellington Films
2024	The Shadow Scholars	Co-production with Doc Society and Lammas Park
2025	H is for Hawk	Co-production with Plan B Entertainment and Saturnia
2025	Hot Milk	
2025	Rose of Nevada	Co-production with British Film Institute, Bosena and Head Gear Films
2025	The History of Sound	Co-production with Closer Media, End Cue, Fat City, Storm City Films and Tango Entertainment
2025	The Thing with Feathers	Co-production with British Film Institute, Lobo Films and SunnyMarch
2025	The Voice of Hind Rajab	
2026	The Disciple	Co-production with 36 Cinema, Aluna Entertainment, Bird Street Productions, Sony Music Vision, Studio Gebbia, Unified Productions and Violet Films
2026	Extra Geography	Co-production with British Film Institute and Brock Media
2026	Midwinter Break	Co-production with Focus Features
2026	Sacrifice	Co-production with Heretic Films, Iconoclast and Mid March Media
2026	Wild Horse Nine	Co-production with Blueprint Pictures, Searchlight Pictures and TSG Entertainment
