= Grigoriy Dobrygin =

Russian film and theatre actor, director and producer

- Григорий Добрыгин
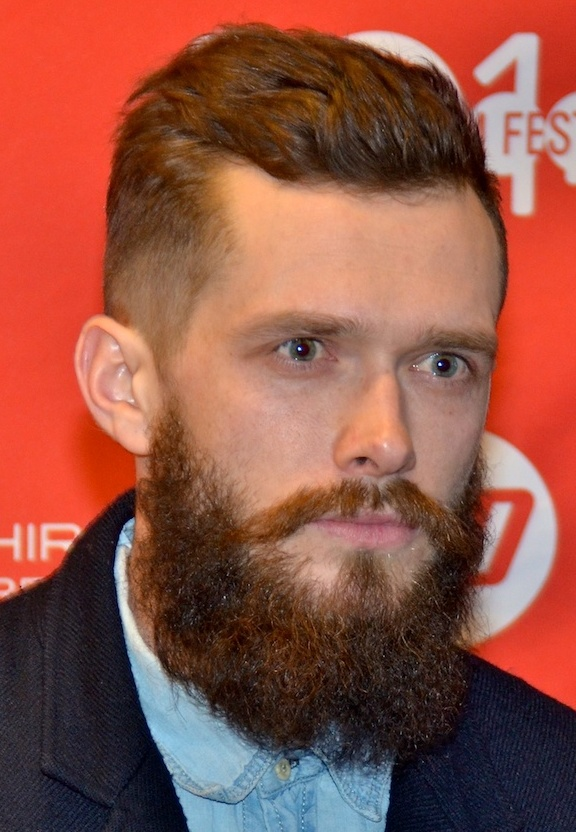
- Grigoriy Dobrygin at the Sundance Film Festival in 2014.
- Born: Grigoriy Eduardovich Dobrygin; 17 February 1986 (age 40); Vilyuchinsk, Kamchatka Oblast, Russian SFSR, Soviet Union
- Other name: Grisha
- Education: Russian Academy of Theatre Arts
- Occupations: Actor, director
- Years active: 2009–present
- Awards: The Silver Bear at the 60th Berlin International Film Festival

Grigoriy Eduardovich Dobrygin (also trans. Grigory; Russian: Григо́рий Эдуа́рдович Добры́гин; born 17 February 1986) is a Russian film and theatre actor, director and producer. A classically trained ballet dancer, Dobrygin had his breakout role as the first Russian superhero in the 2009 film Black Lightning. After starring in the critically acclaimed How I Ended This Summer (2010), he made his Western debut in 2014 in A Most Wanted Man and Black Sea. He has been called Russia's top acting export and the "Russian James Franco" for his versatility.

== Early life and education ==
Dobrygin was born in Vilyuchinsk, Kamchatka Oblast, Russian SFSR, Soviet Union (now Kamchatka Krai, Russia) at the Rybachy Nuclear Submarine Base in Petropavlovsk-Kamchatsky, on the Kamchatka Peninsula is the Russian Far East. His father was a Soviet Navy submarine captain and his mother was a professional ballet dancer from Moscow, a combination Dobrygin has called a "super-Soviet ideal" match.

His family returned to Moscow when he was 10 years old in order for him to study dance at the world-renowned Moscow State Academy of Choreography in the Bolshoi Theatre. His first onstage role for the Bolshoi was in The Nutcracker at age 12. His family lived in the Moscow suburb of Zelenograd, where Dobrygin also attended Sports school "Sputnik" and played football.

After his father had a religious conversion to Seventh-day Adventism and became a preacher, Dobrygin quit the academy at 17, one year prior to graduation. He left Moscow and enrolled at Zaoksky Adventist University in Tula. The decision to enter the seminary stemmed from his own beliefs as well as influence from his parents, he has stated. He played competitive indoor football for the seminary and traveled to tournaments in the United Kingdom and Germany.

After two years at Zaoksky, Dobrygin moved back to Moscow to study Acting at the Moscow Art Theatre School. It is not clear whether he was expelled or left it by his own choice, but next year he enrolled in Russian Academy of Theatre Arts (GITIS) to study Directing. Dobrygin has called his first year at GITIS "the worst in my life," when he lived in fear of being expelled. He said that although GITIS was strict, training with director Oleg Kudryashov was a turning point in his life. He graduated in 2010.

== Acting career ==
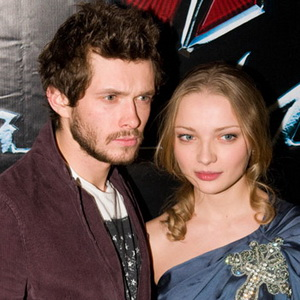
Dobrygin and Yekaterina Vilkova, 2009

While still a student, Dobrygin was cast as Dima Maykov in producer Timur Bekmambetov's Black Lightning (2009), the first Russian-language blockbuster superhero film.

Dobrygin earned worldwide recognition after director Alexei Popogrebsky spotted him at a theatre performance and ended up casting him in How I Ended This Summer (2010). Dobrygin and Sergei Puskepalis, the only other on-screen actor in the film, shared the Silver Bear for Best Actor at the 60th Berlin International Film Festival for their roles in the film, shot over three months at a meteorological station on an Arctic island in the Chukchi Peninsula. Dobrygin also won the Best Actor trophy at the 2010 Russian Guild of Film Critics Awards for his performance. Following his success; the media dubbed him "the most famous student in Russia."

Dobrygin's first English-language movie was A Most Wanted Man (2014), an adaption of a John le Carré novel. Dobrygin portrayed Issa Karpov, a half-Russian, half-Chechen Muslim who flees to Hamburg, where he is targeted as a terrorist by the CIA and German secret service. Dobrygin co-starred with Rachel McAdams, Willem Dafoe and the late Philip Seymour Hoffman, in some of Hoffman's last scenes.

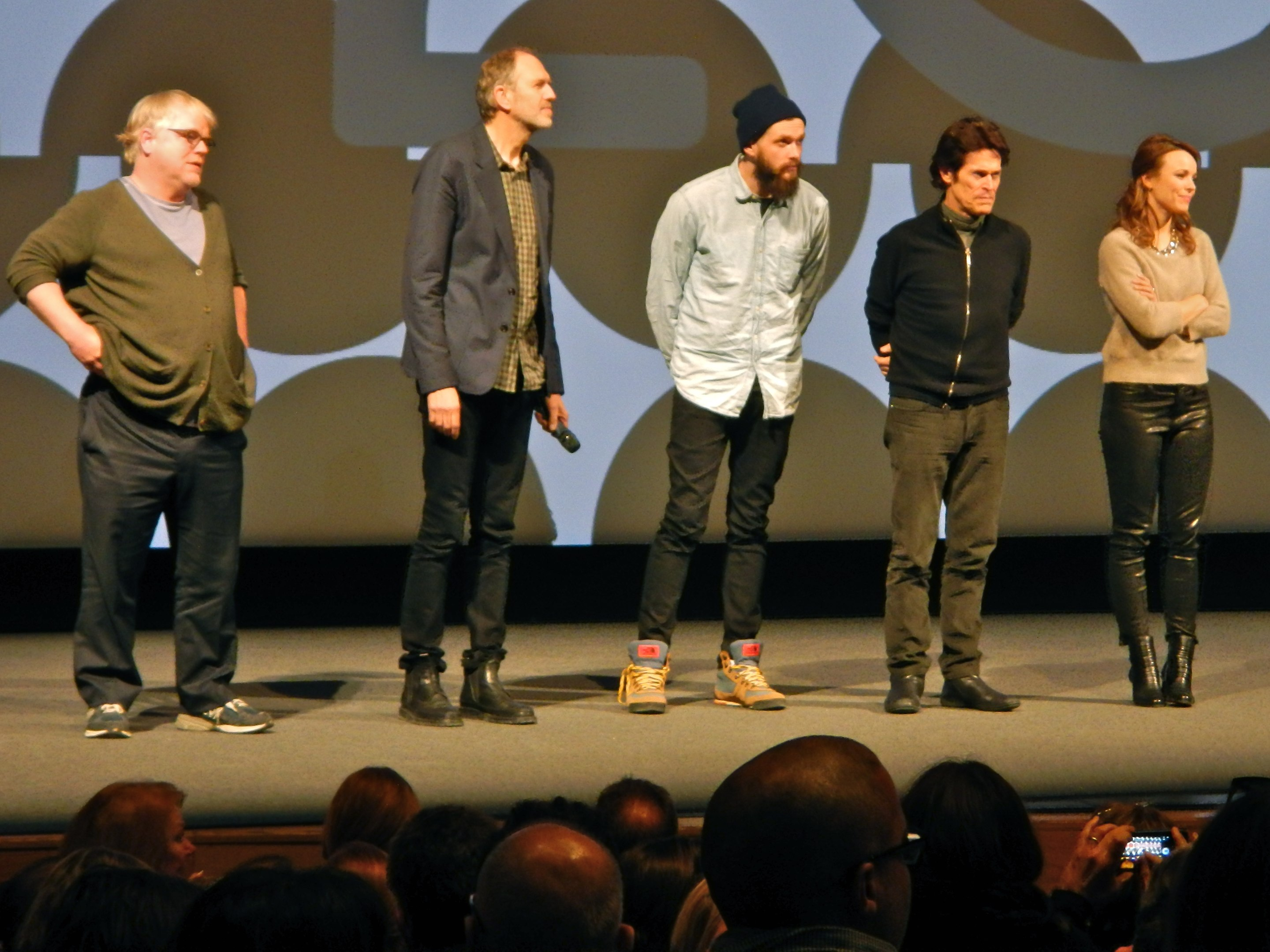
Philip Seymour Hoffman, director Anton Corbijn, Dobrygin, Willem Dafoe and Rachel McAdams at the 2014 Sundance Film Festival

He co-starred with Jude Law in 2014's Black Sea, a submarine thriller directed by Kevin Macdonald. To prepare for the role, Dobrygin visited submarine bases in Sevastopol, Crimea. He told Interview magazine that he "semi-legally" toured both Ukrainian and Russian sites in the disputed territory.

Macdonald praised Dobrygin's approach to the role, saying, “Not many Russian actors, or actors, actually, have his sensitivity or awareness. He has a very western approach, more of a method about him, for want of a more nuanced word. He wanted to inhabit the character, whereas the Russian way seems to be a lot more craft-based in its mentality."

He is also starring in another John le Carré adaption, Our Kind of Traitor (2015), alongside Ewan McGregor and Stellan Skarsgård, and in Grain from Turkish director Semih Kaplanoğlu. Dobrygin will portray Grand Duke Andrei Vladimirovich in an upcoming Russian biopic from director Alexei Uchitel about the life of ballerina Matilda Kshesinskaya, the mistress to three Grand Dukes.

In 2015, Dobrygin starred in an adidas commercial directed by Pharrell Williams, #OriginalSuperstar, along with Pusha T, Japanese designer Yoon, VJ/designer VJ Mian, and Mexican illustrator Smithe.

== Directing and producing ==
Dobrygin was a producer for the film Beloved Sisters (2014), the official German submission for the Academy Award Best Foreign Language Film.

He made his directorial debut with the comedic short Treason (Измена), which was screened at the 2013 Kinotavr film festival. He also wrote and directed a short, Verpaskungen, which won two prizes at the 2014 Kinotavr.

In November 2013, he made his debut as a theatre director at the Mayakovsky Theatre.

In 2016, Dobrygin directed a short, Mind the Gap, featuring his A Most Wanted Man co-star Willem Dafoe. The short sold for more than $100,000 for a children's charity.

== Ballet ==
Dobrygin has stated his intent to return to the dancing world through a film project. He told The Guardian in October 2014, “Five years after I stopped dancing I thought about going back. Now it’s been 10 years, so it’s going to be a documentary experiment for me: I’m going to go deep into ballet, prepare my body and then travel the world with a professional coach, an international choreographer and a camera.” In March 2015, he told Interview magazine, "I really want to go back on the big stage and dance something. I didn't finish my last year at the academy—I was not assigned to the theatre. And this was what was once the meaning of life: to dance."

== Personal life ==
Dobrygin is an observant Seventh-day Adventist; he said that his film contracts state that he will not drink alcohol, smoke, or be in a graphic sex scene on film, nor will he work on Saturdays. He declined to appear in a love scene with Rachel McAdams in A Most Wanted Man that was not in the original script, but he stated that it was because it would have been extremely out of character for the role he was playing. Dobrygin said his parents are extremely devout and do not watch television or films, although he brought his father, a former submarine captain, to the Moscow premiere of Black Sea.

== Filmography ==
Title	Original Title	Year	Role	Notes
Detachments: Solo in a Minefield	Заградотряд: Соло на минном поле	2009	Sergei Shmelev	
The Legend of Akhtamar	Ахтамар	2009	passenger	
Black Lightning	Чёрная молния	2009	Dima Maykov / Black Lightning	first Russian superhero film
How I Ended This Summer	Как я провёл этим летом (Kak ya provyol etim letom)	2010	Pavel Danilov	
The Fourth State	Die Vierte Macht	2011	Anatoly	
4 Days in May	4 Tage im Mai	2011	Fedyunin	
Atomic Ivan	Атомный Иван	2012	Ivan	
Blizzard	Метель	2013	Lyova	based on "The Snowstorm"
Treason	Измена	2013		short; writer and director
A Most Wanted Man		2014	Issa Karpov	
Beloved Sisters	Die Geliebten Schwestern	2014		producer
Verpaskungen	Верпаскунген	2014		short; writer and director
Black Sea		2014	Morozov	
Territory	Территория	2015	Sergei Baklakov	
Grain		2015	Andrei	
Our Kind of Traitor		2016	Prince	
Matilda	Матильда	2017	Grand Duke Andrei Vladimirovich	

== Awards and recognition ==
Year	Award	Nominated work	Result
2010	60th Berlin International Film Festival Silver Bear for Best Actor	How I Ended This Summer	Won
2010	Russian Guild of Film Critics Best Actor	How I Ended This Summer	Won
2010	Golden Eagle Awards: Special MegaFon prize "The Future Depends on You" for Best Young Talent		Won
2013	Kinotavr Film Festival: Diploma: "For the Unconditional Love of Self-Deprecating Humour and Irony"	Treason	Won
2014	Kinotavr Film Festival: High Achievement in Directing	Verpaskungen	Won
2014	Kinotavr Film Festival: Guild of Film Critics Prize	Verpaskungen	Won
