= A Most Wanted Man =

A Most Wanted Man may refer to:

- A Most Wanted Man (novel), 2008 espionage novel by John le Carré
  - A Most Wanted Man (film), 2014 film adaptation of the above
