= Wanted Man =

Wanted Man, or A Wanted Man or The Wanted Man may refer to:

== Books ==
- A Wanted Man a Lee Child novel
- A Most Wanted Man, a John Le Carre novel

== Film and television ==
- A Most Wanted Man (film), film based on the John Le Carre novel
- Wanted Man, TV episode 2014 Longmire (TV series)
- Wanted Man, TV episode 2007 Burn Notice
- The Wanted Man, TV episode 1962 Lawman (TV series)
- "Wanted Man" (Burn Notice), an episode of the USA Network television show Burn Notice
- Wanted Man (film), a 2024 film starring Dolph Lundgren

== Music ==
=== Albums ===
- Wanted Man (Johnny Cash album), a 1994 Johnny Cash album
- Wanted Man (Paul Kelly album), a 1994 Paul Kelly album

=== Songs ===
- "Wanted Man", a song recorded by Frankie Laine in 1960
- "Wanted Man" (Johnny Cash song)
- "Wanted Man" (Ratt song)
