= How I Ended This Summer =

2010 film

- Film poster
- Directed by: Alexei Popogrebski
- Written by: Alexei Popogrebski
- Produced by: Roman Borisevich; Aleksandr Kushaev
- Starring: Grigoriy Dobrygin; Sergei Puskepalis
- Cinematography: Pavel Kostomarov
- Edited by: Ivan Lebedev
- Music by: Dmitry Katkhanov
- Production companies: TV Channel Russia; Koktebel Film Company
- Distributed by: Channel One Russia (Russia)
- Release dates: 17 February 2010 (Berlinale); 1 April 2010 (Russia)
- Running time: 124 minutes
- Country: Russia
- Language: Russian

How I Ended This Summer (Russian: Как я провёл этим летом, translit. Kak ya provyol etim letom) is a 2010 Russian drama film directed by Alexei Popogrebski. It was critically acclaimed and garnered several awards and nominations; it was in the competition for the Golden Bear at the 60th Berlin International Film Festival.

== Plot ==
Meteorology student Pavel "Pasha" Danilov is spending the summer as an intern at an isolated, Soviet-era weather station on a remote Arctic island with only the older, experienced geophysicist Sergei Gulybin for company. Their sole job is to collect weather and tide statistics every four hours and transmit them by radio to the meteorology center.

Sergei takes the boat on an unauthorized fishing trip for a few days. When the radio operator urgently asks to speak with Sergei, Pasha makes up excuses. Eventually Pasha is told that Sergei's wife and young son have been "gravely injured" in an accident, although it is apparent they have been killed. He is told that a ship, Academic Obruchev, is coming to get them. The news keeps Pasha awake, but when he does sleep he oversleeps; the data goes unrecorded. He hastily enters fake numbers in the logbook. Sergei comes ashore with trout and tells Pasha about his wife craving salted trout during her pregnancy. Pasha starts to say something, but Sergei interrupts and teaches him how to fillet a fish.

Sergei quickly figures out that Pasha made up the numbers and explodes in anger. He tells him that the station has been continuously occupied since 1935, and that no one had faked the numbers out of sheer laziness, and that now all their work is worthless. He accuses Pasha of being a "tourist" in the Arctic in order to write a pointless essay, "How I Ended This Summer" (a play on the clichéd "How I Spent My Summer Vacation.") Sergei tells him an intimidating story about the time one geophysicist apparently killed the other due to their strained relationship.

Frightened, Pasha does not tell Sergei about his family. When Sergei leaves to get more trout, Pasha is told that the ship is stuck in ice, but that a helicopter will come before the weather worsens. Pasha, carrying a rifle, heads to the lagoon to meet the helicopter. Pasha lights a flare, but the pilot cannot see it due to heavy fog and flies away. Pasha then notices bear pawprints. He sees the distinct white shape of a polar bear. The bear chases him. He begins to descend a steep embankment and trips.

Pasha wakes up in Sergei's boat. As they disembark, Pasha tries to say that he needs to tell Sergei something, then finally blurts out that Sergei's family is dead. Sergei comes toward him, and Pasha, with an injured leg, falls to the ground. Thinking Sergei is going to attack him, Pasha fires at him but misses. He then runs away while Sergei picks up his gun and fires at him, and then keeps shooting into the air.

Pasha takes up residence in an old abandoned cabin. He wakes up to hear Sergei outside and hides, still afraid. Sergei says he wants to talk to him. Sergei, who is carrying his rifle, hears Pasha step on something that makes a large cracking sound. Thinking Pasha fired at him, he fires his own rifle. Pasha runs away.

Pasha huddles by an old radioisotope thermoelectric generator to keep warm before realizing he is exposing himself to radiation. He sneaks into the cabin when Sergei is away and tries to contact the main station for help but cannot reach anyone. Starving, he steals Sergei's fish. He screams and curses Sergei. He hangs fish up on the isotope beacon; he later sneaks back into the cabin and replaces Sergei's stash of fish with contaminated fish.

One night Sergei sees the disheveled Pasha looking in the cabin window. He signals to Pasha to come inside and have some fish. He says the Academic Obruchev made it through the ice and will come in three days. Pasha confesses that the fish has been contaminated. Sergei goes to vomit up the fish he has just eaten. Sergei returns and says only that they do not have to tell anyone what has happened. Three days later, the Academic arrives.

Sergei tells Pasha he plans to stay on the island. Pasha threatens to tell what has happened to force Sergei to get medical help. Sergei grabs Pasha, and hugs him, telling him that he needs to stay on the island alone.

== Cast ==
- Grigoriy Dobrygin as Pavel Danilov
- Sergei Puskepalis as Sergei Gulybin
- Igor Csernyevics as Safronov (voice)
- Ilya Sobolev as Volodya (voice)
- Artyom Tsukanov as Stas (voice)

== Production ==
=== Conception ===
Alexei Popogrebski stated in making the film, ever since he was a child, he has been fascinated by the diaries of polar explorers. Their ability to come to terms with the monstrous vastness of time and space amazes him. The story of two men living and working in complete isolation slowly developed inside of him over the years. After completing two features, Popogrebsky felt he was ready for this challenge.

=== Filming ===
The main location for filming was the Valkarkay polar station on the Chukchi Sea in Arctic Russia. Alexei Popogrebski intended it was clear that the film had to merge entirely with the actual, real setting. He did some research and found the Valkarkai polar station on the northernmost tip of Chukotka. Popogrebsky states in his interview with the Russian Magazine: Action, “if you look at the map, it is literally the end of the world”. Popograbsky and his team went there for location scouting in 2007 and fell in love with the place. When the group returned at the station in June, the ocean was still covered with ice; in the last days of filming it snowed and young ice began to form. It snowed for the first time on 3 August. The average temperature in these summer months was 5 degrees. The Foggy Station, where one of the most intense scenes of the film was shot, is located at the northernmost geographical point of mainland Chukotka - Cape Shelagsky. In total, five polar bears lived in the vicinity of the shooting site: the first appeared a bear with two adult bears, then a mother male (he was the one who "starred" in the film), and at the end of the shooting - a young bear who tried to have lunch with the director and cameraman. Throughout the film-making process, the film was shot chronologically, maximum jumping over one scene.

=== Casting ===
After Popogrebski came back from the location scouting, he proudly showed this place on the map to Sergey Puskepalis, who starred in his previous movie, Simple Things, and for whom he wrote one of the two parts in the new script. Puskepalis looked at it and then stated matter-of-factly: ‘I lived near there for nine years’. When Puskepalis was a child, his parents worked at a nuclear plant in Chukotka. Thanks to that, Sergey, who plays the seasoned polar meteorologist, fitted in entirely with the local workers from the very start. Popogrebski's plan was for the actors to wear their protagonists’ clothes, live their lives, and follow their routine a hundred percent of the time.

== Themes ==
The landscape and nature themself seems to become one of the main characters of this film, capturing landscapes that are striking but never aestheticised, from fog-steeped valleys to murderous rocky cliffs. The film unfolds in the remotest Arctic regions of Russia's Far East, where the personal conflict between the film's two protagonists develops as they understand the nature of their different conflicts with the looming mountains and rough seascapes by which they are isolated. As Popogrebski puts it himself, “All of us being city dwellers, we tell the story from the point of view of the younger character whose life experience is much closer to ours. However, in making this film, our effort was to become subjects to the nature of extreme North, to let go of rigid pre-planned concepts and be open and attentive to what it could offer us. And it had a lot to offer.”

Another theme of this film is the generational divides of Russian society today. The film establishes its two-character dynamic, a story of two personal (and incompatible) time-and-space scaled, using a psychologically tense narrative to explore the relationship between linear historical time and timeless.The older character, Sergei (Sergei Puskipalis) relies on old methods of collecting and transmitting meteorological data. He records water and air temperatures and solar activity using what should be described as analogue methods: thermometers, barometers, as well as a pair of Wellington boots as he wades into the icy waters of the Arctic Ocean. His younger counterpart, Pavel (Grigorii Dobrygin), fully relies on modern digital technology—the computer. Perhaps in contemporary meteorological practice traditional and computerized methods are used conjointly; however, the director makes a clear point about the characters’ difference in the use of technology.

== Reception ==
=== Critical response ===
How I Ended This Summer received positive reviews overall. How I Ended This Summer has an approval rating of 79% on review aggregator website Rotten Tomatoes, based on 43 reviews, and an average rating of 6.60/10. On Metacritic, the film has a weighted average score of 74 out of 100, based on 6 critics, indicating "generally favorable reviews".

Critic Philip French of The Guardian praised the film, calling it a "tense allegory about modern Russia." He said Dobrygin and Puskepalis rightfully deserved their awards for their performances in the isolated setting, writing that "They almost seem like the last survivors in a post-apocalyptic world" and that he sees "Sergei and Pavel as representing different sides of Putin's Russia, one shaped by older traditional ways, the other struggling to discover a new set of values." Tim Robey of The Daily Telegraph gave it four stars, writing, that the director Popogrebsky "delivers a Tarkovskian parable about nuclear horror which also functions as a sustained and nail-biting psychological thriller."

=== Awards and nominations ===
| Awards | Year | Category | Result | Notes |
|---|---|---|---|---|
| Berlin International Film Festival | 2010 | Silver Berlin Bear for Best Actor | Won | Gregorio Dobrygin/ Sergei Puskepalis |
| Berlin International Film Festival | 2010 | Silver Berlin Bear for Outstanding Artistic Achievement | Won | Pavel Kostomarov |
| BFI London Film Festival | 2010 | Best Film (Film on the Square) | Won | |
| Chicago International Film Festival | 2010 | Best Film (Gold Hugo) | Won | |
| Golden Eagle Awards | 2011 | Best Screenplay | Won | |
| Golden Eagle Awards | 2011 | Best Cinematography | Won | |
| Golden Eagle Awards | 2011 | Best Feature Film | Won | |
| Golden Eagle Awards | 2011 | Best Director | Nominated | |
| Golden Eagle Awards | 2011 | Best Film Editing | Nominated | |
| Golden Eagle Awards | 2011 | Best Actor | Nominated | |
| Golden Eagle Awards | 2011 | Best Sound | Nominated | |
| Golden Apricot Yerevan International Film Festival | 2010 | Best Film | Nominated | |
| Asia Pacific Screen Awards | 2010 | Best Actor | Nominated | Sergei Puskepalis |
| Russian Guild of Film Critics | 2011 | Best Cinematographer (White Elephant) | Won | Pavel Kostomarov |
| Russian Guild of Film Critics | 2011 | Best Actor (White Elephant) | Won | С. Puskepalis/ G. Dobrygin |
| Russian Guild of Film Critics | 2011 | Best Film (White Elephant) | Nominated | |
| Russian Guild of Film Critics | 2011 | Best Screenplay (White Elephant) | Nominated | |
| Russian Guild of Film Critics | 2011 | Best Production Designer (White Elephant) | Nominated | |
| Russian Guild of Film Critics | 2011 | Best Director (White Elephant) | Nominated | |
| European Film Awards | 2010 | European Cinematographer – Prix Carlo Di Palma | Nominated | Pavel Kostomarov |
