= Man Wanted =

Man Wanted may refer to:

- Man Wanted (1932 film), a pre-Code romance film
- Man Wanted (1995 film), a Hong Kong action thriller film

== See also ==
- Wanted Man (disambiguation)
