= Rafi Pitts =

Iranian film director (born 1967)

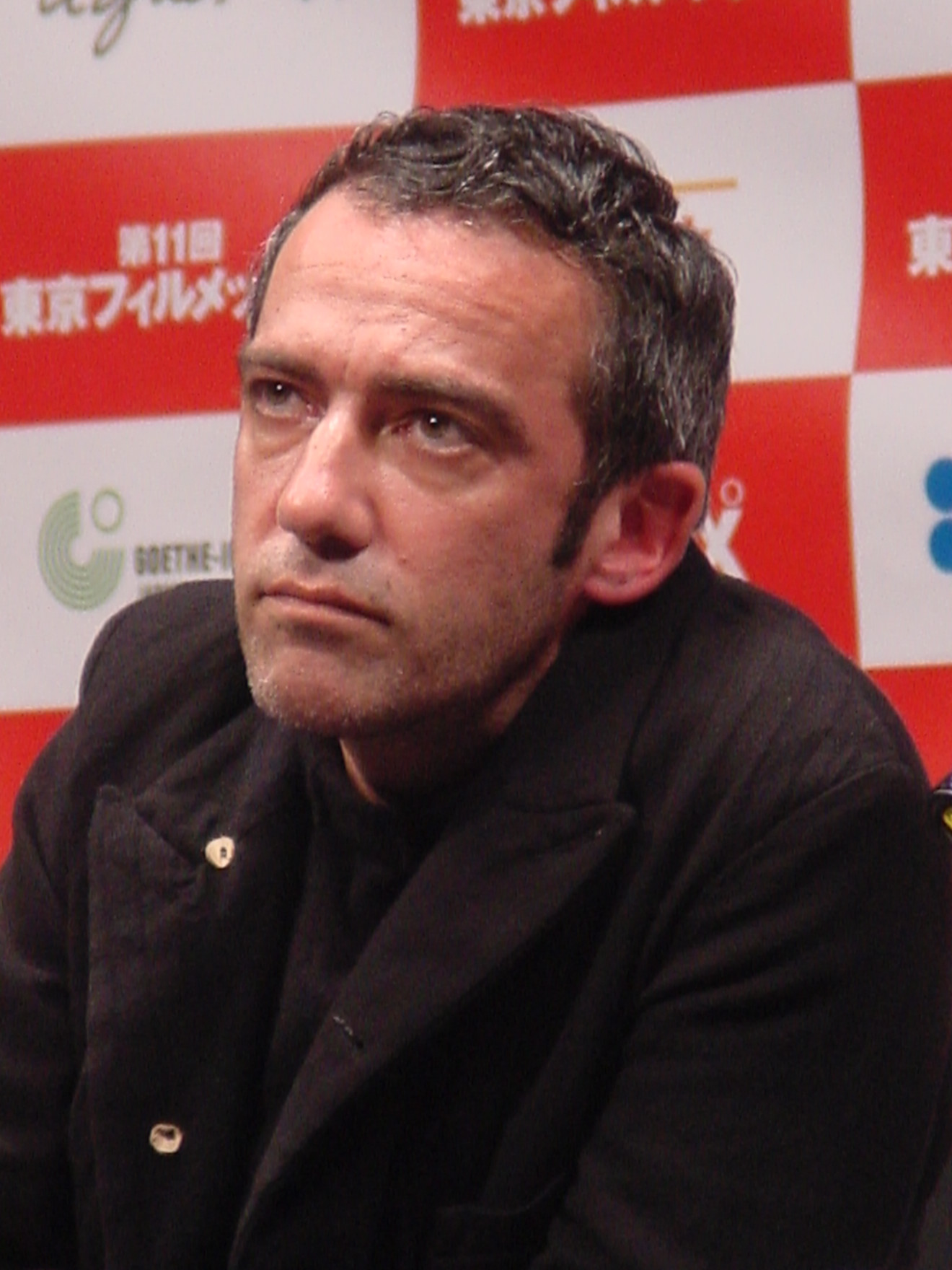
- Pitts in Tokyo (2010)
- Born: 1967 (age 58–59); Mashhad, Iran
- Education: Polytechnic of Central London

Rafi Pitts (Persian: رفیع پیتز, born 1967) is an Iranian film director.

== Life and career ==
Pitts was born in Mashad, Iran. Rafi spent his childhood in Tehran, where he lived in a basement flat underneath a post-production studio. He came to England (his father is English) in 1981 during the Iran Iraq war. He graduated in 1991 from the Polytechnic of Central London with a BA (Hons) degree in Film and Photography. His first short film, In Exile (1991) was presented the same year at the London International Film Festival. In the 90's Pitts moved to Paris and worked on films by Leos Carax, Jacques Doillon and Jean-Luc Godard.

Educated in France and England, Rafi Pitts belongs to the new wave of Iranian cinema, which received numerous prestigious prizes in the international festival circuit.

In 1996 he had the opportunity to film in Iran and he was the first film director (in exile) to do so since the Revolution in 1979. His first feature Season Five (1997) was the first Franco-Iranian coproduction since the Revolution.

In 2006, he was nominated for Golden Bear award of Berlin Film Festival for his film, It's Winter. His 2010 film The Hunter was nominated for the Golden Bear at the 60th Berlin International Film Festival. His 2016 Film Soy Nero won the best film award at the 12th Bucharest International Film festival, in April 2016

== Representative awards and honors ==
- Golden Bear, nominated, Berlin Film Festival, 2006.
- Grand Prix, Paris Film Festival, 2001.
- Golden Moon of Valencia, Cinema Jove - Valencia International Film Festival, 2001.
- Golden Wheel, Vesoul Asian Film Festival- France, 2001.
- OCIC Grand Prix, Amiens International Film Festival, 1997.
- Special Jury Prize, Mannheim-Heidelberg International Filmfestival, 1997 & 2000.

== Filmography ==
- 2023 Eureka
- 2016 Soy Nero
- 2011 60 Seconds of Solitude in Year Zero
- 2010 The Hunter (Shekarchi)
- 2006 It's Winter (Zemestan)
- 2003 Abel Ferrara: Not Guilty (documentary from the series "Cinema de Notre Temps)
- 2000 Sanam
- 1997 Season Five (Fasl-e-Panjom)
