= Black Sea (2014 film) =

2014 film directed by Kevin Macdonald

- British theatrical release poster
- Directed by: Kevin Macdonald
- Written by: Dennis Kelly
- Produced by: Charles Steel; Kevin Macdonald
- Starring: Jude Law; Scoot McNairy; Ben Mendelsohn; David Threlfall
- Cinematography: Christopher Ross
- Edited by: Justine Wright
- Music by: Ilan Eshkeri
- Production companies: Film4; Cowboy Films; Etalon Film
- Distributed by: Focus Features (United States); Universal Pictures (United Kingdom); Sierra/Affinity (International)
- Release dates: 5 December 2014 (UK); 23 January 2015 (US)
- Running time: 115 minutes
- Countries: United Kingdom; United States
- Languages: English; Russian
- Box office: $1.6 million

Black Sea is a 2014 submarine disaster thriller film directed by Kevin Macdonald, written by Dennis Kelly, and starring Jude Law, Scoot McNairy, Ben Mendelsohn, and David Threlfall. The film was released in the United Kingdom on 5 December 2014, and in the United States on 23 January 2015.

== Plot ==
Robinson, a veteran captain of underwater salvage vessels, who is divorced and estranged from his young son, is made redundant by his firm Agora along with his friends Kurston and Blackie. A depressed Kurston informs them that he has come into possession of information that Agora had found the wreck of a Type VIIC (Note: Based on Robinson studying plans for the U-651 to prepare for the expedition) U-boat from World War II that sank off the coast of Georgia carrying a cargo of gold worth millions, but were unable to salvage it due to territorial disputes following the Russo-Georgian War.

Robinson and Blackie meet with a mysterious man named Lewis, who agrees to fund their expedition to recover the gold in exchange for a substantial share of the profits and orders his executive Daniels to accompany the expedition. Robinson encounters a young man, Tobin, who claims to be a friend of Kurston and informs Robinson of Kurston's suicide. Robinson decides to take Tobin along on the expedition. A half-British, half-Russian crew is assembled with each man promised an equal share of the spoils. They travel to the Port of Sevastopol in Crimea and acquire an antiquated Foxtrot-class submarine. The Russians view the young Tobin as a bad omen, mistakenly assuming he is a virgin when he is in fact an expecting father.

With only Blackie speaking both Russian and English, communication difficulties lead to mounting tensions that culminate in a fight in which Fraser stabs Blackie in the chest. In the chaos, a fire breaks out, causing an explosion that cripples the sub, killing Blackie and Gittens, a British crew member, and knocking Robinson unconscious. He awakens 18 hours later to find the Russians have taken over half of the boat, with the British in the other half. The damaged vessel lies on the sea floor and its drive shaft is unusable, but sonar scans indicate they are close to the old U-boat and may be able to salvage and appropriate its drive shaft, as the Soviet submarine was based on the U-boat design. Robinson discovers another Russian crewman, Morozov, speaks English.

Fraser, Peters, and Tobin traverse the sea bed and to their delight discover the wreck of the U-boat. They recover the drive shaft along with the gold but Peters is killed when he falls down a trench and his air hose is accidentally severed. The crew complete repairs and the sub resumes its journey. Before they surface, Daniels admits to Robinson that the men are heading into a trap; their previous employer Agora deliberately leaked the details of the U-boat's location to them via Kurston, who is in fact alive, in the hope that they would salvage the gold, leaving Agora to claim it after the men are captured by the waiting Russian Navy. Robinson decides to remain submerged and travel to Samsun in Turkey, necessitating a risky journey through a narrow trench to avoid their pursuers. Daniels, desperate for rescue, persuades Fraser to murder Zaytsev, the engine mechanic, thus forcing Robinson's hand since there are no longer enough men to safely operate the sub. A second explosion sends the sub back to the seafloor and pierces the hull.

Fraser and the rest of the remaining crew try to repair the leaks but their efforts are futile. Before they can escape, a panicked Daniels locks a bulkhead, leaving three men to drown, but traps himself in the next compartment with his snagged clothing. Morozov closes the final bulkhead, leaving Daniels to drown and protecting Robinson, Tobin, and himself in the torpedo section where Robinson has hidden three escape suits. Robinson evacuates Tobin and Morozov and explains to Tobin that he will follow in the third suit using an emergency lever. Both men surface, whereupon Morozov informs the young Tobin that there was no emergency lever and that Robinson had chosen to sacrifice himself. Soon afterwards, the third suit appears, containing some of the gold and a picture of Robinson's family.

== Cast ==
- Jude Law as Captain Robinson. He has nearly 30 years of experience with submarines, and he was recently fired from Agora after 11 years of employment.
- Scoot McNairy as Daniels, a representative for Lewis who accompanies the expedition.
- Konstantin Khabensky as Blackie, a Russian who helps arrange the purchase of the submarine and is an intermediary between Captain Robinson and the Russian crew.
- Bobby Schofield as Tobin, an 18-year-old friend of Kurston. He becomes part of the crew after Kurston commits suicide.
- Ben Mendelsohn as Fraser, a diver who is a psychopath, and who has been in and out of prison.
- Michael Smiley as Reynolds, who served with Captain Robinson in the Royal Navy. He is currently a paper carrier after getting fired from the steelyards.
- David Threlfall as Peters, who had also served with Captain Robinson in the Royal Navy. He most recently has been working as a janitor.
- Grigoriy Dobrygin as Morozov, a Russian navigator.
- Sergei Puskepalis as Zaytsev, a Russian who has expertise in submarine engines.
- Sergei Kolesnikov as Levchenko, a Russian who has expertise in submarine electric systems. He also cooks for the crew.
- Sergei Veksler as Baba, a Russian who has expertise in sonar (the "best ears in the Russian Navy").
- Tobias Menzies as Lewis, the financial backer for the expedition.
- Daniel Ryan as Kurston, a former co-worker with Captain Robinson, who was also fired from Agora.
- Karl Davies as Liam. He works for Agora in Human Resources and delivers the news that Robinson has been fired.
- Branwell Donaghey as Gittens, a diver with a gambling problem who hadn't worked in years. He is also knowledgeable of diesel engines.
- Jodie Whittaker as Chrissy, Captain Robinson's ex-wife.

== Production ==
On 14 February 2012, news confirmed that director Kevin Macdonald was working with writer Dennis Kelly on his new film project Black Sea. On 25 April 2013, Focus Features acquired the international distribution rights to the film for Cannes Film Festival, but when Focus Features International was shut down on 31 December 2013, Sierra / Affinity took over international sales for the film as Focus Features distribute the film and Kill the Messenger when it was announced on 5 February 2014.

=== Casting ===
On 25 April 2013, Jude Law joined the cast of Black Sea as the lead actor. Scoot McNairy joined the cast of the film on 17 June 2013, in the role of a sailor who convinces the captain to undertake a mission.

=== Filming ===
On 8 August 2013, Focus Features CEO James Schamus and co-CEO Andrew Karpen announced that the shooting of the film Black Sea has started in the United Kingdom. The filming of scenes took place on the River Medway in Strood. The ex-Soviet Navy Foxtrot-class submarine "U-475 Black Widow", (Note: Not its original name, but a name given to it by its private owners. Soviet Foxtrot-class subs were not named, and the Soviets never used U- designations.) which is moored on the Medway near Rochester and Strood, was used for some exterior shots. A scene showing the submarine setting sail shows Grain Power Station (or possibly Kingsnorth Power Station) in the background, briefly, though the submarine itself is likely CGI since the actual U-475 is not seaworthy.

== Release ==
Black Sea was released on 5 December 2014, in British cinemas. It had a limited release in the US on 23 January 2015.

== Reception ==
On review aggregation website Rotten Tomatoes, the film holds an approval rating of 80% based on 141 reviews, with an average rating of 6.5/10. The website's critical consensus reads, "Black Sea may not be particularly deep, but thanks to Kevin Macdonald's judicious direction and a magnetic performance from Jude Law, it remains an efficiently well-crafted thriller." On Metacritic, which assigns a normalized rating to reviews, the film has a weighted average score of 62 out of 100, based on reviews from 33 critics, indicating "generally favorable" reviews.

Writing about its influences from The Treasure of the Sierra Madre and Sorcerer, Mark Kermode of The Guardian said, "While it may not rival the films to which it alludes, this remains a convincingly muscular genre piece with plenty of dramatic clout."

=== Awards ===
Awards
Award	Category	Nominees	Result
24th Courmayeur Noir Film Festival	Black Lion for Best Feature	Kevin Macdonald	Won

== See also ==
- 2014 in film
- List of American films of 2014
- List of British films of 2014
- List of Russian films of 2014
