= 60th Berlin International Film Festival =

2010 film festival in Berlin, Germany

- Opening film: Apart Together
- Closing film: About Her Brother
- Location: Berlin, Germany
- Founded: 1951
- Awards: Golden Bear: Bal
- Hosted by: Anke Engelke
- No. of films: 310 films
- Festival date: 11–21 February 2010
- Website: Website

Berlin International Film Festival chronology
- 61st 59th

The 60th annual Berlin International Film Festival was held from 11 to 21 February 2010, with Werner Herzog as president of the jury. The opening film of the festival was Chinese director Wang Quan'an's romantic drama Apart Together, in competition, while the closing film is Japanese director Yoji Yamada's About Her Brother, which was screened out of competition.

The Golden Bear went to Turkish film Bal directed by Semih Kaplanoğlu. A new record attendance was established with 282,000 sold tickets, according to the organizers. A restored version of Fritz Lang's Metropolis was also shown at the festival.

== Juries ==
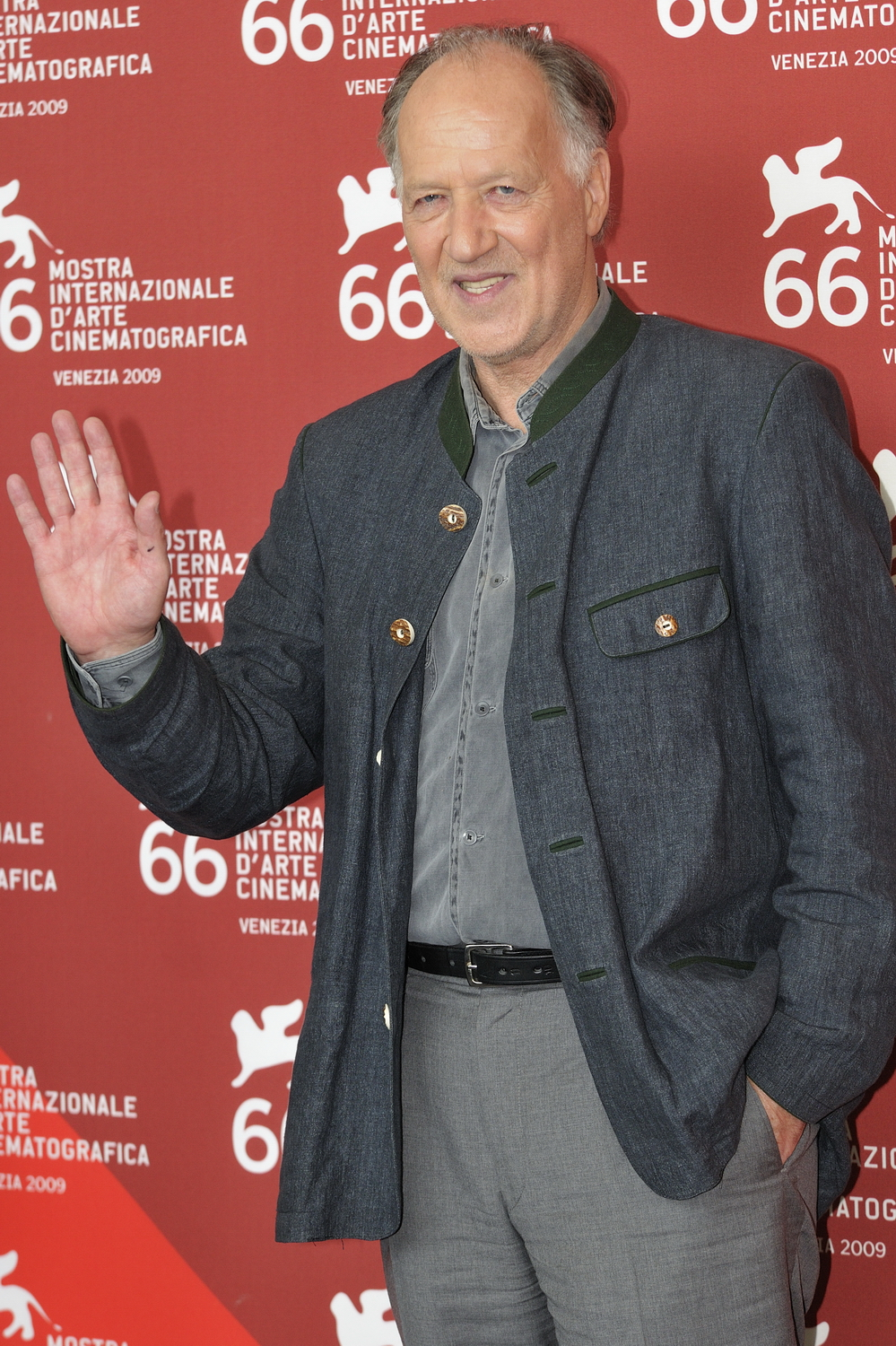
Werner Herzog, Jury President

The following people were announced as being on the jury for the festival:

=== Main Competition ===
- Werner Herzog, German filmmaker - Jury President
- Francesca Comencini, Italy director and screenwriter
- Nuruddin Farah, Somali writer
- Cornelia Froboess, German actress and singer
- José María Morales, Spanish producer
- Yu Nan, Chinese actress
- Renée Zellweger, American actress

=== Best First Feature Award ===
- Michael Verhoeven, German actor, director and screenwriter
- Ben Foster, American actor
- Lorna Tee, Malay producer

=== Short Film Competition ===
- Zita Carvalhosa, Brazilian producer
- Max Dax, German publisher and producer
- Samm Haillay, British producer

== Official Sections ==
=== Main Competition ===
The following films were selected in competition for the Golden Bear and Silver Bear awards:

Title	Original title	Director	Country
Apart Together	团圆	Wang Quan'an	China
Caterpillar	キャタピラー	Kōji Wakamatsu	Japan
A Family	En Familie	Pernille Fischer Christensen	Denmark
The Ghost Writer		Roman Polanski	United Kingdom, France, Germany
Greenberg		Noah Baumbach	United States
Honey	Bal	Semih Kaplanoğlu	Turkey, Germany
How I Ended This Summer	Как я провёл этим летом	Alexei Popogrebski	Russia
Howl		Rob Epstein and Jeffrey Friedman	United States
The Hunter	Shekarchi	Rafi Pitts	Iran, Germany
If I Want to Whistle, I Whistle	Eu când vreau să fluier, fluier	Florin Șerban	Romania
Jew Suss: Rise and Fall	Jud Süss – Film ohne Gewissen	Oskar Roehler	Austria, Germany
The Killer Inside Me		Michael Winterbottom	United States
Mammuth		Benoît Delépine and Gustave de Kervern	France
On the Path	Na putu	Jasmila Žbanić	Bosnia and Herzegovina, Austria, Germany, Croatia
Puzzle	Rompecabezas	Natalia Smirnoff	Argentina
The Robber	Der Räuber	Benjamin Heisenberg	Austria, Germany
Shahada		Burhan Qurbani	Germany
A Simple Noodle Story	三枪拍案惊奇	Zhang Yimou	China
A Somewhat Gentle Man	En ganske snill mann	Hans Petter Moland	Norway
Submarino		Thomas Vinterberg	Denmark

=== Out of Competition ===
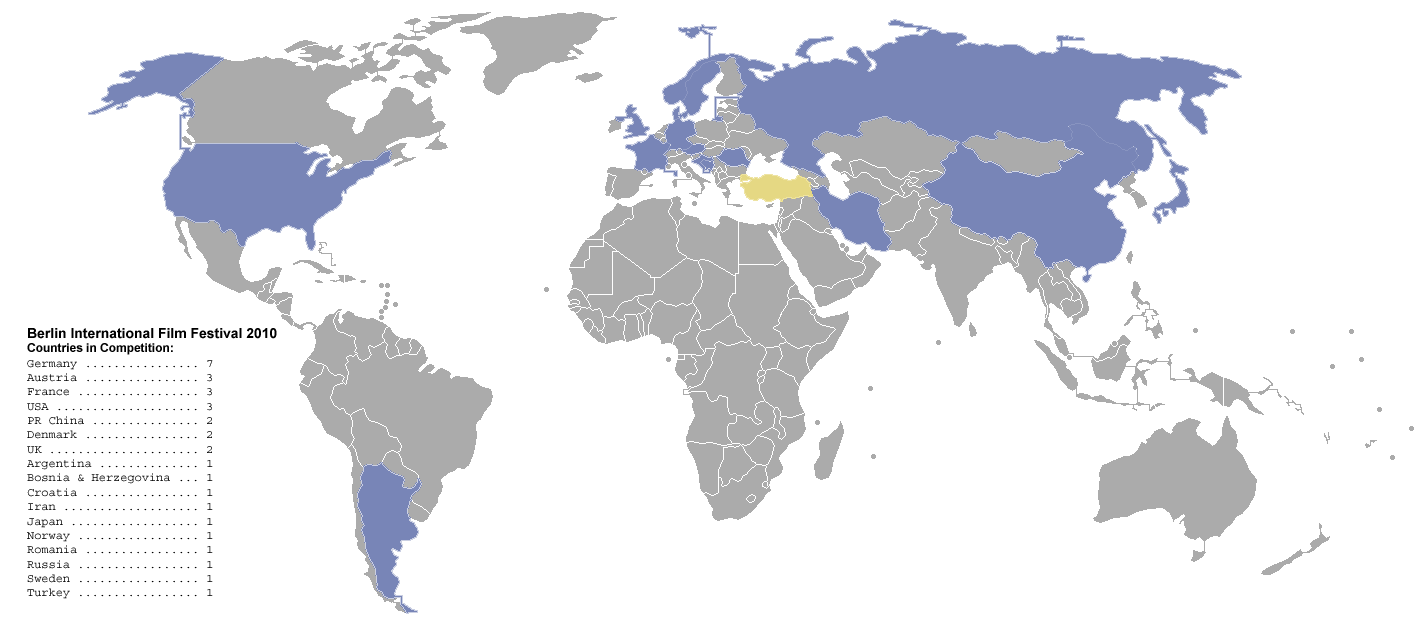
Countries in competition (incl. co-production countries)

The following films made their international debut by screening out of competition at the festival:

Title	Director	Country
About Her Brother	Yoji Yamada	Japan
Exit Through the Gift Shop	Banksy	United Kingdom
My Name Is Khan	Karan Johar	India
Arekti Premer Golpo	Kaushik Ganguly	India
Please Give	Nicole Holofcener	United States
Portrait of the Fighter as a Young Man	Constantin Popescu	Romania
The Kids are All Right	Lisa Cholodenko	United States
Shutter Island	Martin Scorsese	United States

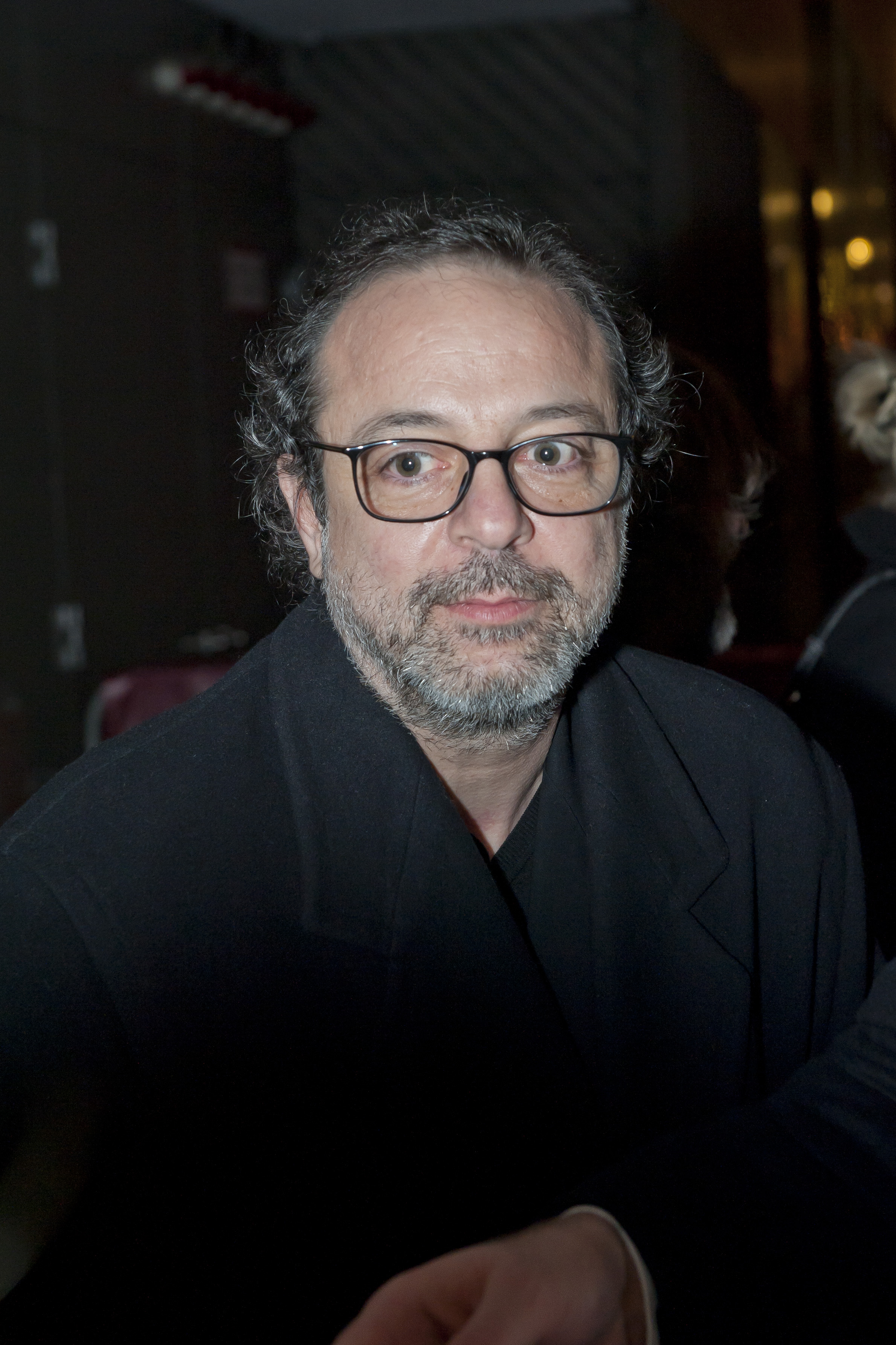
Semih Kaplanoğlu, winner of the Golden Bear at the festival

== Official Awards ==
=== Main Competition ===
The following prizes were awarded by the Jury:

- Golden Bear: Bal by Semih Kaplanoğlu
- Silver Bear Grand Jury Prize: If I Want to Whistle, I Whistle by Florin Șerban
- Silver Bear for Best Director: Roman Polanski for The Ghost Writer
- Silver Bear for Best Actress: Shinobu Terajima for Caterpillar
- Silver Bear for Best Actor: Grigoriy Dobrygin and Sergei Puskepalis for How I Ended This Summer
- Silver Bear for Best Screenplay: Jin Na and Wang Quan'an for Apart Together
- Outstanding Artistic Contribution (Camera): Pavel Kostomarov for How I Ended This Summer
- Alfred Bauer Prize: If I Want to Whistle, I Whistle by Florin Șerban

=== Honorary Golden Bear ===
- Wolfgang Kohlhaase
- Hanna Schygulla

=== The Berlinale Camera ===
- Yoji Yamada
- Ulrich Gregor and Erika Gregor
- Fine Art Foundry Noack

== Independent Awards ==
=== Crystal Bear ===
- Generation Kplus: Echoes of the Rainbow
- Generation 14plus: Neukölln Unlimited
