= Doctor (2023 film) =

- Directed by: Artyom Temnikov
- Written by: Mariya Anufriyeva; Tamara Bocharova; Artyom Temnikov
- Produced by: Asya Temnikova; Olga Tsirsen
- Starring: Sergei Puskepalis; Anna Begunova; Igor Chernevich; Anna Churina; Tatyana Grishkova; Roman Konoplyov; Tatyana Korovina; Denis Loginov
- Cinematography: Aleksey Fyodorov
- Edited by: Sergey Ivanov
- Music by: Sergey Lebedev; Konstantin Poznekov
- Production company: AT Production
- Distributed by: AVK`PRO
- Release date: April 13, 2023 (Russia)
- Running time: 120 minutes
- Country: Russia
- Language: Russian

Doctor (Russian: Доктор) is a 2023 Russian drama film directed by Artyom Temnikov. It stars Sergei Puskepalis. This film was theatrically released on April 13, 2023.

== Plot ==
The film takes place in a psycho-neurological department for adolescents, in which one patient almost died. Adults believe that one of the guys is to blame. Doctors are afraid that something similar will happen again. A talented psychiatrist, Ivan Khristoforov, who is known for his pedagogical methods, will have to figure this out.

== Cast ==
- Sergei Puskepalis as dr. Khristoforov
- Anna Begunova as Swick's mother
- Igor Chernevich as Boris
- Anna Churina as Elata's mother
- Tatyana Grishkova as Anna Arkadyevna
- Roman Konoplyov as Creature
- Tatyana Korovina as Roza
- Denis Loginov as Vanechka
- Veronika Ustimova as Elata
- Elena Susanina as Khristoforov's mother
