= Valkarkay =

Bay in the Chukchi Sea, Russia

Coordinates: 70.083333°N 170.933333°E

Valkarkay (Russian: Валькаркай) is a bay in the very north of Chaunsky District, Chukotka, Russia on the Chukchi Sea. It is the site of a polar weather station established in 1932 and was the primary location used in the film How I Ended This Summer.
