= The Hunter (2010 film) =

2010 film

- Film poster
- Persian: Shekarchi
- Directed by: Rafi Pitts
- Written by: Rafi Pitts
- Produced by: Thanassis Karathanos; Mohammad Reza Takhtkeshian
- Starring: Rafi Pitts
- Cinematography: Mohammad Davudi
- Edited by: Hassan Hassandoost
- Release dates: 16 February 2010 (Berlinale); 8 April 2010 (Germany)
- Running time: 90 minutes
- Countries: Germany; Iran
- Language: Persian

The Hunter (Persian: Shekarchi) is a 2010 Iranian drama film directed by and starring Rafi Pitts. It was nominated for the Golden Bear at the 60th Berlin International Film Festival.

== Plot ==
Working-class Ali takes a job as a factory watchman to support his wife Sara and daughter Saba, but his night shift gives him little time to see them. During his off hours he enjoys hunting in the woods. One day he returns from work to find Sara and Saba are gone from his apartment. Soon after he is called to the police station where he learns his wife has been shot during a protest and his daughter is missing. Some days later, he is asked to identify the body of a young girl. Ali visits his mother, but doesn't tell her about the deaths of his wife and daughter.

Ali parks his car by a motorway and shoots at a passing police car, killing both officers inside. He then escapes into the back country. After a chase, he flees into the woods, but is captured by two police officers who subsequently become lost. The officers argue about what to do with the prisoner. One seems more sympathetic to Ali, and tells him that the other is trying to shift the blame for killing a civilian.

Camping in an abandoned house for the night, the more sympathetic officer unlocks Ali's handcuffs and gives him a gun, suggesting he kill the other officer before leaving. Ali holds the officer at gunpoint, but takes his clothes and leaves him handcuffed instead of killing him. Leaving the house, he is shot by the other officer.

== Cast ==
- Rafi Pitts as Ali Alavi
- Mitra Hajjar as Sara Alavi
- Ali Nicksaulat as Officer Nazem
- Hassan Ghalenoi as Police Soldier
- Amir Ayoubi as Police Officer
- Naser Madahi as Night guard 1
- Ali Mazinani as Young night guard
- Hossein Nickbakht as Hotel
- Gholamreza Rajabzadeh as Police Officer
- Mansour Dowlatmand as Police Officer
- Manoochehr Rahimi as Inspector
- Saba Yaghoobi as Saba Alavi
- Sara Kamrani as Orphonage Nurse
- Malek Jahan Khazai as Mother
- Ismaïl Amani as Sanam
- Ossta Shah Tir as Father

== Reception ==
On review aggregator Rotten Tomatoes, the film holds an approval rating of 76% based on 25 reviews, with a weighted average rating of 6.2/10. On Metacritic, the film has a weighted average score of 76 out of 100, based on 11 critics, indicating "generally favorable reviews".
