= Krylya nad Berlinom =

1941. Wings Over Berlin
- Directed by: Konstantin Buslov
- Written by: Anatoly Usov; Aleksey Borodachyov; Konstantin Buslov
- Produced by: Konstantin Buslov
- Starring: Maksim Bityukov; Sergei Puskepalis; Gela Meskhi; Andrei Kharenko; Sergey Gilyov; Yevgeny Antropov; Vladimir Tyaptushkin; Stepan Belozerov
- Cinematography: Kirill Klepalov
- Edited by: Margarita Smirnova
- Music by: Sergei Stern
- Production companies: R.B. Productions; Planeta Inform Film Distribution
- Distributed by: KaroProkat (English: KaroRental)
- Release date: April 28, 2022 (Russia)
- Running time: 100 minutes
- Country: Russia
- Language: Russian
- Budget: $7 million
- Box office: ₽119 million

1941. Wings Over Berlin (Russian: 1941. Крылья над Берлином, romanized: 1941. Krylya nad Berlinom) is a 2022 Russian WWII film directed by Konstantin Buslov, also presented by the producer and one of the film's screenwriters. It stars Maksim Bityukov and Sergei Puskepalis in supporting roles. The film tells about the heroic deed of the pilots of the 1st Mine-Torpedo Aviation Regiment of the Baltic Fleet Air Force, headed by Colonel Preobrazhensky, who were tasked with striking Berlin.

1941. Wings Over Berlin is scheduled to be theatrically released in Russia on wide screen April 28, 2022.

== Plot ==
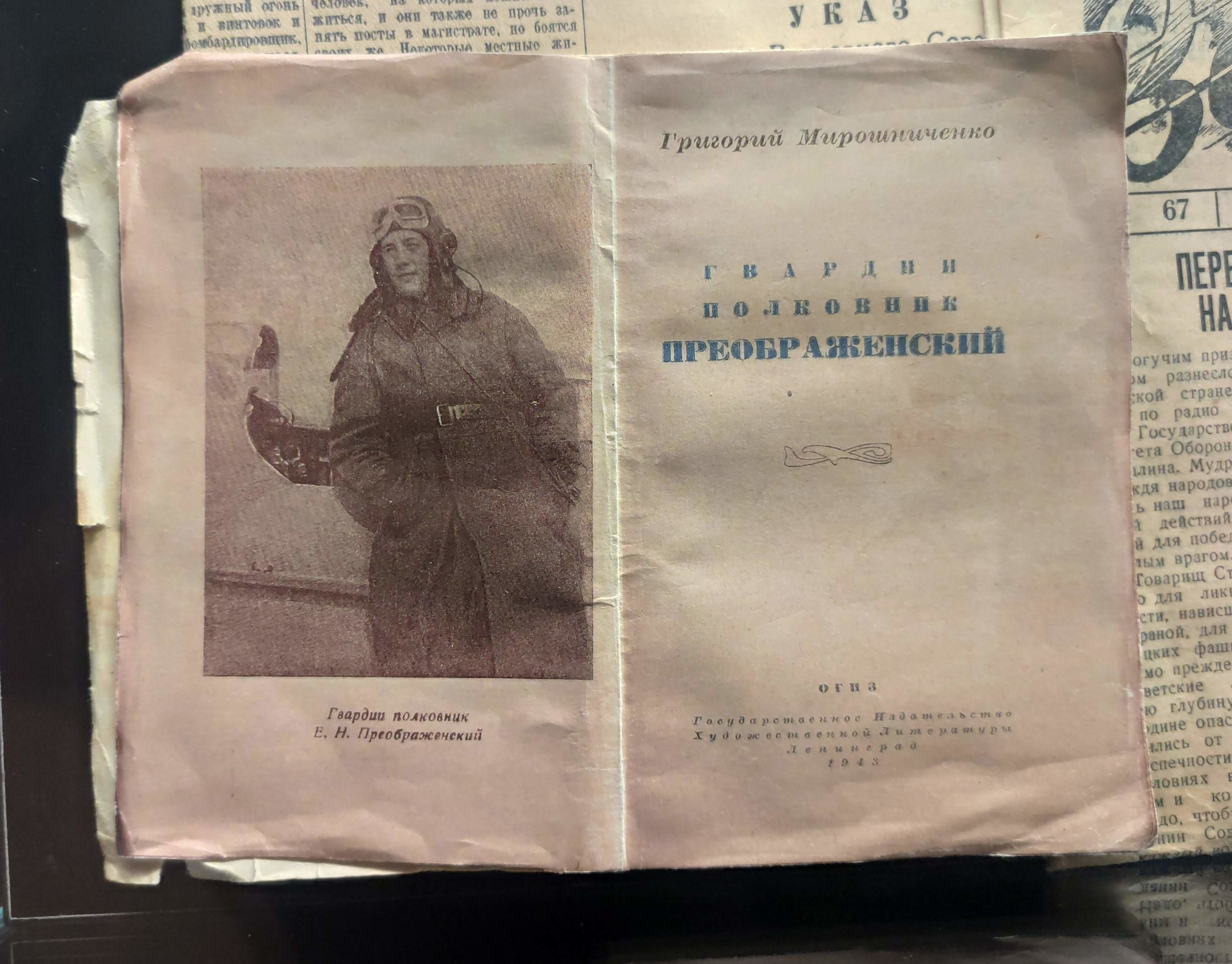
This is a photo of a cultural heritage object in Vsevolozhsk.

The film tells the story of the preparations for the first bombing of Berlin by Soviet Air Forces in August 1941 using Ilyushin DB-3 aircraft.

The complexity of the task consisted not only in the powerful air defense of the German territories, but also in the flight range. The strike group of the 1st Mine-Torpedo Aviation Regiment of the 8th air brigade of the Baltic Fleet Air Force under the command of Colonel Yevgeny Preobrazhensky had to overcome almost 1800 kilometers without refueling. The route passed along the line: the island of Ezel Saaremaa - Swinemünde - Stettin - Berlin at a distance of 1765 km, of which 1400 km were above the sea. The flight duration was 7 hours. The main defense against enemy air defenses could only be the flight altitude, but it was not just a high altitude, but the maximum - 7 thousand meters. The temperature outside reached minus 35-40 degrees, because of which the glass of the cockpits of the aircraft and the goggles of the headsets froze over. In addition, the pilots had to work all these hours in oxygen masks.

That night, five planes of the 1st Mine-Torpedo Aviation Regiment, led by its commander Yevgeny Preobrazhensky, flew over Berlin, attacking military targets in Berlin, the rest bombed the German port city of Stettin. “My place is Berlin! The task was completed. Let's go back to base!" These words of radio operator Vasily Krotenko sounded live on the night of August 8, 1941 over the blazing ruins of military facilities in the capital of the Third Reich.

== Cast ==
- Maksim Bityukov as Colonel Yevgeny Preobrazhensky
- Sergei Puskepalis as Air Lieutenant General Semyon Zhavoronkov
- Gela Meskhi as Vladimir Kokkinaki, a test pilot
- Andrei Kharenko as Khokhlov, flagship navigator
- Sergey Gilyov as Captain Vydrin
- Yevgeny Antropov as Kachanov, a navigator
- Vladimir Tyaptushkin as Ryzhy, an experienced shooter
- Stepan Belozerov as Murashov, a rookie shooter
- Nikolai Kozak as Oganezov, air regiment commissar
- Aleksey Ovsyannikov as Major Baranov, squadron leader
- Aleksandr Metyolkin as Lieutenant Cheremis, his navigator
- Leonela Manturova as Emma, a local teacher

== Production ==
The script for the film was written by Aleksey Borodachyov and Anatoly Usov, who previously worked with Konstantin Buslov together when creating the biographical film AK-47 (2020 film). The director of the tape was also made by Konstantin Buslov.

An inaccuracy has been made. DB-3-2M-87 bombers are depicted as raiding Berlin. In fact, DB-3F-2M-88 aircraft took part in it. In 1942, the aircraft was renamed Il-4.

=== Filming ===
Principal photography historical paintings took place on the Estonian island of Saaremaa, Moscow and Berlin.

== Release ==
1941. Wings Over Berlin was released in the Russian Federation in theaters on April 28, 2022, by KaroRental.
