= Sergei Puskepalis =

Russian actor and theatre director (1966–2022)

Sergei Puskepalis Сергей Пускепалис
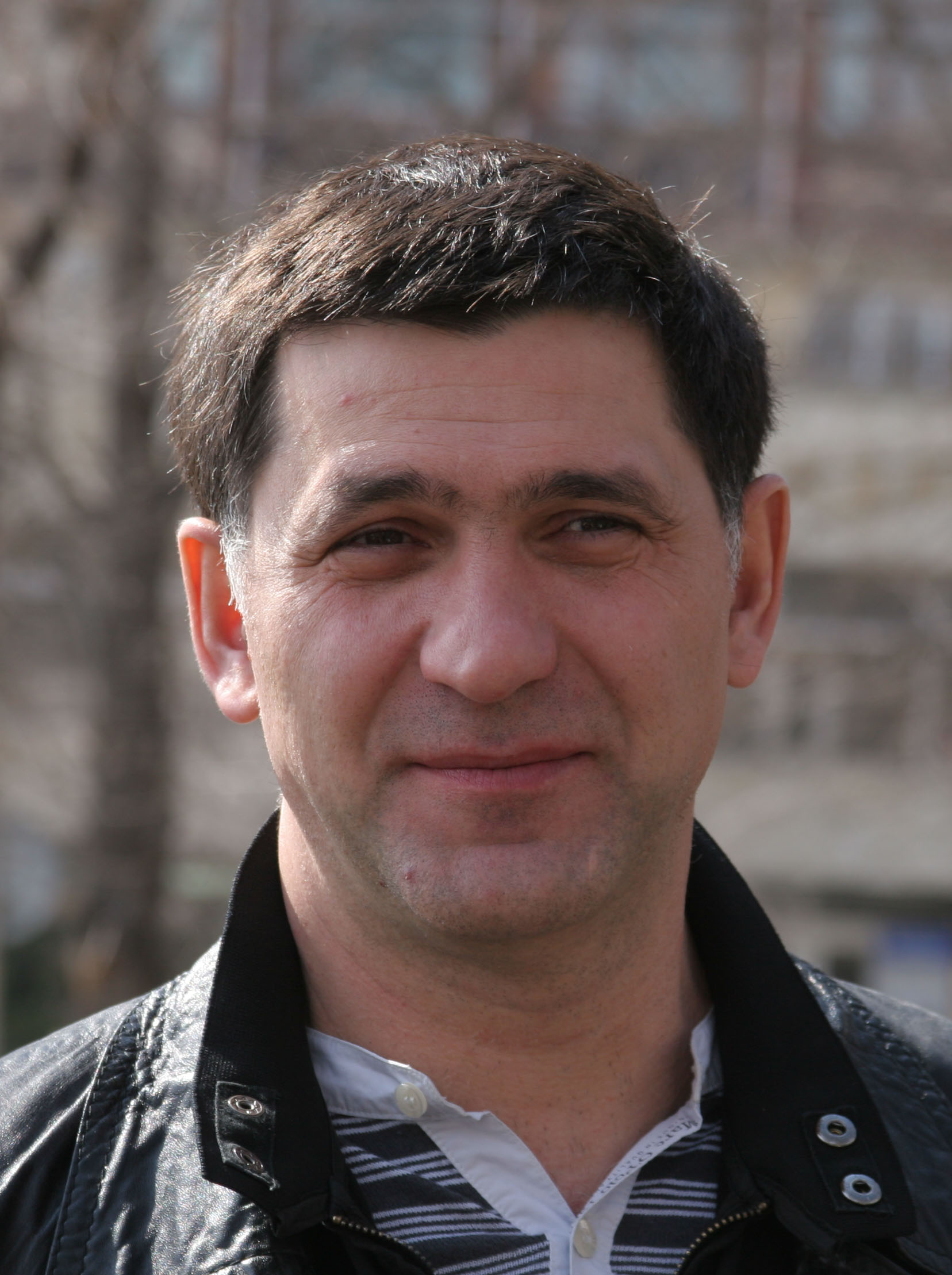
- Puskepalis outside a theater in Saratov
- Born: Sergei Vytautovich Puskepalis; 15 April 1966; Kursk, RSFSR, USSR
- Died: 20 September 2022 (aged 56); Yaroslavl Oblast, Russia
- Citizenship: Russian
- Occupations: Theatre director Film actor
- Years active: 2003–2022
- Awards: Nika Award (2008); Silver Bear (2010)
- Website: https://premiya-postupok.ru/

Sergei Vytautovich Puskepalis (Russian: Сергей Витаутович Пускепалис; 15 April 1966 – 20 September 2022) was a Russian actor and theatre director. He is best known for his roles in the award-winning movies Simple Things (2006) and How I Ended This Summer (2010), both directed by Alexei Popogrebski. For his performances, he won a Nika Award for Best Actor in 2008, as well as a Silver Bear for Best Actor at the 60th Berlin International Film Festival in 2010.

== Early life ==
Sergei Puskepalis was born in 1966 to a Lithuanian father and a Bulgarian mother from Transnistria, in Kursk, then Soviet Union.

Sergei studied in Saratov, the Saratov Drama School, then went on active duty in the Soviet Navy, worked as an actor in the Saratov Youth Theatre, studied at the Russian Institute of Theatre Arts, he graduated in 2001.

After graduating from the Moscow GITIS, he staged the play "Twenty-Seven" Alexey Slapovsky and this performance was one of the festival Baltic House. Afterwards, he put on the play by Alexey Slapovsky "From red to green rat star" in Omsk "Fifth theater". Sergei Puskepalis repeatedly staged performances of Slapovsky's plays.

He worked as a director in the Samara theater "Monday". From May 2003 to 2007 Sergei Puskepalis - chief director of the Magnitogorsk Drama Theatre named after A. S. Pushkin. 2007 - production director of the Moscow theater studio under the direction of Oleg Tabakov. From June 2009 to February 2010 - chief director of the Russian State Academic Drama Theater named after Fyodor Volkov in city of Yaroslavl.

Puskepalis was invited to many famous Russian drama theaters to stage theater productions.

== Career ==
In 2003 Puskepalis started to act in movies. His first role was a cameo in the film The Stroll. Sergei Puskepalis met the film director Alexei Popogrebski on the set of the film Roads to Koktebel, in which his son, actor Gleb Puskepalis, played. Later Popogrebski invited Sergei Puskepalis to star roles in the films Simple Things and How I Ended This Summer.

In 2015, the film Clinch which Sergei Puskepalis made as a film director had its premiere at the Yerevan International Film Festival. The picture is an adaptation of the play by Alexey Slapovsky which Sergei Puskepalis staged in Ufa.

Puskepalis was an active supporter of the 2022 Russian invasion of Ukraine.

== Personal life and death ==
Sergei Puskepalis married Elena in 1991. Their son Gleb Puskepalis was born in 1992. Sergei Puskepalis died on 20 September 2022 at the age of 56, in Yaroslavl Oblast in a car accident. He was driving an armored minibus to Donetsk, with the intention of giving it to the formations of the Donetsk People's Republic.

== Filmography ==
Year	Title	Role	Notes
2003	The Stroll		participant in the accident
2006	Simple Things	Sergei Maslov, anesthetist	
2009	Spring is Coming	Pavel Nikolaevich	
2010	Apothecary	Mikhail Streltsov	TV series
2010	How I Ended This Summer	Sergei Gulybin, head of the polar station	
2011	Siberia, Monamour	lieutenant colonel	
2011	My Boyfriend, Angel	father Sasha, volcanologist	
2011	Witness Protection	Andrei Meshechko, Major	TV series
2011	There Was Never a Better Brother	Jalil	
2012	Life and Fate	Ivan Grekov, Captain	TV series
2012	Divorce	Mikhail, Colonel police department	TV series
2013	Metro	Andrei Garin, surgeon	
2013	Owl Creek	Ivan Mitin, the captain of the State Security	TV series
2013	Eight	commander of the OMON	
2014	Black Sea	Zaytsev	
2014	Godfather	Ilya Alekhine, obstetrician-gynecologist	TV series
2015	Battle for Sevastopol	commander	
2015	Happiness is...	Oleg	
2016	The Icebreaker	Valentin Sevchenko	
2016	Sophia	Casimir IV Jagiellon	TV series
2017	Yolki 6	Viktor Orlov	
2017	Thawed Carp	Anisimov	
2017	The Road to Calvary	General Romanovsky	TV series
2021	Maria. Save Moscow	Commissioner	
2022	First Oscar	Alexander Vladimirovich Gromov	
2022	Land of Legends	Polyud	
2022	1941. Wings Over Berlin	Semyon Zhavoronkov	
2023	Doctor	Khristoforov	

aleks liutyj"]
