= Soy Nero =

2016 film

- Film poster
- Directed by: Rafi Pitts
- Written by: Rafi Pitts; Răzvan Rădulescu
- Starring: Johnny Ortiz
- Cinematography: Christos Karamanis
- Edited by: Danielle Anezin
- Music by: Rhys Chatham
- Release dates: 16 February 2016 (Berlin); 10 November 2016 (Germany)
- Running time: 120 minutes
- Countries: Germany; France; Mexico
- Language: Spanish

Soy Nero is a 2016 internationally co-produced drama film directed by Rafi Pitts. It was selected to compete for the Golden Bear at the 66th Berlin International Film Festival. The film won the Best Film Award at the 12th Bucharest International Film Festival held in April 2016.

== Cast ==
- Johnny Ortiz as Nero
- Rory Cochrane as Sgt. McCloud
- Khleo Thomas as Mohammed
- Aml Ameen as Bronx
- Michael Harney as Seymour
- Joel McKinnon Miller as Sgt. Frank White
- Darrell Britt-Gibson as Private Compton
- Alex Frost as Beverly Hills Police Officer
- Richard Portnow as Murray
- Rosa Frausto as Merecedes
