= Anselm (film) =

2023 film by Wim Wenders

- Theatrical release poster
- German: Anselm – Das Rauschen der Zeit
- Directed by: Wim Wenders
- Produced by: Karsten Brünig; Wim Wenders
- Starring: Anselm Kiefer; Daniel Kiefer; Anton Wenders
- Cinematography: Franz Lustig
- Edited by: Maxine Goedicke
- Music by: Leonard Küßner
- Production company: Road Movies
- Distributed by: DCM
- Release dates: 17 May 2023 (Cannes); 12 October 2023 (Germany)
- Running time: 93 minutes
- Country: Germany
- Language: German
- Box office: $1.8 million

Anselm (German: Anselm – Das Rauschen der Zeit) is a 2023 German 3D documentary film directed by Wim Wenders, chronicling the art of German painter and sculptor Anselm Kiefer. The film had its world premiere at the 76th Cannes Film Festival on 17 May 2023 as a special screening, where it competed for the L'Œil d'or.

== Synopsis ==
The film opens with footage of some of Kiefer's creations inside natural environments - including dresses with tree branches, sticks and glass shards; he has also made some towers out of wall fragments of destroyed rooms.

It shows the artist riding a bicycle around a large warehouse outside of Paris that contains many of his works. After a musical montage, the film depicts the artist's childhood drawing houses. Poetry written by Paul Celan, a Ukrainian Jew who was persecuted during the Holocaust, is read out loud, the film features historic recordings by Celan himself.

Kiefer shows a book with progressively darker paintings symbolizing the progression of brain cancer in philosopher Heidegger. Footage is shown of Kiefer making a huge painting, to which he has attached He has attached dead leaves and crops. He torches these to create a burnt edge. His crew extinguish the flames immediately after. The finished products are half-burnt, and he has made a collection of them.

In the winter, Kiefer goes to a field and a forest, where he takes pictures with an analog camera, obtaining inspiration for his next paintings. He takes more pictures and draws more paintings inside an attic, with the film juxtaposing his current work with archival footage of what he did in the 1970s and 80s. In the 1980s, while representing Germany at international competitions, his work was criticized for how his paintings invoked the German legendary heroes whom the Nazis had glorified.

After looking through some books, he paints an enormous mural of a winter field with some creeks. In the 1990s, he spends time doing aerial photography of various regions of Earth, making enormous books with printouts of the images and building an oversized library with them. Analysts claim he wants his work to grapple with Germany's past, described as an "open wound."

In the 1960s he traveled around Europe taking pictures of himself doing the Nazi Salute in front of various European monuments in Nazi-occupied territories. He says it was to educate people about it. In his childhood he read stories about Greek Argonaut mythology. In 1990, after exhibitions in America, he built huge models of historic German warplanes as the Gulf War was breaking out.

Two years later, he and his team moved to a new studio and 200-acre property in the south of France. There he created huge installations of ruined building towers, in addition to enormous warehouses which housed other installations and works in progress. ith all of his works.

The next few scenes juxtapose his younger self playing in enormous mansions and discovering his older self's work, with his older self traveling around aimlessly. This is until they both find themselves in the same room where his younger self reads poetry from the same book as at the beginning of the film. Carrying his younger self to the edge of a lake, his older self remarks, "Childhood is an empty room like the beginning of the world." An old man, standing in front of an art creation, disappears from existence.

== Cast ==
- Anselm Kiefer as Anselm
- Daniel Kiefer as Anselm (young man)
- Anton Wenders as Anselm (child)

== Production ==
Described as "immersive", the film focuses on painter and sculptor Anselm Kiefer. The project illuminates his work, life journey, inspiration, creative process, and the artist's fascination with myth and history. The aim is to "blur" the boundary between film and painting.

Karsten Brünig produced the documentary for Road Movies Filmproduktion.

Wenders shot the film at 6K resolution and in the 3D format, which he previously utilized for his 2011 documentary Pina. It was shot over the course of two years, in Germany, France and Italy. Wenders called the film "a labor of love and turned out to take seven shooting periods and altogether three years to become a film like nothing I've ever done before. I think we stretched the possibilities of 3D into an unknown territory."

== Release ==
Anselm was selected to be screened in the Special Screenings section at the 76th Cannes Film Festival, where it had its world premiere on 17 May 2023. On the same occasion, Wenders also received an invitation to the festival's main competition for his feature film Perfect Days.

World sales were acquired by HanWay Films. DCM Film Distribution secured the distribution rights for Germany, Austria and Switzerland. It was also invited at the 28th Busan International Film Festival in 'Icon' section and was screened on 6 October 2023.

Anselm was theatrically released in Germany by DCM on 12 October 2023, and in France by Les Films du Losange on 18 October 2023. U.S. distribution rights were acquired by Sideshow and Janus Films.

== Reception ==
=== Critical response ===
On Rotten Tomatoes, the film holds an approval rating of 98% based on 55 reviews, with an average rating of 7.6/10. The website's critics consensus reads, "Visually thrilling and refreshingly unconventional, Anselm pays mesmerizing tribute to a brilliant artist's life and legacy." On Metacritic, the film has a weighted average score of 82 out of 100, based on 24 critic reviews, indicating "universal acclaim".

=== Awards and nominations ===
Award	Date of ceremony	Category	Recipient(s)	Result	Ref.
Cannes Film Festival	27 May 2023	L'Œil d'or	Wim Wenders	Nominated	
CineLibri	20 October 2023	Best Documentary	Wim Wenders	Won	
German Film Award	3 May 2024	Best Documentary	Karsten Brünig, Wim Wenders	Nominated	
IDA Documentary Awards	12 December 2023	Best Cinematography	Franz Lustig	Nominated	
IDA Documentary Awards	12 December 2023	Best Original Music Score	Leonard Küßner	Won	
