= I'll Be Gone in June =

2026 coming-of-age film by Katharina Rivilis

- Directed by: Katharina Rivilis
- Written by: Katharina Rivilis
- Produced by: Léa Germain; Clemens Köstlin; Katharina Rivilis; Andrea Kühnel; Vincent Savino; Wim Wenders
- Starring: Naomi Cosma; David Flores; Bianca Dumais; Logan Sage
- Cinematography: Giulia Schelhas
- Edited by: Aurora Franco Vögeli
- Music by: Steve Binetti; Eliane Bründler
- Production companies: Road Movies Filmproduktion; Wolfskind Films; Film Science; 8horses
- Distributed by: DCM (Germany and Switzerland)
- Release date: 17 May 2026 (Cannes)
- Running time: 125 minutes
- Countries: United States; Germany; Switzerland
- Languages: English; German

I'll Be Gone in June is a 2026 coming-of-age drama road movie written and directed by Katharina Rivilis, in her directorial debut. It stars Naomi Cosma as Franny, a German exchange student navigating life in New Mexico.

The film had its world premiere in the Un Certain Regard section of the 2026 Cannes Film Festival on 17 May, where it was nominated for the Caméra d'Or.

== Premise ==
It’s 2001, and 16-year-old Franny from Germany dreams of experiencing America as an exchange student. She had imagined the glamour of New York, but instead finds herself in a sleepy desert town in New Mexico in the haunting days after 9/11.

== Cast ==
- Naomi Cosma as Franny
- David Flores as Elliott
- Rebecca Schulz as Ida
- Bianca Dumais as Sam
- Logan Sage as Craig
- Kendall Myers as Patty
- Jazmine Olague as Robin Garcia
- William Lujan as Tony Garcia
- Consuelo Maria Flores as Eve Garcia
- Elizabeth Briske as Lizzie Richardson
- William Beck as William Richardson
- Elijah De Billie as Elijah

== Production ==
=== Development ===
In March 2021, the project was presented at the Sofia Meetings and won the special mention of Mediterranean Film Institute Award. In July 2021, Rivilis participated at the MFI Script 2 Film Workshops to develop the screenplay. In February 2023, the project was selected to participate at the Berlinale Co-Production Market. In November 2023, it received a €300,000 production grant from Eurimages. In September 2024, the project participated at the European Work in Progress. It won the Way Film Award, which included €5,000 in subtitling services. In September 2025, it participated at the C EU Soon section of the Mercato Internazionale Audiovisivo in Rome, Italy.

I’ll Be Gone in June is produced by Wim Wenders and Léa Germain for Berlin-based Road Movies Filmproduktion and Clemens Köstlin and Katharina Rivilis for Wolfskind Films, and Andrea Kühnel and Vincent Savino, in co-production Simon Jaquemet and Olga Lamontanara for Zurich-based 8Horses. The film was executive produced by Lauren Melinda, Helena Sardinha and Rafael Thomaseto for Simbelle Productions, and Anish Savino and Neil Kopp for FilmScience. Both companies were associated with the production. The film was supported by Creative Europe – MEDIA, Eurimages, Medienboard Berlin-Brandenburg, HessenFilm, Filmförderungsanstalt and the Swiss Federal Office of Culture.

=== Filming ===
Principal photography took place in Las Cruces, New Mexico in March 2024. Italian cinematographer Giulia Schelhas served as director of photography.

== Release ==
I'll Be Gone in June had its world premiere at the 2026 Cannes Film Festival at the Un Certain Regard section. The German and Swiss distribution will be handled by DCM.
