= Birthday Girl (2001 film) =

2001 British comedy thriller film directed by Jez Butterworth

- Theatrical release poster
- Directed by: Jez Butterworth
- Written by: Tom Butterworth; Jez Butterworth
- Produced by: Steve Butterworth; Diana Phillips
- Starring: Nicole Kidman; Ben Chaplin
- Cinematography: Oliver Stapleton
- Edited by: Christopher Tellefsen
- Music by: Stephen Warbeck
- Production companies: HAL Films; FilmFour Productions
- Distributed by: Miramax Films (United States); FilmFour Distributors (United Kingdom)
- Release dates: 6 September 2001 (Venice); 1 February 2002 (United States); 28 June 2002 (United Kingdom)
- Running time: 93 minutes
- Countries: United Kingdom; United States
- Languages: English; Russian
- Budget: $13 million
- Box office: $16.2 million

Birthday Girl is a 2001 erotic comedy thriller film directed by Jez Butterworth. The plot focuses on English bank clerk John Buckingham, who orders a Russian mail-order bride, Nadia. It becomes clear upon her arrival that Nadia cannot speak English, and early into her stay, two mysterious men come to the house claiming to be her cousin and cousin's friend. The film features Nicole Kidman, Ben Chaplin, Mathieu Kassovitz, and Vincent Cassel. English and Russian are spoken interchangeably in the film.

== Plot ==
John Buckingham, an introverted, lonely St Albans bank clerk, orders a mail-order bride, Nadia, from Russia on the Internet. John is uncomfortable and shy, but Nadia is sexually bold.

Although Nadia cannot speak English and John cannot speak Russian, they soon bond. Later on, a man she introduces as her cousin Yuri and his friend Alexei turn up to celebrate her birthday. Alexei soon shows that he has a temper.

After a violent altercation, Alexei holds Nadia hostage and demands a ransom from John. As he has grown to care for Nadia, he is forced to steal from the bank where he has worked for ten years. After the ransom is paid, he realises that he has been the victim of an elaborate con. Nadia, Yuri, and Alexei are criminals, and Alexei is actually Nadia's boyfriend.

The trio have carried out the same scam on men from Switzerland, Greece, Italy and Germany. They take John prisoner, strip him down to his underpants, and tie him to a toilet in a motel. He eventually frees himself and quickly learns that Nadia has been left behind after Alexei discovers she is pregnant. John gets dressed and subsequently fights with her. She later reveals that she can indeed speak English and that her name is not Nadia.

John takes Nadia to turn her into the police, hoping to clear his name as a wanted bank robber. Ultimately, however, he sympathises with her and decides against it. He leaves her at the airport, where she is kidnapped by Alexei, who now wants Nadia to have the baby. John rescues her, tying Alexei to a chair. They work together against the two Russian men. Nadia tells John that her real name is Sophia. John, disguised as Alexei, leaves for Russia with her.

== Cast ==
- Nicole Kidman as Sophia/Nadia
- Ben Chaplin as John Buckingham
- Vincent Cassel as Alexei
- Mathieu Kassovitz as Yuri
- Kate Evans as Clare
- Stephen Mangan as Bank Manager
- Xander Armstrong as Robert Moseley
- Sally Phillips as Karen
- Jo McInnes as Waitress
- Ben Miller as Concierge
- Jonathan Aris as D.I. O'Fetiger
- Steve Pemberton as Duty Sergeant
- Reece Shearsmith as Porter
- Mark Gatiss as Porter

== Release ==
=== Box office ===
The film grossed $16,171,098.

=== Critical reception ===
It has a 59% approval on Rotten Tomatoes with an average rating of 5.72/10, indicating a mixed critical reception. The website's critics consensus reads, "Kidman shows her range in this quirky movie, but the shift in tone from romantic comedy to thriller may leave viewers unsatisfied." Metacritic, which uses a weighted average, assigned the film a score of 51 out of 100, based on 32 critics, indicating "mixed or average" reviews. Audiences polled by CinemaScore gave the film an average grade of "C" on an A+ to F scale.

Jason Solomon of The Observer praised the casting "Cassel, Kassovitz and Kidman are beautifully graceful against the backdrop of signs to Tring and Newbury." He continued "The comedy here is gentle, formed of linguistic misunderstandings and cultural clashes and Chaplin's constant efforts to be polite are rather charming. Kidman's exoticism, encapsulated by her peasant-chic wardrobe, is fresh air in St Albans."

BBC reviewer Matt Arnoldi gave the film four out of five stars, praised Chaplin's and Kidman's "infectious performances", and described it as a "sparky" and "deviant topical comedy which is funny from start to finish."

CNN praised Kidman's "astounding range" and applauded the dialogue as "often sharp, scathingly witty, and displays a wry intelligence."

The New York Times described the film as "competent" but decried the plot as too "insubstantial".
