= Simple Things (film) =

- Russian: Простые вещи
- Directed by: Alexei Popogrebski
- Written by: Alexei Popogrebski
- Produced by: Roman Borisevich; Mikhail Kolodyazhny
- Starring: Sergei Puskepalis; Leonid Bronevoy
- Cinematography: Pavel Kostomarov; Marina Gornostaeva
- Edited by: Ivan Lebedev
- Music by: Dmitriy Katkhanov
- Production company: Koktebel Film Company
- Release date: 7 June 2007
- Running time: 115 minutes
- Country: Russia
- Language: Russian

Simple Things (Russian: Простые вещи, translit. Prosty'e veshchi) is a 2007 Russian comedy-drama film. Written and directed by Alexei Popogrebski, the film stars Sergei Puskepalis and Leonid Bronevoy.

The film was nominated for the Golden Eagle Award for Best Motion Picture and won Best Screenplay. Popogrebski and Bronevoy were also nominated for Best Director and Best Supporting Actor, respectively. Bronevoy also won a Nika Award for Best Supporting Actor.

A dying actor (Bronevoy) asks a doctor (Puskepalis) to help him commit suicide in exchange for a painting masterpiece.

== Plot ==
Dr. Sergey Maslov, a struggling anesthesiologist in Saint Petersburg, faces a cascade of troubles. A failed surgery, personal complications with a nurse, and a suspended driver’s license compound his problems, while his daughter runs away, and his wife insists on having a baby despite their crowded communal apartment. Sergey is then offered a job administering home pain relief to Vladimir Zhuravlyov, a once-popular actor. Zhuravlyov, grumpy but sincere, bonds with Sergey and offers him a valuable painting if he agrees to assist in his euthanasia. Initially refusing, Sergey later agrees but gives only a sedative. Upon appraisal, the painting proves nearly worthless, sparking frustration that draws police attention. Zhuravlyov, alive and coherent, clears the situation, and the two reconcile, dismissing their shared burdens.

Later, Sergey spots his daughter on the street, rushes after her, and is hit by a car. Waking in her boyfriend Pyotr’s apartment, he makes peace with their relationship and impending child. In the final scene, Sergey and Pyotr sit together, awaiting their pregnant partners at a playground.

== Cast ==
- Sergei Puskepalis as Sergei Maslov
- Leonid Bronevoy as Zhuravlyov
- Svetlana Kamynina as Katya
- Dinara Kutuyeva as Lena
- Ivan Osipov as Pyotr
- Malkhaz Zhvaniya as Georgy
- Gennadi Bogachyov as Psaryov
