= HAL Films =

British film production company

HAL Films was a short-lived British film production company, created in October 1997 and dissolved in 2012, although trading stopped in 2000.

== History ==
The company was set up by two former managers at Channel 4, Head of Film David Aukin and Director of Film Acquisition Colin Leventhal, together with former Miramax executive Petrea "Trea" Hoving (later Leventhal), and was financed by Miramax Films. The company name was created from the three founders' last names initials: Hoving, Aukin and Leventhal. At the launch, Miramax Films co-chairman Harvey Weinstein called the managers behind HAL Films "the European dream team", and the company replaced Miramax's London production office.

The company was involved in the production of four feature films:

- Elephant Juice (1999)
- Mansfield Park (1999)
- About Adam (2000)
- Birthday Girl (2001)

In February 2000 it was announced that Miramax would no longer support the company, and that Aukin and Leventhal would pursue other "interests in the entertainment industry", while Hoving, who had married Leventhal in the meantime, would devote her time to the family.

According to industry newspaper Variety, the reason for the split was a growing disagreement between the three managers in London and the Miramax management in New York. Following the decision, Miramax took over the London premises under its own name.
