= Road Movies Filmproduktion =

German film production company

Road Movies Filmproduktion is a German film production company formed by Wim Wenders in 1977.

Up until the 1990s, Road Movies acted as a producer of Wenders' own films. Well-known films of this time include Wings of Desire or Until the End of the World. Since the early 1990s, Road Movies has also co-produced many European productions. Under the leadership of Wenders' partner Ulrich Felsberg, many projects that are still well known today, such as Bread and Roses (2000 film) or Bend It Like Beckham, were co-financed. The expansion of activities led to Road Movies becoming the Road Movies Group, in which individual companies took care of rights exploitation, production and distribution of films.

During the Internet boom around the turn of the millennium, Wenders decided, together with his partner Ulrich Felsberg, to sell Road Movies to Das Werk AG, in return for which he received a twenty percent share in Das Werk.

After the insolvency of Das Werk in 2003, Wenders' entire rights library was stuck in the insolvency estate of Das Werk. Only after the conclusion of the insolvency proceedings were these rights acquired via a Hamburg production company that belonged to a friend of Wenders' and finally returned to Wenders.

Documentary films have always played an important role for Road Movies, including award-winning productions like Buena Vista Social Club, Pina, and most recently A Black Jesus by Luca Lucchesi. Furthermore, the company has become a leader in 3D technologies with the production of three feature-length films in this format. Wim Wenders' installation Two or Three Things I Know About Edward Hopper at the Beyeler Foundation (Riehen/Basel) in 2020 demonstrated the effectiveness of this technology as a tool for storytelling within a museum setting.

Road Movies is located in Berlin Mitte, inside the building complex of the old "Königstadt Brewery". It shares its office space with the Wenders Images (the photo studio by Wim and Donata Wenders) and the Wim Wenders Stiftung, a foundation which is based in Düsseldorf. Part of its administrative work, the restoration and digitization of Wim Wenders' cinematic work, is carried out from Berlin.

== Filmography ==
- 1977 - The American Friend
- 1978 - The Left-Handed Woman
- 1979 - ...als Diesel geboren
- 1980 - Lightning Over Water
- 1980 - Radio On
- 1980 - Die Kinder aus Nr. 67
- 1982 - The State of Things
- 1984 - Chinese Boxes
- 1984 - Paris, Texas
- 1984 - Flight to Berlin
- 1986 - Paradise
- 1986 - The Rose King
- 1987 - Anita: Dances of Vice
- 1987 - Wings of Desire
- 1987 - Iron Earth, Copper Sky
- 1988 - The Passenger – Welcome to Germany
- 1989 - Notebook on Cities and Clothes
- 1991 - Until the End of the World
- 1993 - The Absence
- 1993 - Madregilda
- 1993 - Faraway, So Close!
- 1994 - Lisbon Story
- 1994 - Alta marea
- 1997 - The End of Violence
- 1997 - Forever and Ever
- 1998 - Ristiinnaulittu vapaus
- 1998 - Don Juan
- 1999 - Buena Vista Social Club
- 2000 - Princesa
- 2000 - My Generation
- 2000 - Liam
- 2000 - Gangster No. 1
- 2000 - Lista de espera
- 2000 - Bread and Roses
- 2000 - Nora
- 2000 - The Million Dollar Hotel
- 2001 - Buñuel y la mesa del rey Salomón
- 2001 - The Navigators
- 2001 - Me Without You
- 2001 - Dead by Monday
- 2002 - Junimond
- 2002 - 24 Hours in the Life of a Woman
- 2002 - Ten Minutes Older: The Cello
- 2002 - Sweet Sixteen
- 2002 - Two
- 2002 - Ten Minutes Older: The Trumpet
- 2002 - Bend It Like Beckham
- 2003 - The Blues
- 2003 - The Soul of a Man
- 2005 - Don't Come Knocking

=== Under the name Neue Road Movies ===
- 2008 – Palermo Shooting
- 2010 – If Buildings Could Talk
- 2011 – Pina
- 2011 – Ungerechte Welt
- 2012 – Notes From a Day in the Life of an Architect
- 2013 – Only Lovers Left Alive
- 2013 – Lupu
- 2014 – Cathedrals of Culture (Digital 3D)
- 2015 – Dirk Ohm
- 2015 – Every Thing Will Be Fine
- 2016 – The Beautiful Days of Aranjuez
- 2017 – Submergence
- 2016 – It Must Schwing - The Blue Note Story
- 2018 – Pope Francis: A Man of His Word

=== Road Movies (2019-) ===
- 2020 – A Black Jesus
- 2020 – Two or Three Things I Know About Edward Hopper
- 2021 – Souad
- 2022 – Rondo (short)
- 2023 – An Endless Sunday
- 2023 – Anselm
- 2026 – I'll Be Gone in June
