= Glasgow Film Office =

Film Commission

Glasgow Film Office (GFO) is the film commission for Glasgow, Scotland, tasked with supporting all productions wanting to film in the city. The office was established in 1997 for Glasgow City Council to support the logistical needs of film and television production.

In 1997, Glasgow City Council and Strathclyde Police signed the Film Charter for the City of Glasgow, which ensures that productions filming in the city have co-operation from filming liaison officers in Glasgow City Council departments and the Police. GFO also grants location agreements for Council owned property and liaises with other public sector organisations.

GFO also maintains an online database of locations to assist location managers looking for specific filming locations.
