= Alexei Popogrebski =

Russian film director

Alexei Popogrebsky
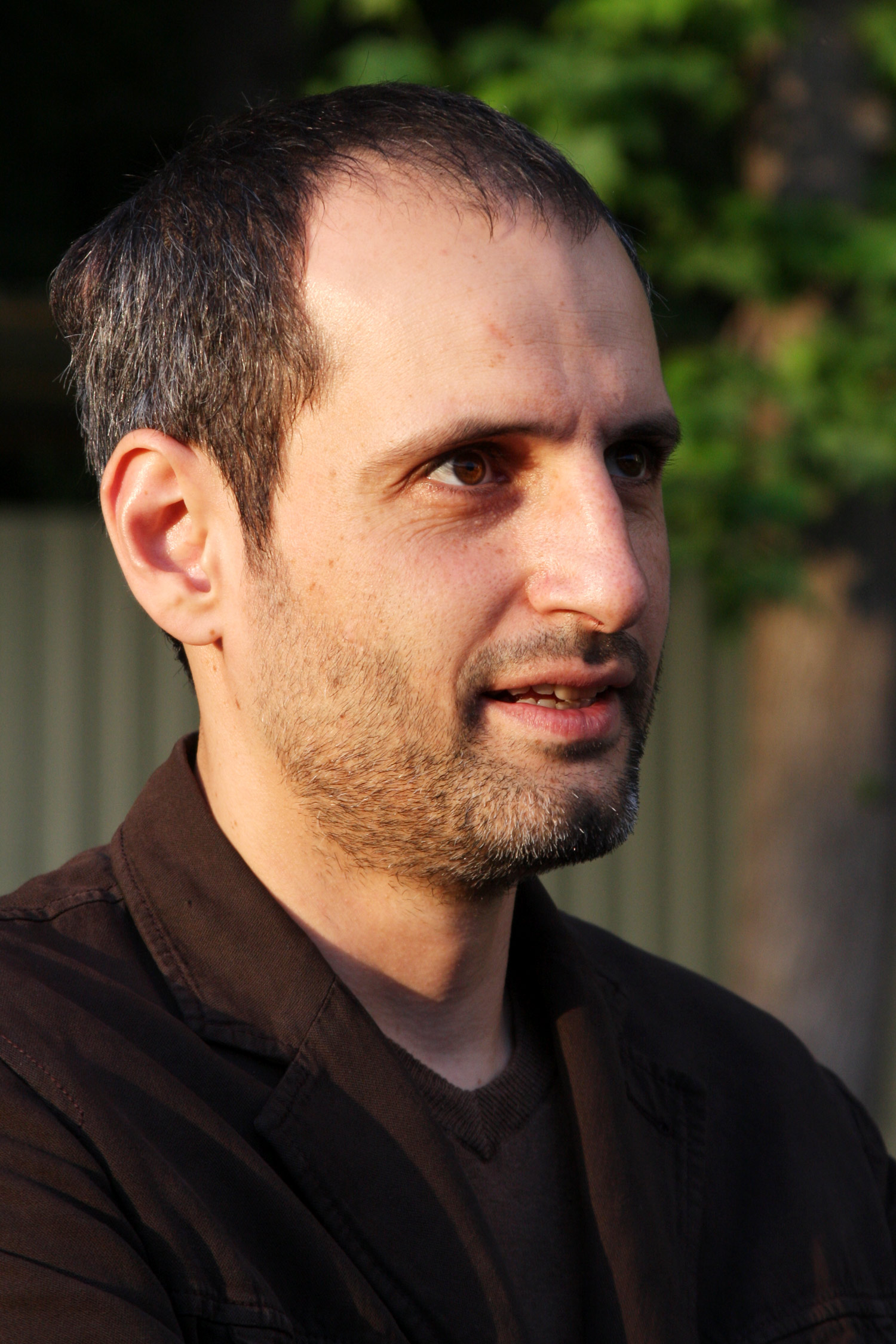
- Popogrebsky in 2010
- Born: 7 August 1972 (age 53); Moscow, Soviet Union
- Occupations: Film director, screenwriter
- Years active: 2003-present

Alexei Petrovich Popogrebsky (Russian: Алексе́й Петро́вич Попогре́бский; born 7 August 1972) is a Russian film director and screenwriter. His 2010 film How I Ended This Summer was nominated for the Golden Bear at the 60th Berlin International Film Festival, and won Best Film at the 2010 London Film Festival Awards.

== Filmography ==
- Roads to Koktebel (2003)
- Simple Things (2007)
- How I Ended This Summer (2010)

== Television ==
- The Optimists (2017; original title: Оптимисты)
