= A Most Wanted Man (novel) =

2008 novel by John le Carré

- First edition
- Author: John le Carré
- Language: English
- Publisher: Hodder & Stoughton
- Publication date: 23 September 2008
- Publication place: United Kingdom
- Media type: Print (hardcover)
- Pages: 336
- ISBN: 1-416-59488-4
- LC Class: PR6062.E33 L43 2008

A Most Wanted Man is a thriller/espionage novel by British writer John le Carré, published in September 2008 by Hodder & Stoughton in the United Kingdom and in October 2008 by Scribner in the United States.

A young Chechen ex-prisoner arrives illegally in Germany, practically uneducated and destitute, but with a claim to a fortune held in a private bank. This novel, set in Hamburg where the author was once a British agent and consul, is based on the contemporary themes of the international war on terror, money laundering, and the conflicting interests of different officers and agents and laymen who are affected.

The novel provides an extended, if oblique, critique of the American policy under President George W. Bush of extraordinary rendition. The novel's events and characters were inspired by the real-life story of Murat Kurnaz, a Turkish citizen and legal resident of Germany who, after being arrested in Pakistan in 2001, was detained and tortured in American military detention camps, first at Kandahar in Afghanistan and then at Guantanamo Bay in Cuba, before being released in 2006.

== Plot summary ==
A young Turkish boxing champion in Hamburg notices he is being shadowed by a tall gaunt young man in a black coat, who turns up on his doorstep and demands hospitality. Somewhat suspiciously, they allow Issa to stay in the attic as he announces his desire to become a doctor. He contacts a human rights organisation whose attractive young bike-riding lawyer, Annabel Richter, takes his case to a British bank in the city. She bases her case to the owner, Tommy Brue, on a mysterious Lippizaner fund established by his father and held by the bank. When Brue meets Issa, he claims he is the son of a Russian, Colonel Karpov, who put his money in the fund, but after Brue's grilling, he refuses to claim his inheritance. Brue, who by this time is falling under Annabel's spell, gives her a large personal cheque to cover expenses.

Brue receives visits from British intelligence who tell him that they had set up the bank accounts, which received payoffs and money from mafia sources. They ask him to alert them when Issa shows up. A German intelligence agent, Bachmann, who visits Annabel, is homing in on a suspicious Islamist terrorist with Chechen connections, arrested entering Sweden from Turkey in a container, who has escaped custody and found his way to Germany. Annabel has moved Issa from the Turkish family to a new apartment she has recently bought but not occupied, but her evasive tactics seem suspicious to the followers. She is later apprehended in the street, interrogated by Bachmann, and a woman in the intelligence service is assigned to persuade Annabel to co-operate with them. Eventually she agrees on the basis that her client will be given a German passport and be allowed to stay.

They suggest to Annabel that Issa might be persuaded to give the money to an Islamic philanthropist called Abdullah who will give the money to charitable causes, which will include his medical training. The intelligence services are trying to link Abdullah to funding terrorism. Issa remains in Annabel's apartment whilst she tries to persuade him. Meanwhile, the British agents get a promise of co-operation from Brue ahead of a meeting of the intelligence services.

At the meeting of the Joint Committee of German authorities which has a representative of British intelligence, there are also two CIA operatives present as 'observers'. The case against Signpost, as Abdullah is referred to, is discussed. While his religion and most of the donations are deemed legitimate, attention focuses on a small transport company which seems to siphon off a small part of the shipments of food he organises, to be allegedly sold to aid terrorists. They discuss the fate of Issa and agree that they should keep the promises given to his lawyer. But the handover at the bank will be monitored by a large number of police and others on the assumption that he will be armed.

On the appointed day, Annabel and Issa meet Brue at the bank and Issa produces the key to the safe deposit box which contains the crucial documents. They complete the handover and Abdullah signs off on transmittal of the money to the organisations involved, including the suspect transport company. The spies who have bugged the scene have all the evidence they need to link Abdullah to the terrorist organization. As Abdullah leaves, Bachmann arrives disguised as a taxi-driver to apprehend Abdullah. As he pulls away, the taxi is boxed in by several vehicles and a group of masked men jump out of a van, grabbing and leaving with both Abdullah and Issa. "Justice has been rendered, man. American justice," says Newton, one of the American spooks who has appeared, "have you never heard of extraordinary rendition?"

== Film treatments ==
A nine-minute short film detailing the themes of the book was released on 22 July 2008, produced by Simon Channing-Williams, producer of the film version of Le Carré's 19th novel, The Constant Gardener.

A feature film adaptation was announced in June 2011 in Germany, with Anton Corbijn as director. Australian screenwriter Andrew Bovell adapted the novel for the screen. The film was granted US$1.3 million (€900,000) in production subsidies from Hamburg's regional film board, the FFHSH (Filmförderung ("film promotion") Hamburg Schleswig-Holstein), and the city was the primary production location. Malte Grunert's recently launched Hamburg- and Berlin-based Amusement Park Films produced the film. The film, starring Philip Seymour Hoffman (in his final role), premiered at the Sundance Film Festival on 19 January 2014, before release in the United States on 25 July, and the United Kingdom on 5 September.
