= A Most Wanted Man (film) =

2014 international spy thriller drama film by Anton Corbijn

- Theatrical release poster
- Directed by: Anton Corbijn
- Screenplay by: Andrew Bovell
- Based on: A Most Wanted Man by John le Carré
- Produced by: Stephen Cornwell; Gail Egan; Malte Grunert; Simon Cornwell; Andrea Calderwood
- Starring: Philip Seymour Hoffman; Rachel McAdams; Willem Dafoe; Robin Wright; Grigoriy Dobrygin; Homayoun Ershadi; Nina Hoss; Daniel Brühl
- Cinematography: Benoît Delhomme
- Edited by: Claire Simpson
- Music by: Herbert Grönemeyer
- Production companies: Film4 Productions; Demarest Films; Senator Film; Potboiler Productions; The Ink Factory
- Distributed by: Entertainment One Films (United Kingdom); Roadside Attractions; Lionsgate (United States); Senator Film (Germany)
- Release dates: 19 January 2014 (Sundance); 25 July 2014 (United States); 5 September 2014 (United Kingdom)
- Running time: 122 minutes
- Countries: United Kingdom; United States; Germany
- Language: English
- Budget: $15 million
- Box office: $36.2 million

A Most Wanted Man is a 2014 espionage thriller film based on the 2008 novel by John le Carré, directed by Anton Corbijn and written by Andrew Bovell. The film stars Philip Seymour Hoffman, Rachel McAdams, Willem Dafoe, Robin Wright, Grigoriy Dobrygin, Homayoun Ershadi, Daniel Brühl and Nina Hoss. It premiered at the 2014 Sundance Film Festival and competed in the main competition section of the 36th Moscow International Film Festival and the 40th Deauville American Film Festival.

== Plot ==
Issa Karpov, a political refugee from Chechnya, who has been tortured by Russian security forces, illegally enters Hamburg, Germany.

Günther Bachmann leads a covert German government team that seeks to recruit local informants with ties to Islamic terrorist organizations. The disheveled Günther's polar opposite is his efficient right-hand associate, Irna Frey. The team learns of Karpov's presence and his suspected links to Chechen terrorists.

Bachmann's team is also tracking the activities of a local, respected, Muslim philanthropist, Dr. Abdullah, who the team suspects is funneling a small portion of his legitimate funds to al-Qaeda, though the team is unable to prove this. High-ranking German security official Mohr and American diplomatic attaché Sullivan both learn of these investigations and take an interest.

Bachmann is interested in watching suspects and "turning" informants higher and higher up the chain while protecting the naïve who are caught up in the nefarious affairs of others. Mohr and Sullivan appear single-minded and interested in merely capturing suspects, regardless of guilt or future usefulness. In the past, Bachmann was held responsible for a serious intelligence failure; although he shows signs of self-neglect, he appears to be a sophisticated operative who understands his trade and Islamic terrorism. He distrusts politicians and American intelligence agents.

Karpov contacts an immigration lawyer, Annabel Richter, who helps put him in contact with Tommy Brue, a wealthy banker whose father had long ago done a favor for Karpov's father. Karpov shows Brue a letter from Brue's father to Karpov's, along with the key to a safe deposit box, and asks for Brue's help. The favour Brue's father did for Karpov, a member of the Russian mafia, is revealed to be money laundering. Karpov is informed that he is the legal heir to a multi-million-euro account long held by Brue's bank. Karpov identifies with his maternal Chechen and Muslim heritage, considers the money unclean, and indicates that he does not want it.

Bachmann's team is able to turn Brue and Richter to their cause. At the behest of Bachmann, Richter convinces Karpov to donate the funds to Abdullah's organization, in the hope that Abdullah will reroute some of the funds to a shipping company acting as a front for al-Qaeda. Bachmann plans to use this proof of guilt to turn Abdullah and ensnare those higher up in the terrorist organization. The plan is approved by the interior minister and supported by Sullivan, who has become an apparent ally of Bachmann. Bachmann secures asylum for the innocent Karpov.

During the fund transfer at Brue's bank, Abdullah does indeed route funds to the shipping company. Bachmann, posing as a taxi driver, picks up Abdullah intending to turn him into an informant without disrupting his life or family. As Bachmann is about to drive away, he is ambushed by agents reporting to Mohr and Sullivan, who handcuff Abdullah and Karpov and whisk them away. Bachmann yells in anger as Frey, Richter, and Brue look on in shock. Bachmann drives off, furious and defeated, but displaying his characteristic grizzled determination.

== Cast ==
- Philip Seymour Hoffman as Günther Bachmann, an intelligence officer who leads an anti-terror unit
- Rachel McAdams as Annabel Richter, an immigration lawyer
- Willem Dafoe as Tommy Brue, a banker
- Robin Wright as Martha Sullivan, a CIA Agent at the U.S. Embassy in Berlin
- Grigoriy Dobrygin as Issa Karpov, a Chechnyan refugee and suspected terrorist
- Derya Alabora as Leyla
- Daniel Brühl as Max, an intelligence officer in Günther's team
- Nina Hoss as Irna Frey, an intelligence officer in Günther's team
- Herbert Grönemeyer as Michael Axelrod
- Martin Wuttke as Erhardt
- Kostja Ullmann as Rasheed
- Homayoun Ershadi as Dr. Faisal Abdullah, a philanthropist, suspected of funneling funds to terrorist organizations
- Mehdi Dehbi as Jamal Abdullah, an informant
- Vicky Krieps as Niki
- Rainer Bock as Dieter Mohr
- Tamer Yiğit as Melik Oktay

== Production ==
Principal photography took place in Hamburg, Germany in September 2012.

== Release ==
In July 2013, Lionsgate acquired the US distribution rights to the film. On 11 April 2014, the first trailer for the film was released. A new trailer for the UK was revealed on 30 June. On 25 July 2014, the film received a limited release in the United States, beginning with 361 theatres and later expanding wider. It earned US$36,233,517 worldwide.

== Reception ==
On review aggregator Rotten Tomatoes, the film holds an approval rating of 86% based on 197 reviews, with an average rating of 7.3/10. The site's critical consensus reads, "Smart, subtle, and steadily absorbing, A Most Wanted Man proves once again that John le Carré books make for sharp, thoughtful thrillers." On Metacritic, the film has a weighted average score of 73 out of 100, based on 42 critics, indicating "generally favorable reviews".

Many critics praised Hoffman's performance, which was his last leading role before his death in February 2014. Richard Roeper called the film one of the best spy thrillers in recent years and called it the seventh-best film of 2014. Critic Kenneth Turan of the Los Angeles Times called it a "crackerjack thriller" and praised the performance of the entire cast but Hoffman in particular. He wrote that A Most Wanted Man is "a fitting film for him to leave on, not only because it is so expertly done but because his role was so challenging."
