= Outline of ancient Rome =

Overview of and topical guide to ancient Rome

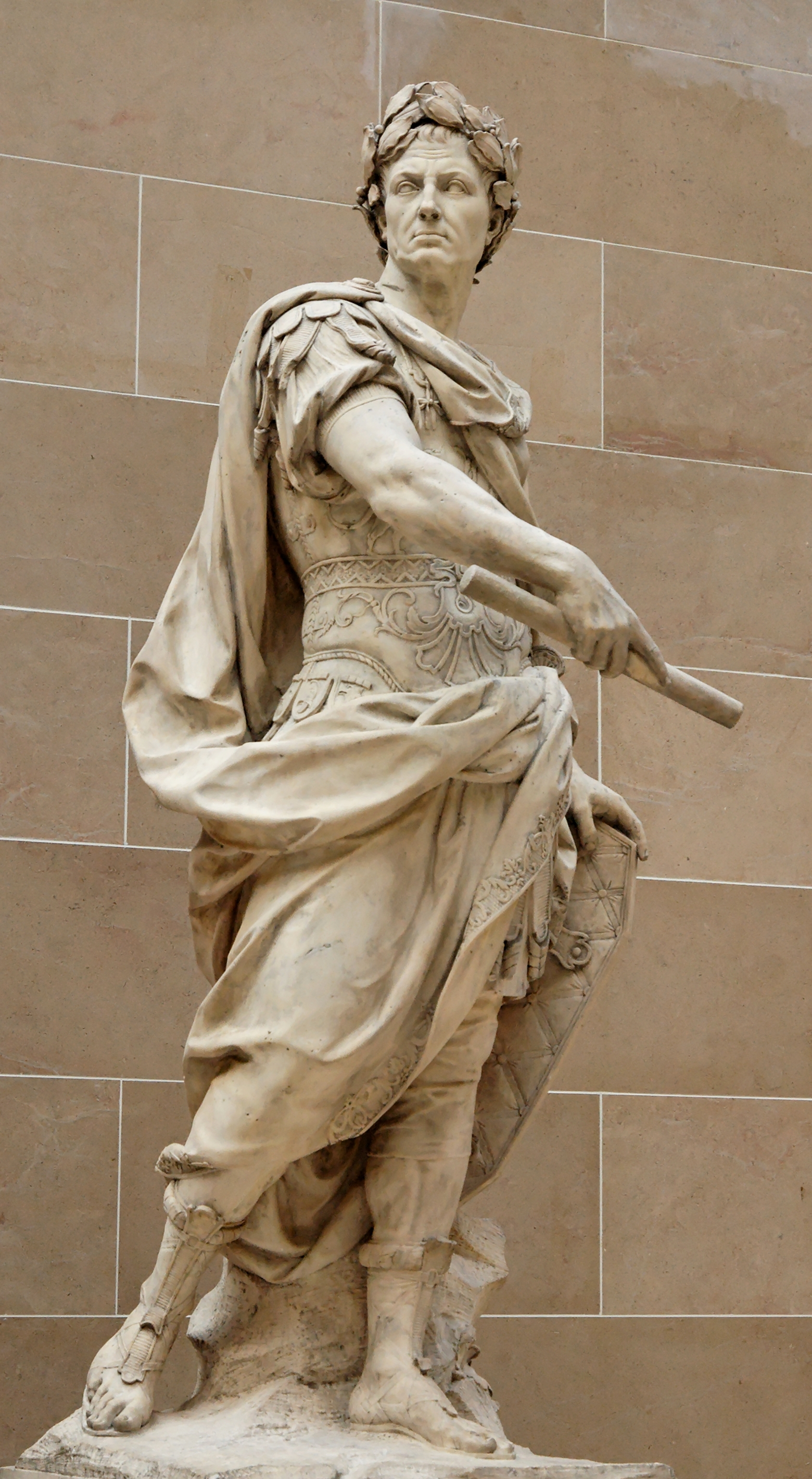
Julius Caesar

The following outline is provided as an overview of and topical guide to ancient Rome:

Ancient Rome – former civilization that thrived on the Italian Peninsula as early as the 8th century BC. Located along the Mediterranean Sea and centered on the city of Rome, it expanded to become one of the largest empires in the ancient world.

== Essence of Ancient Rome ==
- Civilization
- Classical antiquity
- Ancient Rome
- Greco-Roman world

== Geography of ancient Rome ==
The Roman Empire at its greatest extent, under Trajan (117); imperial provinces are shaded green, senatorial provinces are shaded pink, and client states are shaded gray

- Roman provinces
  - Achaia
  - Africa
  - Alpes Graiae et Poeninae
  - Arabia Petraea
  - Arcadia Aegypti
  - Asia
  - Assyria
  - Bithynia and Pontus
  - Britannia
  - Byzacena
  - Cappadocia
  - Cilicia
  - Coele Syria
  - Crete and Cyrenaica
  - Cyprus
  - Dacia
  - Dacia Aureliana
  - Dalmatia
  - Danubian provinces
  - Dardania
  - Egypt
  - Galatia
  - Gallia Aquitania
  - Gallia Belgica
  - Gallia Lugdunensis
  - Gallia Narbonensis
  - Gaul
  - Germania Antiqua
  - Germania Inferior
  - Germania Superior
  - Hispania Baetica
  - Hispania Balearica
  - Hispania Carthaginensis
  - Hispania Citerior
  - Hispania Tarraconensis
  - Illyricum
  - Islands
  - Judea
  - Lycia et Pamphylia
  - Lusitania
  - Macedonia
  - Mauretania Caesariensis
  - Mauretania Tingitana
  - Mesopotamia
  - Moesia
  - Numidia
  - Pannonia Inferior
  - Pannonia Prima
  - Pannonia Savia
  - Pannonia Secunda
  - Pannonia Superior
  - Pannonia Valeria
  - Raetia
  - Sardinia and Corsica
  - Sicilia
  - Syria
  - Tres Alpes
    - Alpes Cottiae
    - Alpes Graiae et Poeninae
    - Alpes Maritimae
- Cities founded by the Romans
- Climate of ancient Rome
- Demography of the Roman Empire
- Roman geographers
- Topography of ancient Rome
  - Lexicon Topographicum Urbis Romae (1993–2000)

== Government and politics of ancient Rome ==
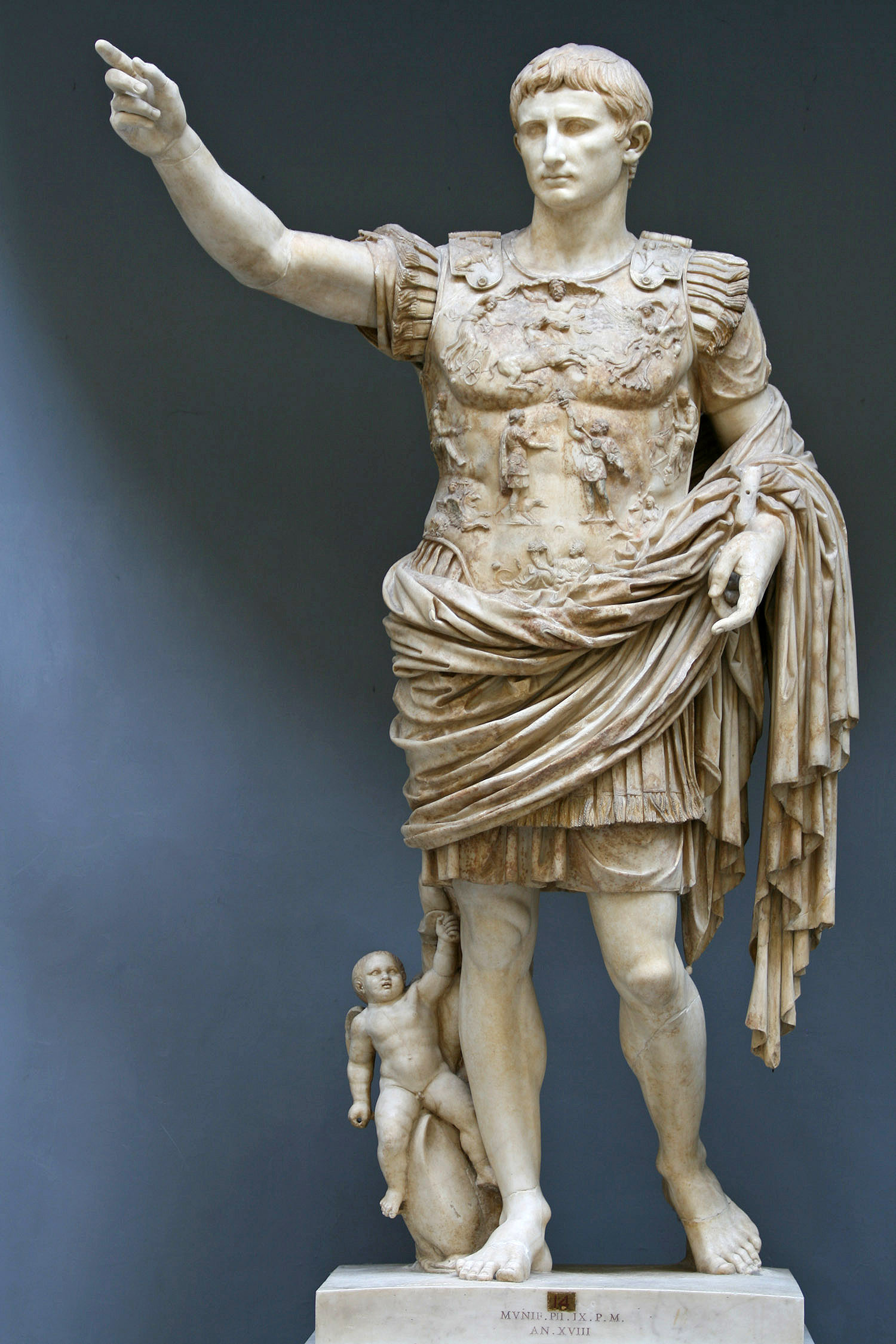
Augustus, the first Roman emperor

- Curia
- Forum
- Cursus honorum
- Collegiality
- Emperor
- Legatus
- Dux
- Officium
- Praefectus
- Princeps senatus
- Populares
- Vicarius
- Vigintisexviri
- Lictor
- Magister militum
- Imperator
- Pontifex maximus
- Augustus
- Caesar
- SPQR
- Tetrarch
- Triumvirate
- Dictator
- Decemviri

=== Political institutions of ancient Rome ===
Political institutions of ancient Rome

- of ancient Rome in general
  - Roman Senate
  - Roman assemblies
    - Curiate Assembly
    - Centuriate Assembly
    - Tribal Assembly
    - Plebeian Council
  - Executive magistrates
- of the Roman Kingdom
  - Senate of the Roman Kingdom
  - Legislative Assemblies of the Roman Kingdom
  - Executive magistrates of the Roman Kingdom
- of the Roman Republic
  - Senate of the Roman Republic
  - Legislative Assemblies of the Roman Republic
  - Executive magistrates of the Roman Republic
- of the Roman Empire
  - Senate of the Roman Empire
  - Legislative Assemblies of the Roman Empire
  - Executive magistrates of the Roman Empire

==== Magistrates ====
Roman magistrate

===== Ordinary magistrates =====
Ordinary magistrate

- Tribune
- Quaestor
- Aedile
- Praetor
- Consul
- Censor
- Promagistrate
- Governor

===== Extraordinary magistrates =====
Extraordinary magistrate

- Dictator
- Master of the Horse
- Decemviri
- Consular tribune
- Triumvir
- Rex
- Interrex

=== Roman law ===
Roman law

- Constitution (Roman law)
- Roman laws
- Twelve Tables
- Roman citizenship
- Auctoritas
- Imperium
- Status in Roman legal system
- Roman litigation
- Roman Constitution
  - History of the Roman Constitution
  - Constitution of the Roman Kingdom
    - History of the Constitution of the Roman Kingdom
  - Constitution of the Roman Republic
    - History of the Constitution of the Roman Republic
    - Constitutional reforms of Sulla
    - Constitutional reforms of Julius Caesar
  - Constitution of the Roman Empire
    - History of the Constitution of the Roman Empire
  - Constitution of the Late Roman Empire
    - History of the Constitution of the Late Roman Empire (post Diocletian)

=== Military of ancient Rome ===
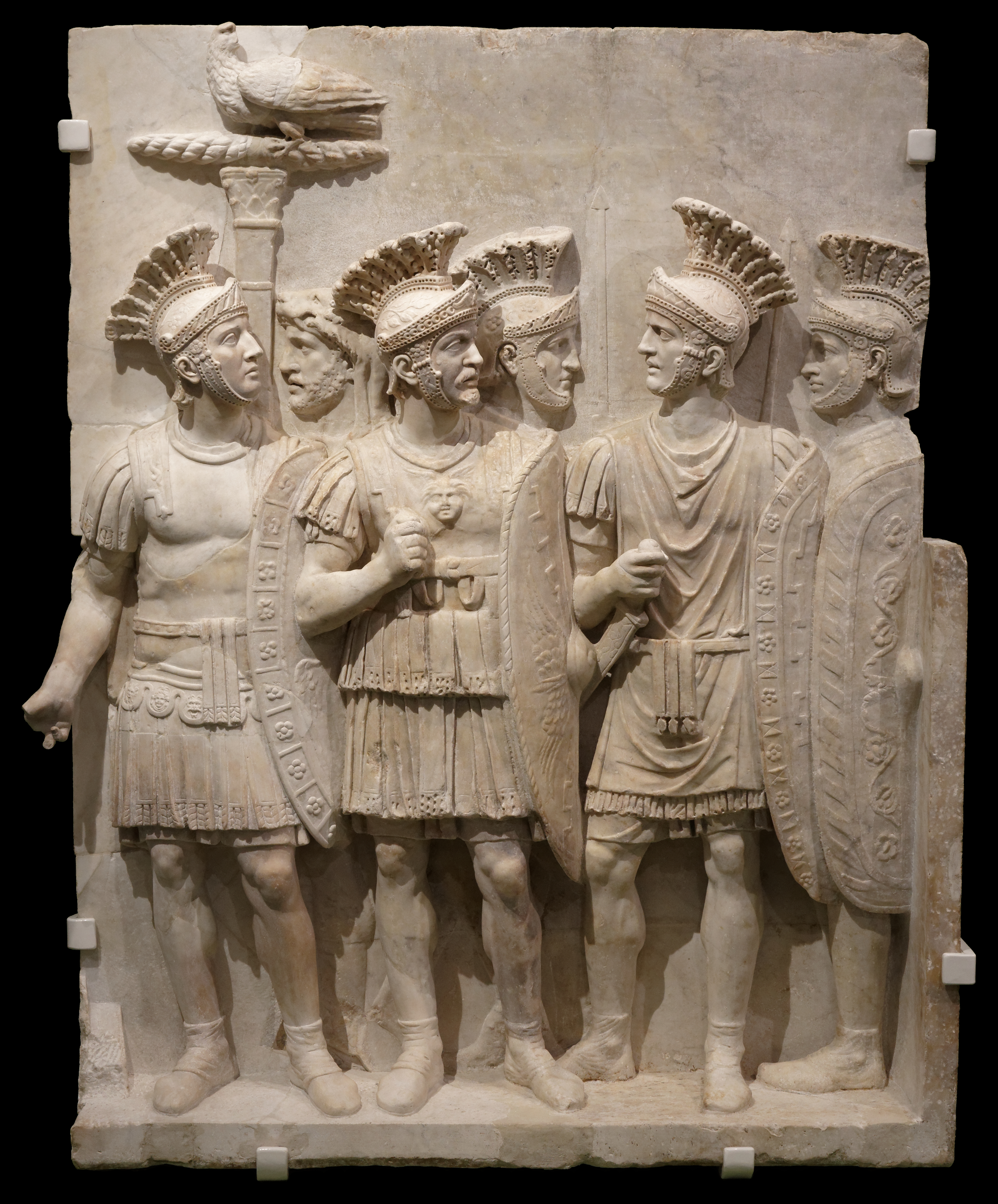
The Praetorians Relief, from the Arch of Claudius, Rome

Military of ancient Rome

- Roman generals
- Weapons
  - Ballista
  - Battering ram
  - Catapulta
  - Gladius
  - Onager
  - Pilum
  - Scorpio
  - Siege tower
  - Spatha
- Roman military diploma
  - Honesta missio
- Praetorian Guard
- Victory titles

==== Roman armed forces ====
- Roman army
  - Early Roman army
  - Roman army of the mid-Republic
  - Roman army of the late Republic
  - Imperial Roman army
  - Late Roman army
  - East Roman army
- Size of the Roman army
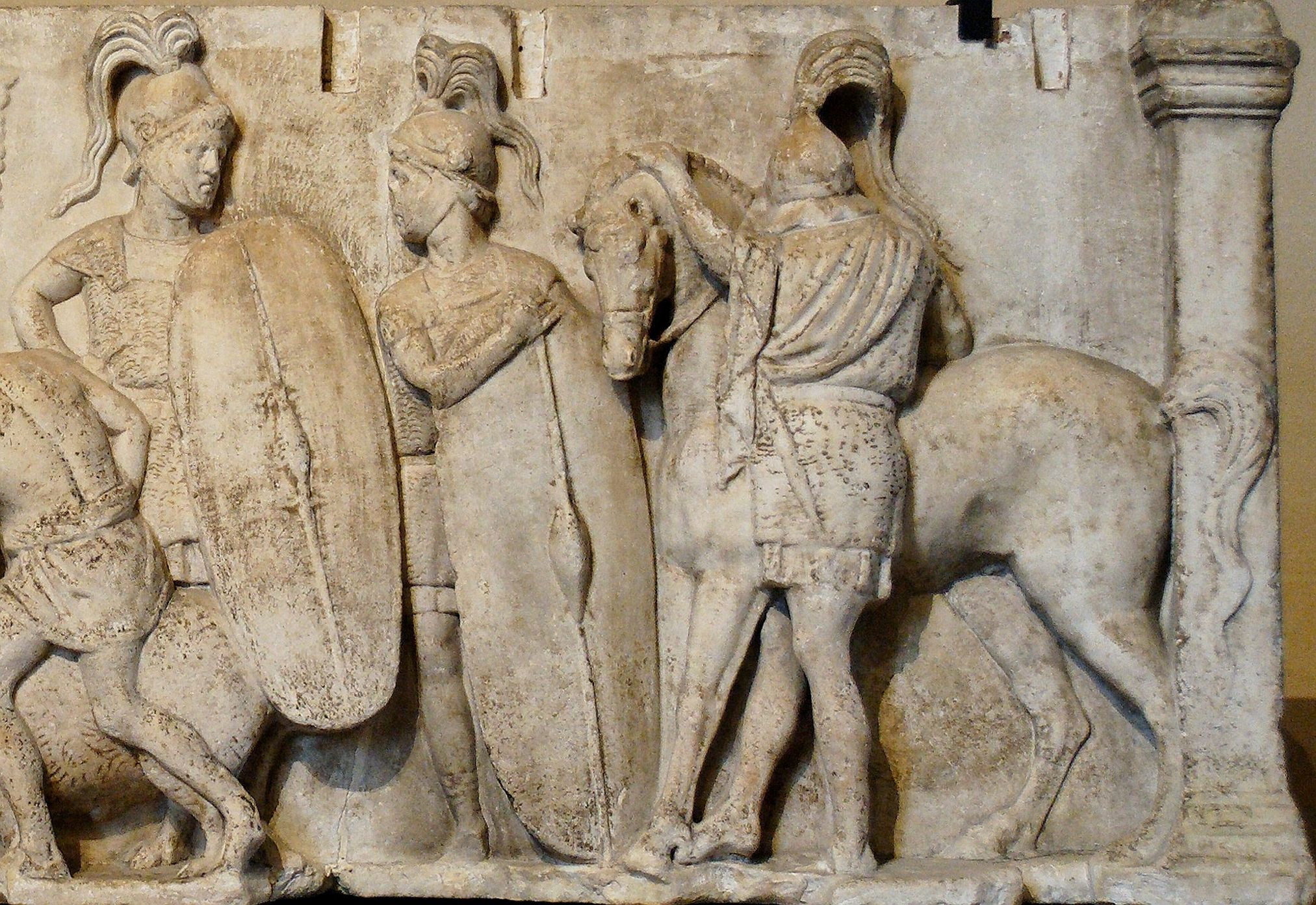
  - Altar of Domitius Ahenobarbus, c. 122 BC; the altar shows two Roman infantrymen equipped with long scuta and a cavalryman with his horse. All are shown wearing chain mail armour.
    Troops
    - Alae
    - Cohorts
    - Auxiliaries
      - Alpine regiments of the Roman army
    - Cavalry
      - Turmae
    - Centuriae
    - Contubernia
    - Legions
      - Vexillationes
    - Limitanei
      - Numeri
    - Maniples
    - Palatini
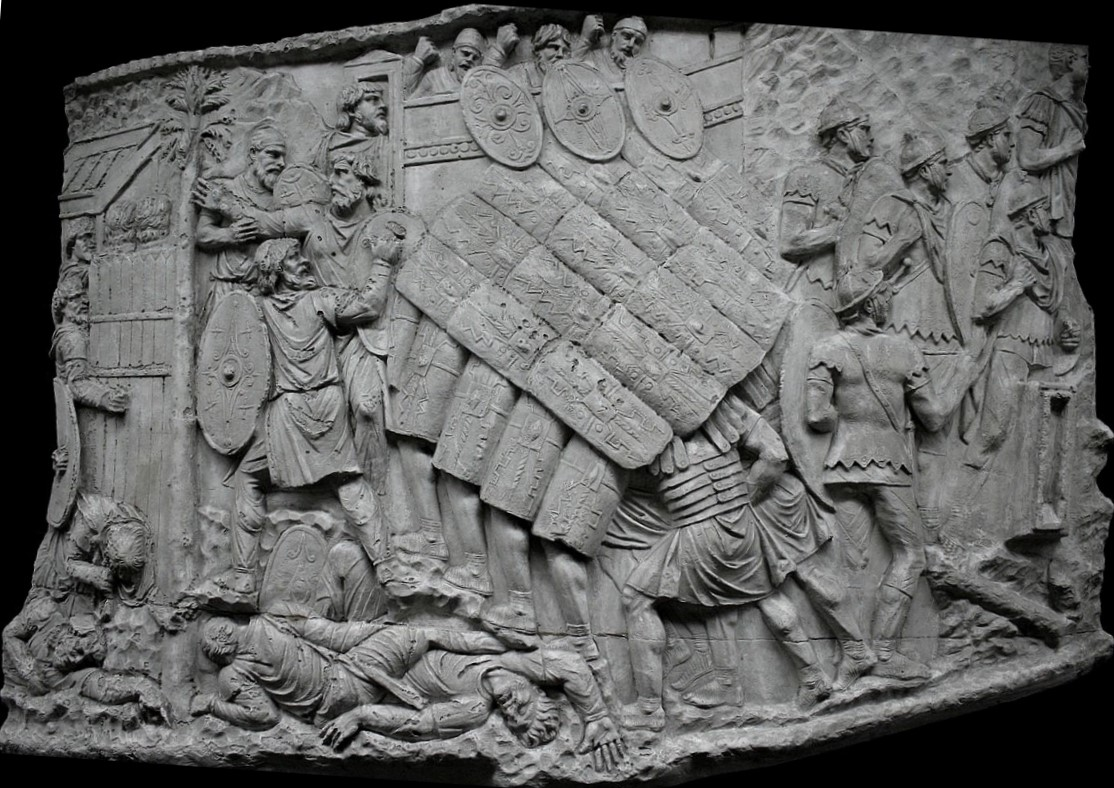
  - Roman soldiers in testudo formation
    Roman infantry tactics
  - Testudo formation
- Military equipment
  - Roman military personal equipment
  - Roman siege engines
- Navy
  - Fleet
- Decorations and punishments
  - Roman triumph
    - Ovation
  - Decimatio
  - Fustuarium
- Economics of the Roman army
- Roman military clothing

==== Military history of Rome ====
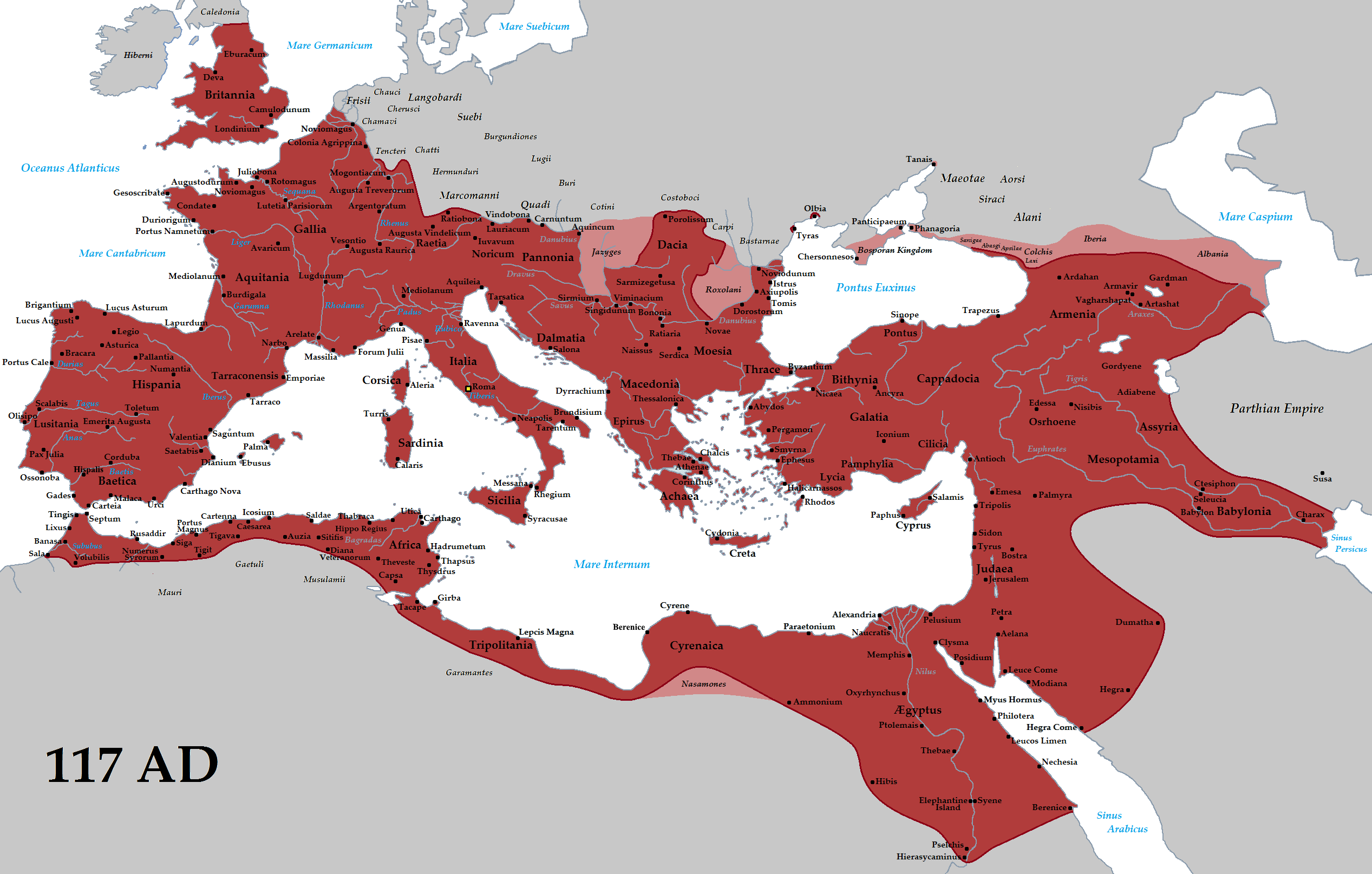
Roman Empire at its greatest extent, in AD 117 vassals

Military history of ancient Rome

- Borders of the Roman Empire
- Roman military frontiers and fortifications
  - Castra
- Military engineering of ancient Rome
- Military establishment of the Roman kingdom
- Military establishment of the Roman Republic
- Political history of the Roman military
- Strategy of the Roman military
- Structural history of the Roman military
- Technological history of the Roman military

==== Military conflict ====
- Campaign history of the Roman military
- Roman wars
- Roman battles
  - Battle of Cannae
  - Battle of Cape Ecnomus
  - Battle of Actium

== General history of ancient Rome ==
Roman era

- History of Rome
  - Founding of Rome
- Kingdom of Rome
  - Kings of Rome

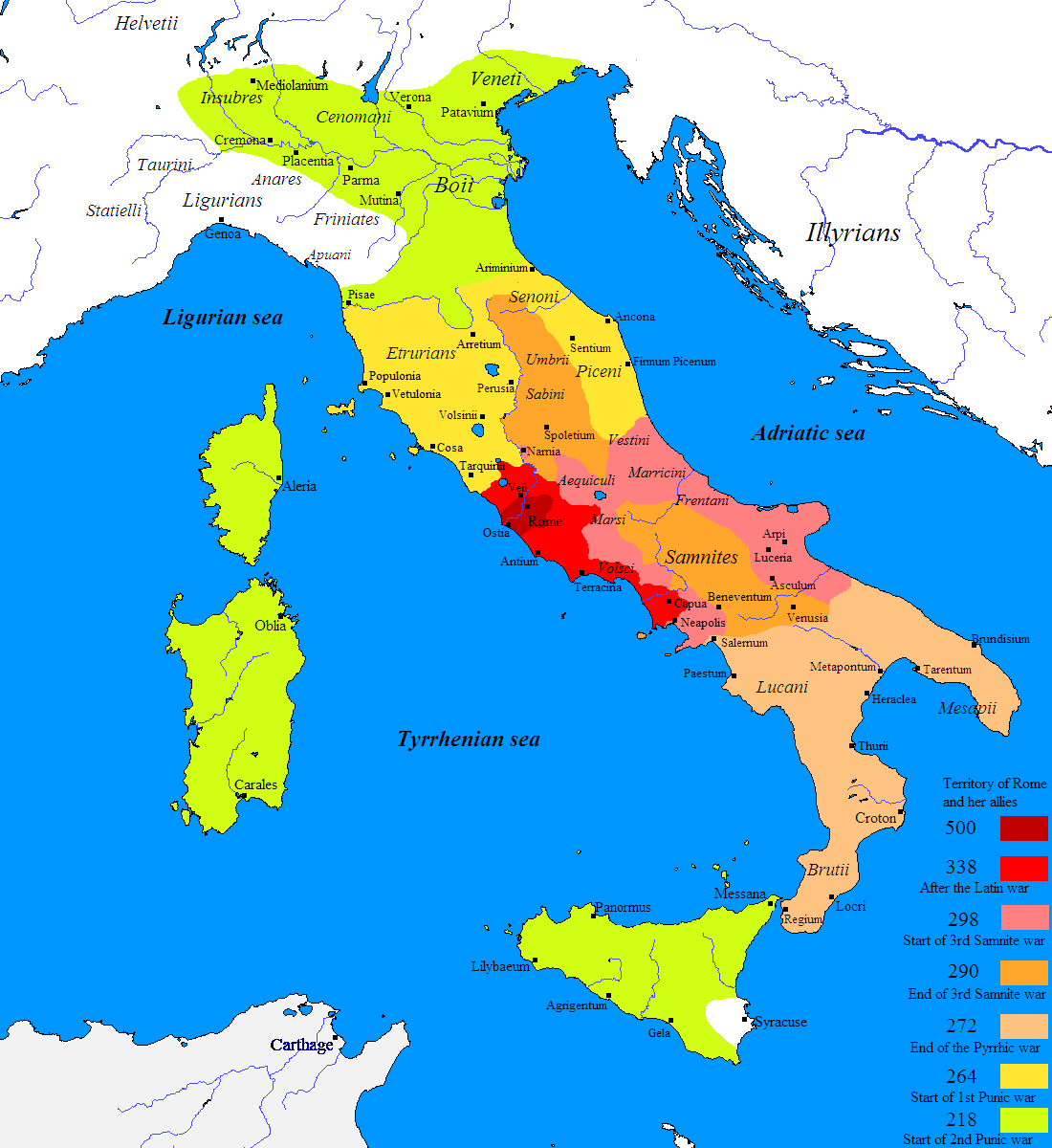
Roman expansion in Italy from 500 BC to 218 BC through the Latin War (light red), Samnite Wars (pink/orange), Pyrrhic War (beige), and First and Second Punic War (yellow and green). Cisalpine Gaul (238-146 BC) and Alpine valleys (16-7 BC) were later added. The Roman Republic in 500 BC is marked with dark red.

Roman Republic

  - Conflict of the Orders (494-287 BC)
  - Punic Wars (264-146 BC) – series of three wars fought between Rome and ancient Carthage
    - First Punic War (264-241 BC)
      - Ebro Treaty
    - Second Punic War (218-201 BC) – marked by Hannibal's surprising overland journey and his costly crossing of the Alps, followed by his reinforcement by Gaulish allies and crushing victories over Roman armies in the battle of the Trebia and the giant ambush at Trasimene.
      - Hannibal – Punic Carthaginian military commander, generally considered one of the greatest military commanders in history. Hannibal occupied much of Italy for 15 years, but a Roman counter-invasion of North Africa forced him to return to Carthage, where he was decisively defeated by Scipio Africanus at the Battle of Zama.
        - Conquests of Hannibal
          - Hannibal's Crossing of the Alps
          - Battle of the Trebia
          - Battle of Lake Trasimene
          - Battle of Cannae
        - Battle of Zama – marked the final and decisive end of the Second Punic War. A Roman army led by Publius Cornelius Scipio Africanus defeated a Carthaginian force led by the legendary commander Hannibal. Soon after this defeat on their home ground, the Carthaginian senate sued for peace, which was given to them by the Roman Republic on rather humiliating terms, ending the 17-year war.
    - Third Punic War (149-146 BC) – involved an extended siege of Carthage, ending in the city's thorough destruction. The resurgence of the struggle can be explained by growing anti-Roman agitations in Hispania and Greece, and the visible improvement of Carthaginian wealth and martial power in the fifty years since the Second Punic War.
      - Siege of Carthage (c. 149 BC)
  - Crisis of the Roman Republic (134 BC-44 BC) – extended period of political instability and social unrest that culminated in the demise of the Roman Republic and the advent of the Roman Empire.
    - Extent of the Roman Republic on the eve of the assassination of Julius Caesar, 44 BC
      Assassination of Julius Caesar
- Roman Empire
  - Principate (27 BC-284 AD) – first period of the Roman Empire, extending from the beginning of the reign of Caesar Augustus to the Crisis of the Third Century, after which it was replaced with the Dominate. During the Principate, the constitution of the Roman Republic was never formally abolished. It was amended in such a way as to maintain a politically correct façade of Republican government. This ended following the Crisis of the Third Century (235–284), during the reign of Diocletian.
    - Julio-Claudian dynasty (27 BC-68 AD) – the first five Roman Emperors, including Augustus, Tiberius, Caligula (also known as Gaius), Claudius, and Nero. The dynasty ended when Nero committed suicide.
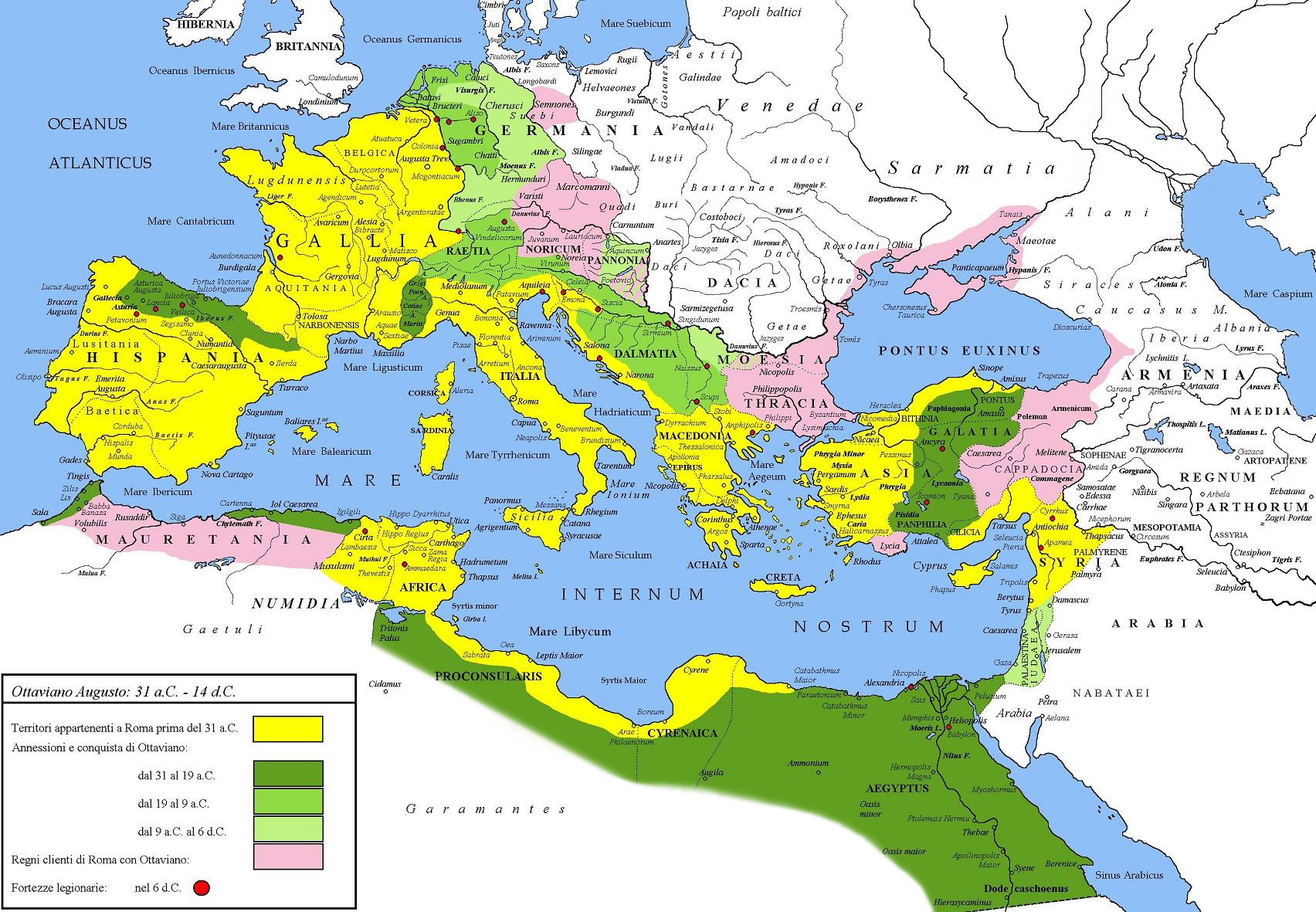
      - Extent of the Roman Empire under Augustus. Yellow shows the extent of the Republic in 31 BC, shades of green represent territories gradually conquered by Augustus, and pink shows client states.
        Augustus
      - Tiberius (ruled 14-37 AD) – stepson of Augustus. He was one of Rome's greatest generals, conquering Pannonia, Dalmatia, Raetia, and temporarily Germania; laying the foundations for the northern frontier. But he came to be remembered as a dark, reclusive, and sombre ruler who never really desired to be emperor; Pliny the Elder called him tristissimus hominum, "the gloomiest of men."
      - Caligula
      - Claudius
      - Nero
    - Year of the Four Emperors (69 AD) – these four emperors were Galba, Otho, Vitellius, and Vespasian. Vespasian's rule marked the beginning of the Flavian dynasty.
      - Galba
      - Otho
      - Vitellius
      - Vespasian
    - Flavian dynasty (69-96 AD)
    - Nerva–Antonine dynasty (96-192 AD) – dynasty of seven Roman Emperors who ruled over the Roman Empire from 96 AD to 192 AD. These Emperors were Nerva, Trajan, Hadrian, Antoninus Pius, Marcus Aurelius, Lucius Verus, and Commodus.
      - Nerva
      - Trajan
      - Hadrian
      - Antoninus Pius
      - Marcus Aurelius
      - Lucius Verus
      - Commodus
    - Severan dynasty (193-235 AD)
      - During the Crisis of the Third Century, the Roman Empire suffered internal schisms, forming the Palmyrene Empire and the Gallic Empire
        Crisis of the Third Century (235-284 AD) – period in which the Roman Empire nearly collapsed under the combined pressures of invasion, civil war, plague, and economic depression. The Crisis began with the assassination of Emperor Alexander Severus at the hands of his own troops, initiating a fifty-year period in which 20–25 claimants to the title of Emperor, mostly prominent Roman army generals, assumed imperial power over all or part of the Empire.
        - Barracks emperor – any Roman Emperor who seized power by virtue of his command of the army. Barracks emperors were especially common in the period from 235 through 284, during the Crisis of the Third Century.
          - List of barracks emperors
        - Gallic Empire (260-274 AD) – modern name for a breakaway realm of the Roman Empire, founded by Postumus in 260 in the wake of barbarian invasions and instability in Rome, and at its height included the territories of Germania, Gaul, Britannia, and (briefly) Hispania.
        - Palmyrene Empire (260-273) – splinter empire, that broke away from the Roman Empire during the Crisis of the Third Century. It encompassed the Roman provinces of Syria Palaestina, Egypt and large parts of Asia Minor.
  - Dominate (284-476 AD) – 'despotic' latter phase of government in the ancient Roman Empire from the conclusion of the Third Century Crisis until the collapse of the Western Empire. The Emperor Diocletian abandoned the appearances of the Republic for the sake of control, and introduced a novel system of joint rule by four monarchs known as the Tetrarchy.
    - Decline of the Roman Empire – process spanning many centuries; there is no consensus when it might have begun but many dates and time lines have been proposed by historians.
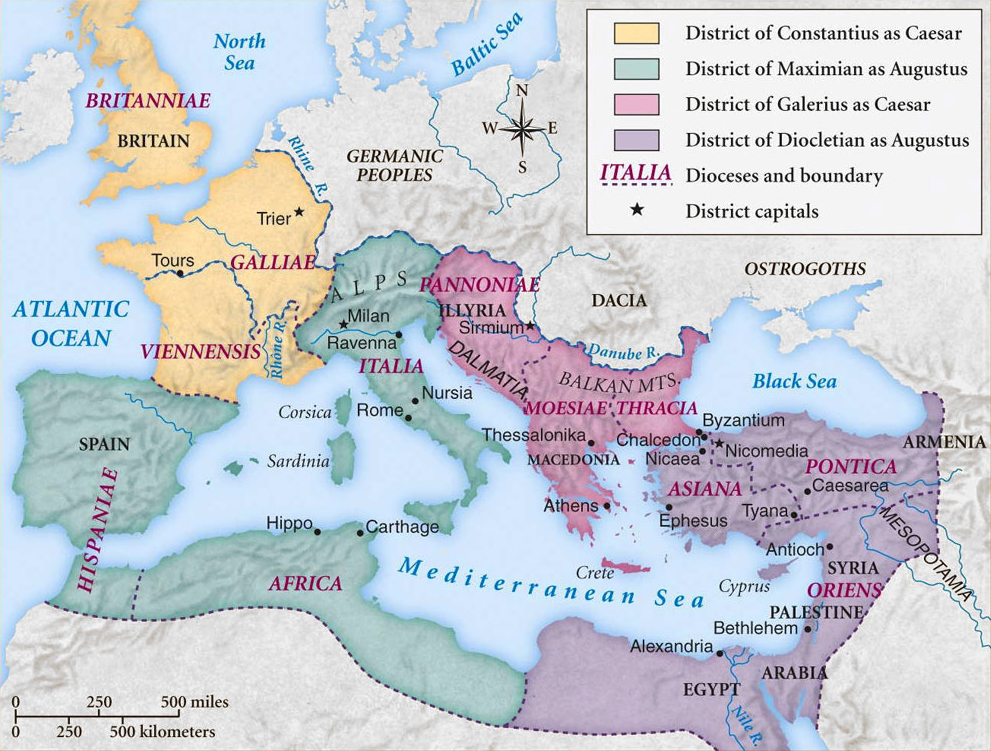
      - Map of the Roman Empire under the Tetrarchy, showing the dioceses and the four Tetrarchs' zones of influence.
        Tetrarchy (293-313 AD) – Diocletian designated the general Maximian as co-emperor, first as Caesar (junior emperor) in 285, and then promoted him to Augustus in 286. Diocletian took care of matters in the Eastern regions of the Empire while Maximian similarly took charge of the Western regions. In 293, feeling more focus was needed on both civic and military problems, Diocletian, with Maximian's consent, expanded the imperial college by appointing two Caesars (one responsible to each Augustus). The tetrarchy collapsed, however, in 313 and a few years later Constantine I reunited the two administrative divisions of the Empire as sole Augustus.
        - First Tetrarchy – created by Diocletian with Maximian's consent in 293 by the appointment of two subordinate Caesars.
          - Diocletian (Augustus)
            - Galerius (Caesar)
          - Maximian (Augustus)
            - Constantius Chlorus (Caesar)
        - Second Tetrarchy – in 305, the senior emperors jointly abdicated and retired, elevating Constantius and Galerius to the rank of Augusti. They in turn appointed two new Caesars.
          - Galerius (Augustus)
            - Maximinus (Caesar)
          - Constantius Chlorus (Augustus)
            - Flavius Valerius Severus (Caesar)
        - Civil wars of the Tetrarchy – series of conflicts between the co-emperors of the Roman Empire, starting in 306 AD with the usurpation of Maxentius and the defeat of Severus, and ending with the defeat of Licinius at the hands of Constantine I in 324 AD.
      - Constantinian dynasty – informal name for the ruling family of the Roman Empire from Constantius Chlorus (†305) to the death of Julian in 363. It is named after its most famous member, Constantine the Great who became the sole ruler of the empire in 324. It is also called the Neo-Flavian dynasty.
      - First phase of the Migration Period
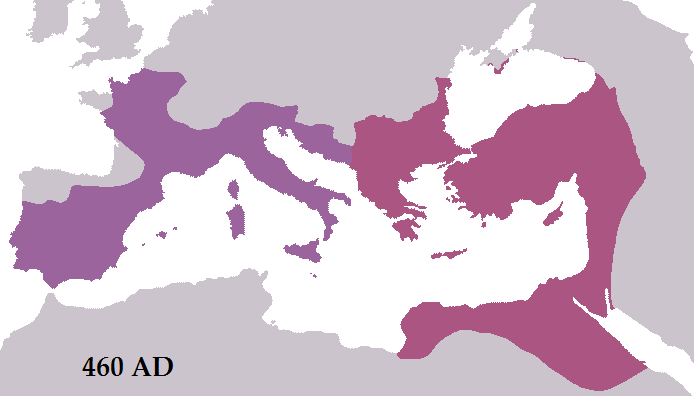
      - The Roman Empire during the reigns of Leo I (east) and Majorian (west) in 460 AD.
        Division of the Roman Empire – in order to maintain control and improve administration, various schemes to divide the work of the Roman Emperor by sharing it between individuals were tried between 285 and 324, from 337 to 350, from 364 to 392, and again between 395 and 480. Although the administrative subdivisions varied, they generally involved a division of labour between East and West. Each division was a form of power-sharing (or even job-sharing), for the ultimate imperium was not divisible and therefore the empire remained legally one state—although the co-emperors often saw each other as rivals or enemies rather than partners.
        - Western Roman Empire – In 285, Emperor Diocletian (r. 284–305) divided the Roman Empire's administration into western and eastern halves. In 293, Rome lost its capital status, and Milan became the capital. Eventually, the capital shifted once again to Ravenna.
        - Byzantine Empire (Eastern Roman Empire) – term used by modern historians to distinguish the Constantinople-centered Roman Empire of the Middle Ages from its earlier classical existence.
          - Nicomedia – Nicomedia was the metropolis of Bithynia under the Roman Empire, and Diocletian made it the eastern capital city of the Roman Empire in 286 when he introduced the Tetrarchy system.
          - Constantinople – founded in AD 330, at ancient Byzantium as the new capital of the entire Roman Empire by Constantine the Great, after whom it was named.
            - Walls of Constantinople
  - The Western and Eastern Roman Empires by 476
    Fall of the Western Roman Empire (476 AD) – the two halves of the Roman Empire ended at different times, with the Western Roman Empire coming to an end in 476 AD (the end of Ancient Rome). The Eastern Roman Empire (referred to by historians as the Byzantine Empire) survived for nearly a thousand years more, and eventually engulfed much of the Western Roman Empire's former territory.
    - Fall of the Western Roman Empire – this was not sudden, and took over a hundred years. By 476, when Odoacer deposed the Emperor Romulus, the Western Roman Empire wielded negligible military, political, or financial power and had no effective control over the scattered Western domains that still described themselves as Roman.
      - Odoacer – Germanic soldier, who in 476 became the first King of Italy (476-493). His reign is commonly seen as marking the end of the Western Roman Empire.
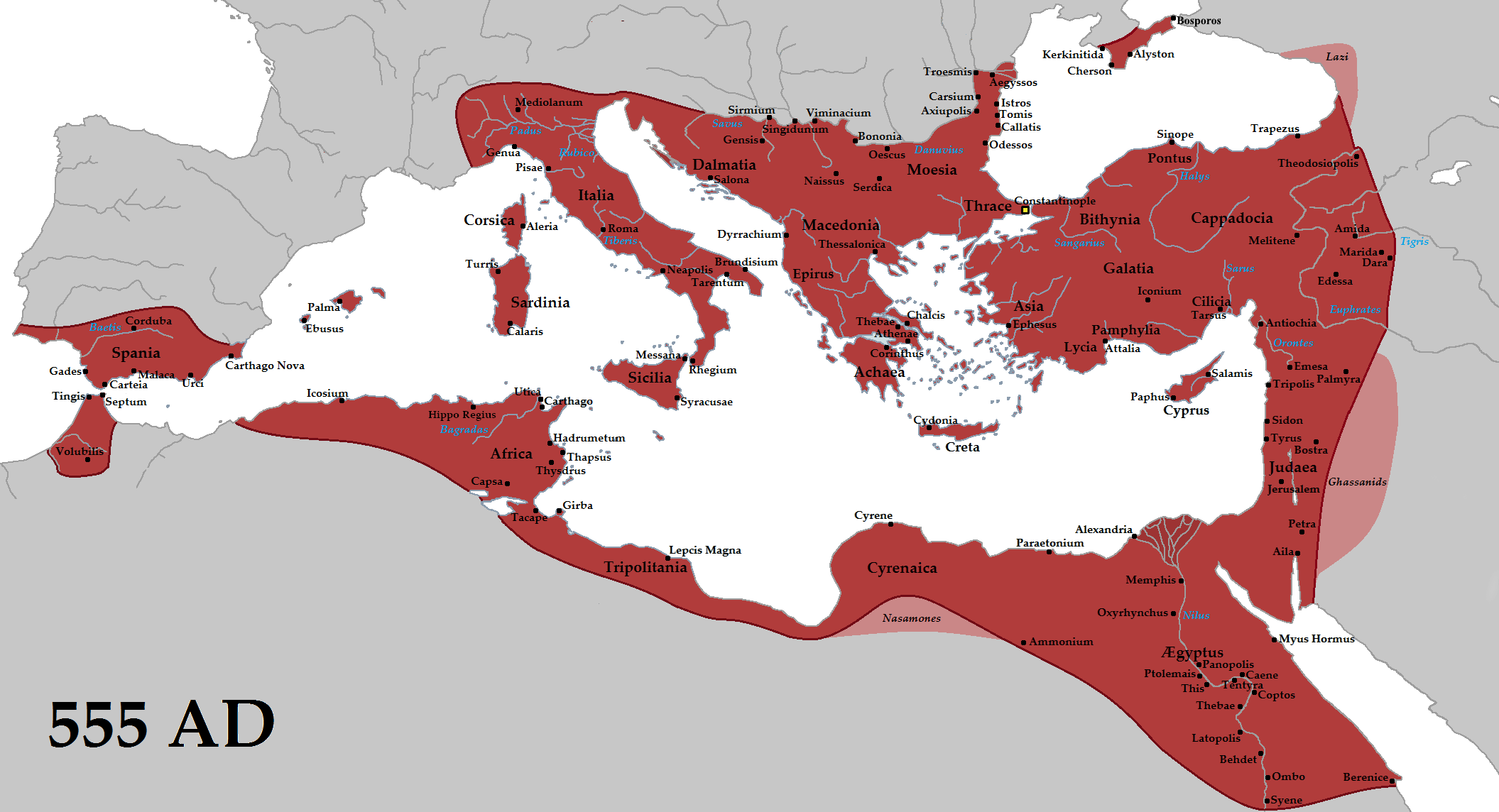
    - For comparison, the Byzantine Empire at its greatest extent under Justinian I, in 555 AD
      Byzantine Empire (Byzantium) – after the Western Roman Empire fragmented and collapsed, the Eastern Roman Empire (Byzantium) continued to thrive, existing for nearly another thousand years until it fell to the Ottoman Turks in 1453. Its citizens referred to it as the Roman Empire, and saw it as a direct continuation of it. Historians consider it to be a distinctly different empire, with some overlap, but generally not included in the period referred to as Ancient Rome. Byzantium differed in major ways, including its primary language, which was Greek rather than Latin. It also differed religiously, with Roman mythology being replaced by Christianity.
- Legacy of the Roman Empire – what the Roman Empire passed on, in the form of cultural values, religious beliefs, as well as technological and other achievements, and through which it continued to shape other civilizations, a process which continues to this day.
  - Cultural heritage of the Roman Empire
    - Last of the Romans
  - History of the Romans in Arabia
  - Legacy of Byzantium
  - Third Rome

=== Roman historiography ===
Roman historiography

- Historiography of the fall of the Western Roman Empire
- Prosopography of ancient Rome

=== Works on Roman history ===
- Ab urbe condita by Titus Livius (around 59 BC-17 AD), a monumental history of Rome, from its founding (traditionally dated to 753 BC).
- Annals and Histories by Tacitus
- De re militari by Vegetius
- Res Gestae by Ammianus Marcellinus
- The History of the Decline and Fall of the Roman Empire by Edward Gibbon

== Culture of ancient Rome ==
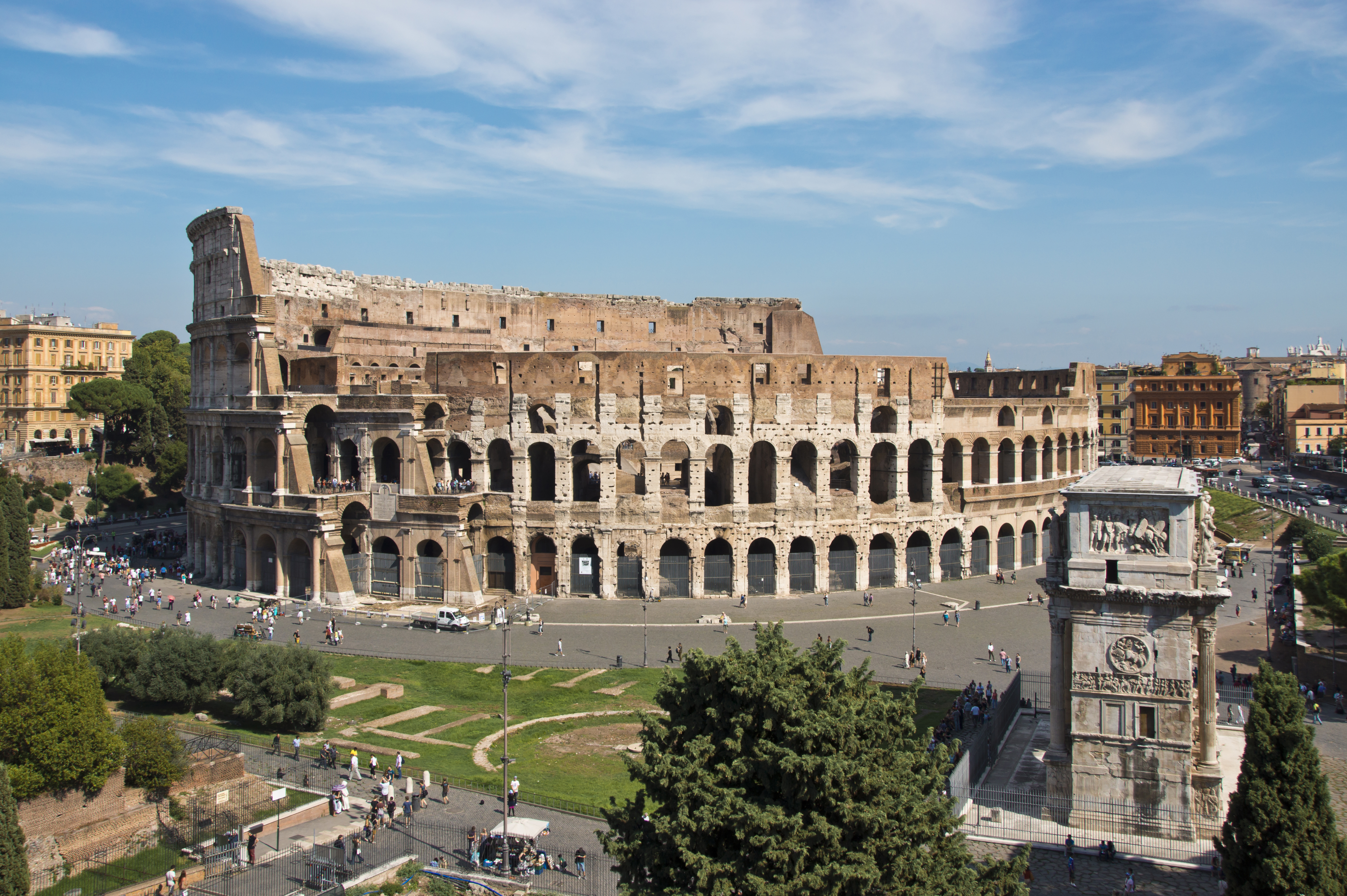
The Colosseum, the largest amphitheatre ever built

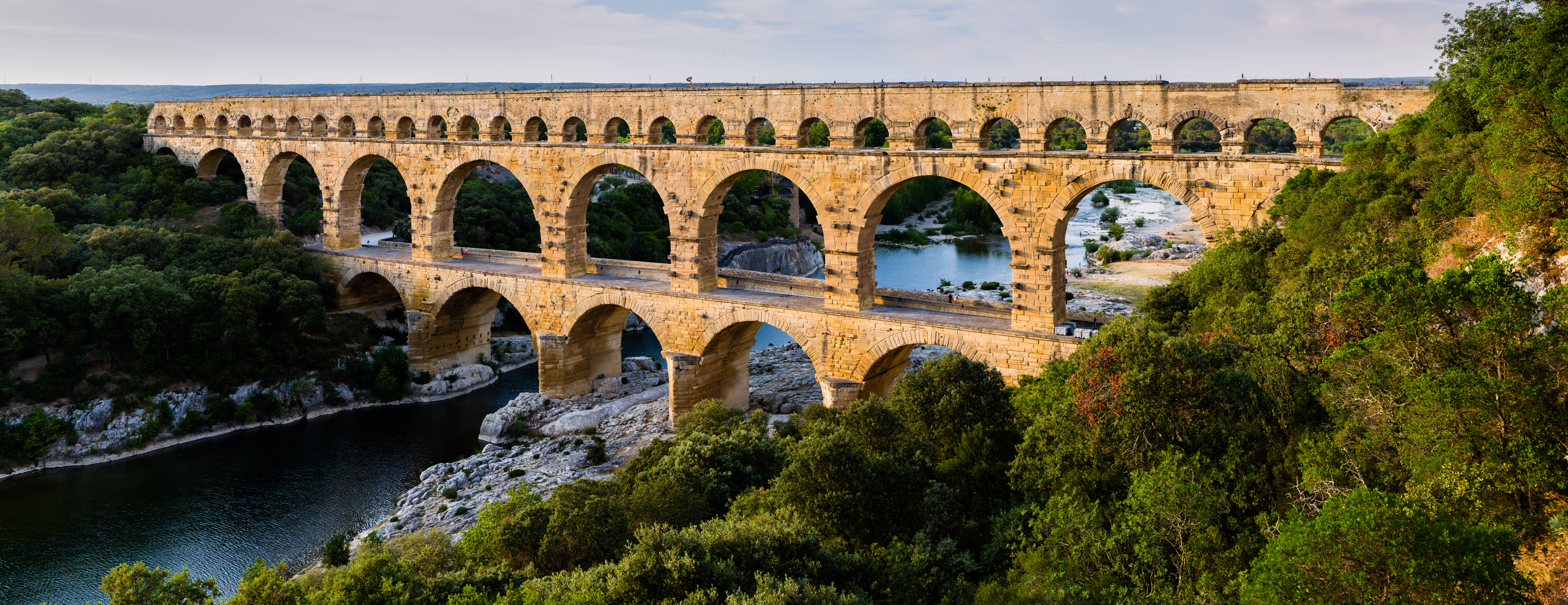
Pont du Gard, a Roman aqueduct built circa 40–60 AD

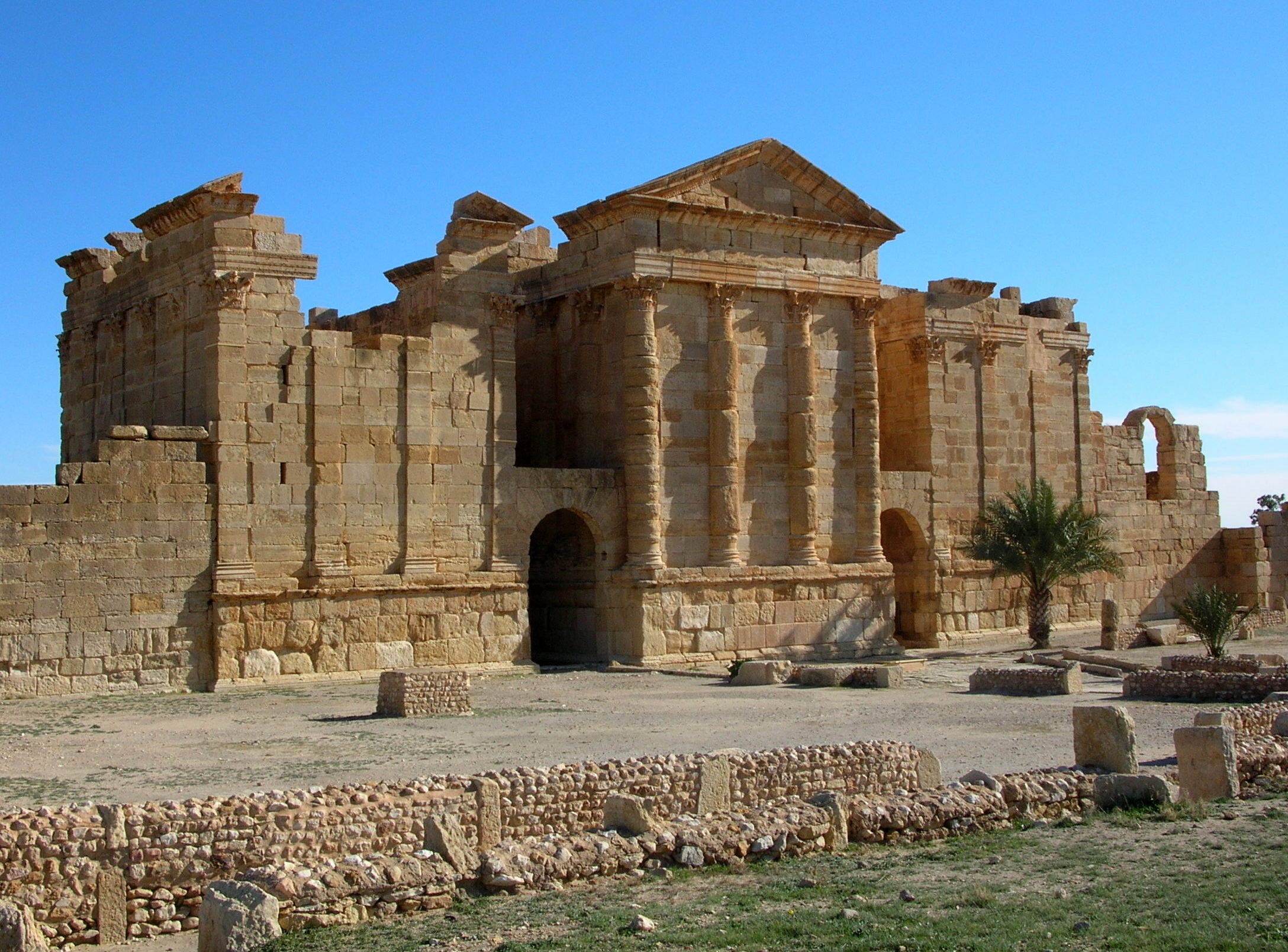
Back side of the Roman temples of Sbeitla, Tunisia

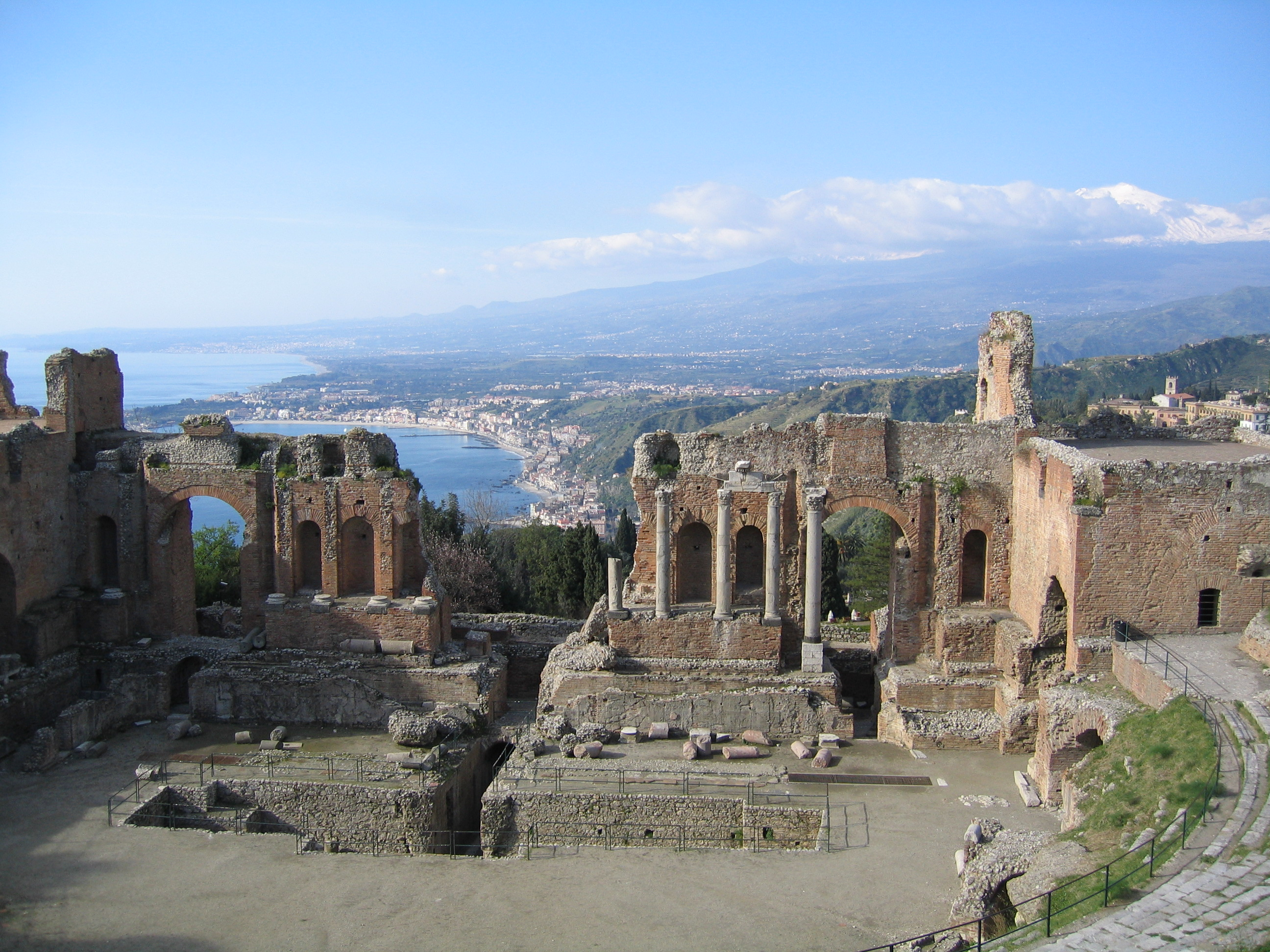
The ancient theatre of Taormina

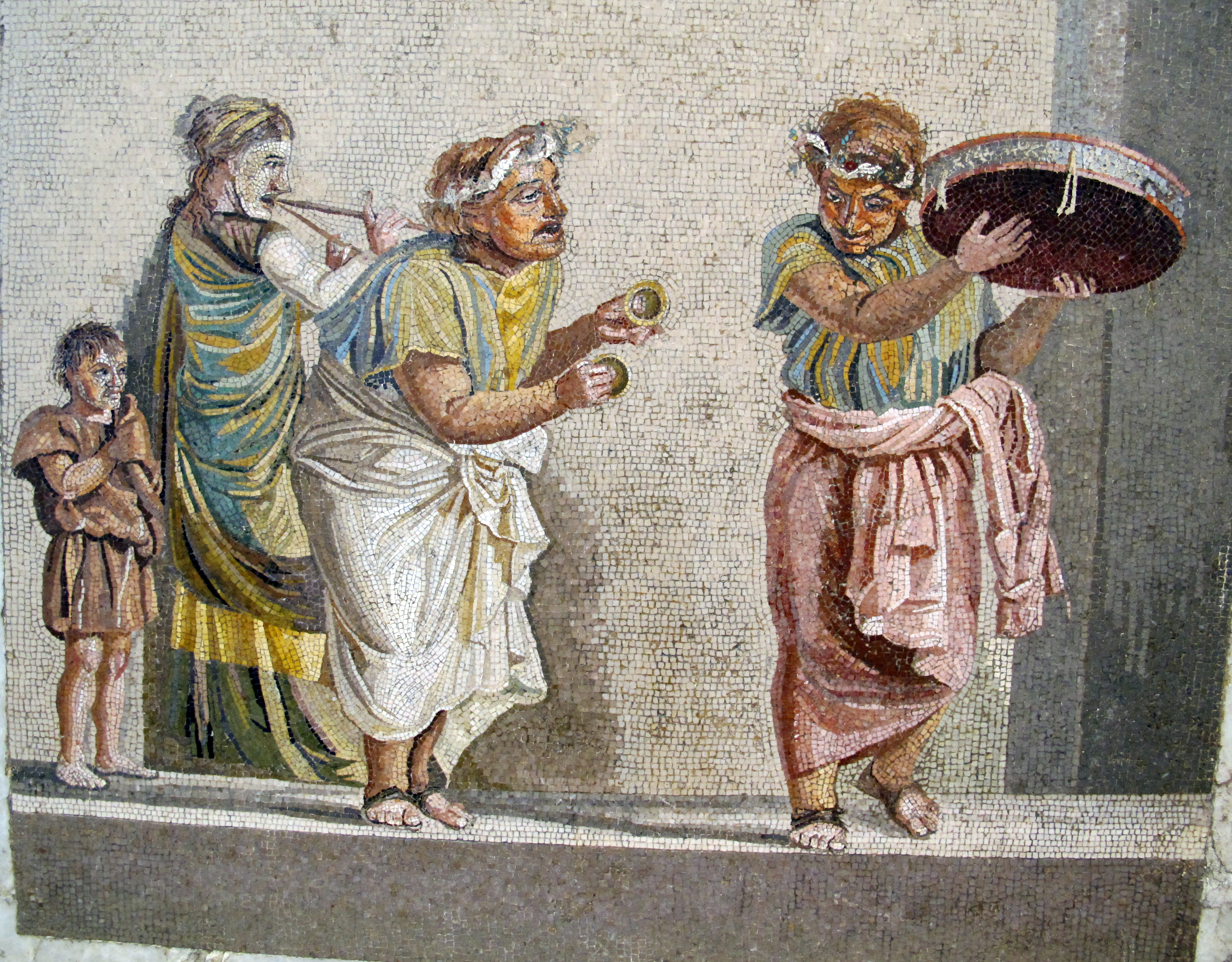
Trio of musicians playing an aulos, cymbala, and tympanum (mosaic from Pompeii)

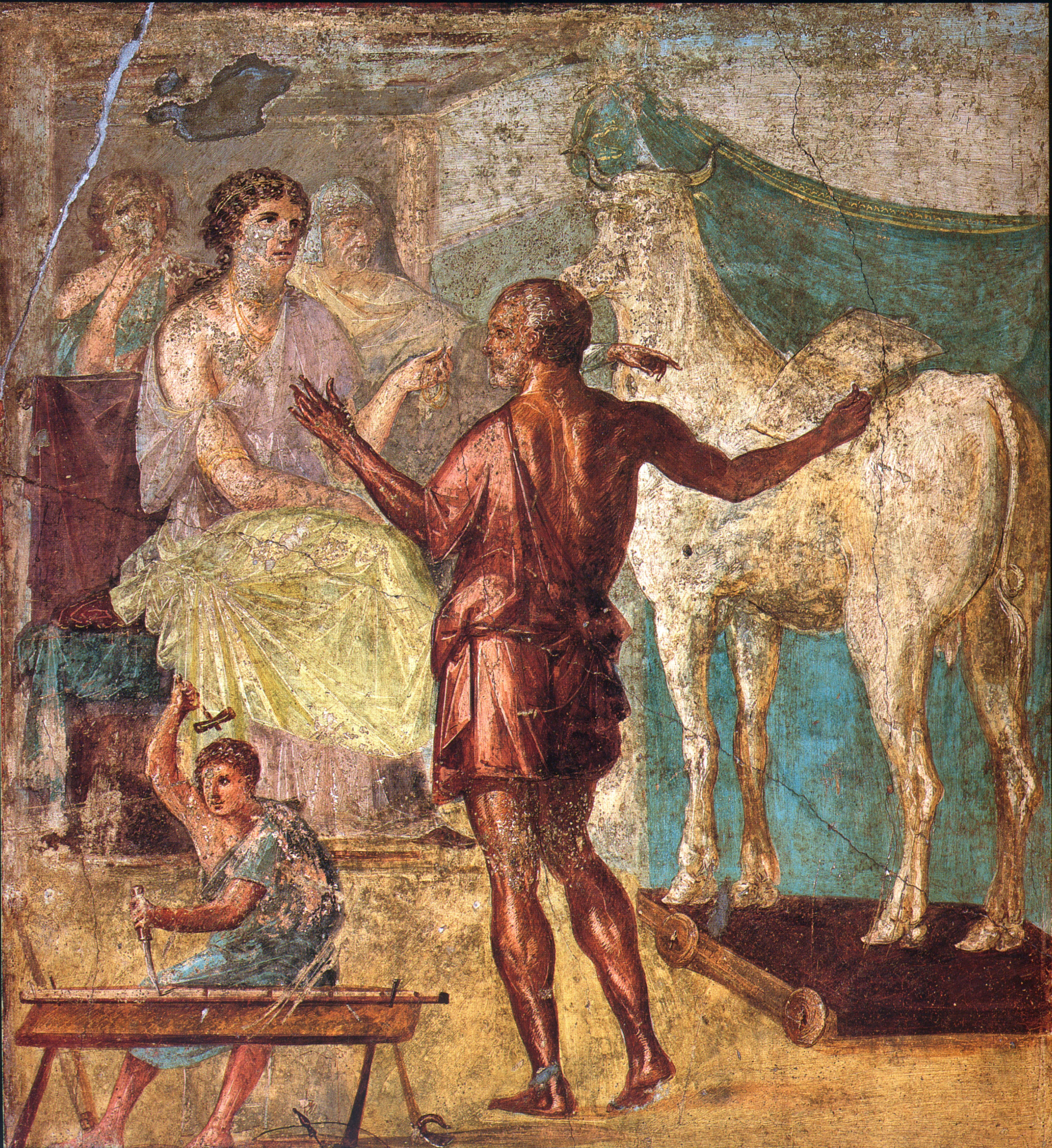
Daedalus and Pasiphaë, Roman fresco in the House of the Vettii, Pompeii, first century AD

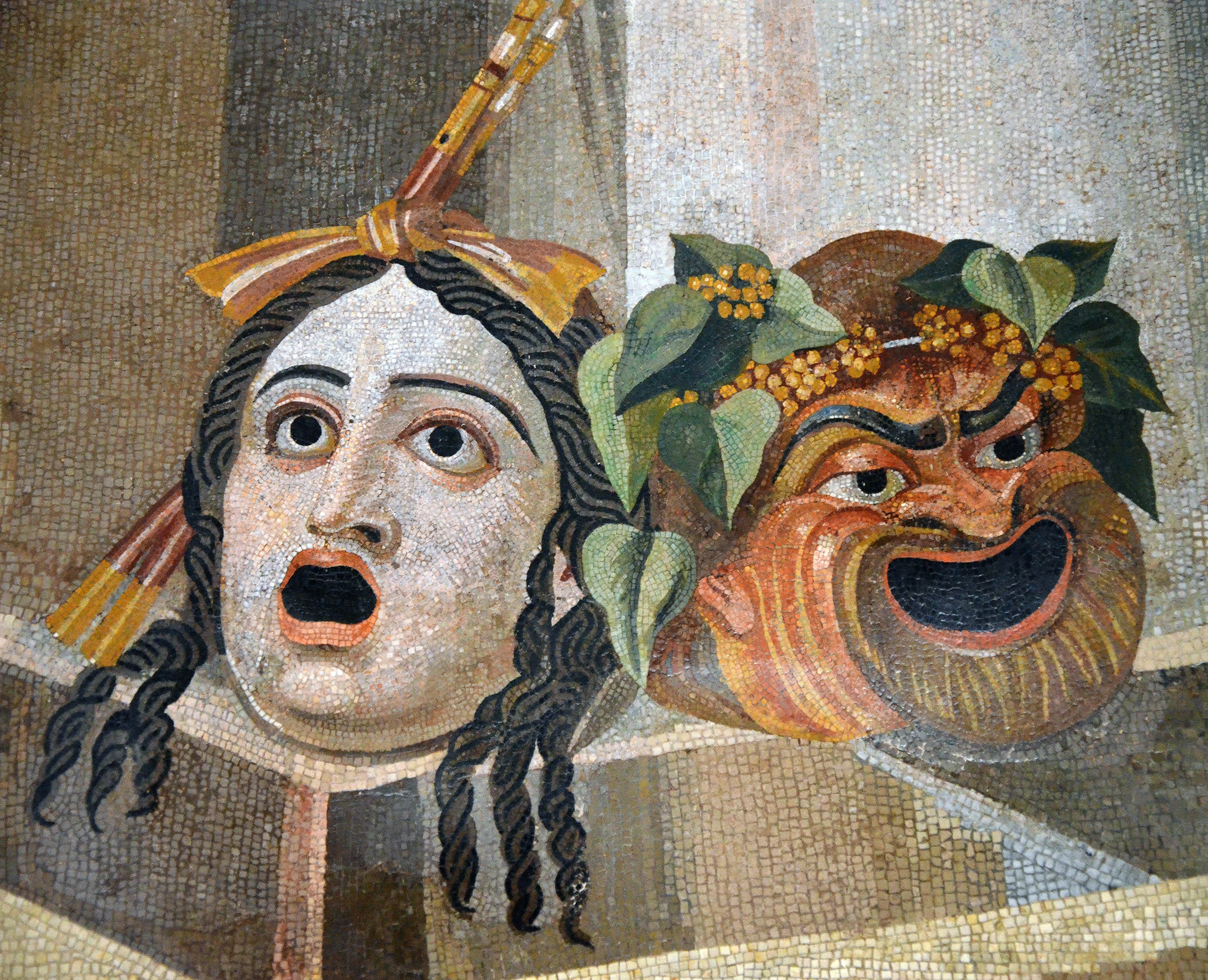
Theatrical masks of Tragedy and Comedy, Roman mosaic, 2nd century AD

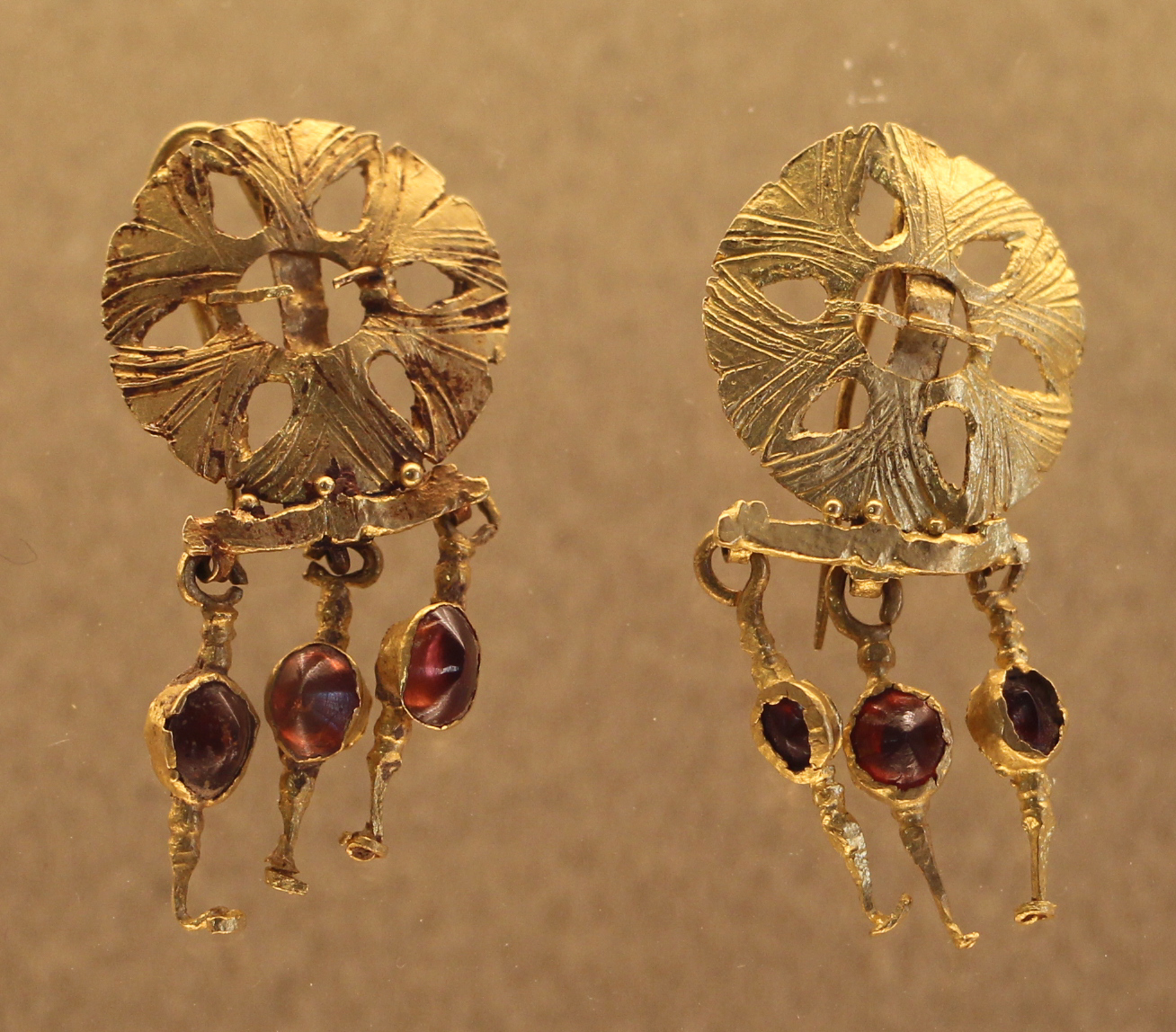
Ancient Roman earrings

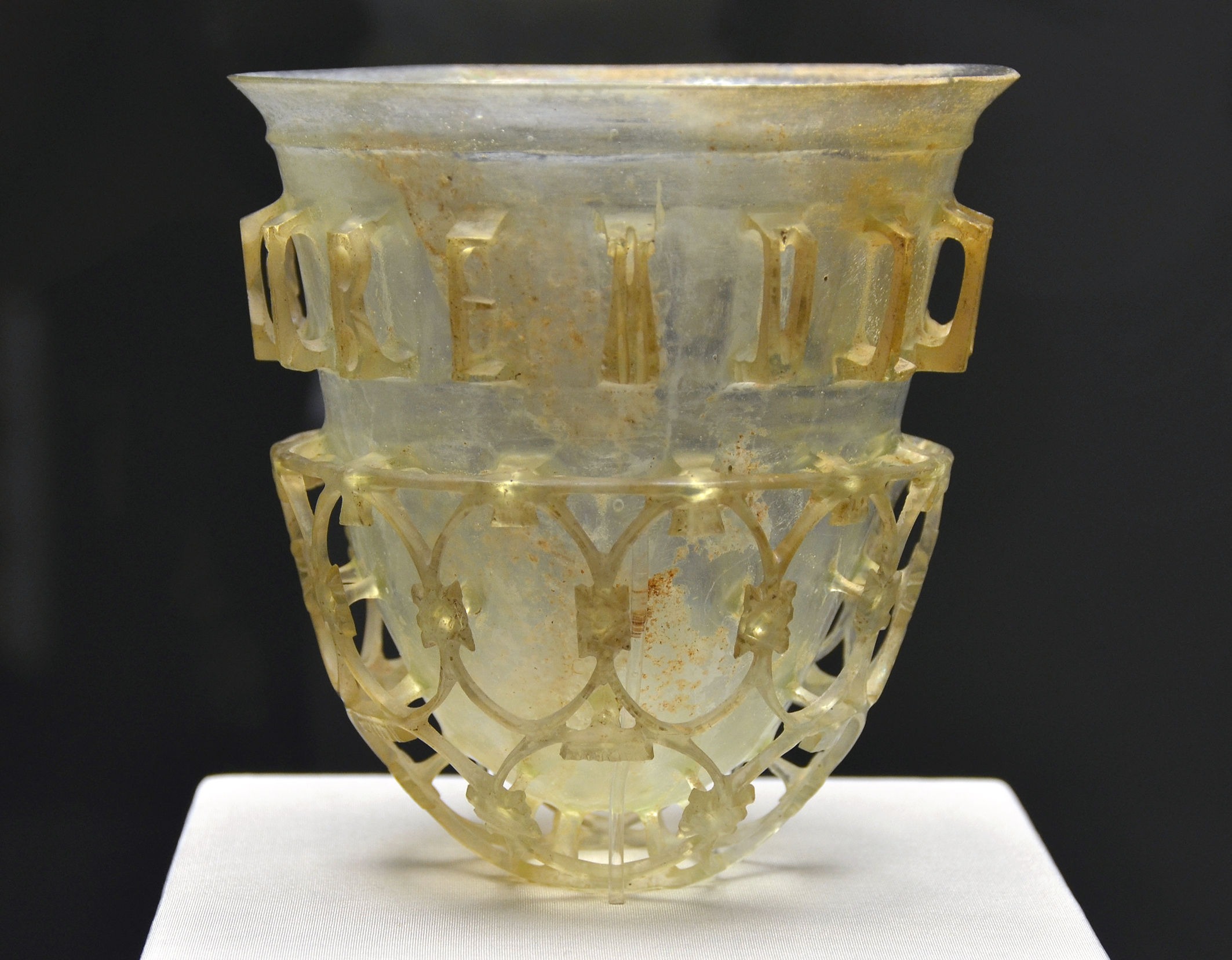
Roman cage cup, ca. 400 AD (Collection Staatliche Antikensammlung, Munich)

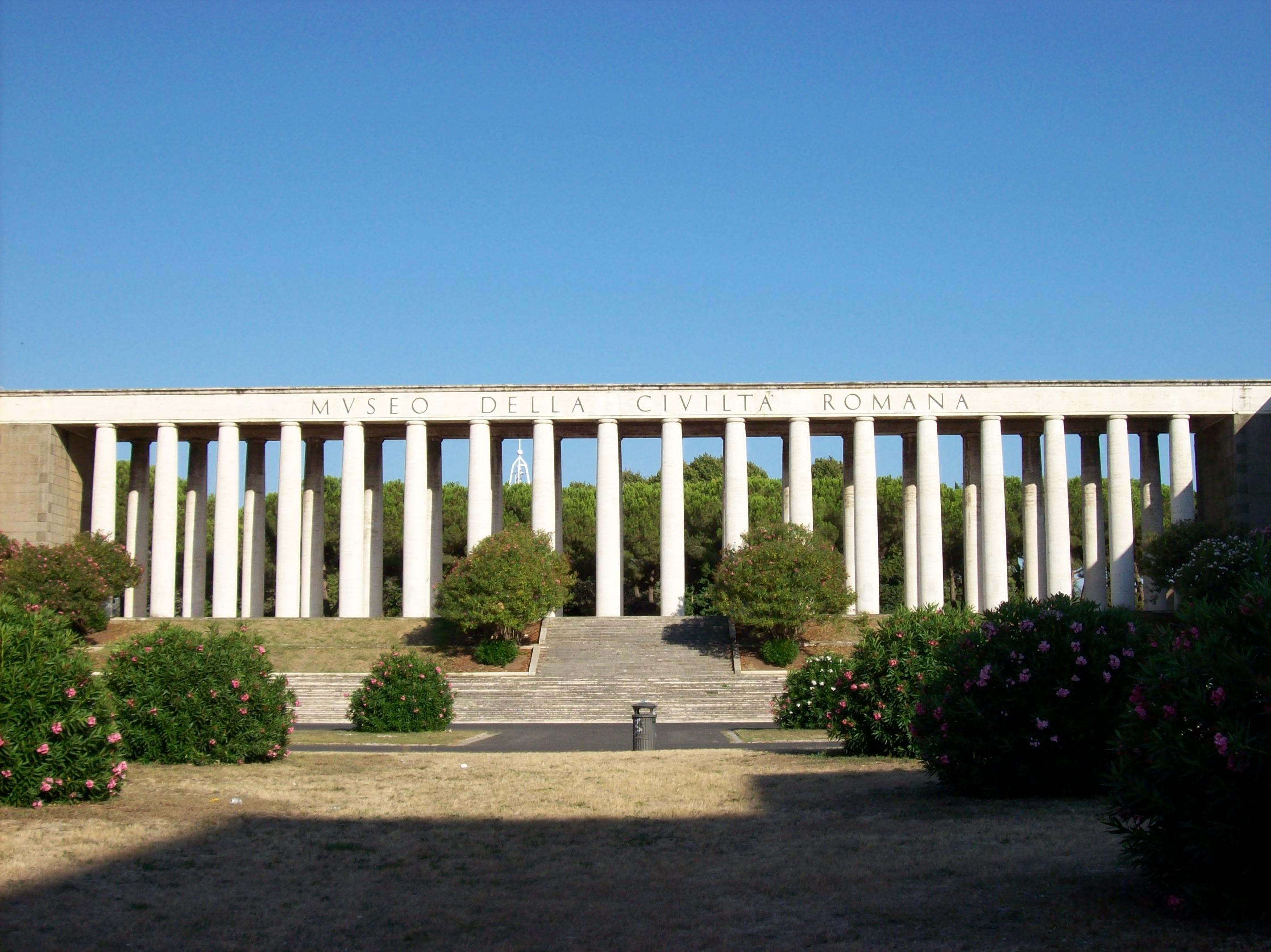
Museum of Roman Civilization, a museum in Rome devoted to aspects of the Ancient Roman civilization

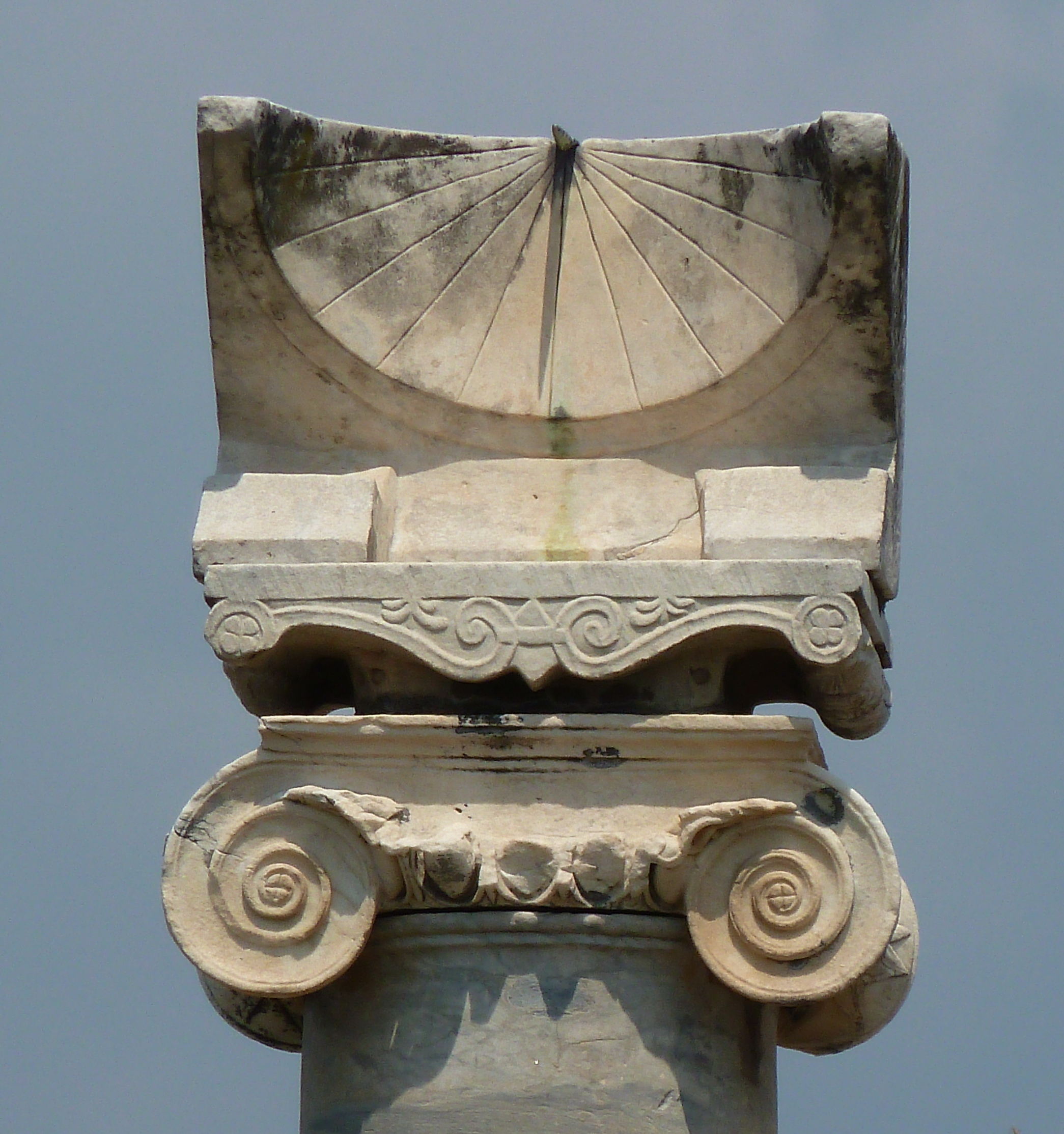
Sundial at the Temple of Apollo (Pompeii)

Culture of ancient Rome

=== Architecture of ancient Rome ===
Ancient Roman architecture

- Roman Architectural Revolution
  - Roman concrete
- Roman brick

Types of buildings and structures

- Roman amphitheatre
  - List of Roman amphitheatres
- Roman aqueduct
  - List of aqueducts in the city of Rome
  - List of aqueducts in the Roman Empire
- Roman bridge
  - List of Roman bridges
- Roman canal
- Roman circus
- Roman cistern
- Roman dams and reservoirs
- Roman defensive walls
- Roman domes
- Forum
  - Roman Forum
    - List of monuments of the Roman Forum
- Roman gardens
- Roman horreum
- Insula (building)
- Roman roads
- Roman roofs
- Roman temple
  - List of Ancient Roman temples
- Roman theatre
  - List of Roman theatres
- Thermae
  - List of Roman public baths
- Tholos
- Roman triumphal arches
- Roman villa
  - Villa rustica

=== Art in ancient Rome ===
Roman art

- Art collection in ancient Rome
- Decorative arts of ancient Rome
  - Ancient Roman pottery
  - Roman glass
  - Roman mosaic
- Literature
  - Augustan literature
    - Augustan poetry
- Music of ancient Rome
- Painting of ancient Rome
  - Pompeian Styles
- Sculpture of ancient Rome
  - Roman sculpture
  - Roman portraiture
- Theatre of ancient Rome
- Bathing in ancient Rome
- Calendar
  - Julian calendar
- Cuisine of ancient Rome
  - Food and dining in the Roman Empire
  - Baking in ancient Rome
  - Wine in Roman culture
    - Alban wine
    - Caecuban wine
    - Falernian wine
- Education in ancient Rome
  - Athenaeum
  - Paedagogus
- Fashion in ancient Rome
  - Clothing in ancient Rome
    - Abolla
    - Palla
    - Pallium
    - Stola
    - Synthesis
    - Toga
      - Angusticlavia
    - Trabea
  - Cosmetics in Ancient Rome
  - Roman hairstyles
    - Caesar cut
  - Roman jewelry
- Festivals
  - Ludi Romani
  - Lupercalia
  - Saturnalia
- Fiction set in ancient Rome
- Roman folklore
- Roman jokes
- Legacy of the Roman Empire
  - Museum of Roman Civilization
- Medicine in ancient Rome
  - Dentistry in ancient Rome
  - Disability in ancient Rome
  - Disease in Imperial Rome
  - Food and diet in ancient medicine
  - Gynecology in ancient Rome
  - Medical community of ancient Rome
  - Mental illness in ancient Rome
  - Surgery in ancient Rome
- Naming conventions
- People in ancient Rome
  - List of ancient Romans
- Philosophy in ancient Rome
- Public entertainment
  - Chariot racing
  - Gladiator combat
  - Ludi
- Sexuality in ancient Rome
  - Homosexuality in ancient Rome
  - Prostitution
- Technology
  - Engineering in ancient Rome
  - Units of measurement
    - Roman timekeeping
  - Sanitation in ancient Rome

=== Social order in ancient Rome ===
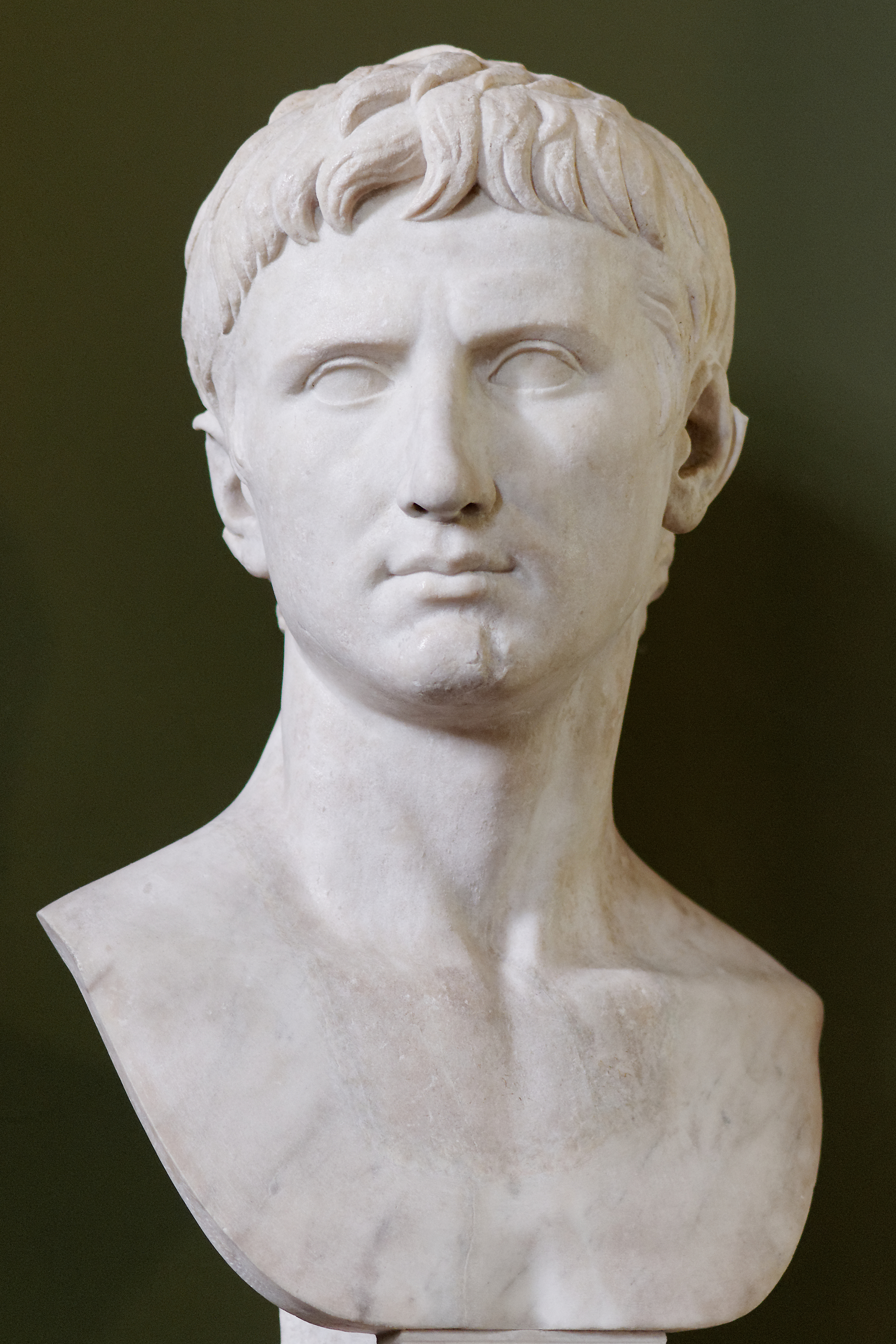
Augustus, possibly the most famous example of adoption in Ancient Rome

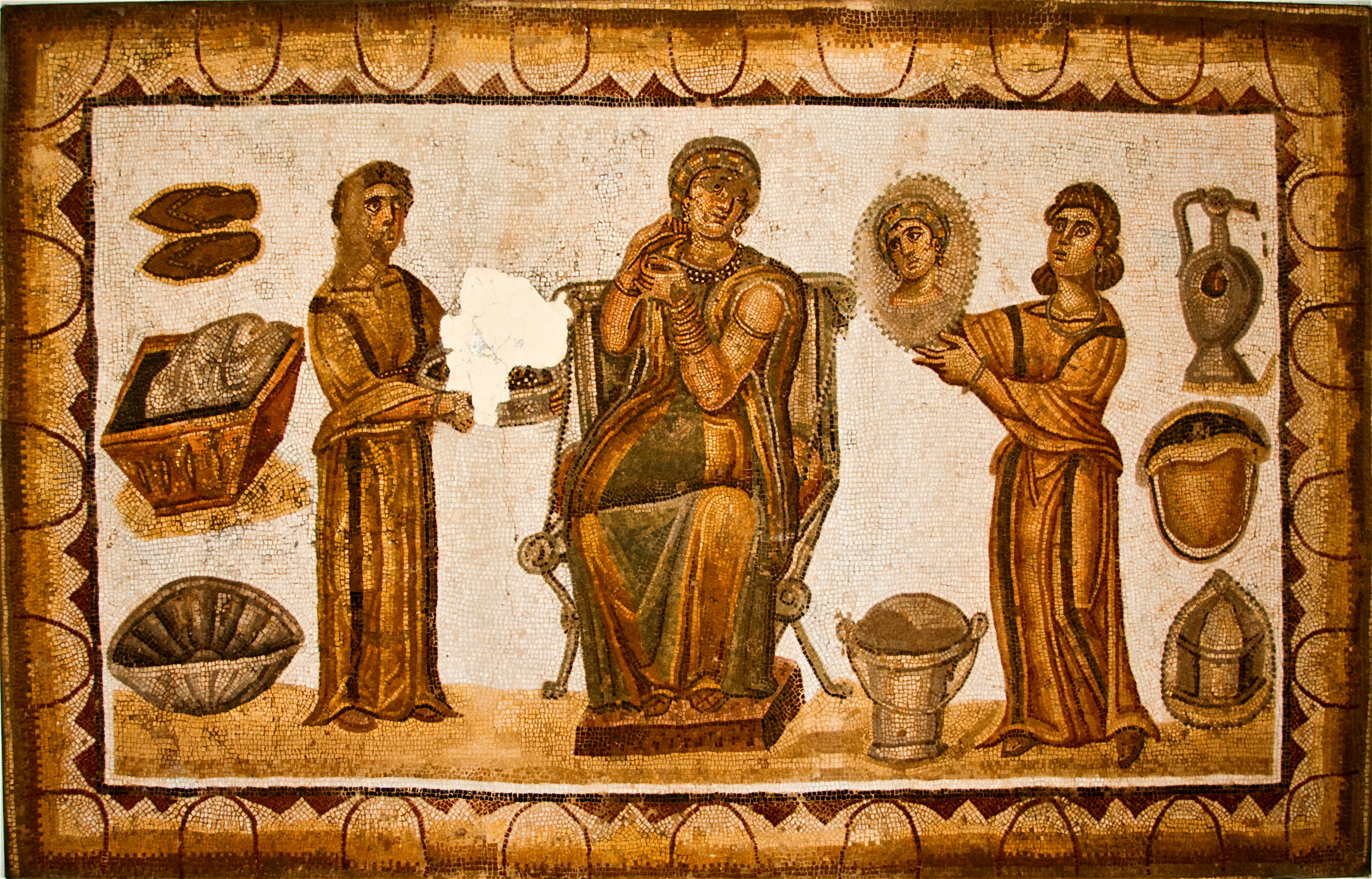
Mosaic depicting two female slaves (ancillae) attending their mistress (Carthage National Museum)

- Associations in Ancient Rome
  - Collegium
- Dignitas
- Family in ancient Rome
  - Pater familias
  - Adoption in ancient Rome
  - Birth registration in ancient Rome
  - Childhood in ancient Rome
- Marriage in ancient Rome
  - Confarreatio
  - Diffarreation
  - Manus marriage
  - Weddings in ancient Rome
- Mos maiorum
- Patronage in ancient Rome
- Roman citizenship
- Romanization
- Slavery in ancient Rome
- Social class in ancient Rome
  - Patricians
  - Equites
  - Plebs
    - Conflict of the Orders
    - Secessio plebis
  - Equestrian order
  - Gens
  - Tribes
  - Poverty in ancient Rome
- Women in ancient Rome
  - Naming conventions for women in ancient Rome

=== Religion in ancient Rome ===
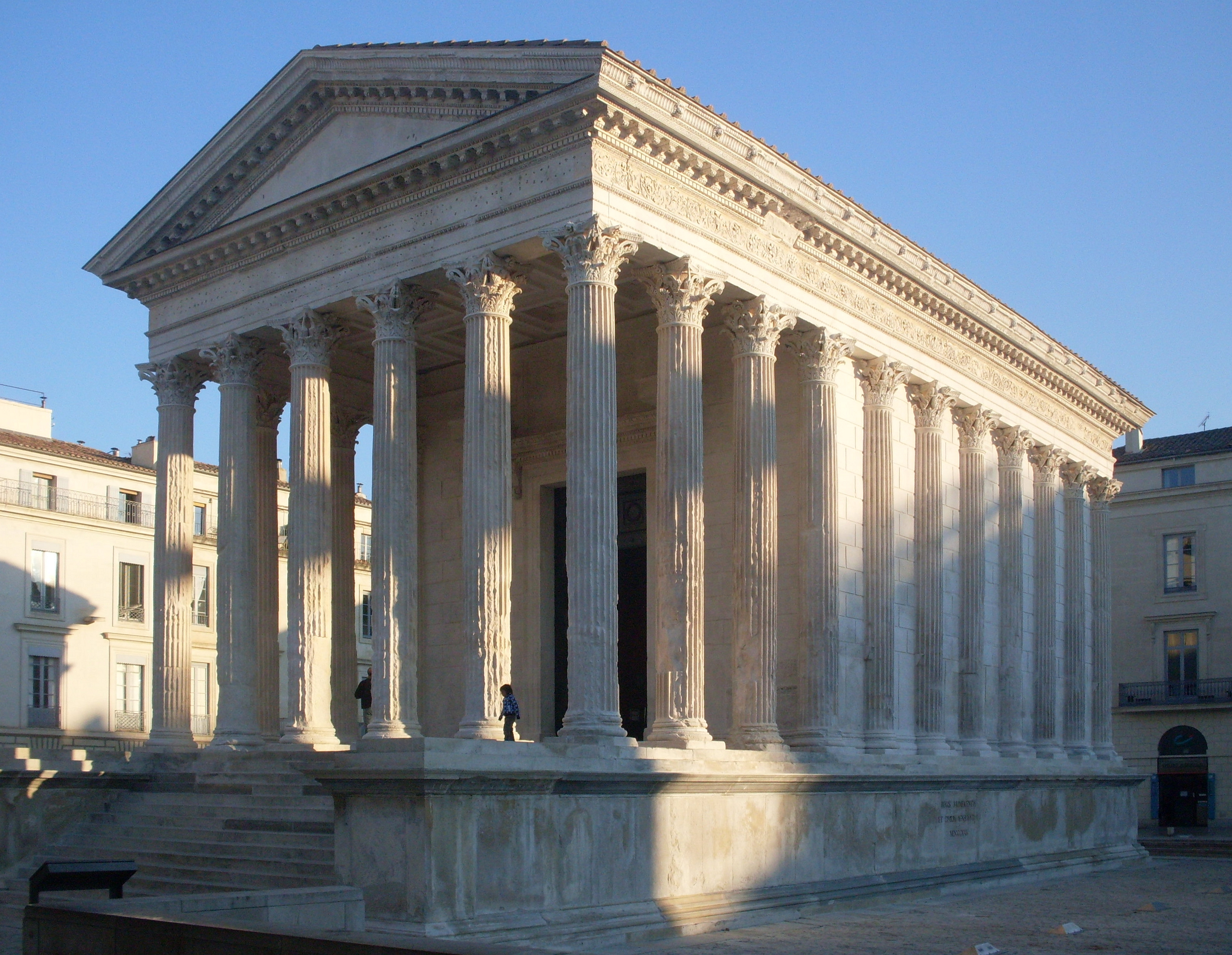
The Maison Carrée in Nîmes, a mid-sized provincial temple of the Augustan imperial cult

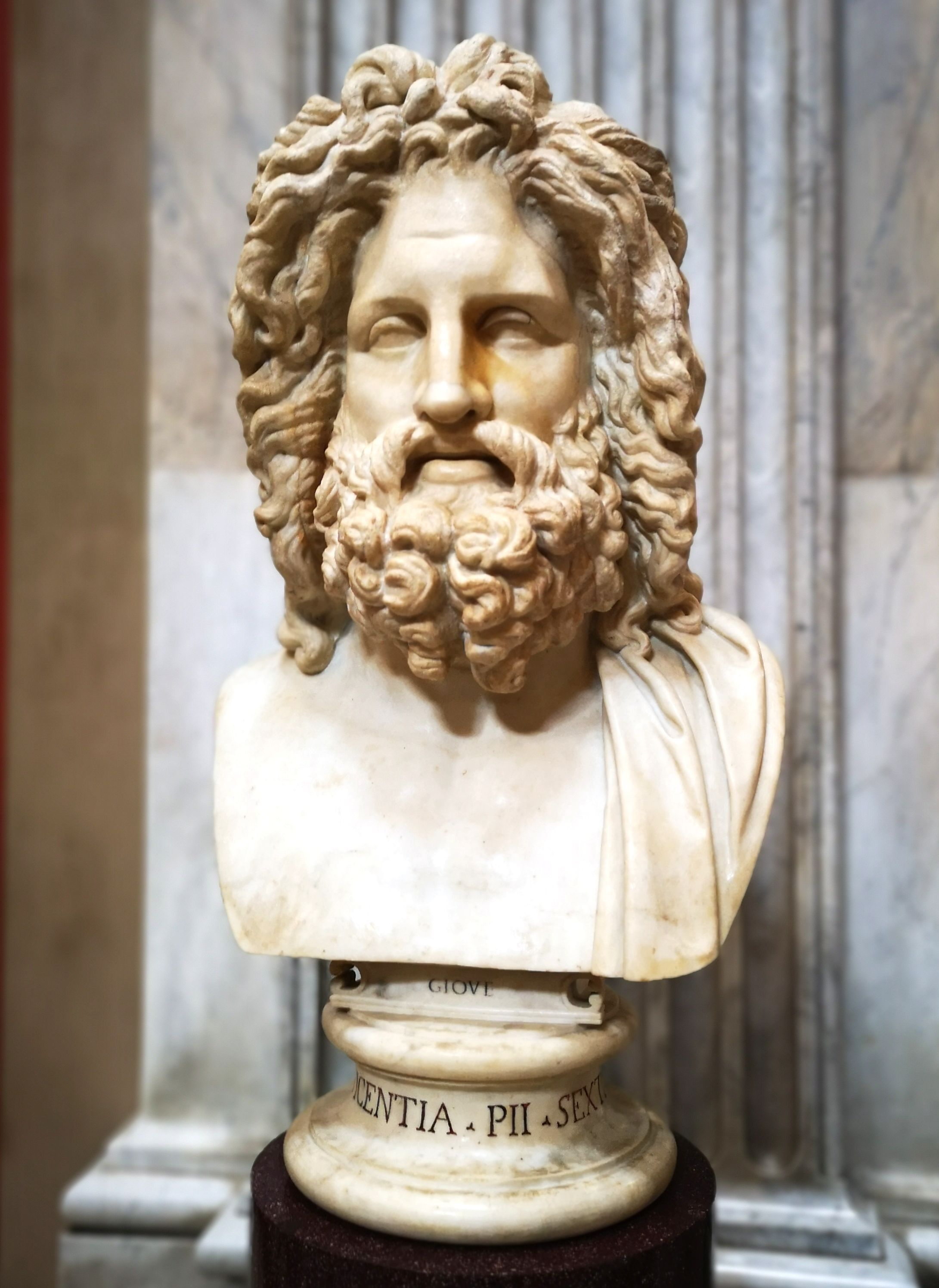
Statue of Jupiter, Vatican, Rome.

Religion in ancient Rome

- Christianity
- Imperial cult
- Persecution of pagans in the late Roman Empire
- Religious persecution in the Roman Empire

==== Roman mythology ====
Roman mythology

- Roman Gods
  - Capitoline Triad
    - Juno
    - Jupiter
    - Minerva
- Heroes
  - Hercules in ancient Rome
    - Great Altar of Hercules
    - Temple of Hercules Victor
- Roma (deity)

==== Roman religious institutions ====
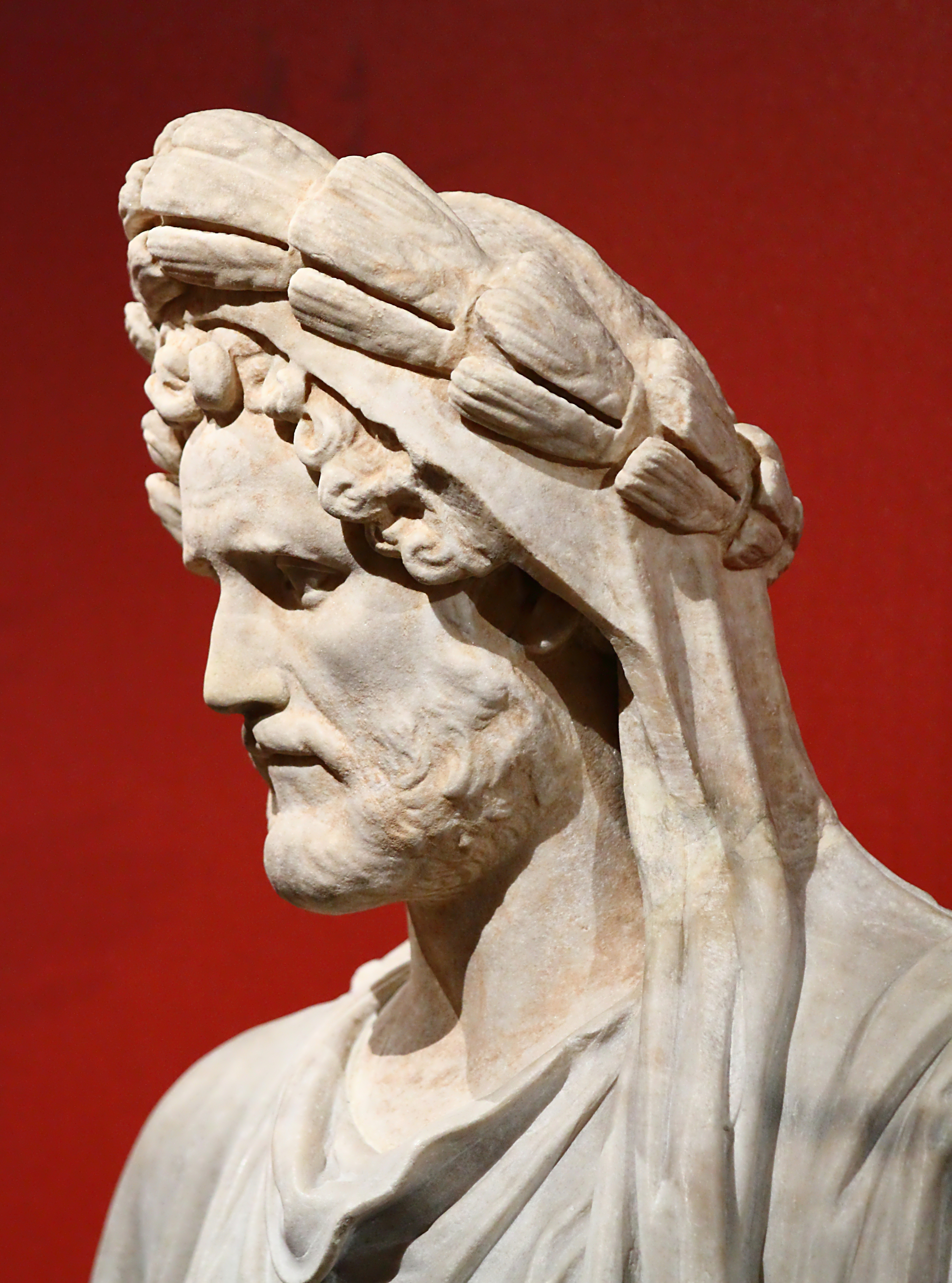
Portrait of the emperor Antoninus Pius in ritual attire

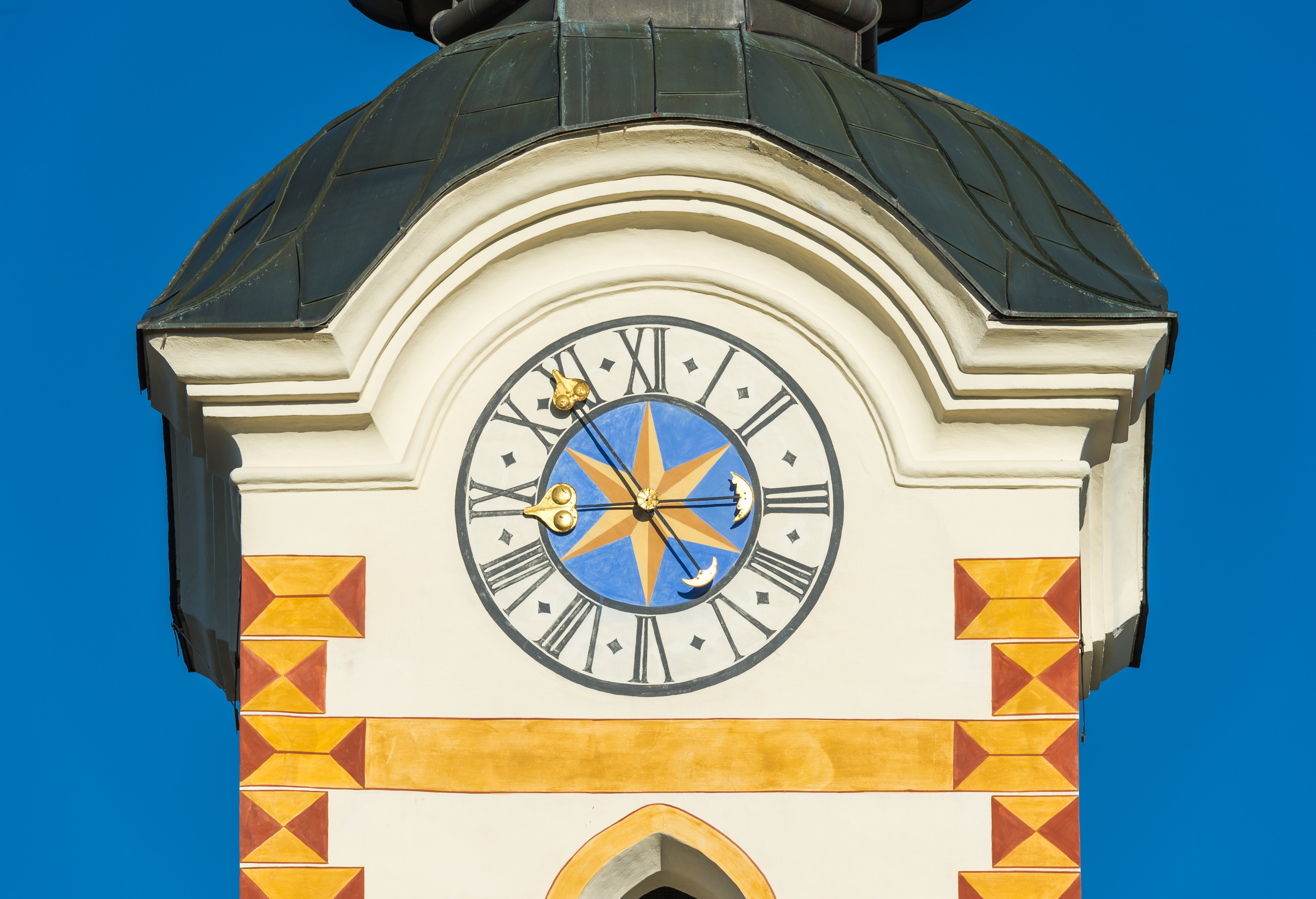
Roman numerals

- Collegium Pontificum
  - Vestal Virgin
  - Rex Sacrorum
  - Pontifex maximus
  - Flamen
- Augur
- Quindecimviri sacris faciundis
- Epulones

==== Roman religious practices ====
- Animal sacrifice
  - Lustratio
  - October Horse
  - Taurobolium
- Roman funerary practices
  - Roman funerary art
  - Roman sarcophagi

=== Language in ancient Rome ===
Latin

- Romance languages
- History of Latin
  - Old Latin
  - Classical Latin
  - Vulgar Latin
- Latin alphabet
  - Latin letters used in mathematics
- Roman numerals
- Latin phrases
- Latin-script calligraphy
  - Roman cursive
  - Roman square capitals
  - Rustic capitals

Languages of the Roman Empire

== Economy of ancient Rome ==
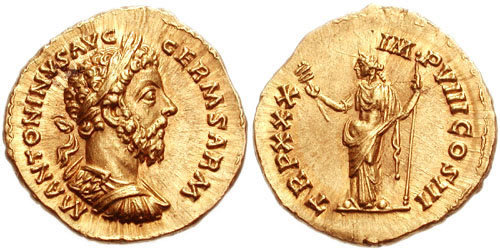
Aureus minted in AD 176 by Marcus Aurelius

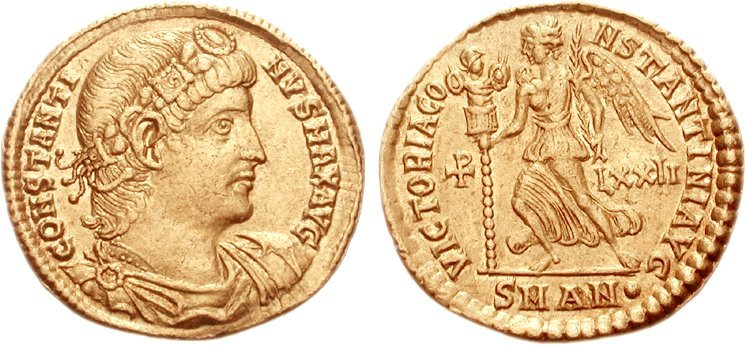
Solidus of Constantine I, minted in AD 335

Roman economy

- Roman agriculture
  - Deforestation
  - Grain supply to the city of Rome
- Roman commerce
  - Roman trade with China
  - Roman trade with India
- Roman finance
  - Banking in ancient Rome
  - Taxation in ancient Rome
- Roman currency
  - Roman Republican currency
  - Roman provincial currency
- Roman metallurgy
  - Mining in ancient Rome
    - Mining in Roman Britain

== Scholars ==
=== Ancient ===
- Apuleius
- Catullus
- Cassius Dio
- Aulus Cornelius Celsus
- Cicero
- Columella
- Curtius
- Frontinus
- Horace
- Julius Caesar
- Juvenal
- Livy
- Lucretius
- Nigidius Figulus
- Ovid
- Petronius
- Plautus
- Pliny the Elder
- Pliny the Younger
- Pomponius Mela
- Propertius
- Sallust
- Seneca the Elder
- Seneca the Younger
- Suetonius
- Tacitus
- Varro
- Virgil
- Vitruvius

=== Modern ===
- Edward Gibbon
- Mary Beard

== Ancient Roman lists ==
- Adjectival and demonymic forms of regions in Greco-Roman antiquity
- Alphabetized list of notable ancient Romans
- Glossary of ancient Roman religion
- Ancient monuments in Rome
- Ancient Roman fasti
- Ancient Roman temples
- Ancient Romans
- Aqueducts in the city of Rome
- Aqueducts in the Roman Empire
- Censors of the Roman Republic
- Cities founded by the Romans
- Civil wars and revolts
- Condemned Roman emperors
- Governors of Roman Britain
- Late Roman provinces
- Monuments of the Roman Forum
- Roman amphitheatres
- Roman aqueducts by date
- Roman army unit types
- Roman auxiliary regiments
- Roman basilicas
- Roman bridges
- Roman canals
- Roman cisterns
- Roman consuls
- Roman dams and reservoirs
- Roman deities
- Roman dictators
- Roman dynasties
- Roman domes
- Roman emperors
- Roman generals
- Roman gentes
- Roman imperial victory titles
- Roman laws
- Roman legions
- Roman moneyers during the Republic
- Roman praetors
- Roman public baths
- Roman taxes
- Roman theatres
- Roman tribunes
- Roman triumphal arches
- Roman usurpers
- Roman wars and battles
- Thirty Tyrants

== See also ==
- Outline of Rome
- Outline of the Byzantine Empire
- Outline of classical studies
- Daqin
- Fiction set in ancient Rome
- Index of ancient Rome–related articles
