= History of the Constitution of the Late Roman Empire =

The History of the Constitution of the Late Roman Empire is a study of the ancient Roman Empire that traces the progression of Roman political development from the abolition of the Roman Principate around the year 200 until the fall of the Western Roman Empire in 476 CE. When Diocletian became Roman Emperor in 284 CE, he inherited a constitution that was no longer functioning, and so he enacted the most significant constitutional reforms in over 300 years. His reforms, much like those 300 years before, were intended to correct the errors in the previous constitution. Diocletian's specific reforms were less radical than was the reality that he exposed the state of government for what it had been for centuries: monarchy. With Diocletian's reforms the Principate was abolished, and a new system, the Dominate (Latin: "lord" or "master"), was established.

== The state of the empire at the end of the Principate ==
Between the death of the emperor Septimius Severus in 211, and the accession of Diocletian in 284, twenty-three emperors had been installed and then killed. Almost all of these emperors owed their elevation to the force of arms, and were able to maintain power so long as they both kept favour with their armed supporters, and prevented the emergence of a rival. Thus, the army and the Praetorian Guard became the true power behind the throne. This phenomenon, where the military could act as a political force, illustrated a major constitutional dysfunction, which derived from the fact that there was no universally accepted mechanism to facilitate the installation of new emperors. The result of this chaos was the accession of the emperor Diocletian to the throne. While the twenty-three emperors before Diocletian all encountered similar problems, the reign of the emperor Gallienus can be used as a typical example to illustrate the state of the empire during this period. Gallienus reigned from 260 to 268, and during his reign no part of the empire (other than possibly Africa) escaped devastation at the hands of the barbarians. In the east, the Persians had overrun Syria, and captured Gallienus' father and co-emperor, Valerian, while in the north, the Goths invaded Roman territory, and sacked towns as far south as Athens and Corinth. Also in the north, the Alemanni penetrated deep into Roman territory, encountering no serious opposition until they reached Ravenna, while the Franks passed through Gaul, and sacked towns in Spain. These invasions were primarily raiding expeditions, and the invaders usually retreated back to their own territory after their lust for booty had been satisfied. While no major loss of territory resulted from these raids, the sacked towns were laid to waste, commerce throughout the empire was devastated, and entire economies collapsed. One consequence of this situation was the emergence of usurpers, who often came in the form of provincial governors. The citizens in the provinces often had a common enemy, and usually could not rely on Rome for protection. Thus, their loyalty to the emperor was seriously impaired, and they turned to their governors for leadership. The governors began assuming titles that did not legally belong to them, which resulted in a virtual dismemberment of the empire.

One example of these usurpers was Postumus, who was governor of Gaul (modern France) during Gallienus' reign. After he had driven back an invading army of Franks, his troops saluted him as emperor, and while he did not use his new-found power to march on Rome, he did establish his own empire in Gaul. He established a court, appointed generals, and proclaimed himself Consul and pontifex maximus, which in effect, made his empire in Gaul a mirror image of the Roman Empire. In 268, he was succeeded by another governor, Tetricus. Tetricus seems to have added Spain to his empire. In 273, the Roman Emperor Aurelian forced Tetricus to resign, and re-established Roman rule over his territory. While the rule of Postumus and Tetricus was never formally recognized by Rome, the rule of the governor Odaenathus over the province of Palmyra was formally recognized by Rome. Odaenathus made himself king and his wife, Zenobia, queen. Rome did not object to this, and he was given control over Asia, and was allowed to appoint governors and generals. While Odaenathus recognized the authority of the emperor Gallienus, Zenobia did not, and in 269 she took an army and conquered Egypt. In 271, the Roman Emperor Probus drove her out of Egypt, and quickly reacquired the province of Palmyra.

== The constitution of Diocletian ==
When Diocletian became Roman Emperor in 284, the military situation had mostly stabilized, although shortly after he came to power general Carausius tried to usurp the throne. Still, the relative stability in the empire allowed Diocletian to enact badly needed constitutional reforms. His constitutional reforms and the earlier military successes by soldier Aurelian and Probus have been credited to have allowed the Roman empire to continue its existence. Diocletian divided the empire into east and west. Each half was to be ruled by one of two co-emperors, called the Augusti. He then resurrected the precedent set by Hadrian, and ensured that each emperor named his successor early in his reign. Diocletian called that successor a Caesar. Diocletian then created a bureaucratic apparatus that was similar to the system that Hadrian had created, where each office had a defined set of responsibilities, a set rank, and a set path of promotion. In this administrative system, Diocletian followed the example that had been set by Domitian, and divided the empire into small administrative units. He also assigned to the four tetrarchs (the two Augusti and the two Caesares) honorary titles and insignia that had been used by Domitian. Diocletian simply took concepts that had either been developed, or were underdeveloped, and streamlined them into a single constitution. One important consequence of these reforms was that the fiction of a free republic finally gave way to naked autocracy. The illusion of shared power between the emperor and Senate was finally extinguished and the centuries-old reality of monarchy became obvious.

When Diocletian resigned, chaos ensued, but after the chaos had subsided, most of his reforms remained in effect. While the emperor Constantine enacted some revisions to this constitution, the most significant change over the centuries was in the abolition of the Caesares. Ultimately this constitution survived, in one form or another, until the Roman Empire fell in 476. Diocletian's division of the empire into west and east set the stage for ages to come, and was a significant factor behind the ultimate division of the Christian church into western Roman Catholic and eastern Greek Orthodox, while his division of the empire into prefectures and dioceses is used by the Catholic Church to this day.

== See also ==
- Roman Kingdom
- Roman Republic
- Roman Empire
- Roman Law
- Plebeian Council
- Centuria
- Curia
- Roman consul
- Praetor
- Roman censor
- Quaestor
- Aedile
- Roman Dictator
- Master of the Horse
- Roman Senate
- Cursus honorum
- Byzantine Senate
- Pontifex Maximus
- Princeps senatus
- Interrex
- Promagistrate
- Acta Senatus
