= History of the Constitution of the Roman Empire =

The history of the constitution of the Roman Empire began with the establishment of the Principate in 27 BC and is considered to conclude with the abolition of that constitutional structure in favour of the Dominate at Diocletian's accession in AD 284.

The Roman Empire's constitution emerged as a transformation of the late Roman Republic's constitution, utilising various late republican precedents, to legitimise the granting of incredible legal powers to one man and the centralisation of legal powers into bodies which that man controlled.

The creation of the Principate and the Roman Empire is traditionally dated to 27 BC with the first Augustan constitutional settlement, where Octavian, the victor of the final war of the Roman Republic, gave up his extraordinary powers and was vested with proconsular authority over the imperial provinces, which he held along with the tribunician power granted to him by the Senate in 36 BC. Concurrently, he held the Roman consulship, granting him authority within the ordinary legal structure which did not exceed any of the other magistrates. By holding various republican offices, Augustus, as Octavian was known after 27 BC, was able to disguise the autocratic nature of his regime and claim a restoration of the Republic. After more constitutional changes in 23 BC, Augustus was granted greater proconsular authority over all imperial provinces, which allowed him to override any other Roman governors, marking the completion of the various offices that most Roman emperors would hold until the transformation of the Principate into the Dominate in the late third century.

Various other changes were affected over the course of the Empire, reducing the electoral powers of the various Roman assemblies and shifting those powers to the Senate, as well as doing away with elections entirely in favour of appointments by the emperor.

== Augustus' constitutional reforms ==
Octavian returned to Rome two years after defeating Mark Antony at the Battle of Actium. With Mark Antony's defeat, no one remained to oppose Octavian. Decades of war had taken a terrible toll on the People of Rome. The political situation was unstable, and there was a constant threat of renewed warfare. Octavian's arrival alone caused a wave of optimism to ripple throughout Italy. As soon as he arrived, he began addressing the problems that were plaguing Rome. He declared a general amnesty for the former supporters of his enemies, and provided land for over 120,000 former soldiers. As soon as these reforms had been implemented, the price of land began to rise and trade was revived. Octavian's popularity soon reached new heights, which ultimately gave him the support he needed to implement his reforms. When Octavian deposed Mark Antony in 32 BC, he resigned his position as triumvir, but was probably vested with powers similar to those that he had given up. In 29 BC, another alteration was made to his legal status, of which we know very little. We know that it involved the granting to Octavian of Consular imperium (command authority), and thus control over the army and the provinces. This alteration probably also gave him the authority to take a census.

Octavian wanted to solidify his status as master of the state, but avoid the fate of his adopted father. On January 13 of 27 BC, Octavian transferred control of the state back to the Senate and the People of Rome, but, in all likelihood, he knew what the result of such a move would be. Without Octavian, Rome could again descend into chaos and civil war. Neither the Senate nor the People of Rome were willing to accept what was, in effect, Octavian's resignation, and thus Octavian was allowed to remain Roman Consul (the chief-executive under the old Republic), and was also allowed to retain his tribunician powers. Under this arrangement, Octavian now had colleagues who could veto any of his actions. He was probably concerned that his former position appeared to be too monarchical. Now, while he appeared to be re-integrated into the constitutional apparatus, his prestige removed any real risk that a colleague might attempt to obstruct him. This arrangement, in effect, functioned as a popular ratification of his position within the state. If the Senate and the People of Rome wouldn't let him leave office, so the theory went, then he could not be considered a tyrant. The senate then granted Octavian a unique grade of Proconsular imperium (Proconsular command authority) for a period of ten years. With this particular grade of power, he was given power and authority over all Proconsuls. Under the old republic, the Proconsuls governed the more challenging provinces. Therefore, the legions were mostly stationed in these provinces. Under the old system, the Praetors and Pro-Praetors governed the more stable provinces. These provinces, therefore, had very little military infrastructure. Octavian allowed the senate to retain control over these Praetorial provinces. While this appeared to be a sharing of power between Octavian and the senate, the actual result was that Octavian now controlled most of the Roman army. Octavian was also granted the title of "Augustus" by the senate and was made the master of the state by the Senate and the People of Rome. He also took the title of Princeps, or "first citizen". In this, he attempted to establish himself as the "first among equals" rather than as a king, since even by this point in time, monarchy was still repugnant to most Romans. He had taken the dictatorial powers that his adopted father had taken almost twenty years before, but had done so in the spirit of the republican constitution.

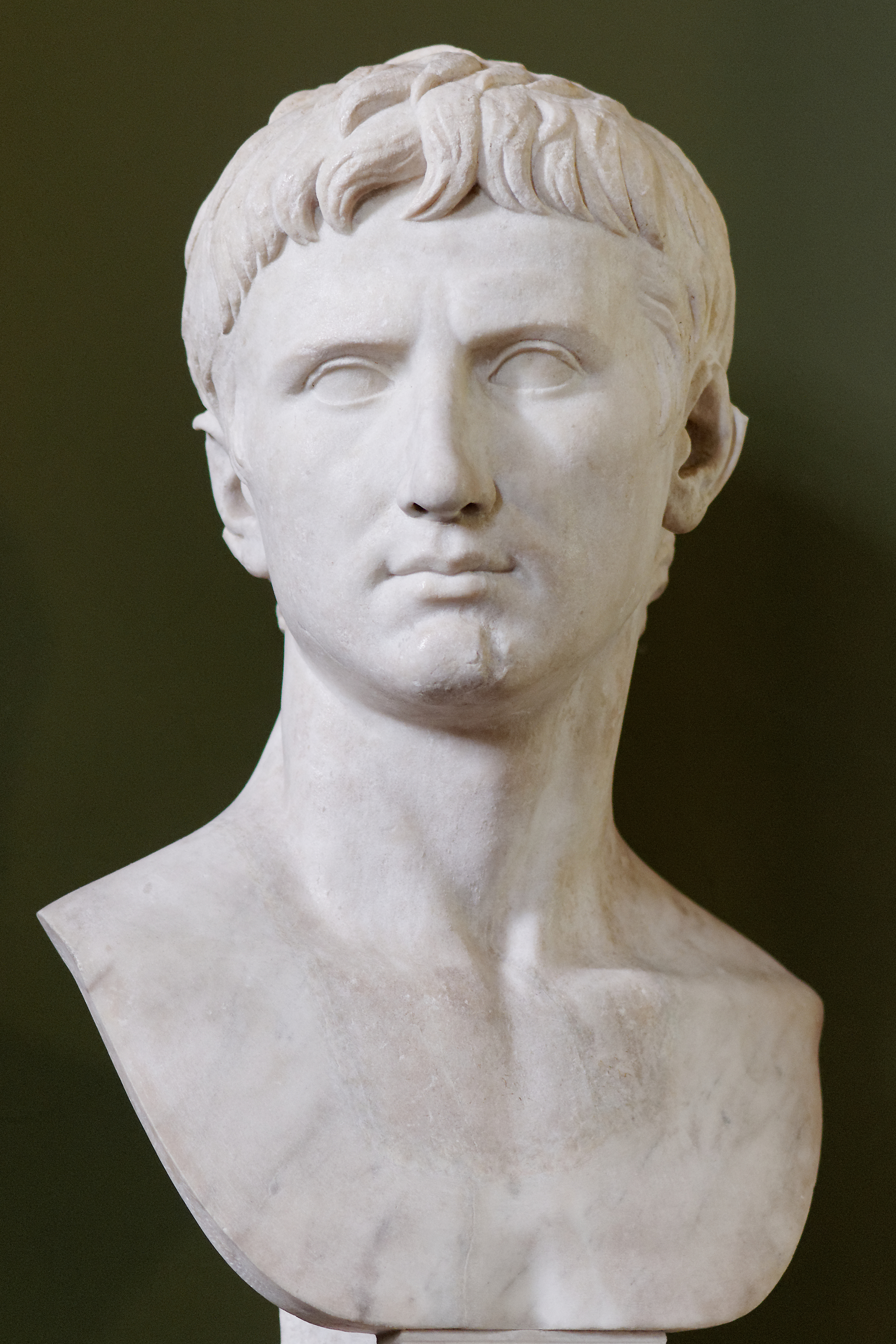
Augustus, the first Roman Emperor

In 23 BC, Augustus (as Octavian now called himself) again attempted to reform the constitution, although it is not known why he chose to reform the constitution at this point. Four years had passed since his last reforms, and this may have given him the opportunity to discover the weaknesses in those reforms. In addition, he almost died in 23 BC, and thus he may have thought that his time left was short. To Augustus, one major weakness in his constitution was his status as Consul. While it is true that his prestige minimized the risk of obstruction at the hands of a co-Consul, this risk still existed. It was also unusual (and unprecedented) for an individual to be elected to the Consulship nine times in a row, as Augustus had been. In addition, tradition did subject the Consulship to certain restrictions, such as the traditional etiquette shown by the two Consuls towards each other. While Augustus did consider the possibility to making himself sole Consul, he realized that this was too radical of a departure from tradition. Therefore, as a 'concession', he gave up his Consulship, and modified both his Proconsular imperium and his Tribunician powers. It is not known exactly how Augustus modified his Proconsular imperium, but it is known that he was allowed to retain this imperium in the city of Rome. Normally, any magistrate had to surrender their imperium while they were inside the city. In addition, his Proconsular imperium was formally modified to give him both a status and an authority above even a Consul.

Since these changes gave him an unprecedented ability to coerce citizens, he risked damaging his popularity. To compensate for this risk, he had his tribunician powers (potestas tribunicia) modified. The Tribunate was a natural fit for an autocrat who sought to maintain popularity with the people. The Tribunate was a popular office, because it had been the principal vehicle through which plebeians gained political power and through which they had been protected against the abuses of the state. The "Plebeian Tribunes" had strong positive powers, such as the right to convene the Plebeian Council, and strong negative powers, such as the right to veto an act of the senate. In addition, by history and precedent, the Tribunate, unlike the Consulship, was radical by nature. Augustus' modifications didn't change the actual powers associated with the office, but instead, Augustus simply displayed his tribunician status more vividly. While he had held tribunician powers since 36 BC, these powers were never renewed. After 23 BC, however, he had these powers renewed every year. In official documents, he indicated the number of years that had elapsed since he first held tribunician power. After these reforms had been instituted, Augustus never again altered his constitution. At various points, the people demanded that he take more powers, but he refused. In a few instances, he had to exercise powers that he did not legally have, but he usually acquired these powers by securing the passage of temporary legislation.

Augustus' final goal was to figure out a method to ensure an orderly succession. Under Augustus' constitution, the Senate and the People of Rome held the supreme power, and all of his special powers were granted for either a fixed term, or for life. Therefore, Augustus could not transfer his powers to a successor upon his death. Any successor needed to have powers that were independent of Augustus' own powers. During his illness in 23 BC, he had chosen Agrippa to be his successor. He had considered the possibility of making his nephew Marcellus his successor, but had ultimately decided that Marcellus was too young. In 21 BC Marcellus died and Augustus married Agrippa to his daughter Julia, and in 18 BC Augustus enacted a law that granted Agrippa tribunician powers for a period of five years. Agrippa and Julia had two sons, Gaius and Lucius Caesar, and Augustus designated them as possible heirs by granting upon both tribunician powers. In 12 BC Agrippa died, and in 6 BC Augustus granted these tribunician powers to his stepson Tiberius. Gaius and Lucius Caesar soon died, and Augustus realized that he had no choice but to recognize Tiberius as his heir. In 13 AD, the point was settled beyond question. A law was passed (the lex consularis) which linked Augustus' powers over the provinces to those of Tiberius, so that now Tiberius' legal powers were equivalent to, and independent from, those of Augustus. Within a year, Augustus was dead.

== From Tiberius to Vitellius ==
When Augustus died in 14 AD, the Principate legally ended. While Augustus had granted Tiberius the legal standing that he needed in order to become Princeps (i.e., Roman Emperor), Augustus could not legally make Tiberius Princeps. However, Tiberius' legal powers, as well as his status as the chosen heir of Augustus, gave him an opportunity that his ambition could not refuse. Tiberius knew that if he secured the support of the army, the rest of the government would soon follow. Therefore, Tiberius assumed command of the Praetorian Guard, and used his Proconsular imperium to force the armies to swear allegiance to him. As soon as this occurred, the senate and the magistrates acquiesced. Tiberius' efforts were so successful, that when the senate declared him Princeps, he made his acceptance appear to be a concession to the demands of the senators. Under Tiberius, the power to elect magistrates was transferred from the assemblies to the senate. Now, the assemblies were only used to hear the results of magisterial elections. In addition, they did retain some theoretical legislative powers. When Tiberius died, Caligula was proclaimed emperor by the senate. Caligula transferred the electoral powers back to the assemblies, but then quickly returned those powers to the senate. In 41 Caligula was assassinated, and for two days following his assassination, the senate debated the merits of restoring the republic. Due to the demands of the army, however, Claudius was ultimately declared emperor. Claudius' antiquarian interests resulted in his attempts to revive the old Censorship, and to return some degree of independence back to the senate. Ultimately, Claudius was killed, and Nero was declared emperor.

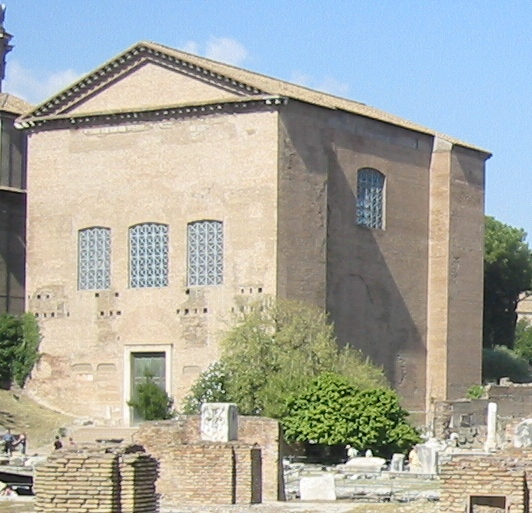
The Curia Julia in the Roman Forum, the seat of the imperial Senate

Arguably, the most significant flaw in the constitution left by Augustus concerned the matter of succession. This deadly flaw was violently exposed in the year 69. Augustus had established a standing army, where individual soldiers served under the same military governors in the same provinces over an extended period of time. The consequence was that the soldiers in the provinces developed a degree of loyalty to their commanders, which they did not have for the emperor. Thus the empire was, in a sense, a union of inchoate principalities, which could have disintegrated at any time. The first indication of a nationalist movement appeared in Gaul (modern France) in 68, but this movement ended when its leader, C. Julius Vindex, was defeated by an army under L. Verginius Rufus. Rufus was the governor of Upper Germany, and while he was declared imperator by his soldiers, he decided not to use his support to march on Rome and make himself emperor. He did not decline this opportunity because he was loyal to the emperor Nero, but rather because of his own low birth, and his belief that his low birth might make it difficult for him to accomplish anything as emperor. Shortly after Rufus had been declared imperator, Ser. Sulpicius Galba, the governor of Hispania Tarraconensis, was proclaimed emperor by his troops. In Rome, the emperor Nero quickly lost his supporters and committed suicide. Galba, however, did not prove to be a wise leader. He chose to punish Rufus' troops, and to antagonize the Praetorian Guard by not fulfilling promises which had been made to them.

The governor of Lower Germany, A. Vitellius, was soon proclaimed emperor by his troops, and in Rome, the Praetorian Guard proclaimed M. Salvius Otho emperor. In January 69, Galba was assassinated, and the senate proclaimed Otho emperor. Otho took an army to Germany to defeat Vitellius, but was himself defeated by Vitellius. He committed suicide, and Vitellius was proclaimed emperor by the senate. Another general, Vespasian, soon defeated Vitellius. Vitellius was executed, and Vespasian was named Augustus, elected Consul, and given Tribunician powers. The result of these events illustrated a key weakness in Augustus' constitution. The method of succession was in part based on heredity, and if a dead emperor's next-of-kin had the support of the Praetorian Guard, then his installation as emperor was reasonably assured. However, with Nero's death, the Julian line had been extinguished. Thus, the events of 69 showed that the armies in the provinces were the ultimate 'electoral bodies', and that any successful general could legitimately claim a right to the throne. It also became apparent that, while the senate might acquiesce to the installation of a new emperor, such acquiescence was simply a matter of form. This flaw would contribute to the ultimate fall of the Roman Empire.

== The Flavian emperors ==
Under the emperor Vespasian, the Roman constitution began a slide toward outright monarchy. Vespasian appointed citizens throughout the empire to the senate, and granted many more citizenship. Before Vespasian, one usually had to be elected to a magisterial office before they could become a senator. Since the senate elected individuals to magisterial offices, the senate controlled its own membership, but under Vespasian, the senate lost this power. This act alone weakened the prestige, and thus the power, of both the senate and the magisterial offices. Under Vespasian, the senate returned to its original role as an advisory council. Vespasian's reforms, however, did a great deal to strengthen the empire. The honors which the emperor now bestowed upon citizens were highly sought after. Individuals who had received such honors were proud of them, and as a consequence became more loyal to the emperor, while individuals who had not yet received such honors sought to earn them. Several future emperors (such as Trajan, Hadrian, and Marcus Aurelius) emerged as a consequence of these reforms. Despite the success that Vespasian had in strengthening the empire, he failed to address the issue of succession, although he may have chosen not to address this issue because, with two sons, he was easily able to secure the accession of his own successor. He had made his son, Titus, his colleague in both the Consulship and the Censorship, granted him the tribunician powers, and following his successes in Judea, granted him the honorary title of imperator. Vespasian died in 79.

Domitian's reign marked a significant turning point on the road to monarchy. After making himself Consul for ten years, Domitian made himself Censor for life, and unlike his father, he used these powers to further subjugate the senate by controlling its membership. He also changed the law so that he could preside over capital trials against senators. The manner in which he was able to dominate his Consular colleagues helped to further illustrate the powerlessness of the Consulship. To reduce the risk of an armed uprising against him, Domitian ensured that no single general could command more than two legions at once. Domitian did, however, divide the empire into smaller administrative units. This system was quite efficient, and was revived two centuries later by the emperor Diocletian. Domitian, ultimately, was a tyrant with the character which always makes tyranny repulsive, and this derived in part from his own paranoia. Since he had no son, and thus no obvious heir, he was constantly in danger of being overthrown. Thus, the unresolved issue of succession again proved to be deadly, and in September 96, Domitian was murdered.

== From Nerva to the abolition of the Principate ==
Nerva, who was elected by the Senate, reversed some of the abuses committed by Domitian, such as the practice of prosecuting individuals for disrespecting the emperor. In 97, Nerva adopted M. Ulpius Trajanus, who was serving as governor of Upper Germany at the time. When Nerva died in January 98, Trajan succeeded him without opposition. Trajan went further than even Nerva had in restoring the image of a free republic. He refused to preside over capital trials against senators, observed the precedent of freedom of speech during senate meetings, and was away from Rome for such extended periods that the senate even regained some independent legislative abilities. In addition, he showed respect for the republican magisterial offices by only holding the Consulship four times during his nineteen-year reign, in contrast to the ten Consulships Domitian had held during his fifteen-year reign.

Hadrian succeeded Trajan as emperor. By far, his most important constitutional alteration was his creation of a bureaucratic apparatus, which included a fixed gradation of clearly defined offices, and a corresponding order of promotion. Many of the functions that had been outsourced in the past, such as tax collection, were now to be performed by the state. Hadrian adopted Antoninus Pius, made him his heir, and died shortly thereafter. No real changes to the constitution were made during the reign of Antoninus Pius. He made Marcus Aurelius his heir in 161, and died shortly thereafter. The most significant constitutional development that occurred during the reign of Marcus Aurelius was the revival of the republican principle of collegiality, as he made his brother, L. Aelius, his co-emperor. Marcus Aurelius ruled the western half of the empire, while his brother ruled the eastern half of the empire. In 169, Aelius died, and in 176, Marcus Aurelius made his son, L. Aurelius Commodus, his new co-emperor. This arrangement was revived more than a century later, when the emperor Diocletian established the Tetrarchy. In 180, Marcus Aurelius died, and Commodus became emperor. Commodus' tyranny revived the worst memories of the later Julian emperors, as he was more explicit than any of his predecessors in taking powers that he did not legally have, and in disregarding the constitution. He was killed in 192.

No further constitutional reforms were enacted during the Principate. The only development of any significance was the continuing slide towards monarchy, as the constitutional distinctions that had been set up by Augustus lost whatever meaning that they still had. Starting in 235, with the reign of the barbarian emperor Maximinus Thrax, the empire was put through a period of severe military, civil, and economic stress. The crisis arguably reached its height during the reign of Gallienus, from 260 to 268. The crisis ended with the accession of Diocletian in 284, and the abolishment of the Principate.

== See also ==
- Roman Kingdom
- Roman Republic
- Roman Empire
- Roman Law
- Plebeian Council
- Centuria
- Curia
- Roman consul
- Praetor
- Roman censor
- Quaestor
- Aedile
- Roman Dictator
- Master of the Horse
- Cursus honorum
- Byzantine Senate
- Pontifex Maximus
- Princeps senatus
- Interrex
- Promagistrate
- Acta Senatus
