= Democratic backsliding by country =

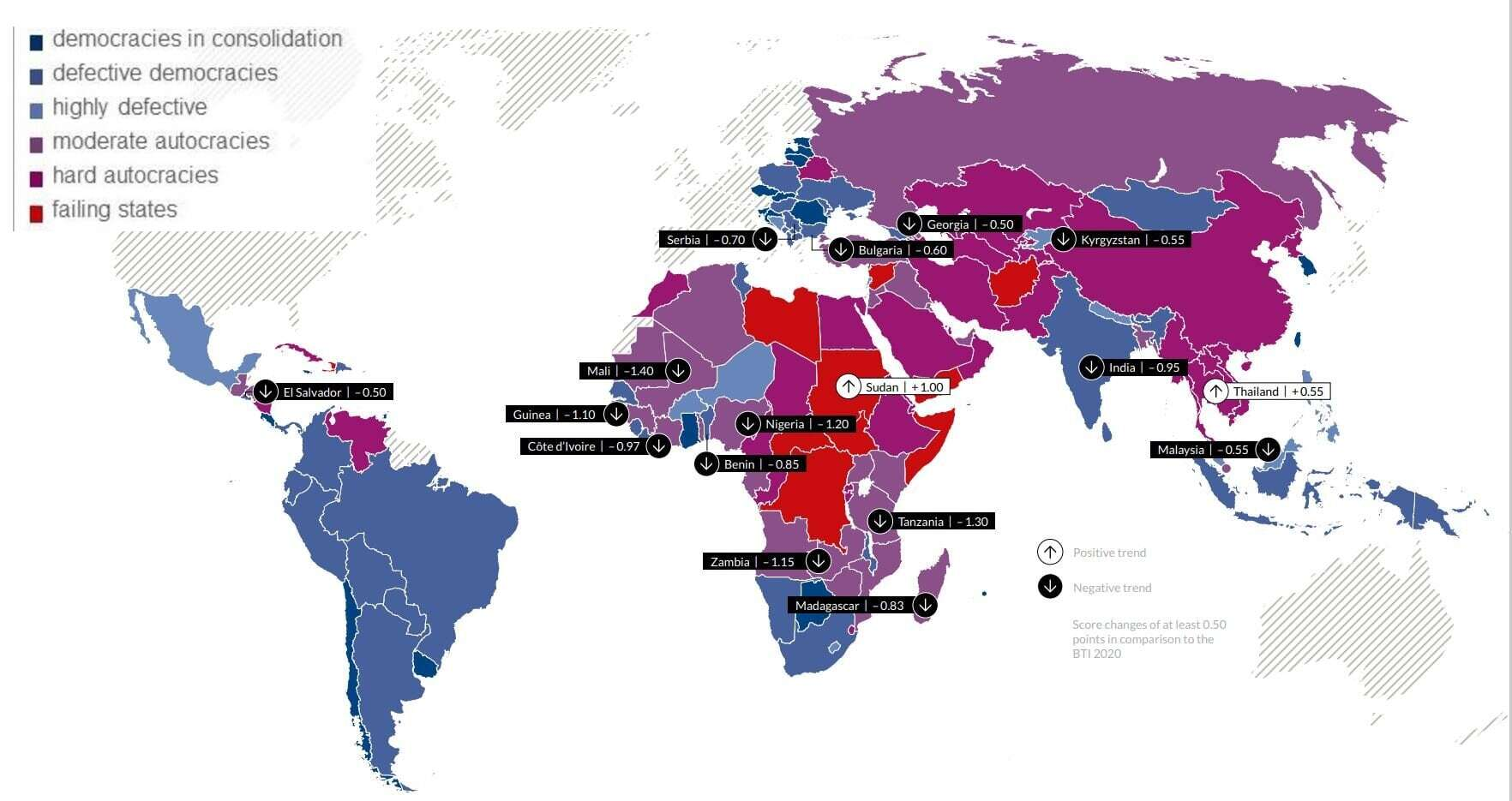
Global trend report Bertelsmann Transformation Index 2022

V-Dem Regimes of the World, 2026 Liberal Democracy Electoral Democracy Democratic Grey Zone Autocratic Grey Zone Electoral Autocracy Closed Autocracy

Democratic backsliding, also known as autocratization, is the decline in democratic qualities of a political regime, the opposite of democratization.

== Africa ==
Various countries in Africa have experienced democratic backsliding. Christopher Fomunyoh, a longtime Africa expert with the U.S.-based National Democratic Institute, said in 2020 testimony to the U.S. House of Representatives' Foreign Affairs Subcommittee on Africa, Global Health and Global Human Rights that there were strong democratic advances in Africa (especially West Africa) occurred between the late 1980s to the late 2010s, but that by 2019, democratic trends had reversed, with the result being "there are now fewer democracies in Africa" in 2021 than in 1991. Fomunyoh noted that in the first 20 years of the 21st century, about a dozen countries in sub-Saharan Africa weakened or abolished constitutional term limits for presidents; these moves weakened constitutionalism to benefit incumbents, removed one method of facilitating "the peaceful and orderly renewal of political leadership" and led to "excessive fragmentation and polarization of the polity, and, in some cases outright violence, and the further shrinking of political space."

== Americas ==
Various countries in the Americas have experienced democratic backsliding, including Argentina, Bolivia, Brazil, Ecuador, El Salvador, Guatemala, Honduras, Mexico, Nicaragua, Peru, the United States, Uruguay, and Venezuela.

== Historical countries ==
=== Roman Republic ===
The constitutional reforms of Augustus were a series of laws that were enacted by the Roman Emperor Augustus between 30 BC and 2 BC, which transformed the Constitution of the Roman Republic into the Constitution of the Roman Empire. The era during which these changes were made began when Augustus defeated Mark Antony and Cleopatra at the Battle of Actium in 31 BC, and ended when the Roman Senate granted Augustus the title "Pater Patriae" in 2 BC.

Historian Edward Watts lists the following causes as contributing to the devolution of the Roman Republic into an empire, on the theme of violating long-established norms of the republic:

- Abuse of political processes to personally punish opponents (by not approving a treaty) and obstructionist tactics that blocked reforms to deal with economic inequality, forcing proponents to use more aggressive political tactics.
- Soldiers becoming loyal to their commanders rather than the state, with their commanders seeking personal gains.
- Resorting to violence rather than political processes to solve disputes. The first political assassinations in centuries led to armed factions influencing votes and elections, and to mob violence and civil war.
- Complacency among people who found it difficult to imagine that a centuries-old republic could fail.
- Ability of Augustus, the first emperor, to prevent control of Rome by foreigners and corrupt politicians, and to prevent civil war through personal dominance.

Watts points out one of the main features of a functioning republican system is that loss of an election does not result in imprisonment or execution.

=== Weimar Republic ===
The causes of the devolution of the Weimar Republic into Nazi Germany are much debated, but several reasons are commonly cited:

- The way the government came to power: During the German Revolution of 1918–19, backers of a republic joined with military mutineers who refused to fight in the face of certain defeat in World War I. The stab-in-the-back myth counterfactually proposed that Germany could have continued fighting successfully had it not been for the surrender, but for that and other reasons, many Germans blamed the republicans for losing the war, and the new system of government did not have widespread support.
- Severe unemployment and economic problems caused by the Great Depression, war debts imposed by the Treaty of Versailles, and mismanagement that caused hyperinflation.
- Article 48 of the constitution, which gave the President the power to rule by emergency decree, a practice which was adopted as normal lawmaking broke down.
- The ability of the Parliament to remove the Chancellor without assigning a replacement, which left the office vacant in 1932.
- A practice of ignoring the Constitution if a law passed with a two-thirds majority, which was done in the passing of the Enabling Act of 1933, which abolished democracy.
- The lack of democratic tradition and experience in lawmaking.
- The actions of Heinrich Brüning in cutting social spending, and Paul von Hindenburg in appointing Adolf Hitler to be Chancellor.
- The Reichstag fire establishing a pretext for an anti-Communist crackdown and abolition of civil liberties, though it is disputed as to whether it was a false flag operation.

=== Empire of Japan ===
After World War I, a semi-democratic system emerged in the Empire of Japan as an experiment, with important steps including universal male suffrage in 1925 and the Rikken Seiyūkai and Rikken Minseito engaging in competitive elections. However, a partisan divide emerged between the parties, leading to many challenges such as the May 15 incident which assassinated Prime Minister Inukai Tsuyoshi, growing economic inequality and poverty, and increasing military influence in politics. These events culminated in the Imperial Japanese Army dissolving political parties in response to resentment of economic inequality, dragging Japan into the Second Sino-Japanese War in 1937.
