= Domina (TV series) =

2021 historical drama television series

- Genre: Historical drama
- Created by: Simon Burke
- Starring: Nadia Parkes; Tom Glynn-Carney; Enzo Cilenti; Peter Campion; Darrell D'Silva; Tom Forbes; Liam Garrigan; Oliver Huntingdon; Alexandra Moloney; Bailey Spalding; Melodie Wakivuamina; Liam Cunningham; Alex Lanipekun; Isabella Rossellini; Kasia Smutniak; Matthew McNulty; Ben Batt; Christine Bottomley; Colette Dalal Tchantcho; Claire Forlani; Finn Bennett; Earl Cave; Youssef Kerkour; Liah O'Prey; David Avery; Benjamin Isaac; Joelle; Alexandra Moen
- Composer: Samuel Sim
- Countries of origin: Italy; United Kingdom
- Original language: English
- No. of series: 2
- No. of episodes: 16

Production
- Executive producers: Simon Burke; Faye Dorn; Claire McCarthy; Patrick Spence; Marcus Wilson; Nils Hartmann; Sonia Rovai; Cameron Roach; Serena Thompson; Cristina Giubbetti; Lucy Bedford; David Evans; Muirinn Lane Kelly; Carmel Maloney
- Producers: John Phillips; Amy Rodriguez
- Production location: Rome
- Cinematography: Denson Baker; Ben Wheeler; Nicola Daley; Tim Fleming; Sergio Delgado; Emiliano Leurini
- Editors: Crispin Green; Isobel Stephenson; Mikka Leskinen; Benjamin Gerstein; Tom Henson-Webb
- Running time: 48–55 minutes
- Production companies: Fifty Fathoms (s. 1); Tiger Aspect; Cattleya; Sky Italia (s. 1); Sky Studios (s. 1); MGM+ Studios (s. 2)

Original release
- Network: Sky Atlantic (Italy) (s. 1); Sky Atlantic (UK) (s. 1); MGM+ (s. 2)
- Release: 14 May 2021 – 13 August 2023

Domina is an historical drama television series created and principally written by Simon Burke for Sky Atlantic (Italy) and Sky Atlantic (UK). Starring Kasia Smutniak as Livia Drusilla, it examines the power struggles of Ancient Rome from a female perspective. The series premiered on 14 May 2021 in Italy and the UK. MGM+ renewed Domina for a second season, which premiered on 9 July 2023 in the United States. In April 2024, the series was cancelled after two seasons.

== Premise ==
The series charts the life and rise of Livia Drusilla, the powerful wife of the Roman emperor Augustus Caesar.

In series 1, the simultaneous divorces of Livia and Augustus from their respective spouses in order to marry each other causes a political sex scandal.

All the political power is kept within the family of Augustus, Livia (his third and final wife), Agrippa (whom Augustus regards as his brother), and the daughters of Mark Antony (his son Iullus Antonius is sidelined), and Octavia (sister of Augustus). All their marriages are strategically arranged—never to a plebeian.

In series 2, power goes to Tiberius (son of Livia and stepson of Augustus) who marries his stepsister Julia the Elder (daughter of Augustus) upon his ascent. Augustus himself mandates this marriage after Agrippa's death.

== Cast and characters ==
=== Main ===
- Kasia Smutniak as Livia
  - Nadia Parkes as Young Livia (series 1)
  - Meadow Nobrega as Little Livia (recurring series 1)
- Matthew McNulty as Gaius
  - Tom Glynn-Carney as Young Gaius (series 1)
- Ben Batt as Agrippa
  - Oliver Huntingdon as Young Agrippa (series 1)
- Christine Bottomley as Scribonia
  - Bailey Spalding as Young Scribonia (series 1)
- Colette Dalal Tchantcho as Antigone (series 1)
  - Melodie Wakivuamina as Young Antigone (series 1)
  - Annelle Olaleye as Little Antigone (guest series 1)
- Claire Forlani as Octavia
  - Alexandra Moloney as Young Octavia (series 1)
- Enzo Cilenti as Tiberius Nero (series 1, featured series 2)
- Peter Campion as Libo (series 1)
- Darrell D'Silva as Piso
- Tom Forbes as Sextus (series 1)
- Liam Garrigan as Marcus Antonius (series 1)
- Liam Cunningham as Livius (series 1)
- Alex Lanipekun as Tycho
- Isabella Rossellini as Balbina (featured series 1)
- Finn Bennett as Marcellus (series 1)
- Youssef Kerkour as Maecenas (series 1)
  - Merch Husey as Young Maecenas (guest series 1)
- Liah O'Prey as Julia the Elder
- David Avery as Domitius (series 2)
- Benjamin Isaac as Tiberius (series 2)
  - Earl Cave as Young Tiberius (series 1)
- Joelle as Vipsania (series 2)
- Alexandra Moen as Turia (series 2)

=== Recurring ===
- Kevin Lettieri as Vinnius (series 1)
- Naike Anna Silipo as Prima (series 1)
- Roland Litrico as Thelus (series 1)
- Lex Shrapnel as Crassus (series 1)
- Anthony Barclay as Corvinus (series 1)
- Salvatore Palombi as Murena (series 1)
- Ewan Horrocks as Drusus
- Oliver Dench (series 1) and Joseph Ollman as Iullus
- Alaïs Lawson as Marcella
- Claudia Stecher as Fortunata (series 1)
- Pedro Leandro as Aprio (series 1)
- Yuliia Sobol as Gemina (series 2)
- Mia Jenkins as Ursa (series 2)
- Hannah Chinn as Antonia Major (series 2)
  - Emma Canning as Young Antonia Major (series 1)
- Isabelle Connolly as Antonia Minor "Antonina" (series 2)
  - Beau Gadsdon as Young Antonia Minor (series 1)
- Ethan Moorhouse as Vistilius (series 2)
- Elliot Barnes-Worrell as Vilbia (series 2)
- Nathan Welsh as Musca (series 2)
- Lilit Lesser as Aurelia (series 2)
- Fabrizio Romagnoli as Strabo (series 2)

=== Guests ===
- Alana Boden as Porcia

==== Series 1 ====
- Adelmo Fabo as Archias
- Daniel Caltagirone as Lepidus
- Brian McCardie as Cicero
- Melissa Di Cianni as Publilia
- Sergio Basile as Salassus
- Gerard Monaco as Dacius
- Emily Bevan as Herennia
- Greg Hicks as Asprenas
- Anthony Calf as Sabinus
- Giuditta Niccoli as Alfidia
- Nuvoletta Lucarelli as Hilarica
- Martina Galletta as Ursula
- Ettore Marrani as Musa
- Philip Arditti as Primus
- Dolores Carbonari as Valeria

==== Series 2 ====
- Alessandro Epifani as Aratus
- Edmund Wiseman as Siculus
- Edward Franklin as Elva
- Wolf Danny Homann as Ballomar
- Alex Walton as Gallus
- Jack Brett Anderson as Gracchus
- Eva Young as Aelina

== Episodes ==
Series	Episodes	Originally released	
Series	Episodes	First released	Last released
1	8	14 May 2021	15 May 2021
2	8	9 July 2023	13 August 2023

=== Series 1 (2021) ===
No. overall	No. in series	Title	Directed by	Written by	Original release date
1	1	"Fall"	Claire McCarthy	Simon Burke	14 May 2021
After the assassination of Julius Caesar, young noblewoman Livia Drusilla frees her enslaved friend Antigone so that she can join Livia as her companion. Livia's father, Livius, a republican, covertly gathers support from other senators, such as his friend Piso. Gaius Julius Caesar, adopted son of Julius Caesar, and his friend Agrippa meet Marcus Antonius and Marcus Aemilius Lepidus in secret. They agree to divide the empire between them and kill hundreds of senators and knights sympathetic to Caesar's murderers to raise money. Livia marries Tiberius Claudius Nero and meets Gaius at the wedding. The Proscriptions of the 2nd Triumvirate begin. Livius flees to Brutus and Cassius. He later kills himself after the republicans are defeated at Philippi. Nero is ignored by Gaius and the other triumvirs but after his name is posted on a later list, he and his family go on the run. Gaius marries Scribonia as part of a deal with Sextus Pompeius, who holds Sicily and is protecting refugees from the proscriptions. Nero makes for Sicily, but en route, the family is attacked by bandits. Livia kills their leader. Nero knocks Antigone down, and she is left for dead.
2	2	"Rise"	Claire McCarthy	Simon Burke	14 May 2021
In 39 BCE, Gaius and Marcus Antonius celebrate their truce with Sextus; Antonius is now married to Octavia, Gaius' sister. Livia, Nero and Tiberius have taken refuge with Sextus in Sicily but an amnesty as the result of the truce means the family can return to Rome. Livia finds herself pregnant again. In Rome, Livia and Nero move in with Livia's new guardian, Libo. Livia returns to her family home, looking for news of Antigone; she learns that Antigone has been re-enslaved and sold to a brothel. Livia tries to free Antigone from the House of Balbina but is thrown out. Scribonia, Gaius' wife, sends Livia and Nero an invitation to dinner. The dinner disappoints Nero; Livia makes it clear to Gaius that she is looking for a new husband. Livia is soon invited to visit Gaius alone and sets out the terms for their marriage. Agrippa fails to dissuade Livia from pursuing Gaius. Livia returns to the House of Balbina with a platoon of Gaius' soldiers and frees Antigone. With Antigone's help, Scribonia gives birth to Julia. Gaius divorces Scribonia a day later to marry Livia, who has now also divorced Nero. As Livia gives birth to her second son, Drusus, Antigone takes her revenge on Balbina.
3	3	"Family"	Claire McCarthy	Simon Burke	14 May 2021
Eleven years later, the civil war is over. Livia is pregnant again. On the holiday of Saturnalia, Gaius receives a delegation of senators at his villa, including Crassus (grandson of the more famous Crassus), Morena and Corvinus. He is reminded that the triumvirate's mandate from the senate expired years before and is given an ultimatum to step down, as his position is now illegal and unconstitutional. Agrippa advises his friend that he should do no such thing as they have made many enemies over the years and this would only strengthen their hand. Augustus tells his wife Livia he will not step down as the commander in chief. Gaius asks Agrippa to resign as second consul so they might offer Piso the position to placate the old republican faction in the senate. When Piso declines the offer of consul, Livia realises the way forward is simply to get the senate unwittingly to grant power to Gaius thus legitimising his position. In the senate, Gaius outmanoeuvres his detractors by seemingly ceding all power back to "the Senate and People of Rome", but when a large faction, led by Livia's former guardian Libo calls for his continued leadership, he is reinstated. At the tomb of the Claudii, Livia's waters break and she miscarries.
4	4	"Secrets"	David Evans	Simon Burke	15 May 2021
In 25BCE, Livia, pregnant once again, goes into labour, but the child is stillborn. On learning she cannot risk having any further children, she fears if Gaius was to learn that she could not sire him an heir, divorce would be an inevitability. Upon his return from campaigning in Hispania, Octavia proposes to Gaius that his daughter, Julia, be married to her son Marcellus. Having overheard the conversation, Julia seeks comfort in the arms of Iullus (Mark Antony's son who was on the losing side against "Gaius" Augustus). When Scribonia learns of Livia's inability to have any more children, she immediately informs Octavia, who in turn informs Gaius. Livia decides to divorce Gaius and leave Rome, but before doing so she visits Agrippa and offers him the opportunity of calling off the marriage between his daughter Vipsania and her son Tiberius, but he declines. Livia also lets it drop of the impending union between Julia and Marcellus, and her reservations about the match from a political perspective. Feeling both overlooked and disrespected by his friend, Agrippa confronts Gaius and the two men come to blows. Livia finds shelter at Piso's country estate, whilst Gaius finds himself increasingly isolated. Livia confides to Piso that she has been working towards a goal of restoring the republic, but now realises this will not happen during Gaius's tenure. She indicates that when Gaius dies, Drusus would be the natural candidate to complete her life's mission, but not without the assistance of Piso. The growing schism between Gaius and Agrippa throws Rome into yet another political crisis and Livia takes the opportunity to mediate between the two factions helping reinstate both their friendship and her marriage.
5	5	"Plague"	David Evans	Simon Burke	15 May 2021
In 23 BC, Rome is in the grip of plague. When Antigone tries to intervene in the treatment of a stricken Gaius, she is rebuffed by Octavia. With Caesar on his deathbed, the vultures start to circle. Livia plots to usurp Marcellus, who has been groomed to take over from Gaius. She favours Agrippa to step into the role of Princeps, but Marcellus, along with Crassus and Corvinus is plotting to kill Agrippa and disband the senate the moment Gaius dies. Antigone poisons Octavia and her doctor and once they are out of the way, attends to Gaius who is in a coma. The next morning when Crassus and a senatorial delegation arrive demanding news of Gaius and the appointment of a successor, Livia denies them an audience with her husband, fearing he may make Marcellus' succession official. She tells the senators Agrippa is the nominated successor and presents him with Caesar's ring of office. Once recovered, Agrippa returns the ring to Caesar, who is not pleased that his wishes were ignored by Livia. Antigone learns of the plot against Agrippa and Livia's sons from a spy in Octavia's household. She suggests to Livia they neutralise the threat Marcellus now increasingly poses by poisoning him and confesses to poisoning Nero, Livia's first husband, Octavia, her physician Musa and also Balbina, madam of the whorehouse where she was imprisoned.
6	6	"Nightshade"	Debs Paterson	Simon Burke	15 May 2021
Caesar Augustus announces to the family that he intends to adopt Marcellus as his son and heir in the autumn. Knowing of Marcellus' plans to kill her sons and send her into exile, Livia outwardly agrees that he is the future of Rome, but secretly accelerates plans with Antigone to poison him whilst he is taking a sojourn in Baiae using Deadly Nightshade. Crassus and Corvinus continue to cultivate their relationship with Marcellus, but also plan to assassinate him when he is no longer of use to them. When the money Marcellus' personal slave and lover Aprio has been receiving for supplying information to Livia's household is discovered, Octavia's suspicions are raised and she travels to Baiae in order to get answers. Before she arrives however, word reaches Livia from Tiberius that Aprio's deception has been uncovered and fearing that he will reveal all under torture, Livia brings forward plans for the assassination, offering Aprio safe passage, manumission and a new life if he mixes the poison in with Marcellus' food. Faced with a choice of freedom and riches, or torture and possible death, Aprio acquiesces, but poisons everyone. His duplicity is short lived however as he himself is double-crossed and killed by Tycho on his wife Antigone's orders. Antigone manages to make Livia and Julia vomit by administering sea-water, saving their lives.
7	7	"Treason"	David Evans	Simon Burke	15 May 2021
One year on, Livia receives a surprise visit from her cousin Porcia, who reveals her husband Marcus Primus, Governor of Macedonia, has been accused of treason by Marcus Licinius Crassus. Porcia indicates her husband was acting on the instructions of Caesar when he launched an offensive against the Danube tribes who had signed a peace treaty with the senate. Primus asks Marcus Messalla Corvinus, newly fallen out with Crassus, to defend him in court but Gaius also wants him gone lest he be implicated in public, so makes him an offer that would see him exiled, but with generous compensation. Primus declines, unaware of the fact that he is being used by Crassus and Corvinus in an attempt to once again destroy Caesar. Livia, loyalties torn between her cousin and husband, meets Porcia to tell her that there will be a trial but Primus must not under any circumstances reveal Caesar's involvement. Unbeknownst to Porcia, she and her litter are followed to Primus' safe house in the woods to the south of Rome and Agrippa is dispatched by Caesar to eliminate him soon after. Finding the safe house empty on arrival, Agrippa assumes he has missed his quarry, but he has been given the wrong location by Tycho at the behest of Livia. In court the next day Primus gives testimony that his orders to break the treaty came not from Gaius Caesar Augustus but Marcus Claudius Marcellus. The defeated conspirators decide a more hands-on approach to getting rid of Caesar is required, but are betrayed by Scribonia who has been the lover and confidante of Crassus. Caesar strikes first. In a final twist it is revealed that Porcia too was under the spell of Crassus.
8	8	"Happiness"	David Evans	Simon Burke	15 May 2021
Marcus Messalla Corvinus is on the run with a bounty on his head. Aprio's remains and diploma of freedom are discovered in Baiae and transported back to Rome alerting Octavia to the possibility that her son's murderer may have been silenced. Scribonia reveals to Octavia that Marcellus had planned to kill Livia's sons and then banish her into exile, therefore should be treated as the prime suspect along with medicine expert Antigone. At the tomb of the Claudii, Livia brings her sons in on her plans for Caesar's succession and the restoration of the Republic, and although Drusus is open to the possibility, Tiberius outright refuses, leading to Livia disowning him. Octavia decides to approach Gaius with her suspicions about Livia, hoping to blindside her when she is finally confronted but Iullus intercepts Livia at the tomb of her forefathers and brings her up to speed with the latest developments. Corvinus is captured and incarcerated in the Tullianum, he tries to reason with Agrippa and offers to reveal Marcellus' murderer but is garrotted before he can do so. Fearing what awaits them at the villa, Antigone and Tycho contemplate running away to Egypt but eventually decide to accompany Livia back home to meet their fate. When confronted by Octavia, Livia denies everything. Despite identifying Livia's means, motive and opportunity, their inability to provide any hard evidence or witnesses see Octavia and Scribonia outmanoeuvred once more.

=== Series 2 (2023) ===
No. overall	No. in series	Title	Directed by	Written by	Original release date
9	1	"Conspiracy"	David Evans	Simon Burke	9 July 2023
In 19 BC, Augustus and Livia have been away for three years in the Eastern provinces. On their return they find Rome in the grip of famine and on the brink of revolt. Unrecognised, Gaius drops into a whorehouse to eavesdrop on what the plebs are saying, only to inadvertently become involved in a brawl. Livia is separated in the melee and finds herself imprisoned by the nightwatch and almost sold into slavery, saved only by the timely intervention of Gnaius Calpurnius Piso. They rescue a fellow prisoner, Ursa, who leads them to a stockpile of hidden grain. The grain prefects appointed by Gaius have been in league with their former army comrade and Octavia's new son-in-law, Domitius, withholding grain in order to manipulate the market price. As the net tightens, Domitius covers his tracks, but Livia remains suspicious about him. Meanwhile Drusus is in love with his German concubine Gemina and openly co-habiting with her much to the consternation of Octavia whose daughter he is betrothed to. With Antigone deceased, Tycho returns to the service of Livia despite being a freedman with his own estate. He is given the task of getting rid of Gemina and has her sold into slavery. Gaius summons Tiberius, Drusus, Iullus and Domitius, and indicates upon his death one of them will inherit his mantle and therefore Rome and the empire.
10	2	"Wedding"	David Evans	Simon Burke	9 July 2023
A year later the wedding of Drusus to Octavia's youngest daughter Antonina approaches. Octavia, under the impression that her deceased son Marcellus has paid them a visit from the underworld to express his displeasure at the forthcoming union, convinces Gaius to postpone the wedding indefinitely. Unable to control his own family and thus appearing weak politically, Gaius orders his sister to send his niece to become a priestess at the Temple of Vesta as an ultimatum, hoping she might reconsider the marriage. Octavia flatly refuses to relent and digs in her heels. Livia learning of this new development from Tycho realises she has to act fast, as once an initiate has taken the holy vows, they cannot be rescinded. She pays Octavia a visit at her country estate in the Sabine Hills and delivers an ultimatum, one that Octavia cannot ignore. Meanwhile, Gemina, now in the possession of Gaius, has been taking counsel from Scribonia.
11	3	"Betrayal"	David Evans	Simon Burke	16 July 2023
Two months later, Gemina now pregnant with Gaius' child, is spotted by Livia, travelling in a litter. She despatches Tycho to ascertain who her new owner is. When Gemina reveals the pregnancy to Gaius he decides the time has come to end his trysts with her and remove her from Rome. He instructs Agrippa to find her a husband, one that will not ask too many questions. Scribonia suggests to Gemina that if Gaius was a widower her problems would be solved. The news of Gaius infidelity and Scribonia's involvement shock Livia and make her realise more than ever that one wrong move could spell the end for her. Summoned by Gemina, Livia meets with her without her guards and the two become involved in a fight to the death. When Gaius and Agrippa discover Gemina's body, Gaius puts a price on the perpetrator's head, but only Agrippa notices Livia's gold bracelet at the scene of the crime. Returning the bracelet to Livia, Agrippa confesses his unrequited love for her and offers her a deal for his silence. When Livia confesses all to Gaius, she suggests they are now even, but Gaius decides to quietly force her into exile. When her sons, now serving with the legions in Germania learn of this, they conclude they are only safe as long as Agrippa remains alive.
12	4	"Exile"	Sallie Aprahamian	Simon Burke	23 July 2023
Another year has passed, Lucius Domitius Ahenobarbus has been elected consul, but Iullus and Livia's two sons see his ascendency as a threat and make a pact to form a triumvirate in the event of succession. Marcella learns of Julia's years-long affair and reports this to Gaius, oblivious of the fact that the other party is her stepbrother and husband Iullus. Gaius summons Tiberius, Drusus, Iullus and Domitius and offers a bounty for the head of Julia's lover. Agrippa, incensed at the news of his wife's infidelity, tries to commit prolicide, but is brought to his senses by Octavia. Livia, still in exile, receives a visit from Vilbia, a Roman businessman, at Piso's country estate. A bachelor, he offers his silence about her sons' various misdeeds in return for a betrothal to one of the aristocratic families of Rome. On the run and in fear for her life, Julia turns to Livia for help. Octavia fearing for the life of her stepson, swallows her pride and also approaches Livia. With the likelihood that Julia's personal slaves will give up Iullus's name under torture, Livia convinces Julia to return to Rome and confess. When pressed by Agrippa, she accuses Vilbia of cuckolding him. By murdering him, Agrippa makes an enemy of his brother. Gaius reconciles with Livia and she returns to the imperial palace on the Palatine Hill.
13	5	"Sacrilege"	Sallie Aprahamian	Rachel Paterson	30 July 2023
In 16BC, In the Teutoberg forests of Western Germania Gaius and Drusus are once again on campaign with the Army of the Rhine and Tiberius joins them. Livia wants to take a look at Gaius' will in his absence, but it is held in the vaults of the Temple of Vesta. Livia engineers it so that her cousin Porcia and one of the temple's priestesses become lovers. Tycho then uses the information to try to blackmail the vestal into providing the will. When the young vestal informs the high priestess Turia of the plot, it is decided they will play along in order to unmask the perpetrators. Having examined the will, Livia is horrified to discover Gaius names his heirs as none other than his adopted sons of Agrippa and Domitius as executor. Turia summons Livia to the Temple of Vesta and confronts her. Familiar with Livia's duplicitous nature, Turia demands a high price for her silence. Although Livia agrees to her terms, she knows that Turia will always have a hold over her so must be dealt with even though her person is sacrosanct. She devises a method of elimination without touching or harming Turia. When Gaius tasks Drusus with the conquest of all Germania so that it becomes a new Roman province, Tiberius becomes suspicious of Gaius' motives and sends word to his mother for counsel.
14	6	"Freedom"	Sallie Aprahamian	Simon Burke	6 August 2023
In 12BC Agrippa passes away from natural causes whilst Julia is giving birth to his third son. Imperial politics and machinations soon begin to determine who, if anyone, Julia will now be married to by Gaius. Julia wishes never to marry again, but Tiberius deduces he may be the one drawing the short straw, so decides to escape Rome with his wife Vipsania at the first opportunity. Domitius sees an opportunity to get closer to power though marriage, but when warned off by Livia, starts to delve into her past and plots her demise with the assistance of Vilbias brother Musca. Tracked down by Drusus, Tiberius reluctantly returns home and accepts his fate. When Drusus leaves once again for the front in Germania he sends Tiberius a coded message indicating he is willing to commit his legions to overthrowing Gaius if Tiberius will do the same with his Balkan contingent. Tipped off by Drusus' wife Antonina of this new development, Livia instructs Tiberius to write a response declining. Unknown to all parties, Gaius has a spy in Drusus' camp who has given him a copy of the coded missive, although he does not have the cipher to decode it. That evening Tiberius tries to smother Livia whilst she is sleeping only to be thwarted by Tycho.
15	7	"Curse"	David Evans	Simon Burke	13 August 2023
11BC and Drusus returns from Germania to Rome for his brother's wedding to Julia. With both bride and groom still reluctant to join in matrimony, a contract is drawn up confirming it is a marriage of political convenience. On her way back to Rome from Piso's country estate Livia is ambushed by Musca and his men. Livia's absence at the wedding arouses concern and a cohort is dispatched to look for her. At the wedding celebrations Gaius challenges Drusus to a game of dice, occupying his stepson long enough to have his cipher stolen so that he can decode Drusus' private correspondence of which he has been receiving copies. Also, Gracchus and Julia are caught copulating. Domitius, under the impression that Livia's assassination has been successful has all traces linking him with the ambush purged. His look of shock when she turns up alive and well does not go unnoticed. Ailing on her deathbed, Octavia asks Gaius to promise that he will take the life of one of Livia's sons as vengeance for the murder of Marcellus.
16	8	"Control"	David Evans	Simon Burke	13 August 2023
In 9BC, having finally deciphered Drusus' letters, Gaius drops a hint to Livia that he knows of the plot to restore the republic. Meanwhile, the campaign in Germania seems to be about to bear fruit for Drusus. He declines a recall order from Gaius, prompting Livia to despatch Tiberius to the frontline to dissuade him from his challenge to Gaius' authority. Eager to sign a treaty with the Cherusci before being forced back to Rome, Drusus is drawn into a trap and badly wounded. Blind and with infected wounds, Drusus asks Tiberius to take his life before his condition worsens. Unable to bring himself to do so, it is left to Tycho to give Drusus a compassionate death. Back in Rome, Iullus and Julia drown Marcella, and her death, explained away as suicide, removes another thorn from Livia's side. However, the news of the death of her own son Drusus leaves Livia reeling and convinced that the many years of behind-the-scenes plotting, secrecy and bloodletting have been for nought. Tiberius thinks that Vestilius had a hand in the death of Drusus. Suspecting Tiberillus to not be his son, Tiberius kills the infant.

== Production ==
The series was written by Simon Burke, and the lead director was Australian filmmaker Claire McCarthy. Filming for Domina resumed at the Cinecittà studios in Rome in July 2020 following delays from the initial start in 2019 due to the COVID-19 pandemic. The show's title comes from the female version of 'Dominus', the Ancient Roman title for sovereignty, and from which the word 'dominate' originates. As pointed out by Nicola Maccanico (executive vice president of programming, Sky Italia), Domina is an international production with strong Italian roots. The costumes were designed by Gabriella Pescucci, and the production design was by Luca Tranchino.

In February 2022, Epix (later renamed MGM+) renewed the show for a second series.

In April 2024, it was reported that the series had been canceled after two series.

== Broadcast ==
The series was released in its entirety on 14 May 2021 on Sky Box Sets and NOW in Italy and the UK. It premiered on television the same day on Sky Atlantic (Italy) and Sky Atlantic (UK).

In the United States, the series premiered on 6 June 2021 on Epix. In Australia, the series is streamed on the service Stan.

The second series premiered on 9 July 2023 on MGM+ in the US, on 10 July in Australia, and on 8 September in Italy and the UK.

== Reception ==
The series has received mostly positive reviews from critics. On Rotten Tomatoes, the series holds an approval rating of 82% based on 11 reviews, with an average score of 6.7/10. Suzi Feay in the Financial Times dubbed the series "Game of Romans". Historian Tom Holland in The Times agreed that "The echoes of Game of Thrones in the first two episodes are strong, and surely deliberate...the rest of the series approximates more closely to a political thriller". Holland praised the series, saying, "the meat of the show is so enjoyably done that the odd anachronism hardly matters. The 20s BC, sandwiched between the suicides of Antony and Cleopatra and the maturity of Augustus, have never before been the subject of popular drama, but Domina demonstrates to brilliant effect how unjustly neglected they have been... Part of the fun of the series is seeing characters who became significant players in the later decades of Augustus's life as teenagers".

Both The Telegraph and The Standard gave the opening episode three stars out of five.
