= Coniuratio Italiae =

Historical event in the final war of the Roman Republic (31 BCE)

The Oath of Italy (Coniuratio Italiae) was an historical event that took place in 32 BC, by which Italy swore allegiance to Octavian Caesar in the Final war of the Roman Republic against Cleopatra and Mark Antony. Augustus himself retells the facts in the Res Gestae Divi Augusti: "The whole of Italy voluntarily took oath of allegiance to me and demanded me as its leader in the war in which I was victorious at Actium." Following the event, the Western provinces of Sicily, Sardinia, Spain and Gaul also sided with Augustus, and the same happened with the Eastern provinces and Egypt following the conflict. The Oath of Italy was foundational for the birth of the Roman Empire in a similar way that the Oath of Brutus was declared to overthrow the Roman Kingdom, as both were used as an expression of the will of the people.

== See also ==
- Constitutional reforms of Augustus
