= Coin collection of the University of Freiburg =

The coin collection of the Albert-Ludwigs-University of Freiburg comprises over 14,000 coins, looked after by the Department of Ancient History. The collection places a strong emphasis on coins from the Roman Principate and Late Antiquity, with approximately 12,000 specimens, making it one of the largest ancient coin collections at any German university.

== History ==
The coin collection was assembled by Ministerialrat Heinrich Wefels between 1900 and 1926. A passionate scholar of ancient numismatics, Wefels also published articles on the subject. After his death in 1931, both the coin collection and his specialised numismatic library were transferred to the Archbishop’s Ordinariate of Freiburg. The lawyer and numismatist Josef Holler later undertook the task of organising and systematizing the collection, ensuring its proper documentation. Following an expert assessment by the ancient historian Konrad Kraft, then a supernumerary professor in Frankfurt am Main, the collection was offered for sale to the University of Freiburg. With financial support from federal and state authorities, the university acquired both the coin collection and numismatic library in 1961 for DM 30,000, during the professorship of Herbert Nesselhauf.

In 1967, assistant professor Marieluise Deißmann-Merten assumed responsibility for the collection, acting as supervisor and primary contact person. Under her guidance, the collection underwent reorganisation, inventorying, and preparation for university teaching.

The Department of Ancient History began the gradual online publication of the collection in 1999. Supported by the Federal Ministry of Education and Research, a digitisation project was initiated in collaboration with the Network of University Coin Collections in Germany (NUMiD-network). Between 2017 and 2020, this effort culminated in the creation of a digital, interactive coin catalogue for the University of Freiburg’s collection. The project also received funding from the student council of the University of Freiburg and the State Initiative for Small Subjects in Baden-Württemberg. As part of the digitisation process, data was also integrated into international numismatic databases, including Coinage of the Roman Republic Online (CRRO) and Online Coins of the Roman Empire (OCRE).

Since 2017, the University of Freiburg has been a member of the numismatic network of Baden-Württemberg.

== Use of the collection ==
The collection has frequently been showcased to the public, including an exhibition in the Archaeological Collection of the Institute of Classical Archaeology. In 1999, to mark the introduction of the euro, the Freiburg University Library organised an exhibition on monetary unions. Additionally, since 2011, 26 coins from the collection have been on permanent loan to the Uniseum Freiburg. These coins, dating from the late Roman Republic and early Principate, illustrate how Augustus used coinage as a medium for political messaging in antiquity.

The collection also plays a central role in teaching at the Department of Ancient History. Its holdings are publicly accessible via an interactive coin catalogue (CCOC).

== Publications ==
=== Academic publications ===
Selected coins from the University of Freiburg’s collection are examined in the following publications:

- Ehling, Kay (2001). Die Münzprägung der mysischen Stadt Germe in der römischen Kaiserzeit (= Asia Minor Studien 42), Bonn.
- Meyer, Eckhard (1987/88). "Die Bronzeprägung von Laodikeia in Syrien 194–217". Jahrbuch für Numismatik und Geldgeschichte (37/38): 57–92.
- Meyer, Eckhard (1989). "Zwei unedierte severische Münzen aus Laodicea ad mare und Milet". Quaderni ticinesi di numismatica e antichità classiche (18): 269–278.
- Meyer-Zwiffelhoffer, Eckhard (1994). "Die Münzprägung von Paltos in Syrien". Jahrbuch für Numismatik und Geldgeschichte (44): 91–111.
- Ziegler, Ruprecht (1993). Kaiser, Heer und städtisches Geld. Untersuchungen zur Münzprägung von Anazarbos und anderer ostkilikischer Städte (= Ergänzungsbände Tituli Asiae Minoris 16), Vienna.

=== Publications about the collection ===
- Gerenstein, Rimma (2011). "Die Zeitung der Antike". uni’leben. Die Zeitung der Albert-Ludwigs-Universität Freiburg (6): 4.
- Haymann, Florian (2011). "Numismatik am Seminar für Alte Geschichte Freiburg i. Br.". Collegium Beatus Rhenanus (14): 3.
- Kastner, Paul Georg (1979). "Aus der Münzsammlung des Seminars für Alte Geschichte an der Universität Freiburg". Freiburger Universitätsblätter (65): 73–77.
- Opitz, Eva (2018). "Große Herrscher – ganz klein". uni’leben. Die Zeitung der Albert-Ludwigs-Universität Freiburg (2): 9.
- Wirbelauer, Eckhard (1999). "Währungsunion: Lernen von den Römern. Die Münzsammlung des Seminars für Alte Geschichte präsentiert Schätze der Universität". Freiburger Uni-Magazin (3): 10–11.
