= Principate =

First period of the Roman Empire (27 BC – AD 284)

The Principate was the early period of the Roman Empire, beginning with the reign of Augustus as the first Roman emperor in 27 BC and conventionally lasting until the late third century, often linked to the Crisis of the Third Century. The Principate as a term is inspired by the position of princeps senatus that had existed during the previous Roman Republic. Augustus refashioned the concept of a princeps ('leading citizen' or 'first citizen') that had previously applied to Roman nobility, but now became a title for the sole ruler of Rome. Later Roman emperors also contributed in defining the role of the princeps in Roman society.

Proposed in the 19th-century by the German scholar Theodor Mommsen, he viewed the Principate as a constitutional system in which imperial authority was formally embedded within Republican institutions before its rupture into the Dominate. Since the early 20th century, scholars have increasingly rejected this view, calling the Principate a variant of monarchy and putting more emphasis on the Augustan Principate over the Dominate. Principate continues to be used as a periodisation scheme of Roman rule.

== Terminology ==
During the Republican era, the princeps senatus was the most influential member of the Roman Senate. It was abolished by Sulla and revived by Augustus in 28 BC. Over time, Augustus evolved the position, as princeps ('leading citizen' or 'first citizen'), so that this, the "first or chief man in the state", had hierarchy over other republican positions.

The historian Jochen Bleicken credits Theodor Mommsen with introducing the constitutional concepts of "Principate" and "Dominate" as a framework for periodising Roman imperial history. Mommsen regarded the "Principate" as a distinctive feature of Roman political history and introduced the additional concept of diarchy to describe the early imperial system, in which power was formally shared between Augustus, as princeps, and the Senate from 27 BC. Mommsen considered the "Principate" to be an extension of the republic until its rupture in the 3rd century, when it became the Dominate during the reign of Diocletian.

Mommsen’s interpretation was later criticised for over-emphasising the role of law. Historians following Ronald Syme now view the "Principate" as a variant of monarchy. There has been a greater emphasis on an "Augustan Principate" that evolved over time, than on the "Dominate" as a new constitution. Scholars also no longer consider diarchy a useful concept in the study of Roman history. The move away from the legal and constitutional framework of Mommsen first occurred in the 1910–1930s by placing more value on the networks of people, the 1960s to mid-1980s with a view of how rulers interact with communities, and now with broader views shaped by the social and political sciences. In 21st-century scholarship, “Augustan Age” is widely used to frame the period associated with the development of the "Augustan Principate".

The "Principate" continues to be used as a periodisation scheme for the first phase of the Roman Empire, from Augustus until the conclusion of the Crisis of the Third Century. However, Bleicken considers it unsuitable for this purpose, due to the flawed legal basis and the misunderstanding it creates, such as viewing the earlier imperial period as having more freedom.

== Augustan Age ==
=== Background ===
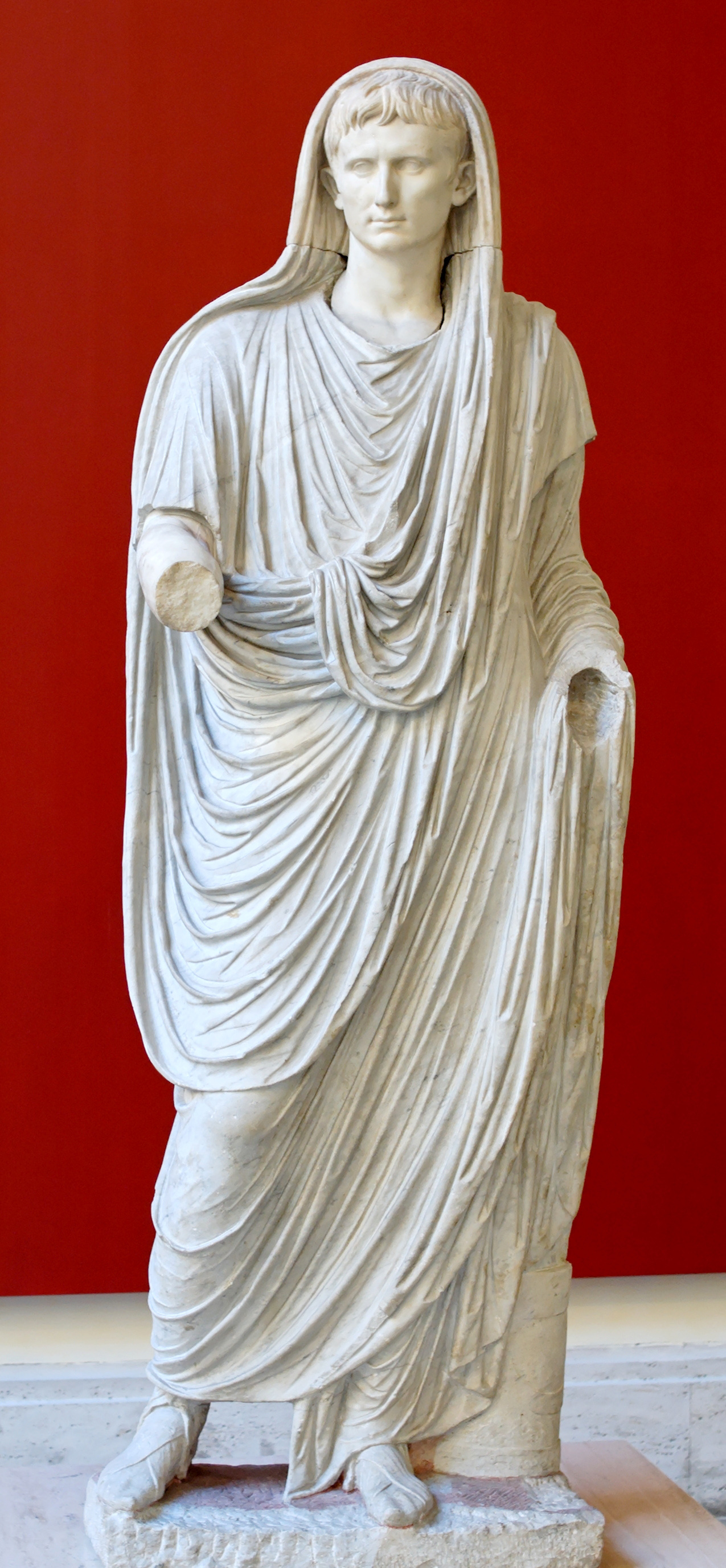
Augustus depicted as pontifex maximus in the Via Labicana Augustus statue, now in the National Museum of Rome, Italy

After the Battle of Actium and the defeat of Antony and Cleopatra, Octavian was in a position to rule the entire Roman Republic and he achieved this through incremental power gains. He courted the Senate and the people while upholding the republican traditions of Rome, maintaining the carefully curated appearance that he was not aspiring to dictatorship or monarchy. The term princeps was previously applied to members of the Roman nobility who distinguished themselves in service to the Republic, and Octavian would embrace this title as part of his cultivated image as a restorer of the Republic.

Historians Werner Eck and Sarolta Takács explain the authority Augustus created based on three factors:

"The sum of his power derived first of all from various powers of office delegated to him by the Senate and people, secondly from his immense private fortune, and thirdly from numerous patron-client relationships he established with individuals and groups throughout the Empire. All of them taken together formed the basis of his auctoritas, which he himself emphasized as the foundation of his political actions."

Augustus began his reign holding the office and authority of a consul, but in a later settlement with the Senate he acquired the powers of the tribune of the plebs, the censor, and finally became pontifex maximus as well.

=== Development of the Augustan Principate ===
In August 29 BC Octavian was awarded with three triumphs in Rome for his respective victories in Illyria, Greece, and Egypt. Octavian and Agrippa were elected as the consuls for 28 BC, granted certain powers of the censor but not with the office itself, namely for the duty of conducting Rome’s census.

On 13 January 27 BC, Octavian made a show of returning full power to the Senate and relinquishing his control of the Roman provinces and their armies. Octavian was no longer in direct control of the provinces and their armies, but he retained the loyalty of active duty soldiers and veterans alike. The Senate proposed to Octavian, the victor of Rome’s civil wars, that he once again assume command of the provinces. The Senate’s proposal was a ratification of Octavian’s extra-constitutional power. Feigning reluctance, on 16 January 27 BC he accepted a ten-year responsibility of overseeing provinces that were considered chaotic. Moreover, command of these provinces provided Octavian with control over the majority of Rome’s legions. The Senate’s control over some of the Roman provinces helped maintain a republican facade for the autocratic principate.

While Octavian acted as consul in Rome, he dispatched senators to the provinces under his command as his representatives to manage provincial affairs and ensure that his orders were carried out. The provinces not under Octavian’s control were overseen by governors chosen by the Senate: however, by virtue of his imperium maius, the later reigning Augustus issued instructions and edicts not only to his own legates but also to independent proconsuls governing public provinces that were nominally under senatorial control.

On 16 January 27 BC, the Senate gave Octavian the new title of augustus. It was a title of religious authority rather than a political one, and it indicated that Octavian now approached divinity. The Senate also confirmed his position as princeps senatus, the member of the Senate with the highest precedence. By 23 BC, some of the un-republican implications were becoming apparent concerning the settlement of 27 BC. Around this time and after dealing with a severe illness, the emperor improved and soon afterwards on 1 July 23 BC Augustus gave up his consulship. Although Augustus had resigned as consul, he desired to retain his consular imperium not just in his provinces but throughout the empire. This and related matters led to a second compromise between him and the Senate.

The related matter is what became known as the "Marcus Primus affair". It was scandalous, as it was considered a breach of the Senate’s prerogative under the settlement of 27 BC. The second settlement was completed in part to allay confusion and formalise Augustus’s legal authority to intervene in senatorial provinces. The Senate granted Augustus a form of general imperium proconsulare that applied throughout the empire, not solely to his provinces. Moreover, the Senate augmented Augustus’s proconsular imperium into imperium proconsulare maius. This form of proconsular imperium was applicable throughout the empire and in effect gave Augustus constitutional power superior to all other proconsuls. During the second settlement, Augustus was also granted the power of a tribune (tribunicia potestas) for life, though not the official title of tribune. This power allowed him to convene the Senate and people at will and lay business before them, to veto the actions of either the Assembly or the Senate, to preside over elections, and to speak first at any meeting.

The Senate would eventually vote on Augustus’s imperium proconsulare maius as not lapsing when he was inside the city walls. All armed forces in the city had formerly been under the control of the urban praetors and consuls, but this situation now placed them under the sole authority of Augustus. On 6 March 12 BC, after the death of Lepidus who held the position of pontifex maximus, Augustus acquired this position of high priesthood in the College of Pontiffs, the most eminent role in the Roman religion. Beginning with Augustus, the title of pontifex maximus was retained solely by Roman emperors until the fall of the Western Roman Empire in AD 476, after which it was adopted by the papacy in Rome.

=== Patronage and the military ===
Patronage, an exchange relationship between two people of "unequal status and resources", is a notable institution in ancient Rome's history. (Note: Scholars do not have a universal consensus yet on the explanatory power of this concept.) During the Principate, scholars focus on its relationship to an orderly society and its role between the government and people. Civic patronage in particular may have played an important role in the Romanisation of the West. Augustus, described as the "ultimate source of patronage", pursued this because it strengthened the empire with loyalty and a common identity.

Augustus' financial power was unrivaled and that underpinned his patronage. The conquest of Ptolemaic Egypt relieved his financial debts during the civil wars, and then he controlled Roman Egypt directly, forbidding Roman senators to travel there, and kept tight control over its highly lucrative taxation. Augustus was given the title pater patriae ('father of the country'), which was then inscribed in various places in Rome such as the Senate chambers in the Forum Romanum. In Roman culture, the father as head of the household, was highly regarded and it appears Augustus preferred the title pater than patronus.

Augustus' rise to power and the security of his reign was built on the loyalty of the military, which was achieved in several deliberate ways. Augustus split management of the provinces with the Senate, and it was explained that he was to handle the more troublesome provinces. Even though the Senate initially controlled some legions, Augustus ended up with complete control over the army. Augustus would ultimately institutionalise command of the military into the Principate.

== Other developments ==
Tiberius, like Augustus, also acquired his powers piecemeal, and was proud to emphasize his place as first citizen: "a good and healthful princeps, whom you have invested with such great discretionary power, ought to be the servant of the Senate, and often of the whole citizen body". Thereafter, however, the role of princeps became more institutionalized: as Cassius Dio puts it, Caligula "took in one day all the honours which Augustus had with difficulty been induced to accept".

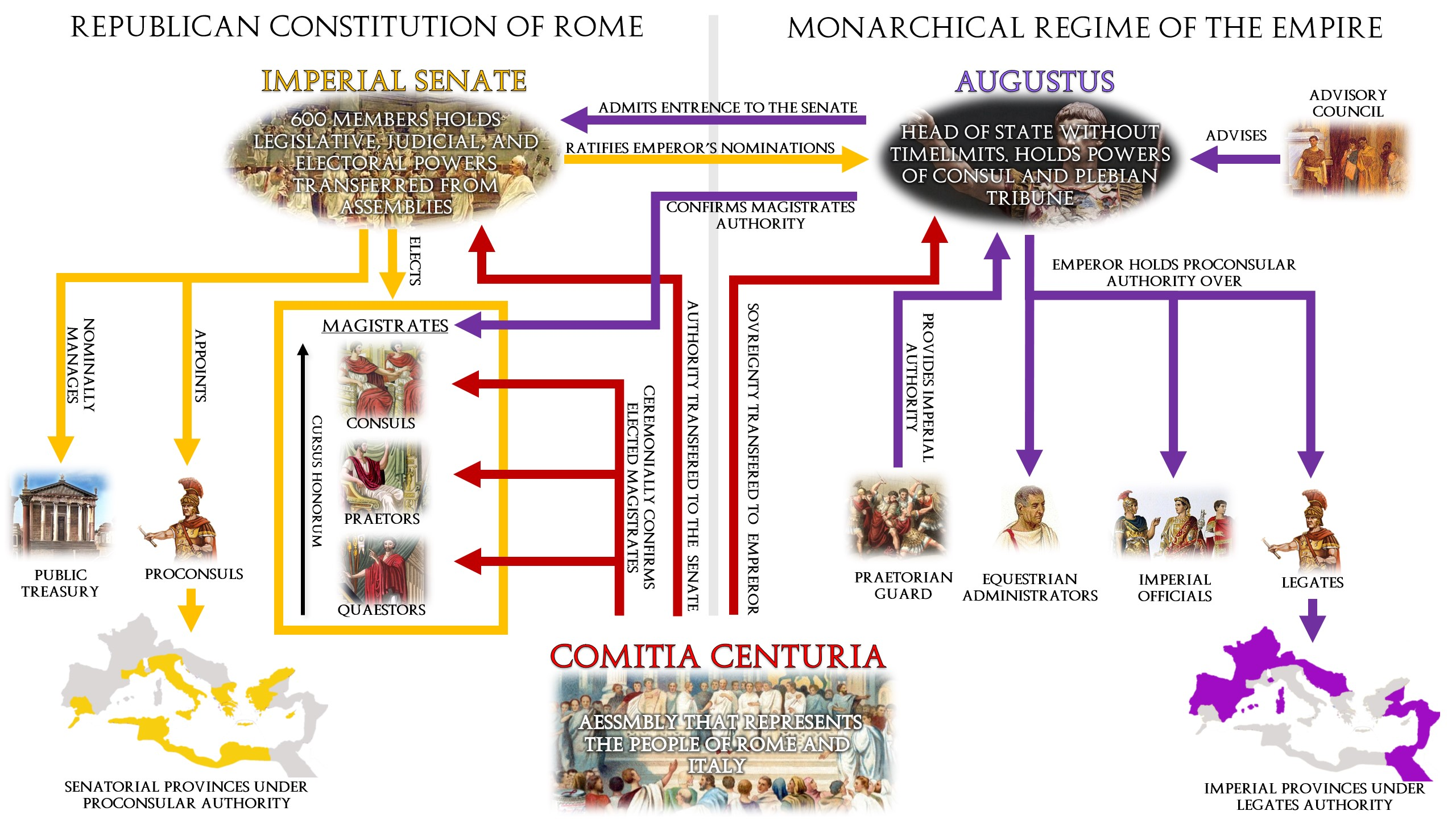
Principate under Augustus

Nevertheless, under this "Principate stricto sensu", the political reality of autocratic rule by the Emperor was still scrupulously masked by forms and conventions of oligarchic self-rule inherited from the political period of the 'uncrowned' Roman Republic (509 BC–27 BC) under the motto Senatus Populusque Romanus ("The Senate and people of Rome") or SPQR. Initially, the theory implied the 'first citizen' had to earn his extraordinary position (de facto evolving to nearly absolute monarchy) by merit in the style that Augustus himself had gained the position of auctoritas.

Imperial propaganda developed a paternalistic ideology, presenting the princeps as the very incarnation of all virtues attributed to the ideal ruler (much like a Greek tyrannos earlier), such as clemency and justice, and military leadership, obliging the princeps to play this designated role within Roman society, as his political insurance as well as a moral duty. What specifically was expected of the princeps seems to have varied according to the times, and the observers: Tiberius, who amassed a huge surplus for the city of Rome, was criticized as a miser, while his successor Caligula was criticized for his lavish spending on games and spectacles.

Generally speaking, it was expected of the Emperor to be generous but not frivolous, not just as a good ruler but also with his personal fortune (as in the proverbial "bread and circuses" – panem et circenses) providing occasional public games, gladiators, chariot races and artistic shows. Large distributions of food for the public and charitable institutions also served as popularity boosters, while the construction of public works provided paid employment for the poor.

With the fall of the Julio-Claudian dynasty in AD 68, the principate became more formalized under the Emperor Vespasian from AD 69 onwards. The position of princeps became a distinct entity within the broader – formally still republican – Roman constitution. While many of the same cultural and political expectations remained, the civilian aspect of the Augustan ideal of the princeps gradually gave way to the military role of the imperator. That there was no explicit outline in Roman law for the succession of Roman emperors or who could become princeps, which became starkly clear with the civil war that followed the end of the Julio-Claudian dynasty. Afterwards, Vespasian established a legal basis for his succession by listing the offices and powers he inherited from Augustus, Tiberius, and Claudius in the lex quae dicitur de imperio Vespasiani. Rule was no longer a position (even notionally) extended on the basis of merit, or auctoritas, but on a firmer basis, allowing Vespasian and future emperors to designate their own heir without those heirs having to earn the position through years of success and public favor.

Under the Antonine dynasty, it was standard for the Emperor to appoint a successful and politically promising individual as his successor. Though later scholars would often cite this as an ideal system in which succession to the position of princeps was determined on the basis of ability rather than heredity, that this was the intention of the emperors themselves has generally been rejected by modern scholarship. This period saw several firsts for the imperial office, including the first recognised period of rule by two emperors during the co-rule of Marcus Aurelius and Lucius Verus from their accession in 161 AD until the latter's death in 169 AD, and the succession of Commodus marking the first transfer of power to a son born to a sitting emperor. Often ranked amongst the worst Roman emperors, Commodus's 12-year reign was followed by a civil war between rival generals and the final dynasty of the Principate, the Severan dynasty.

== Bibliography ==
- Bleicken, Jochen (1978). Prinzipat und Dominat : Gedanken zur Periodisierung d. röm. Kaiserzeit. Internet Archive. Wiesbaden : Steiner. ISBN 978-3-515-02876-9.
- Bleicken, Jochen (2016). Augustus: the biography. Translated by Bell, Anthea. London: Penguin Books. ISBN 978-0-14-029482-8.
- Bowersock, G. W. (1990). "The Pontificate of Augustus". In Raaflaub, Kurt A.; Toher, Mark (eds.). Between Republic and Empire: Interpretations of Augustus and his Principate. Berkeley: University of California Press. pp. 380–394. ISBN 978-0-520-08447-6.
- Bringmann, Klaus (2007) [2002]. A History of the Roman Republic. Translated by Smyth, W. J. Cambridge: Polity. ISBN 978-0-7456-3371-8.
- Claes, Liesbeth (2022). "Augustan Images of Legitimacy: The Numismatic Memory of Augustus (AD 14-268)". In Cavalieri, Marco; Assenmaker, Pierre; Cavagna, Mattia; Engels, David (eds.). Augustus through the Ages: Receptions, Readings and Appropriations of the Historical Figure of the First Roman Emperor. Collection Latomus. Vol. 366. Brussels: Peeters Publishers. pp. 79–106. doi:10.2307/jj.10574832.4. ISBN 978-90-429-4962-1.
- Cooley, Alison E. (2019-07-04). "From the Augustan Principate to the Invention of the Age of Augustus". Journal of Roman Studies. 109: 71–87. doi:10.1017/s0075435819000674. ISSN 0075-4358.
- Drogula, Fred K. (2015). Commanders & Command in the Roman Republic and Early Empire. Chapel Hill: University of North Carolina Press. ISBN 978-1-4696-2126-5.
- Eck, Werner; Takács, Sarolta A. (2003). The Age of Augustus. Translated by Schneider, Deborah Lucas (first ed.). Oxford: Blackwell Publishing. ISBN 0-631-22957-4.
- Eck, Werner; Takács, Sarolta A. (2007) [2003]. The Age of Augustus. Translated by Schneider, Deborah Lucas (second ed.). Oxford: Blackwell Publishing. ISBN 978-1-4051-5149-8.
- Eck, Werner (2016), "The Emperor, the Law and Imperial Administration", The Oxford Handbook of Roman Law and Society, translated by Schneider, Deborah Lucas (second ed.), Oxford University Press, pp. 98–110, doi:10.1093/oxfordhb/9780198728689.013.8, ISBN 978-0-19-872868-9
- Eder, Walter (2005). "Augustus and the Power of Tradition". In Galinsky, Karl (ed.). The Cambridge Companion to the Age of Augustus. Cambridge Companions to the Ancient World. Cambridge and New York: Cambridge University Press. pp. 13–32. ISBN 978-0-521-80796-8.
- Galinsky, Karl (2005). "Introduction". In Galinsky, Karl (ed.). The Cambridge Companion to the Age of Augustus (PDF). Cambridge Companions to the Ancient World. Cambridge and New York: Cambridge University Press. pp. 1–10. ISBN 978-0-521-80796-8.
- Galinsky, Karl (2012). Augustus: Introduction to the Life of an Emperor. New York: Cambridge University Press. ISBN 978-0-521-74442-3.
- Goldsworthy, Adrian (28 Sep 2010). How Rome Fell: Death of a Superpower. Yale University Press. ISBN 978-0300164268.
- Goldsworthy, Adrian (2014). Augustus: First Emperor of Rome. New Haven: Yale University Press. ISBN 978-0-300-17827-2.
- Gruen, Erich S. (2005). "Augustus and the Making of the Principate". In Galinsky, Karl (ed.). Cambridge Companion to the Age of Augustus. Cambridge Companions to the Ancient World. Cambridge, MA; New York: Cambridge University Press. pp. 33–52. ISBN 978-0-521-80796-8.
- Holland, Richard (2005). Augustus, Godfather of Europe. Stroud, Gloucestershire: Sutton. ISBN 978-0-7509-2911-0.
- Mackay, Christopher S. (2004). Ancient Rome: A Military and Political History. Cambridge and New York: Cambridge University Press. ISBN 978-0-521-80918-4.
- Millar, Fergus (2009-08-15), "2 Triumvirate and Principate", Augustus, Edinburgh University Press, pp. 60–89, doi:10.1515/9781474467964-009, ISBN 978-1-4744-6796-4
- Mitchell, Hannah; Morrell, Kit; Osgood, Josiah; Welch, Kathryn (2019-12-05), The Alternative Augustan Age, Oxford University PressNew York, pp. 1–11, doi:10.1093/oso/9780190901400.003.0001, ISBN 978-0-19-090140-0
- Mommsen, Theodor (1996). A history of Rome under the emperors. London; New York: Routledge. ISBN 978-0-415-10113-4.
- Nicols, John (2014). Civic patronage in the Roman Empire. Mnemosyne supplements. Leiden: Brill. ISBN 978-90-04-21466-8.
- Richardson, John Stuart (2012). Augustan Rome, 44 BC to AD 14: the Restoration of the Republic and the Establishment of the Empire. The Edinburgh History of Ancient Rome. Edinburgh University Press. ISBN 978-0-7486-1955-9.
- Roberts, John (2007). "Princeps senatus". Oxford Dictionary of the Classical World. Oxford Reference. p. 858. doi:10.1093/acref/9780192801463.001.0001. ISBN 978-0-19-280146-3.
- Roller, Duane W. (2010). Cleopatra: a biography. Oxford and New York: Oxford University Press. ISBN 978-0-19-536553-5.
- Scullard, H. H. (1982) [1959]. From the Gracchi to Nero: A History of Rome from 133 B.C. to A.D. 68 (5th ed.). London; New York: Routledge. ISBN 978-0-415-02527-0.
- Shotter, David (2005) [1991]. Augustus Caesar (2nd ed.). London and New York: Routledge. ISBN 0-415-31935-8.
- Southern, Pat (1998). Augustus. Roman Imperial Biographies (first ed.). London and New York: Routledge. ISBN 978-0-415-16631-7.
- Southern, Pat (2014) [1998]. Augustus. Roman Imperial Biographies (second ed.). London and New York: Routledge. ISBN 978-0-415-62838-9.
- Wells, Colin Michael (1995). The Roman Empire. Cambridge, Massachusetts: Harvard University Press. ISBN 978-0-674-77770-5.
- Westphal, Heiko (2025). "The Julio-Claudian principate: tradition and transition, edited by Christina T. Kuhn (review)". Bryn Mawr Classical Review. 2025.12.21.
- Xinyue, Bobby (2022-06-16), "Divinization and the Inevitability of Augustan Rome", Politics and Divinization in Augustan Poetry, Oxford University Press, pp. 155–186, doi:10.1093/oso/9780192855978.003.0005, ISBN 978-0-19-285597-8
- Wang, Zhongxiao (2022-02-21), "Theodor Mommsen and His Legacy in the Study of the Early Roman Empire: A Critical Review", Western Historiography in Asia, De Gruyter, pp. 201–218, doi:10.1515/9783110717495-009, ISBN 978-3-11-071749-5
