= Joelle (actress) =

Actress and singer

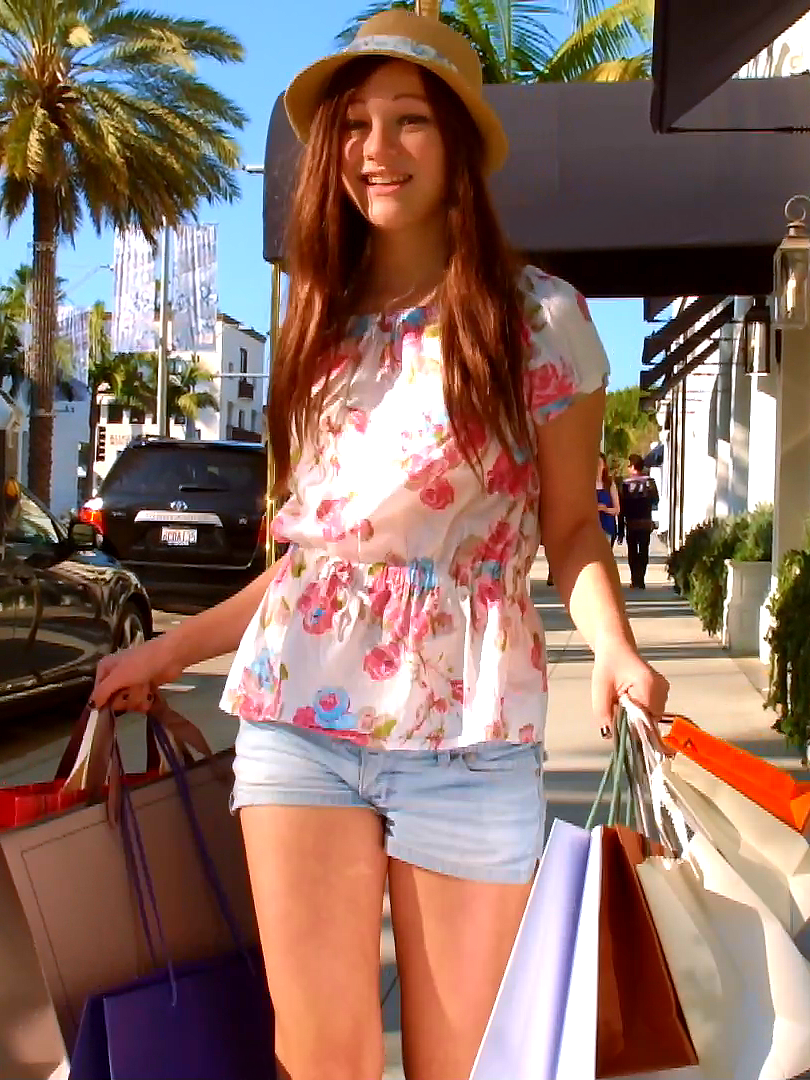
- Joelle filming her music video for "Big in L.A." in 2012 wearing a brunette wig before her media reveal
- Born: Joelle Mia Renee Joelle
- Occupations: Actress; singer
- Years active: 2012–present
- Musical career
- Genres: Pop; dance
- Instrument: Vocals
- Website: joelle.music

Joelle is an actress and singer, professionally known by the mononym, whose roles include Joiya Byir in Amazon Prime Video's fantasy series The Wheel of Time (2023–2025), Vipsania in MGM+/Sky's drama series Domina (2023), and the character Joelle in Paul Feig's Netflix original film The School for Good and Evil (2022). Joelle made her feature debut in Denis Villeneuve's Dune (2021).

== Early life and career beginnings ==
Joelle was referred in her early teens to vocal coach Peggy Still Johnson, a governor of the Recording Academy Atlanta chapter, by Grammy Award–winning mixer Phil Tan. Joelle was later vocal coached by Daniel Thomas, former choir director of the London Community Gospel Choir.

Joelle made her first media appearances at 13, campaigning about bullying awareness on ABC News in the US and on national UK television. Her television appearances followed extensive press coverage of a homemade music video, "Big in LA", that Joelle had uploaded to YouTube. "Big in LA" was nominated for a Golden Trellick Award at the 2013 Portobello Film Festival in London and won the Best Music Video award at the 9th annual LA Femme International Film Festival in Los Angeles.

In her teens, Joelle gained experience in journalism, hosting video interviews for national and independent media outlets, with personalities such as Dave Filoni, Mark Hamill and Andy Serkis. In 2017, Joelle videoed herself in front of a series of T-shirts hanging in the color sequence of a rainbow while singing a live performance of "True Colors". The video was posted on Facebook and went viral, receiving over four million views.

== Acting career ==
In 2019, Joelle directed and performed in her first short film, Cover Up, featuring original sound recordings co-created with Oscar-nominated songwriter Diane Warren, who wrote the lyrics and music.

In 2021, Joelle made her feature film debut in Denis Villeneuve's Dune, later credited in Dune: Part Two (2024). In 2022, Joelle played the character Joelle in Paul Feig's Netflix original film The School for Good and Evil.

Deadline announced in December 2022 that Joelle would be joining the cast of MGM+ and Sky's second season of Domina, playing Vipsania, wife of Tiberius. In an interview Joelle stated that the show focuses on the rise and fall of "one of the greatest empires", with contrasting comments that, while being advanced ahead of its time, the level of cruelty was "unimaginable".

On May 13, 2023, it was announced that Joelle would be appearing in seasons 2 and 3 of American high fantasy television series The Wheel of Time as Joiya Byir, later being confirmed as an Aes Sedai of the Gray Ajah skilled in political manipulation, negotiation, and associated with the instruction of novices and Accepted.

== Alopecia awareness campaigning ==
Joelle was diagnosed with alopecia universalis at the age of 8 and is an ambassador for the UK charity Alopecia UK. Joelle stated in a BBC broadcast in 2017 that she does not think she would be the person she is today if not for alopecia, and that she is happy.

In an Evening Standard article in 2022, Joelle described how she has experienced being judged in the entertainment industry, where alopecia has historically been viewed negatively. Joelle commented that she feels this is changing. The article headlined with an image illustrating Joelle in one half of the picture with hair and in the other half without. The picture is an uncropped version of an alopecia awareness campaign poster made public online by Joelle in 2018, which originally contained the text, "I see the same person on each side, do you?"

== Filmography ==
=== Film ===
Year	Title	Role	Notes	Ref.
2019	Cover Up		Short film	
2021	Dune	Baron Servant		
2022	The School for Good and Evil	Joelle		
2024	Dune: Part Two	Baron Servant		

=== Television ===
Year	Title	Role	Notes	Ref.
2023	Domina	Vipsania	Season 2	
2023	The Wheel of Time	Joiya Byir	Season 2	
2025	The Wheel of Time	Joiya Byir	Season 3	
