= Roman Constitution =

Set of guidelines and principles

The Roman constitution was one of the general means by which the Roman people were governed. They were all unwritten. The first constitutional system of which anything meaningful is known is that of the Roman Republic. It developed after the overthrow of the Roman monarchy (traditionally dated to 509 BC). The second was that of the Roman Empire, which developed from that of the republic gradually during the early imperial period (from 27 BC on).

== Republican constitution ==
Very little concrete is known about the government of the regal period. The republican constitution emerged in the third and fourth centuries BC through the Conflict of the Orders. It had three main bodies: the magistrates, the senate, and the people.

There were many magistrates, of which the most important were the consuls and the plebeian tribunes. Almost all magistrates served for a term of one year. The consuls' main role was to lead the republic's armies in war, and were endowed with the power to command (imperium) and consult the gods through auspices for this purpose with the more junior praetors, though in the late republic both consuls and praetors mainly had civil functions. The plebeian tribunes emerged from the conflict of the orders with the power to veto any other magistrate's actions. They were also, for much of the republic, the main legislators, with the power to call an assembly of the people and propose laws.

The senate was a body made up of former magistrates. It convened to offer advice to the magistrates but the collective influence of all the senior statesmen of the body made that advice, in many cases, essentially binding. The extent of deference to the senate and its decisions waxed and waned over time but was sufficiently strong during the republican period to find it regularly directing magistrates both on what to do and how to do it. This influence was especially strong in the administration of public religion, finance, and foreign affairs, including the assignment of magistrates to military commands.

All magistrates were elected by the people in various assemblies. There were three relevant ones in the middle and late republics: the centuriate assembly, the tribal assembly, and the plebeian council. The former was made up of centuriae into which each citizen was assigned based on wealth, with richer centuries having fewer citizens but still one vote. The tribal assembly and plebeian council were both organised by tribes, into which citizens were assigned by geography. There were thirty-five tribes, with thirty-one assigned to rural areas and four assigned to the city. The number of citizens assigned to each tribe varied wildly, with urban tribes having substantially more citizens than rural ones. These assignments were done by the censors in the census, which counted citizens and assessed their wealth. Moreover, the logistics of participation – all votes had to be given in person at Rome – meant that the rural poor were unlikely to regularly participate.

The centuriate assembly elected the consuls, praetors, and censors, presided over usually by a consul. The tribal assembly elected the junior magistrates like aediles and quaestors; the plebeian council, in which only plebeians could participate, elected the plebeian tribunes and aediles. All assemblies also had the power to make laws, though almost all laws were made in the plebeian council. In doing so they only had the right to vote for or against a law proposed by a magistrate: citizens could not themselves bring proposals or amend one brought by the presiding magistrate. Prior to bringing legislation, however, it was customary for magistrates to give speeches to an informal assembly called a contio where they would try to convince and take feedback from the citizenry.

In times of emergency, a consul could appoint a dictator, who usually exercised absolute command over some duty before resigning on its completion or after six months. The early republic's dictators were mostly called to fight wars or to conduct elections. Many of the functions of the dictatorship were replaced by promagistrates, men – usually but not always former magistrates – who were appointed to serve in place of a consul or praetor (pro consule or pro praetore) in command of some war, army, or province.

== Imperial constitution ==
The imperial constitution developed from Augustus' victory in the civil wars of the late first century BC. In two settlements, he claimed to give up his wartime powers and restore a republican form of government but actually subverted republican precedents to establish him as the legal head of the state with power to involve himself in any matter and overrule all other magistrates. There were two mechanisms by which he did this. He assumed an imperium maius pro consule so to govern most of the provinces and command the armies therein. He also assumed tribunicia potestas, the power of a plebeian tribune, so to call the senate, propose legislation, and exercise a veto. More importantly, however, was the dominant influence he had over politics, which made it impossible for other politicians to meaningfully challenge his rule.

Later developments in imperial rule caused it to gradually shed its republican gloss, becoming more clearly and obviously an autocratic monarchial system organised around an influential imperial court. By the third century, this system had become fully bureaucratised and legally sovereign where the emperor through his officials could make or unmake any legal decision anywhere in the empire.

== Bibliography ==
- Boatwright, Mary; Gargola, Daniel J; Lenski, Noel Emmanuel; Talbert, Richard J A (2014). A brief history of the Romans (2nd ed.). Oxford University Press. ISBN 978-0-19-998755-9.
- Lintott, Andrew (1999). Constitution of the Roman republic. Oxford University Press. ISBN 978-0-19-926108-6. Reprinted 2009.
