= Dangerous Liaisons (TV series) =

2022 TV series

- Genre: Period drama
- Created by: Harriet Warner
- Based on: Dangerous Liaisons by Pierre Choderlos de Laclos
- Country of origin: United States
- Original language: English
- No. of seasons: 1
- No. of episodes: 8

Production
- Executive producers: Harriet Warner; Colin Callender; Tony Krantz; Bethan Jones; Scott Huff; Christopher Hampton
- Producer: Barney Reisz
- Running time: 54–59 minutes
- Production companies: Playground Entertainment; Flame Ventures; Lionsgate Television

Original release
- Network: Starz
- Release: November 6 – December 25, 2022

Dangerous Liaisons is an American period drama television series, loosely based upon the novel of the same name by Pierre Choderlos de Laclos. It premiered on Starz on November 6, 2022. Ahead of its premiere, the series was renewed for a second season. In December 2022, the series was canceled, reversing the early renewal. It was also reported that the executive producers were shopping the series elsewhere.

== Cast and characters ==
=== Main cast ===
- Nicholas Denton as Pascal Valmont
- Alice Englert as Camille
- Hakeem Kae-Kazim as Majordome
- Hilton Pelser as Gabriel Carré
- Kosar Ali as Victoire
- Nathanael Saleh as Azolan
- Paloma Faith as Florence de Régnier
- Maria Friedman as Berthe
- Colette Dalal Tchantcho as Ondine, Vicomtesse de Valmont
- Mia Threapleton as Rose
- Fisayo Akinade as Theo, Chevalier de Saint-Jacques
- Clare Higgins as Madame Jericho
- Antonia Campbell-Hughes as Marie Antoinette
- Kathryn Wilder as Eloise de Chalon
- Matthew Steer as Emile
- Lesley Manville as Geneviève de Merteuil
- Michael McElhatton as Jean de Merteuil
- Carice van Houten as Jacqueline de Montrachet
- Tom Wlaschiha as Henri de Montrachet
- Lucy Cohu as Christine, Comtesse de Sevigny
- Dimitri Gripari as Danceny
- Matilda Tucker as Suzette
- Miltos Yerolemou as Antoine
- Maggie O'Neill
- Christian McKay
- Agnes O'Casey as Emilie de Sevigny
- Richard Earl as Duc de Lanvin
- Sarah E Bentley as Duchesse de Lanvin

=== Guest cast ===
- Gabriel Andrews as Opera Goer

== Episodes ==
No.	Title	Directed by	Written by	Original release date	U.S. viewers (millions)
1	"Love or War"	Leonora Lonsdale	Harriet Warner	November 6, 2022	0.088
In 1783 Paris, young lovers Pascal Valmont (an impoverished mapmaker cut off from his inheritance and rightful title by his evil stepmother Ondine) and Camille (a prostitute indebted to Madame Jericho) share a tryst on a vast map of the city. Pascal proposes marriage, assuring her of his plan to better their fortunes; Camille's friend and maid Victoire voices her contempt and mistrust of Pascal. Unbeknownst to Camille, Pascal leads a secret life as a libertine servicing lonely aristocratic women in lavish borrowed apartments. Madame Geneviève de Merteuil, Valmont's foremost client, demands her explicit letters be returned, which he refuses, keeping the letters as insurance until Merteuil awards him with a title. Camille learns of Pascal's indiscretions when she finds one of Merteuil's letters in his bag. Having overheard their conversation, Victoire disguises herself as a boy and steals the cache of letters from the mapmakers' vault. Anti-vice official Gabriel Carré saves Camille from a violent john outside the Opéra and later attempts to procure her services, which she violently refuses on her way to elope with Pascal. Pascal is late to their meeting because he detours to meet with client Florence de Regnier, who promises him a gift. After having read the letters of Valmont's numerous conquests, a heartbroken Camille demands to see Madame de Merteuil and blackmails her into welcoming her into society, complete with a new wardrobe, identity, and training. Back at the Opéra, Merteuil calls Valmont out as a blackmailer and threatens to expose him before she and Camille enjoy Mozart's Die Entführung aus dem Serail.
2	"Conquer or Die"	Leonora Lonsdale	Harriet Warner	November 13, 2022	N/A
Camille returns Merteuil's letters; as she burns them, Merteuil advises Camille to harness her talents to leverage people's secrets. After a final letter to her husband, Merteuil falls fatally down the staircase. Camille has flashbacks as the servants powder Merteuil's funerary wig: Camille banished by her former mistress, being carted away in the wintertime, Victoire attempting to rouse her before Camille is collected by Jericho's men. (It is implied that Camille attempted suicide by slitting her wrists.) Camille reads all of Valmont's clients' letters as she recalls their initial meeting: Pascal paid for a week with Camille, seeking to understand women so that he be may be their equal. Carré begins purchasing Camille from Jericho in installments. The Majordome suggests Camille comfort Merteuil's mourners, which include Florence, who derides Camille. Yet Florence changes her tune after Camille quotes lines from her letters to Valmont. Florence later threatens to kill both Valmont and Camille if he approaches her again and banishes him, naked, from her carriage. Valmont confronts Camille and demands the return of his letters, noting that he's been punished and learned his lesson. Camille refuses to waver. The Marquis returns and expels Camille. Carré gets Valmont fired from his job and vows to ruin him for betraying Camille. After Majordome is fired by the Marquis, he allows Camille to read the Marquise's final letter, a confession that she committed suicide to escape her empty marriage. Camille uses this information to blackmail the Marquis into allowing her and Majordome to remain. At the funeral, Camille is taken aback to encounter Jacqueline de Montrachet, her former mistress, and vows revenge. At the opera, Camille espies Valmont wooing his next conquest, an elderly widow.
3	"Even God Does Not Forgive"	Leonora Lonsdale	Harriet Warner	November 20, 2022	N/A
Over a simple breakfast, Valmont assures Azolan that their fortunes will soon improve due to his new "friend," the Comtesse de l'Ancenis, who summons him to a rendezvous at Madame Berthe, clothier to the nobility. However, it is Camille who has arranged a meeting to gift Valmont with a more opulent wardrobe and promise to grant him a second chance if he can seduce Madame de Montrachet in mind and body, with a letter as proof. Camille is shaken by the stripping of black from the household, signifying an end to mourning, and the arrival of Geneviève's cousin, the Comtesse de Sevigny, delighting in the possibility of exposing Camille as an impostor. Carré visits Ondine seeking proof of Valmont's libertinism with the aim of imprisoning him. The Majordome gifts Camille with Geneviève's devotional book with details about her life written in the margins, helping her save face at dinner. The Comtesse's friendly daughter Emilie and her music tutor Danceny suggest hiring a mesmerist to commune with Geneviève's spirit. A corpse drawn from the Seine is mistakenly identified as Camille. Victoire realizes the smudged word in Merteuil's final letter is "Ariadne," a woman the Merteuils may have wronged. During the séance, when Sevigny attempts to expose Camille, Camille shouts "Ariadne!," perturbing the Marquis. The mesmerist glimpses Camille's painful past as Victoire faints. Valmont, after a failed initial attempt, manages to make the acquaintance of the outwardly pious Montrachet after Mass at Saint-Sauveur. A hooded Camille douses Montrachet with a bucket of pig's blood as she utters the very words of her former mistress, "Even God does not forgive!"
4	"You Don't Know Me"	Leonora Lonsdale	James Dormer	November 27, 2022	0.052
Flashbacks depict Camille's past as an orphan taken into the Montrachet home, with Madame promising to be her surrogate mother. Valmont demands to renegotiate the terms of his agreement with Camille and questions what Montrachet means to her. Montrachet has refused to leave the house since the attack, and her husband reminds her of her duty to attend a talk at the Foreign Mission Society. Christine de Sevigny cryptically warns Camille that "the game is up… change is coming," as it is later revealed that her daughter Emilie is engaged to the Marquis. Valmont begs Camille to find out how his scheming stepmother Ondine was able to influence his father into disinheriting him. At Madame Berthe's, Camille befriends the Vicomtesse and garners an invitation to tea; Ondine takes Camille under her wing and dispenses advice for survival and announces the engagement of her son, Prévan, to Cécile de Volanges. Valmont progresses in connecting with Montrachet, blackmailing her fornicating maid and valet into helping. Montrachet marvels at "Monsieur Lucienne's" devotion to God and pledges funds to open his school for orphans. The Marquis successfully extracts his late wife's letter from the Majordome and burns it. Carré is warned by his boss for pursuing a personal matter and later attempts to dress and bury the "Camille" corpse, only to extract a stone on a cord from its throat. Victoire and Camille flee to Valmont's, where he helps Camille dress as Prévan to gain entry into the illicit brothel, The Labyrinth, in order to find Ariadne. The courtesan admits to Camille that the Marquis owns them all and rewards those who extract secrets from high society clients. After narrowly escaping a guard, Camille returns to Saint-Honoré, where the Majordome urges her to leave. Camille spitefully declares that he doesn't know her as the strains of the Vengeance Aria play.
5	"The World Should Be Afraid of Us"	Olly Blackburn	Coline Abert & Harriet Warner	December 4, 2022	0.087
After crashing at Pascal's for the night, Camille makes a surprise appearance at the Marquis' engagement party at Rambouillet; she urges him to fulfill the Marquise's promise. Pascal intercepts Jacqueline en route to give alms and, witnessing her charity, has misgivings about seducing her. Carré attends a lecture-demonstration by surgeon Montrachet and asks for help identifying what killed the "Camille" corpse, nicknamed "Ariadne" by the doctor; Montrachet offers to remove Carré's lame left hand, which he vehemently refuses. At the engagement party, Ondine proposes that Camille unite the Marquis and herself in exchange for clout. Emilie apologizes to Danceny, her true love, for the arranged marriage. Christine attempts to humiliate Camille by announcing the contredance allemande, but Theo instructs her to follow him, and Camille has flashbacks to dancing with Montrachet. Valmont meets Camille and expresses disgust at his task of seducing Jacqueline. Camille gets drunk with Ondine to extract information about Pascal: he spread vicious rumors about Ondine and slept with Christine. Pascal admits to Jacqueline that he was haunted by the memory of his mother's murder while almsgiving. Camille discovers a letter to Valmont from Christine ("Musket"), which reveals Christine's sexual relationship with the queen. Camille initially allies herself with Ondine and threatens the Comtesse to call off the engagement. Jacqueline visits Pascal and brings him her husband's book about the search for the soul, praying for the mutual intense feelings that they can never consummate. Victoire catches Ondine rummaging through Camille's trunk. Montrachet announces to his wife he will be physician to the king at Versailles, a chance for them to start anew, to her dismay. In a bombshell conclusion, the Marquis publicly breaks his engagement with Emilie, refusing to unite his house with a corrupt one, producing the incriminating letter for the Princess de Lamballe to read; promising to be his equal, Camille is to wed the Marquis.
6	"You Are Not My Equal"	Olly Blackburn	Rita Kalnejais	December 11, 2022	N/A
In the Merteuil crypt, Pascal is abhorred by the sight of the ruthless Camille in the aftermath of Rambouillet. At Madame Berthe's, as preparations for the Masked Ball are underway, Ondine details the utter ruin of the Sevigny family: Christine is disowned, shorn, and headed for a convent, and Maurice and Emilie are pariahs. Camille delights in flaunting her engagement to Merteuil, but Ondine threatens Camille. The masks are chosen by Madame Berthe as reflections of the wearer: Camille is a fox, Jacqueline a lamb, and Montrachet a wolf. The masks offer carte blanche for any depraved behavior for one night. Jacqueline begs Pascal to attend the ball for a tryst before the Montrachets relocate to Versailles. After realizing Camille's intent to destroy the Montrachets, Victoire seeks Pascal's help. Camille offers Jean secrets in an attempt to extract a formal commitment. Pascal and Jacqueline unwittingly find themselves in a room full of masked fornicators before Pascal sends Jacqueline home. Her resolve steeled upon hearing the news of Montrachet's appointment, Camille confronts Henri with scissors to his throat, only to find that Pascal is wearing the wolf mask. Camille recounts her rape and impregnation at Henri's hand, the death of her baby girl, and expulsion. Pascal vows to seduce Jacqueline and bids Camille return to him the next day to start a new life. Camille finds a distraught Marie Antoinette lamenting the betrayal and absence of Christine. At Saint-Honoré, Camille is alarmed to find that Victoire has fled along with the letters and prepares to admit defeat to Jean. Tearfully declaring that Camille is above his equal and that he cannot be without her, the Marquis slips an engagement ring on a surprised Camille's finger.
7	"Here Is My Soul"	Olly Blackburn	Harriet Warner	December 18, 2022	N/A
Camille plots to give the queen an incriminating letter in Jacqueline’s hand, but Pascal assures her that it would be better delivered by himself. Back at Saint-Honoré, Camille is overwhelmed by the Marquis’ affection and begs him to reconsider the engagement. Montrachet warns Jacqueline that one of his students saw her with Lucienne at the ball. Carré pursues a lead at the abandoned Labyrinth Club, whereas Camille blackmails Prévan into renouncing his title in exchange for her silence about his infidelities. Jacqueline implores Lucienne to visit her once more and, just as Pascal is about to ravish her, reveals the truth about how she stole Camille’s daughter, Odette. Pascal departs, overcome with emotion, and pens Jacqueline a letter organizing their escape with Odette. Ondine declares that Camille’s attempt to ruin Prévan means having to deal with her first. Carré’s boss, Abbayé, has an audience with Jean: Gabriel has been fishing Ariadnes from the Seine, the club is closed, but the Duc needs more women. Abbayé suggests the mysterious and discreet Camille as a possibility, which Jean refuses. Jacqueline’s maid thwarts the escape plan, and Henri’s footmen incapacitate Pascal. Camille waits in vain for Pascal before visiting his abandoned apartment, where she finds a drunk and disconsolate Theo, still without a libretto for his imminent opera. Camille supplies him with a story about depraved Parisian society. At a revolutionaries’ gathering, Victoire throws Pascal’s letters into the fire, only for Rose to retrieve them. Camille and Jean wed in the middle of the night and consummate their marriage. Victoire returns to Saint-Honoré as the Marquis places the “Ariadne” spool of thread on Camille’s sleeping figure. Jean ominously approaches Victoire, who passes out as the screen fades to black.
8	"It's War"	Olly Blackburn	Harriet Warner	December 25, 2022	0.039
Camille awakens to an emptied Saint-Honoré: Majordome informs her that she and Jean will live in Saint-Domingue indefinitely. Ondine leaves her calling card with Azolan, hinting at a proposition for Pascal. Henri has sent away Odette and threatens Jacqueline with committal if gossip emerges. Camille finds Victoire bound underground, a future Ariadne, and, after a struggle, strangles Jean with Majordome and Victoire as witnesses. Jacqueline visits the imprisoned Pascal, and they plan their escape after the opera. Abbayé plies Carré with money to forget the Labyrinth Club. Victoire seeks a new life in the New World but helps Camille dress a last time. Etienne (Majordome) assures Camille he will dispose of the corpse, but they realize it needs to be found for Camille to retain her status. After a promising start, the opera receives the vocal disgust of the nobility, and Jacqueline flees. Camille confronts her and vows to continue to avenge Henri’s abuse before finding Pascal in her carriage. Carré notices ligature marks on Jean’s neck. Rose flees for a better life, Pascal’s letters in tow. During his audience with the Marquise, Carré notices the ribbons on her wrists and realizes she is Camille. He asserts his ownership of her and blackmails her into penning Pascal a letter that she manipulated and never loved him. Pascal implores Ondine to listen to his terms. At the funeral, Pascal declares war on Camille as Carré lurks.

== Production ==
=== Development ===
In November 2013, it was announced Christopher Hampton would adapt Dangerous Liaisons by Pierre Choderlos de Laclos, with Colin Callender and Tony Krantz set to serve as executive producers, with BBC set to distribute in the United Kingdom. In July 2019, it was announced Starz had ordered and greenlit the series, with Harriet Warner set to serve as showrunner and writer, with BBC no longer attached, and Hampton no longer attached as writer, and only as executive producer. In November 2022, Starz renewed the series for a second season. The following month, Starz canceled the series. However, the remaining episodes of the first season will air as scheduled. It was also reported that the executive producers are currently shopping the series elsewhere.

=== Casting ===
In May 2021, Alice Englert and Nicholas Denton joined the cast of the series. In June 2021, Lesley Manville, Carice van Houten, Paloma Faith, Michael McElhatton, Kosar Ali, Nathanael Saleh, Hakeem Kae-Kazim, Hilton Pelser, Mia Threapleton, Colette Dalal Tchantcho, Lucy Cohu, Fisayo Akinade, Maria Friedman and Clare Higgins joined the cast of the series.

=== Filming ===
Principal photography began in the Czech Republic in May 2021.

== Reception ==
The review aggregator website Rotten Tomatoes reported a 50% approval rating with an average rating of 6.3/10, based on 14 critic reviews. The website's critics consensus reads, "While Alice Englert and Nicholas Denton make for a convincingly dangerous duo, this prequel to the esteemed novel feels too calculated to stir up a ton of heat." Metacritic, which uses a weighted average, assigned a score of 57 out of 100 based on 9 critics, indicating "mixed or average reviews".
