= Oliver Huntingdon =

English actor

- Born: Oliver William Huntingdon; 8 April 2000 (age 26); Derby, Derbyshire England
- Occupation: Actor
- Years active: 2015–present

Oliver Huntingdon is an English television and film actor.

== Career ==
From Derby, he trained at the Television Workshop in Nottingham.

He was in CBBC’s Jamie Johnson, the feature film Just Charlie, and The End of the F***ing World for Channel 4, as well as the Roman historical drama Domina for Sky Atlantic, and the feature film The Colour Room alongside Phoebe Dynevor and Matthew Goode. His television credits also include The Rising, Silent Witness and Grantchester.

He appeared in the final series of Sally Wainwright's BBC One drama Happy Valley in 2023 as Ivan Sertic. He appeared as Ryan Bottomley in the second series of BBC One drama Sherwood in September 2024, written by Nottinghamshire playwright James Graham.

== Filmography ==
=== Film ===
| Year | Title | Role | Notes |
|---|---|---|---|
| 2017 | Just Charlie | Alex | |
| 2021 | The Colour Room | Reg | |
| 2023 | ManMade | Joe Holgate | Short film |

=== Television ===
| Year | Title | Role | Notes |
|---|---|---|---|
| 2019 | The End of the F***ing World | Sam | Series 2; episode 1 |
| 2021 | Domina | Young Agrippa | Series 1; episodes 1 & 2: "Fall" & "Rise" |
| 2022 | The Rising | Nicky | Series 1. 6 episodes |
| 2023 | Silent Witness | Wes Carter | Series 26; episodes 9 & 10: "Southbay: Parts 1 & 2" |
| 2023 | Happy Valley | Ivan Sertic | Series 3; 6 episodes |
| 2023 | Grantchester | Paulie Mansfield | Series 8; episode 2 |
| 2024 | Sherwood | Ryan Bottomley | Series 2; 6 episodes |
| 2025 | What It Feels Like for a Girl | Bradley | series 1. 3 episodes |
| 2025 | Riot Women | Carl Gaskell | series 1 3 episodes |
| 2026 | Patience | Leo Hargrove | Series 2; episode 7: "A Monk's Tale" |
