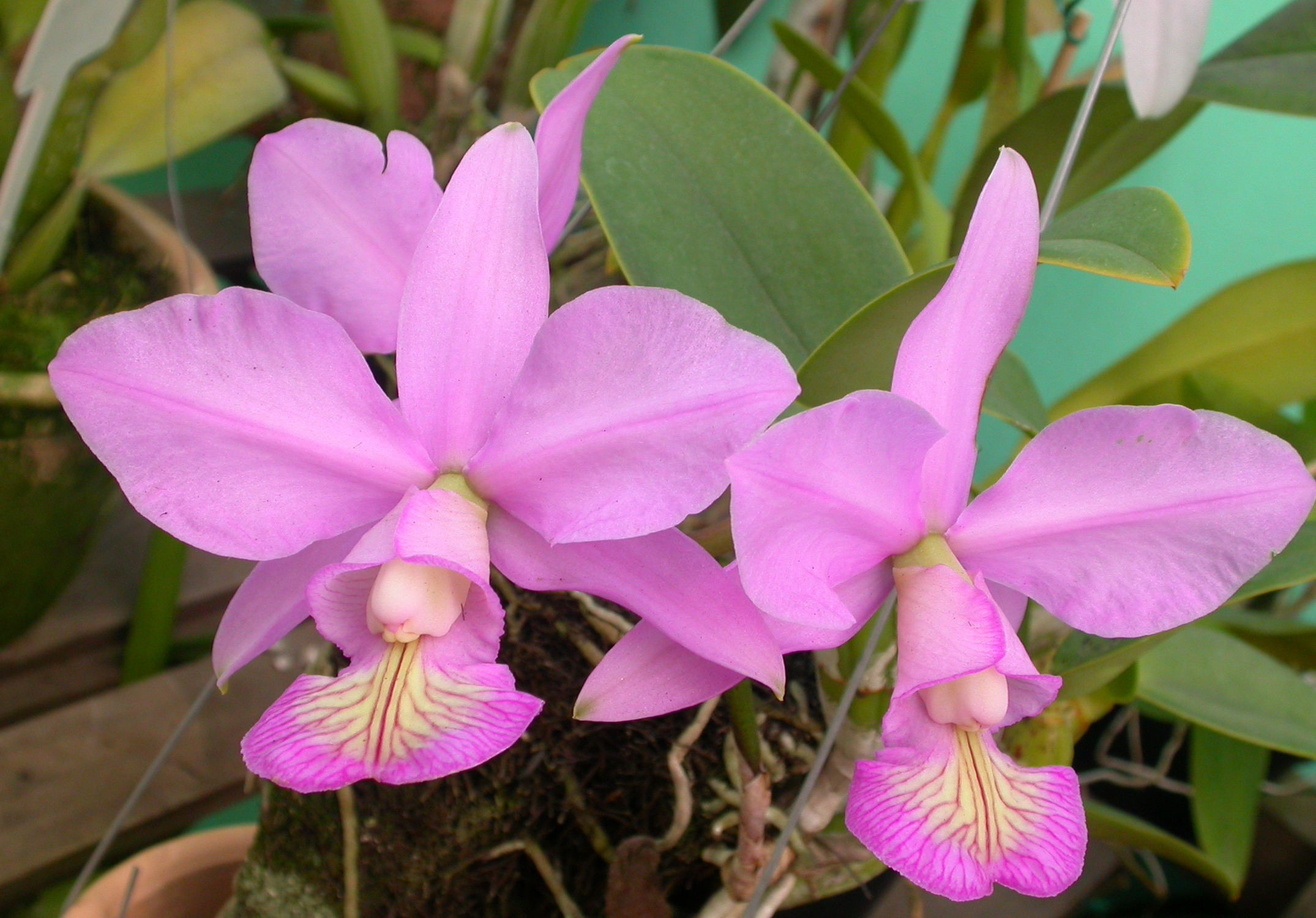

Scientific classification
- Kingdom: Plantae
- Clade: Tracheophytes
- Clade: Angiosperms
- Clade: Monocots
- Order: Asparagales
- Family: Orchidaceae
- Subfamily: Epidendroideae
- Genus: Cattleya
- Subgenus: Cattleya subg. Intermediae
- Species: C. nobilior

Binomial name
- Cattleya nobilior Rchb.f.

Synonyms
- Cattleya walkeriana var. nobilior (Rchb.f.) H.J. Veitch; Cattleya nobilior var. hugueneyi L. Linden & Rodigas; Cattleya nobilior var. amaliae Pabst; Cattleya nobilor var. amaliae Pabst; Cattleya nobilior var. alba L.C. Menezes

= Cattleya nobilior =

Species of orchid

Cattleya nobilior (literally "the more noble cattleya", referring to the flowers which are larger than those of C. walkeriana, the other rhizanthoid Cattleya, of which it was originally considered a variety) is a species of orchid. The rhizanthoid Cattleyas differ from the other species of Cattleya by having inflorescences which arise directly from the rhizome, instead of from the apex of the pseudobulb. The diploid chromosome number of C. nobilior has been determined as 2n = 42, which contrasts with the value of 2n = 40 for C. walkeriana.
