= Colette Dalal Tchantcho =

Actress and theatre maker

- Born: Kuwait
- Other name: Colette Tchantcho
- Education: Liverpool Institute for Performing Arts
- Occupations: Actress, theatre maker
- Years active: 2011–present

Colette Dalal Tchantcho is an actor and theatre maker based in the United Kingdom. They are known for their roles in the Sky Atlantic series Domina (2021) and the Starz series Dangerous Liaisons (2022).

They are genderfluid and go by they/them pronouns.

== Early life ==
Tchantcho was born in Kuwait to a Cameroonian father from Bangangté and a Kuwaiti mother from a Sunni family. They attended the British School in Kuwait (BSK). They graduated with a Bachelor of Arts in Acting from the Liverpool Institute for Performing Arts (LIPA) in 2011.

== Career ==
Tchantcho made their television debut in 2018 with guest appearances in the BBC One medical soap opera Doctors and the BBC Four documentary series Arena. They also played Orsino in Twelfth Night at the Royal Lyceum Theatre in Edinburgh and the Bristol Old Vic and toured Scotland with Eddie and the Slumber Girls. The following year, they played Véa in an episode of the Netflix fantasy series The Witcher.

In 2021, Tchantcho began starring as Antigone in the British-Italian Sky Atlantic and Sky Italia historical drama Domina, set in Ancient Rome and centred around Livia Drusilla (Kasia Smutniak). That same year, Tchantcho was cast as Ondine, Vicomtesse de Valmont in the Starz adaptation of Dangerous Liaisons, which premiered in November 2022. They had performed Les Liaisons Dangereuses before during her time at LIPA. They are currently developing a one-person stage show titled Dreamer. They are also featured in the Paramount+ series No Escape.

== Filmography ==
Year	Title	Role	Notes
2018	Doctors	Joyce Langoya	Episode: "Suffer the Children"
2018	Arena	Alexa	Episode: "Make Me Up!"
2019	The Witcher	Véa	Episode: "Rare Species"
2020	I Am Mary	Mary	Short film
2021	Domina	Antigone	Main role
2021	Baba	Fatima	Short film
2022	Dangerous Liaisons	Ondine de Valmont	Main role
2023	No Escape	Shell	

== Stage ==
Year	Title	Role	Notes
2011	Slave: A Question of Freedom	Nanu / Various	Unity Theatre, Liverpool / Riverside Studios, London
2012	After the Rainfall		Watford Palace Theatre, Watford; Co-devisor
2016	Crazy God	Hamlet	Polish Theatre, Wrocław
2018	Eddie and the Slumber Sisters	Augusta	Scotland tour
2018	Twelfth Night	Orsino	Royal Lyceum Theatre, Edinburgh / Bristol Old Vic, Bristol
