= Nicholas Denton =

Australian actor

- Born: Australia
- Occupation: Actor
- Relatives: Jane Turner (mother)

Nicholas Denton is an Australian writer and stage and screen actor.

== Career ==
In 2017, Denton appeared with Lucy Moir in the John Kolvenbach play Love Song at the Melbourne Fringe Festival. He also appeared as Billy Bibbit in a version of One Flew Over The Cuckoo’s Nest at the South Bank Theatre in Melbourne. In 2018 Denton appeared in the play Wild by Mike Bartlett for the Melbourne Theatre Company, a role loosely based on whistle-blower Edward Snowden. According to Time Out Denton "navigates the shift in status beautifully" of the main character.

Denton appeared in the Australian TV series Glitch. Denton co-wrote with Bonnie Moir and appeared with Richard Moir in the short film Not Dark Yet. Denton played the son of a man with a degenerative disease. The film was premiered at the 2022 Melbourne International Film Festival.

Denton beat 200 or so actors to the role of Vicomte de Valmont in the television production of Dangerous Liaisons after passing a number of auditions and screen tests beginning in early 2020. The process was not straight forward, Denton's sister had to read parts with him during quarantine and COVID-19 lockdown which, given the nature of the scenes between Marquise de Merteuil and the Vicomte de Valmont, he described to the New York Times as "Disgusting. Bless her soul". Also, he and Englert had to do scenes together in different hotel rooms over Zoom and didn't meet in person until on set in Prague in 2021. Denton said he found the costumes from the period altered his posture by positioning his spine at a stricter angle. Denton described the sex scenes in the production as "not sex for the sake of sex. It's not gratuitous. It's actually quite beautifully emotional."

In September 2024, it was announced that Denton would portray Guy Anatole in Talamasca: The Secret Order.

== Personal life ==
He is the son of lawyer John Denton and comic actress and writer Jane Turner, known for her role as Kath in the TV sitcom Kath and Kim.

== Select filmography ==
=== Television ===
Year	Title	Role	Notes
2015–2017	Glitch	Angus	Recurring role
2019	My Life Is Murder	Finn	1 episode
2019	Utopia	Jamie	1 episode
2022	Dangerous Liaisons	Pascal Valmont	Main role
2025	Talamasca: The Secret Order	Guy Anatole	Main role
2026	The Airport Chaplain	Nino	5 episodes

=== Film ===
Year	Title	Role	Notes
2023	Jones Family Christmas	Danny Jones	
2023	Foe	Outermore Market Trader	
2021	The Unlit	Luke	
2020	Witches of Blackwood	Luke	
2015	Holding the Man	Tony	
2012	Kath & Kimderella	Nick	
