= Princeps =

Ancient Roman title

Princeps (plural: Principes) is a Latin word meaning "first in time or order; the first, foremost, chief, the most eminent, distinguished, or noble; the first person". As a title, Princeps originated in the Roman Republic wherein the leading member of the Senate was designated princeps senatus. It is primarily associated with the Roman emperors as an unofficial title first adopted by Augustus (r. 27 BC – AD 14) in 27 BC. But it could also refer to leading men of non-Roman states, as well as members of a social order or other elite groups. Its use in this context continued until the regime of Diocletian (r. 284–305) at the end of the third century. He preferred the title of dominus, meaning "lord" or "master". As a result, the Roman Empire from Augustus to Diocletian is termed the "principate" (principatus), and from Diocletian on the "dominate" (dominatus). Other historians define the reign of Augustus to Severus Alexander (r. 222–235) as the Principate, and the period afterwards as the "Autocracy".

The medieval title "Prince" goes back to princeps, as does the title Principal.

== Roman military ==
- See Principes (legionary heavy infantry soldier)
- centurio(n) in command of a unit or administrative office.
- Princeps ordinarius vexillationis: centurion in command of a vexillatio (detachment).
- Princeps peregrinorum ("commander of the foreigners"): centurion in charge of troops in the castra peregrina (military base at Rome for personnel seconded from the provincial armies)
- Princeps prior: Centurion commanding a manipulus (unit of two centuries) of principes (legionary heavy infantry).
- Princeps posterior: deputy to the Princeps prior
- Princeps praetorii: centurion attached to headquarters.

Princeps was also used as the second part of various other military titles, such as Decurio princeps, Signifer princeps (among the standard-bearers). See also Principalis (as in Optio principalis): NCO.

== Roman administration ==
Princeps is also the (official) short version of Princeps officii, the chief of an officium (the office staff of a Roman dignitary).

== Roman Emperor ==
Princeps civitatis ("First Citizen") was an official title of a Roman emperor, as the title determining the leader in Ancient Rome at the beginning of the Roman Empire. It created the principate Roman imperial system.

This usage of "Princeps" derived from the position of Princeps senatus, the "first among equals" of the Senate. The princeps senatus (plural principes senatus) was the first member by precedence of the Roman Senate, and his opinion would usually be asked first in senatorial debates.

It was first given as a special title to Caesar Augustus in 27 BC, who saw that use of the titles rex (king) or dictator would create resentment amongst senators and other influential men, who had earlier demonstrated their disapproval by supporting the assassination of Julius Caesar. While Augustus had political and military supremacy, he needed the assistance of his fellow Romans to manage the Empire. In his Res Gestae, Augustus claims auctoritas for the princeps (himself).

Various official titles were associated with the Roman Emperor. These titles included imperator, Augustus, Caesar, and later dominus (lord) and basileus (the Greek word for "sovereign").The word Emperor is derived from the Roman title "imperator", which was a very high, but not exclusive, military title until Augustus began to use it as his praenomen.

The Emperor Diocletian (284–305), the father of the Tetrarchy, was the first to stop referring to himself as "princeps" altogether, calling himself "dominus" (lord, master), thus dropping the pretense that emperor was not truly a monarchical office. The period when the emperors who called themselves princeps ruled—from Augustus to Diocletian—is called "the Principate".

=== Princeps iuventutis ===
Ancient Rome knew another kind of "princely" principes too, like "princeps iuventutis" ("the first amongst the young"), which in the early empire was frequently bestowed on eligible successors to the emperor, especially from his family. It was first given to Augustus' maternal grandsons Gaius and Lucius.

== Nobiliary legacy ==
"Princeps" is the root and Latin rendering of modern words as the English title and generic term prince (see that article, also for various equivalents in other languages), as the Byzantine version of Roman law was the basis for the legal terminology developed in feudal (and later absolutist) Europe.

== Non-Roman meaning ==
Princeps has been used in various scientific names, including the following:

- Princeps, a former genus of swallowtail butterflies now treated as a subgenus of Papilio
- Accipiter princeps, the New Britain goshawk
- Actenoides princeps, the scaly-breasted kingfisher
- Cattleya walkeriana var. princeps, a synonym for Cattleya walkeriana, an orchid species
- Emberiza flaviventris princeps, a subspecies of golden-breasted bunting found in Angola and Namibia
- Grallaria guatimalensis princeps, a subspecies of scaled antpitta found in Costa Rica and Panama
- Heterohyrax brucei princeps, a subspecies of yellow-spotted rock hyrax
- Melionyx princeps, the long-bearded melidectes
- Morphnarchus princeps, the barred hawk
- Triplofusus princeps, a tropical sea snail.
- Passerculus sandwichensis princeps, the Ipswich sparrow (a subspecies of Savannah sparrow)
- Ploceus princeps, the Príncipe weaver
- Psittacus timneh princeps, the Príncipe subspecies of Timneh parrot

== Fiction ==
- The Star Trek episode "Bread and Circuses" takes place on Magna Roma, an alternate Earth where the Roman Empire never fell. In this episode, the leader of Magna Roman society (Merikus, played by William Smithers) is referred to as First Citizen of his empire.
- In the Foundation series by Isaac Asimov, First Citizen is the title taken by the Mule and his successors in their position as leader of the Union of Worlds. Asimov had previously used the title "First Citizen of the State" for Korell's authoritarian ruler Commdor in the original Foundation novel.
- Princeps is the name of a dog that Brother Priad meets in the Warhammer 40,000 book Brothers of the Snake.
- Princeps is the title for the captain of a Titan, a massive humanoid war machine in the tabletop wargame Warhammer 40,000.
- In the book series Codex Alera by Jim Butcher, Princeps is the title given to the crown prince of the empire of Alera. It is also used in the title of the fifth book in the series, Princeps' Fury.
- In the Star Trek: Infinity's Prism book Seeds of Dissent by James Swallow, "Princeps" is the title for "Commander" Julian Bashir of the warship Defiance, which exists in an alternate universe from the more familiar 24th century envisioned in the television series Star Trek: Deep Space Nine.
- In the book The Three-Body Problem by Liu Cixin, "Princeps" is the title of the leader of the Trisolaran civilization.
- In the book The Magic Mountain by Thomas Mann, "Princeps Scholasticorum" is the title Settembrini uses to introduce Naphta.
- In the actual-play series Dimension 20: A Starstruck Oddysey by Dropout, Princeps Zortch is a non-binary member of Rubian V's royalty.

== See also ==
- Chief of the Name
- Head of state
