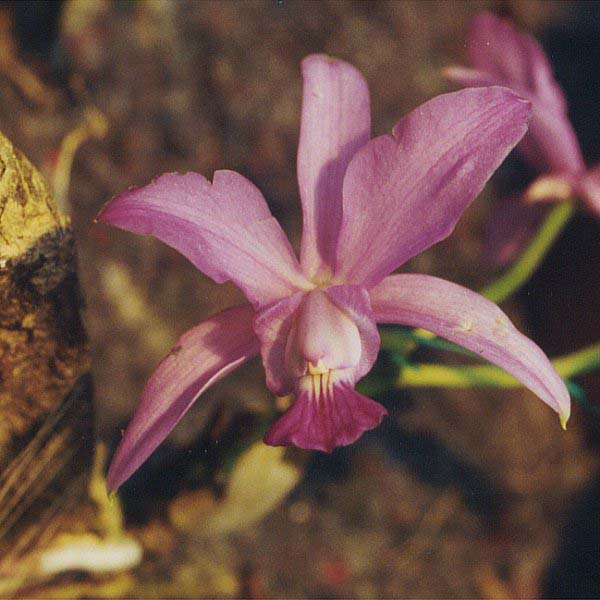

Scientific classification
- Kingdom: Plantae
- Clade: Tracheophytes
- Clade: Angiosperms
- Clade: Monocots
- Order: Asparagales
- Family: Orchidaceae
- Subfamily: Epidendroideae
- Genus: Cattleya
- Subgenus: Cattleya subg. Intermediae
- Species: C. walkeriana

Binomial name
- Cattleya walkeriana Gardner

Synonyms
- Cattleya bulbosa Lindl.; Cattleya gardneriana Rchb.f.; Cattleya princeps Barb. Rodr.; Cattleya walkeriana var. bulbosa (Lindl.) Fowlie; Cattleya walkeriana var. princeps L.C. Menezes; Epidendrum walkerianum (Gardner)Rchb.f.

= Cattleya walkeriana =

Species of orchid

Cattleya walkeriana, or Walker's cattleya, is a species of orchid. It differs from most species of Cattleya by having inflorescences which arise from the rhizome instead of from the apex of the pseudobulb (Note: The only other Cattleya species that exhibits this trait is C. nobilior.). In its native habitat (the Brazilian Central Plateau) it grows as either an epiphyte or a lithophyte, sometimes in full sun, at elevations up to 2000 meters (Note: In culture some protection from direct sun is needed, as plants not habituated to full sun will readily sunburn.). Pseudobulbs are relatively short, bulbous or fusiform, with one or two ovate leaves at the apex. Inflorescence is one- or few-flowered, about 8 in (20 cm) tall. Flowers are 4–5 in (10–13 cm) across.

Genetically, C. walkeriana is close to bifoliate Cattleyas. The diploid chromosome number of C. walkeriana has been twice determined as 2n = 40; the diploid chromosome number of the variety C. walkeriana var. princeps L.C.Menzes has been determined as 2n = 80.
