= Constitutional reforms of Augustus =

Laws enacted by Roman Emperor Augustus between 30 BC and 2 BC

The constitutional reforms of Augustus were a series of laws that were enacted by the Roman Emperor Augustus between 30 BC and 2 BC, which transformed the Constitution of the Roman Republic into the Constitution of the Roman Empire. The era during which these changes were made began when Augustus defeated Mark Antony and Cleopatra at the Battle of Actium in 31 BC, and ended when the Roman Senate granted Augustus the title "Pater Patriae" in 2 BC.

== First settlement ==
The clupeus uirtutis or shield of honour granted to Caesar Augustus by the Senate, apparently along with the name "Augustus" and the right to display an oak wreath over his door

Eschewing the open anti-elitism exhibited by Julius Caesar and Mark Anthony, Augustus modified the political system in this settlement, making it palatable to the senatorial classes of Rome.

In 28 BC Augustus invalidated the emergency powers of the civil war era and in the following year announced that he was returning all his powers and provinces to the Senate and the Roman people. After senatorial uproar at this prospect, Augustus, feigning reluctance, accepted a ten-year responsibility for the "disordered provinces". As a result, Augustus maintained his imperium over the provinces where the great majority of Rome's soldiery were stationed.

The second part of the settlement involved a change of title. Firstly, he would become princeps. Roughly translating as "first in order", this title traditionally meant leader of the Senate and assured the right to speak first in meetings. The title lent plausibility to his claim to be the restorer of republican institutions vitiated during the civil wars.

In 27 BC on the motion of L. Munatius Plancus, he was also given the honorific cognomen Augustus, which made his full name Imperator Caesar divi filius Augustus. Imperator stressed military power and victory, emphasising his role as commander-in-chief. Divi filius, translating as ‘son of the divine’, showed that whilst he himself didn't have a "god complex" and wasn't an autocrat, he was on the shoulders of the gods, enhancing his legitimacy. Caesar forged a connection to the deified Julius, illustrating where he got his authority. This would have gone down well with Rome's urban poor. Lastly, Augustus was a stamp of religious authority. Meaning "the illustrious" or "the majestic", it associated the ruler with Rome's traditions, gave him extra-constitutional status, served as a demarcation from "Octavian's reign of terror", and was not too suggestive of autocracy like rex.

The first settlement put him in an ideal political position. As summed up by the Res Gestae:

"After this time I excelled all in influence [auctoritas], although I possessed no more official power than others"

== Second settlement ==
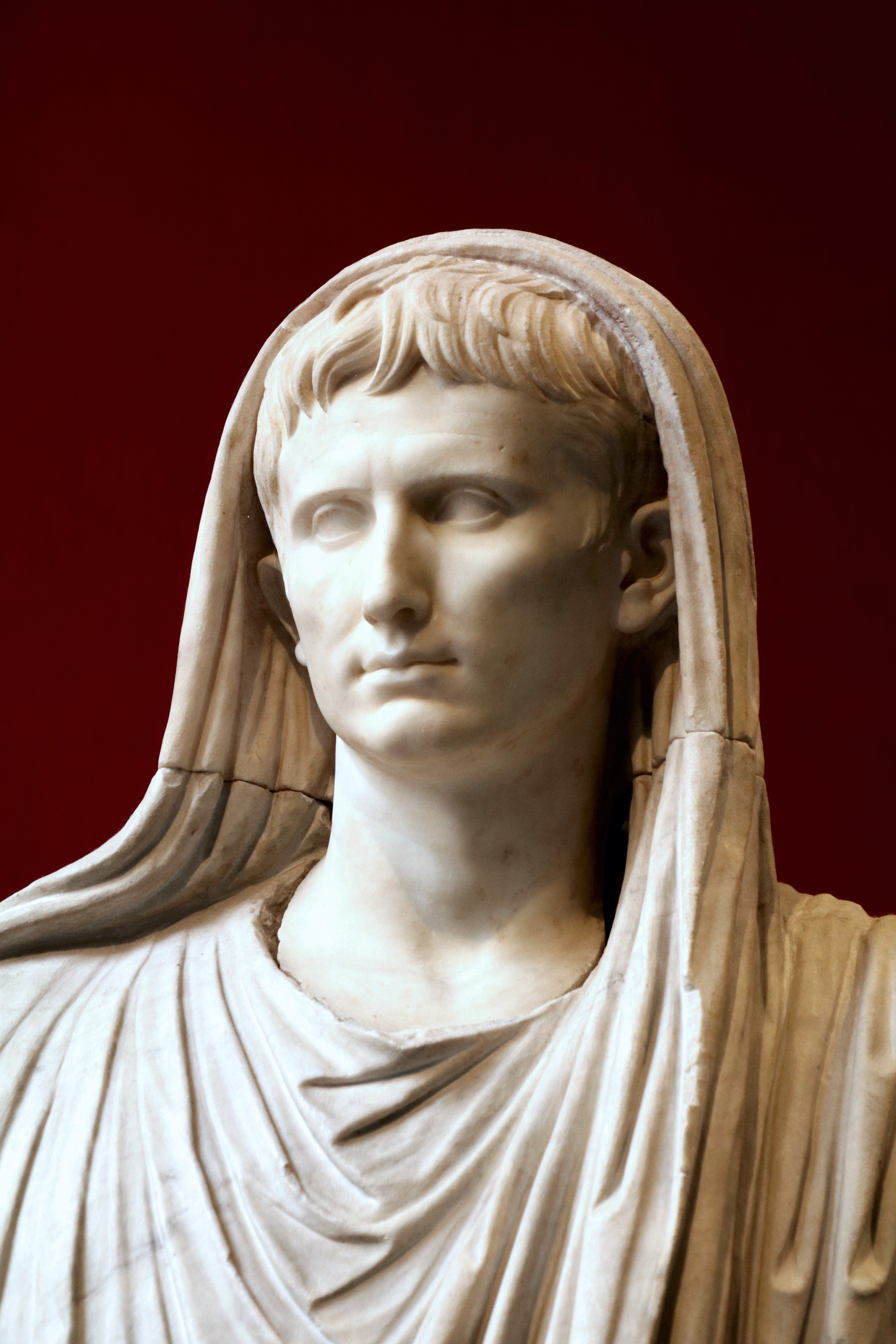
Portrait of Augustus as pontifex maximus on the Via Labicana Augustus sculpture, a Roman artwork of the late Augustan period, last decade of the 1st century BC

The second settlement was announced in 23 BC, in the wake of Augustus' ill health. Aware that his holding of the consulship inhibited his powers of patronage and may have created resentment among Rome's rising political stars (he had maintained the powerful leadership position for the last ten years), Augustus gave up the position of consul completely. However, where power was concerned, the compensation he received was more than adequate:

- Whilst not literally being a consul, he maintained the right to a seat on the consuls' platform at the front of the Curia.
- He was awarded ius primae relationis, the right to speak first in a Senate meeting.
- He was assured the right to summon a meeting of the Senate, a useful tool for policy-making and upholding the res publica illusion.

Instead of relying on the powers of the consulship which he gave up, he instead relied on the tribunicia potestas, or tribunician power, which enabled him to:

1. propose laws to the Senate whenever he wanted.
2. veto any laws he wanted.
3. grant amnesty to any citizen accused of crime.

Whilst effectively giving Augustus legislative supremacy, the honour of tribunician power had popular connotations, harking back to the traditions of the republic, and was thus not offensive to the aristocracy. As well as leader of the Senate, Augustus was now guardian of the freedom and welfare of the Roman people.

Beyond Rome, Augustus was granted a form of greater proconsular imperium. Along with governing his own provinces and armies, this position meant that he could effectively override the orders of any other provincial governor in the Roman Empire, which, as the Edicts of Cyrene indicate, he was quite prepared to do.

Normally during republican times, the powers Augustus held even after the Second Settlement would have been split between several people, who would each exercise them with the assistance of a colleague and for a specific period of time. Augustus held them all at once by himself, and with no time limits; even those that nominally had time limits were automatically renewed whenever they lapsed.

== Additional powers ==
These reforms also meant that credit was given to Augustus for each subsequent Roman military victory after this time, because the majority of Rome's armies were stationed in imperial provinces commanded by Augustus through the legatus who were deputies of the princeps in the provinces. Moreover, if a battle was fought in a senatorial province, Augustus's proconsular imperium maius allowed him to take command of (or credit for) any major military victory. This meant that Augustus was the only individual able to receive a triumph, a tradition that began with Romulus, Rome's first King and first triumphant general. Lucius Cornelius Balbus was the last man outside Augustus's family to receive this award, in 19 BC. Tiberius, Augustus's eldest stepson by Livia, was the only other general to receive a triumph for victories in Germania in 7 BC.

In 19 BC, the Senate granted Augustus a form of general consular imperium, which was probably imperium consulare maius, like the proconsular powers that he received in 23 BC. Like his tribune authority, the consular powers were another instance of gaining power from offices that he did not actually hold. In addition, Augustus was allowed to wear the consul's insignia in public and before the Senate, as well as to sit in the symbolic chair between the two consuls and hold the fasces, an emblem of consular authority.

On 6 March 12 BC, after the death of Lepidus, he additionally took up the position of pontifex maximus, the high priest of the College of Pontiffs, the most important position in Roman religion. (Note: The date is provided by inscribed calendars.) (Note: Dio reports this under 13 BC, probably as the year in which Lepidus died) On 5 February 2 BC, Augustus was also given the title pater patriae, or "father of the country".

== See also ==
- History of the Constitution of the Roman Republic
- Constitution of the Roman Kingdom
- Constitution of the Roman Empire
- Constitution of the Late Roman Empire
