= Roman emperor =

Ruler of the Roman Empire

Emperor of the Roman Empire
- Imperial
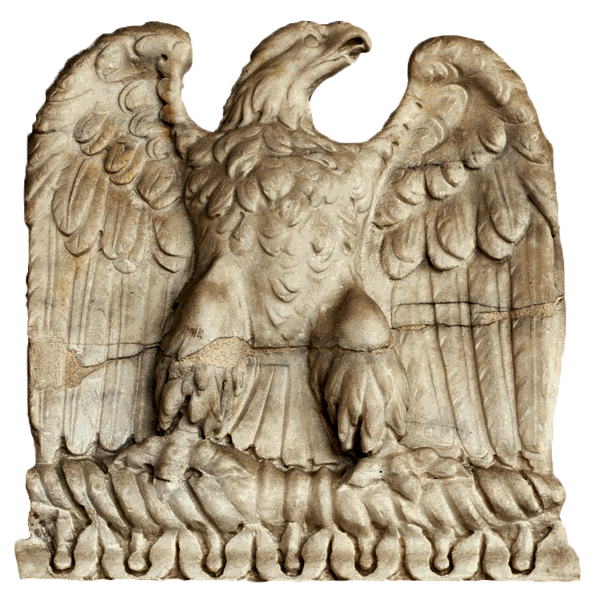
- Imperial aquila

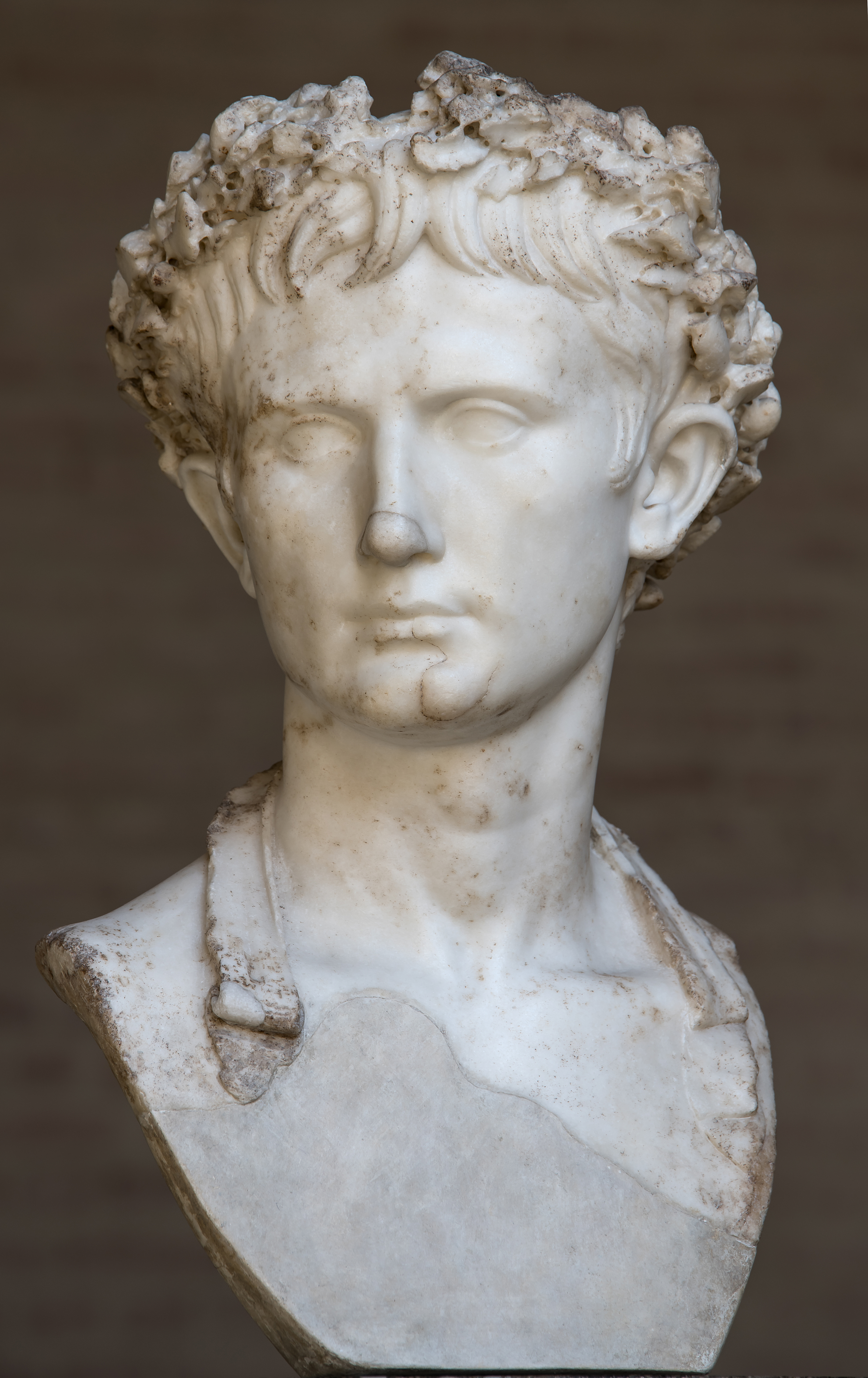
- Bust of Augustus wearing the corona civica

Details
- Style: Imperator, Caesar, Augustus, Princeps, Dominus Noster, Autokrator or Basileus (depending on period)
- First monarch: Augustus
- Last monarch: Theodosius I (unified); Romulus Augustulus (Western) (Note: Although Romulus Augustulus (r. 475–476) is often regarded as the last Western emperor, his predecessor Julius Nepos continued to be recognized in the Eastern court as the legitimate ruler of the West.); Constantine XI (Eastern)
- Formed: 16 January 27 BC
- Abolished: 9 May 480 (Western); 29 May 1453 (Eastern)
- Appointer: Senate (official), Roman military

The Roman emperor was the ruler of the Roman Empire, starting with the granting of the title augustus to Octavian in 27 BC. The title of imperator, originally a military honorific, was usually used alongside caesar, originally a cognomen. When a given Roman is described as becoming emperor in English, it generally reflects his accession as augustus, and later as basileus. Early emperors also used the title princeps ("first one") alongside other Republican titles, notably consul and pontifex maximus.

The legitimacy of an emperor's rule depended on his control of the Roman army and recognition by the Senate; an emperor would normally be proclaimed by his troops, by the Senate, or both. The first emperors reigned alone; later emperors would sometimes rule with co-emperors to secure the succession or to divide the administration of the empire between them. The office of emperor was thought to be distinct from that of a rex ("king"). Augustus, the first emperor, resolutely refused recognition as a monarch. For the first three hundred years of Roman emperors, efforts were made to portray the emperors as leaders of the Republic, fearing any association with the kings who ruled Rome prior to the Republic.

From Diocletian, whose reformed tetrarchy divided the position into one emperor in the West and one in the East, emperors ruled in an openly monarchic style. Although succession was generally hereditary, it was only hereditary if there was a suitable candidate acceptable to the army and the bureaucracy, so the principle of automatic inheritance was not adopted, which often led to several claimants to the throne. Despite this, elements of the republican institutional framework (Senate, consuls, and magistrates) were preserved even after the end of the Western Empire.

Constantine the Great, the first Christian emperor, moved the capital from Rome to Constantinople, formerly known as Byzantium, in 330 AD. Roman emperors had always held high religious offices, and some early emperors were even worshiped as gods, at least following their death when they were said to have become divine. Under Constantine, there arose the specifically Christian idea that the emperor was God's chosen ruler on earth, a special protector and leader of the Christian Church, a position later termed Caesaropapism. In practice, an emperor's authority on Church matters was frequently subject to challenge. In the later period, although theoretically one empire, there were two emperors, one in the east and one in the west. The Western Roman Empire collapsed in the late 5th century after multiple invasions by Germanic barbarian tribes, with no recognized claimant to Emperor of the West remaining after the death of Julius Nepos in 480. Instead, the Eastern emperor Zeno proclaimed himself as the sole emperor of a theoretically undivided Roman Empire (although in practice he had no authority in the West). The subsequent Eastern emperors ruling from Constantinople styled themselves as "Basileus of the Romans" (Ancient Greek: βασιλεύς Ῥωμαίων, Basileus Romaíon) but are often referred to in modern scholarship as Byzantine emperors.

The papacy and Christianised Germanic kingdoms of the West acknowledged the Eastern emperors until the accession of Empress Irene in 797. After this, the papacy created a rival lineage of Roman emperors in western Europe, the Holy Roman Emperors, which ruled the Holy Roman Empire for most of the period between 800 and 1806. These emperors were never recognized in Constantinople and their coronations resulted in the medieval problem of two emperors. The last Eastern emperor was Constantine XI Palaiologos, who died during the Fall of Constantinople to the Ottoman Empire in 1453. After conquering the city, Ottoman sultans adopted the title "Caesar of the Romans" (kayser-i Rûm). A Byzantine group of claimant emperors existed in the Empire of Trebizond until its conquest by the Ottomans in 1461, although they have used a modified title since 1282.

== Background and beginning ==
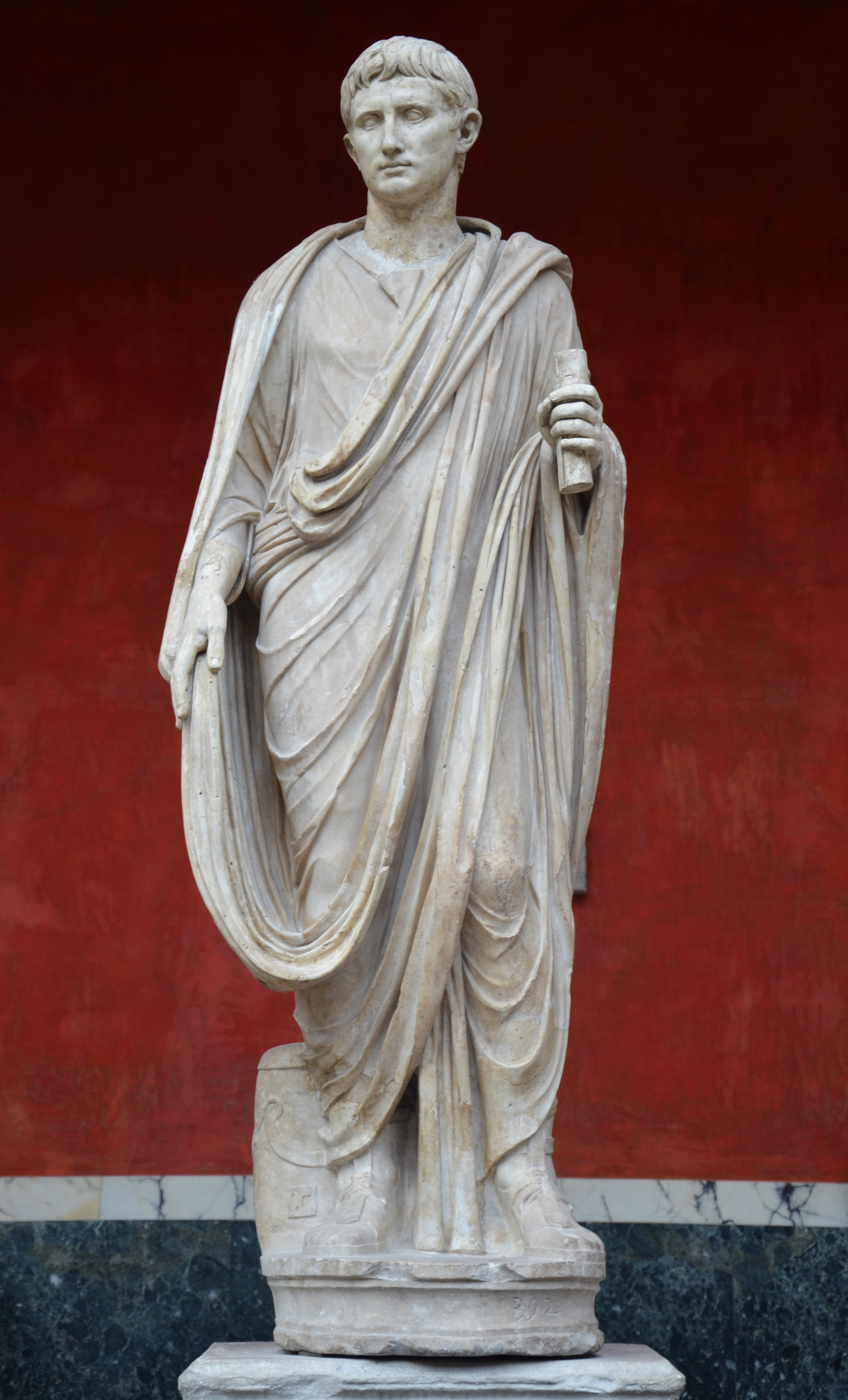
Augustus depicted as a magistrate at the Ny Carlsberg Glyptotek

Modern historians regard Augustus as the first emperor, whereas Julius Caesar is considered the last dictator of the Roman Republic, a view that is shared by the Roman writers Plutarch, Tacitus, and Cassius Dio. Conversely, the majority of Roman writers, including Pliny the Younger, Suetonius and Appian, as well as most of the ordinary people of the Empire, thought of Julius Caesar as the first emperor. Caesar did indeed rule the Roman state as an autocrat, but he failed to create a stable system to maintain himself in power. His rise to power was the result of a long and gradual decline in which the Republic fell under the influence of powerful generals such as Gaius Marius and Sulla.

At the end of the Republic no new or singular title indicated the individual who held supreme power. Insofar as emperor could be seen as the English translation of the Latin imperator, then Julius Caesar had been an emperor, like several Roman generals before him. Instead, by the end of the Caesar's civil wars, it became clear that there was certainly no consensus to return to the old-style monarchy, but that the period when several officials would fight one another had come to an end.

Julius Caesar, and then Augustus after him, accumulated offices and titles of the highest importance in the Republic, making the power attached to those offices permanent, and preventing anyone with similar aspirations from accumulating or maintaining power for themselves. Julius Caesar had been pontifex maximus since 64 BC; held the offices of consul and dictator five times since 59 BC, and was appointed dictator in perpetuity in 44 BC, shortly before his assassination. He had also become the de facto sole ruler of Rome in 48 BC, when he defeated his last opposition at the Battle of Pharsalus. His killers proclaimed themselves as the liberatores ("liberators") and the restorers of the Republic, but their rule was cut short by Caesar's supporters, who almost immediately established a new dictatorship.

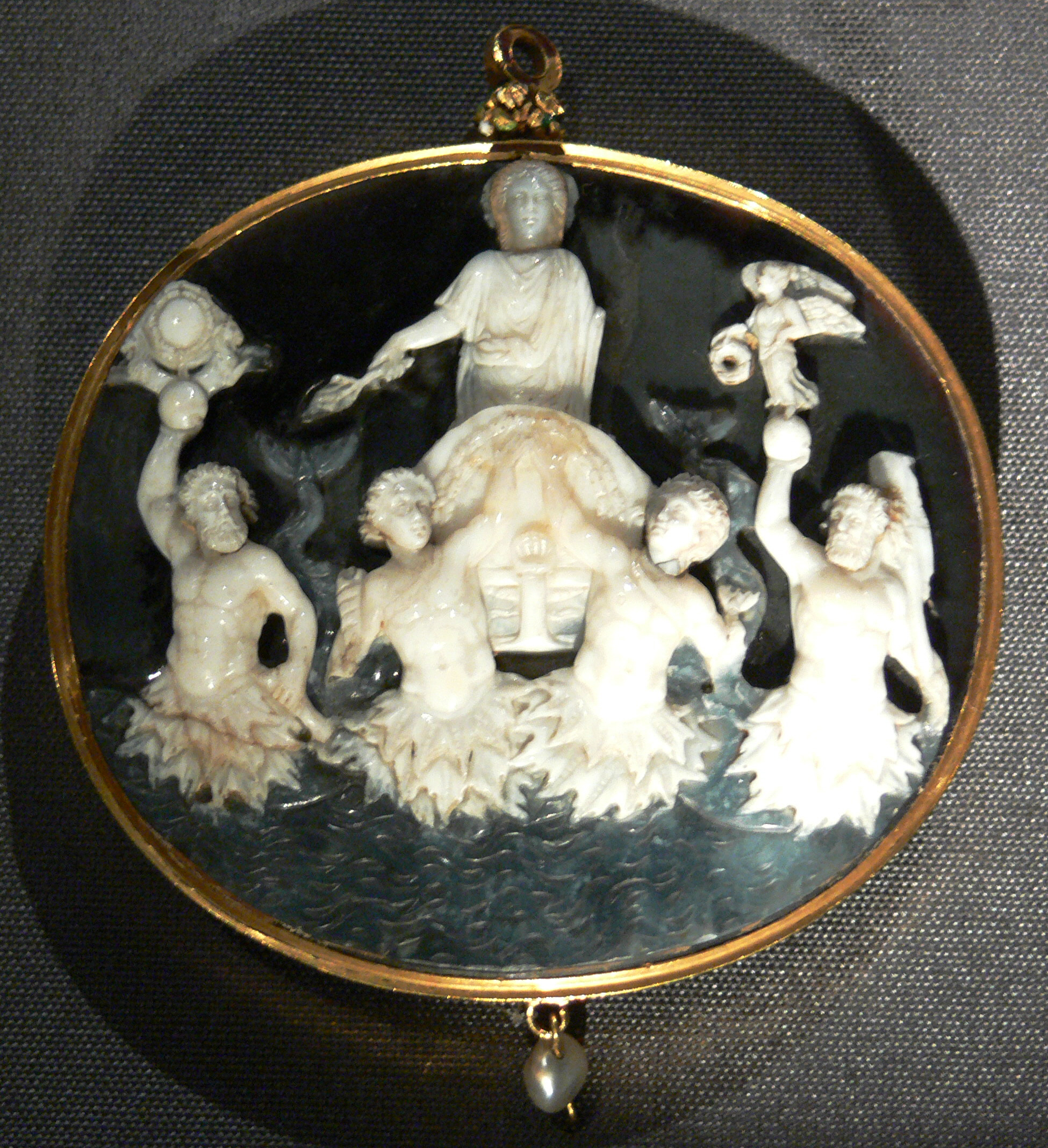
Cameo of Augustus in a quadriga drawn by tritons at the Kunsthistorisches Museum, Vienna

In his will, Caesar appointed his grandnephew Octavian as his heir and adopted son. He inherited his property and lineage, the loyalty of most of his allies, and – again through a formal process of senatorial consent – an increasing number of the titles and offices that had accrued to Caesar. In August 43 BC, following the death of both consuls of the year, Octavian marched to Rome and forced the Senate to elect him consul. He then formed the Second Triumvirate alongside Mark Antony and Lepidus, dividing the Roman world among them. Lepidus was sidelined in 36 BC, and relations between Octavian and Antony soon deteriorated. In September 31 BC, Octavian's victory at Actium put an end to any effective opposition and confirmed his supremacy over Rome.

In January 27 BC, Octavian and the Senate concluded the so-called "First settlement". Until then Octavian had been ruling the state with his powers as triumvir, even though the Triumvirate itself disappeared years earlier. He announced that he would return the power to the Senate and People of Rome, but this was only an act. The Senate confirmed Octavian as princeps, the "first among equals", and gave him control over almost all Roman provinces for a tenure of ten years. This limitation was only superficial, as he could renew his powers indefinitely. In addition, the Senate awarded him the appellation of augustus ("elevated"). The honorific itself held no legal meaning, but it denoted that Octavian (henceforth Augustus) now approached divinity, and its adoption by his successors made it the de facto main title of the emperor. He also received the civic crown alongside several other insignias in his honor. Augustus now held supreme and indisputable power, and even though he still received subsequent grants of powers, such as the granting of tribunicia potestas in 23 BC, these were only ratifications of the powers he already possessed.

Most modern historians use 27 BC as the start date of the Roman Empire. This is mostly a symbolic date, as the Republic had essentially disappeared many years earlier. Ancient writers often ignore the legal implications of Augustus' reforms and simply write that he "ruled" Rome following the murder of Caesar, or that he "ruled alone" after the death of Mark Antony. Most Romans thus simply saw the "emperor" as the individual that ruled the state, with no specific title or office attached to him.

Augustus actively prepared his adopted son Tiberius to be his successor and pleaded his case to the Senate for inheritance on merit. After Augustus' death in AD 14, the Senate confirmed Tiberius as princeps and proclaimed him as the new augustus. Tiberius had already received imperium maius and tribunicia potestas in AD 4, becoming legally equal to Augustus but still subordinate to him in practice. The "imperial office" was thus not truly defined until the accession of Caligula, when all of Tiberius' powers were automatically transferred to him as a single, abstract position that was symbolized by his sacred title of augustus.

== Powers under the Principate ==
The legal authority of the emperor derived from an extraordinary concentration of individual powers and offices that were extant in the Republic and developed under Augustus and later rulers, rather than from a new political office. Under the Republic, these powers would have been split between several people, who would each exercise them with the assistance of a colleague and for a specific period of time. Augustus held them all at once by himself, and with no time limits; even those that nominally had time limits were automatically renewed whenever they lapsed. The Republican offices endured and emperors were regularly elected to the most prominent of them: the consulship and censorship. This early period of the Empire is known as the "Principate", derived from the title princeps used by the early emperors.

The most important bases of the emperor's power were his supreme power of command (imperium maius) and tribunician power (tribunicia potestas) as personal qualities, separate from his public office. Originally, the powers of command were divided in consular imperium for Rome and proconsular imperium for the provinces. This division became obsolete in 19 BC when Augustus was given consular imperium – despite leaving the consulship in 23 BC – and thus control over all troops. This overwhelming power was referred to as imperium maius to indicate its superiority to other holders of imperium, such as the proconsuls of the few senatorial provinces and allies such as Agrippa. The governors appointed to the imperial provinces only answered to the emperor himself, who could maintain or replace them at will.

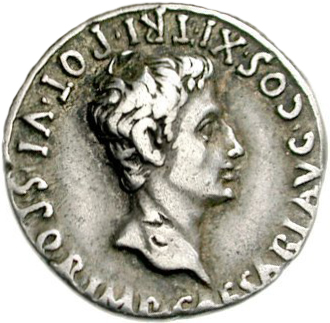
Denarius of Augustus (18 BC). (Note: The legend reads: spqr imp(erator) caesari aug(ustus) co(n)s(ul) xi tri(bunicia) pot(estas) vi; meaning "consul for the 11th time, [wielder of the] tribunician power for the 6th time".)

The tribunician power (tribunicia potestas), first assumed by Augustus in 23 BC, gave him authority over the tribune of the plebs without having to actually hold the office – a tribune was by definition a plebeian, whereas Augustus, although born into a plebeian family, had become a patrician when he was adopted into the gens Julia. By adopting the role of a tribune, Augustus was presenting himself as the representative of the common man and the protector of democracy. As always, this was not a sudden grant of power; Augustus had been receiving several powers related to the tribunes, such as sacrosanctity, since 36 BC. With these powers, he could veto any act or proposal of any magistrate, propose laws and convoke the Senate. His sacrosanctity also made him untouchable, and any offence against him could be treated as a crime of treason. The tribunician power was arguably the most stable and important of the emperor's powers. Despite being a perpetual title, it was always renewed each year, which often coincided with the beginning of a new regnal year (although "regnal years" were not officially adopted until Justinian I). (Note: For a further discussion of the tribunicia potestas and the role of the Senate, see: Rowe, Greg (2002). Princes and Political Cultures: The New Tiberian Senatorial Decrees. University of Michigan Press. pp. 41-66. ISBN 978-0-4721-1230-2.)

The office of censor was not fully absorbed into the imperial office until the reign of Domitian, who declared himself "perpetual censor" (censor perpetuus) in AD 85. Before this, the title had been only used by Claudius (47), Vespasian and Titus (both in 73).

The emperor also had power over religious affairs, which led to the creation of a worship cult. Augustus became pontifex maximus (the chief priest of the College of Pontiffs) in 12 BC, after the death of the former triumvir Lepidus. Emperors from the reign of Gratian (r. 375–383) onward used the style pontifex inclytus ("honorable pontiff"). The title of pontifex maximus was eventually adopted by the bishops of Rome during the Renaissance. The last known emperors to use the title were Valentinian III and Marcian, in the 5th century.

The only surviving document to directly refer to the emperor's power is the Lex de imperio Vespasiani, written shortly after Vespasian's formal accession in December 69. The text, of which only the second part survives, states that Vespasian is allowed to: make treaties; hold sessions and propose motions to the Senate; hold extraordinary sessions with legislative power; endorse candidates in elections; expand the pomerium; and use discretionary power whenever necessary. The text further states that he is "not bound by laws", and that any previous act was retroactively considered legitimate. There is no mention of imperium nor tribunicia potestas, although these powers were probably given in the earlier clauses. There is also no mention of any "imperial office", and the title of "emperor" is never used. The imperial titles are treated as inseparable of the person, which is reflected in the name Imperator Caesar Vespasianus Augustus. This Lex is sometimes related to the Lex regia ("royal law") mentioned in the Corpus Juris Civilis of Eastern emperor Justinian I (r. 527–565), who cites the early 3rd-century writer Ulpian. This was probably a later construct, as its very name, which derives from rex ("king"), would have been utterly rejected in the West. The Eastern Greek-speaking half of the Empire had always regarded the emperors as open monarchs (basileis), and called them as such.

== Succession and legitimacy ==
The weakest point of the Augustan institution was its lack of a clear succession system. Formally announcing a successor would have revealed Augustus as a monarch, so he and subsequent emperors opted to adopt their best candidates as their sons and heirs. Primogeniture was not relevant in the early Empire, although emperors still attempted to maintain a familiar connection between them; Tiberius, for example, married Julia the Elder, making him Augustus' son-in-law.

Vespasian, who took power after the collapse of the Julio-Claudian dynasty and the tumultuous Year of the Four Emperors, was the first emperor to openly declare his sons, Titus and Domitian, as his sole heirs, giving them the title of caesar. The Senate still exercised some power during this period, as evidenced by its decision to declare Nero a "public enemy", and influenced the succession of emperors. Following the murder of Domitian in AD 96, the Senate declared Nerva, one of their own, as the new emperor. His "dynasty", the Antonine, continued the adoptive system until the reign of Marcus Aurelius (r. 161–180). Marcus was the first emperor to rule alongside other emperors, first with his adoptive brother Lucius Verus, who succeeded jointly with him, and later with his son Commodus, who was proclaimed co-augustus in 177. (Note: There was, however, much precedent. The consulate of the Republic was a twin magistracy, and earlier emperors had often had a subordinate lieutenant with many imperial offices. Many emperors had planned a joint succession in the past – Augustus planned to leave Gaius and Lucius Caesar as joint emperors on his death; Tiberius wished to have Caligula and Tiberius Gemellus do so as well; as Claudius with Nero and Britannicus. All of these arrangements had ended in failure, either through premature death (Gaius and Lucius) or murder (Gemellus and Britannicus).)

Despite being the son of a previous emperor and having nominally shared government with him, Commodus's rule ended with his murder at the hands of his own soldiers. From his death in 192 until the 5th century, there was scarcely a single decade without succession conflicts and civil war. During this period, very few emperors died of natural causes. Such problems persisted in the later Eastern Empire, where emperors had to often appoint co-emperors to secure the throne. Despite often working as a hereditary monarchy, there was no law or single principle of succession.

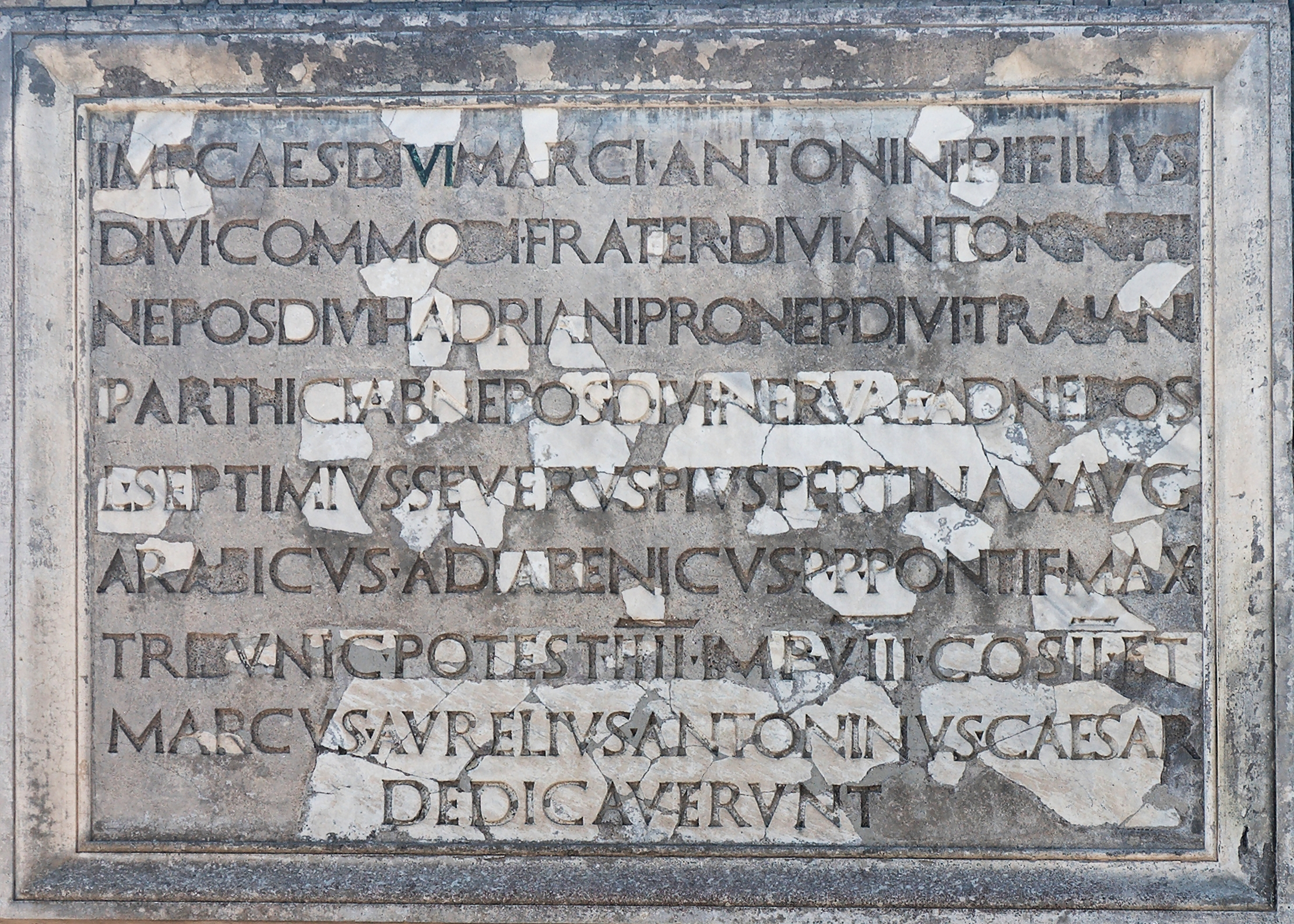
Latin inscription dedicated to Septimius Severus and Caracalla in Ostia Antica, AD 196. (Note: The text reads: IMP CAES DIVI MARCI ANTONINI PII FILIVS / DIVI COMMODI FRATER DIVI ANTONINI PII / NEPOS DIVI HADRIANI PRONEP DIVI TRAIANI / PARTHICI ABNEPOS DIVI NERVAE ADNEPOS / L SEPTIMIVS SEVERVS PIVS PERTINAX AVG / ARABICVS ADIABENICVS PP PONTIF MAX / TRIBVNIC POTEST IIII IMP VIII COS II ET / MARCVS AVRELIVS ANTONINVS CAESAR / DEDICAVERVNT. "Dedicated to Imperator Caesar, son of the divine Marcus Antoninus Pius, brother of the divine Commodus, grandson of the divine Antoninus Pius, great-grandson of the divine Hadrian, great-great grandson of the divine Trajan conqueror of Parthia, great-great-great-grandson of the divine Nerva, Lucius Septimius Severus Pius Pertinax Augustus, conqueror of Arabia and Adiabene, father of the fatherland, supreme priest, having the tribunician power for the fourth time, imperator for the eighth time, consul for the second time, and Marcus Aurelius Antoninus Caesar.")

Individuals who claimed imperial power "illegally" are referred to as "usurpers" in modern scholarship. Ancient historians refer to these rival emperors as "tyrants". In reality, there was no distinction between emperors and usurpers, as many emperors started as rebels and were retroactively recognized as legitimate. The Lex de imperio Vespasiani explicitly states that all of Vespasian's actions are considered legal even if they happened before his recognition by the Senate. Ultimately, "legitimacy was a post factum phenomenon." Theodor Mommsen famously argued that "here has probably never been a regime in which the notion of legitimacy is as absent as that of the Augustan principate". Imperial propaganda was often used to legitimize or de-legitimize certain emperors. The Chronicon Paschale, for example, describes Licinius as having been killed like "those who had briefly been usurpers before him". In reality, Licinius was the legitimate emperor of the West (having been appointed by Galerius), while Constantine was the real "usurper" (having been proclaimed by his troops).

There were no true objective legal criteria for being acclaimed emperor beyond acceptance by the Roman army, which was really the true basis of imperial power. Common methods used by emperors to assert claims of legitimacy, such as support of the army, blood connections (sometimes fictitious) to past emperors, distributing one's own coins or statues, and claims to pre-eminent virtue through propaganda, were pursued just as well by many usurpers as they were by legitimate emperors. Septimius Severus notably declared himself as the adoptive son of the long-deceased Marcus Aurelius, hence why he named Caracalla after him. Later Eastern imperial dynasties, such as the Doukai and Palaiologoi, claimed descent from Constantine the Great.

What turns a "usurper" into a "legitimate" emperor is typically that they managed to gain the recognition of a more senior, legitimate emperor, or that they managed to defeat a more senior, legitimate emperor and seize power. Modern historiography has not yet defined clear legitimacy criteria for emperors, resulting in some emperors being included or excluded from different lists. The year 193 has traditionally been called the "Year of the Five Emperors", but modern scholarship now identifies Clodius Albinus and Pescennius Niger as usurpers because they were not recognized by the Roman Senate. Recognition by the Senate is often used to determine the legitimacy of an emperor, but this criterion is not always followed. Maxentius is sometimes called an usurper because he did not have the recognition of Tetrarchs, but he held Rome for several years, and thus had the recognition of the Senate. Other "usurpers" controlled, if briefly, the city of Rome, such as Nepotianus and Priscus Attalus. In the East, the possession of Constantinople was the essential element of legitimacy, yet some figures such as Procopius are treated as usurpers. Rival emperors who later gained recognition are not always considered legitimate either; Vetranio had the formal recognition by Constantius II yet he is still often regarded as an usurper, similarly to Magnus Maximus, who was briefly recognized by Theodosius I. Western emperors such as Magnentius, Eugenius and Magnus Maximus are sometimes called usurpers, but Romulus Augustulus is traditionally regarded as the last Western emperor, despite never receiving the recognition of the Eastern emperor Zeno.

== Later developments ==
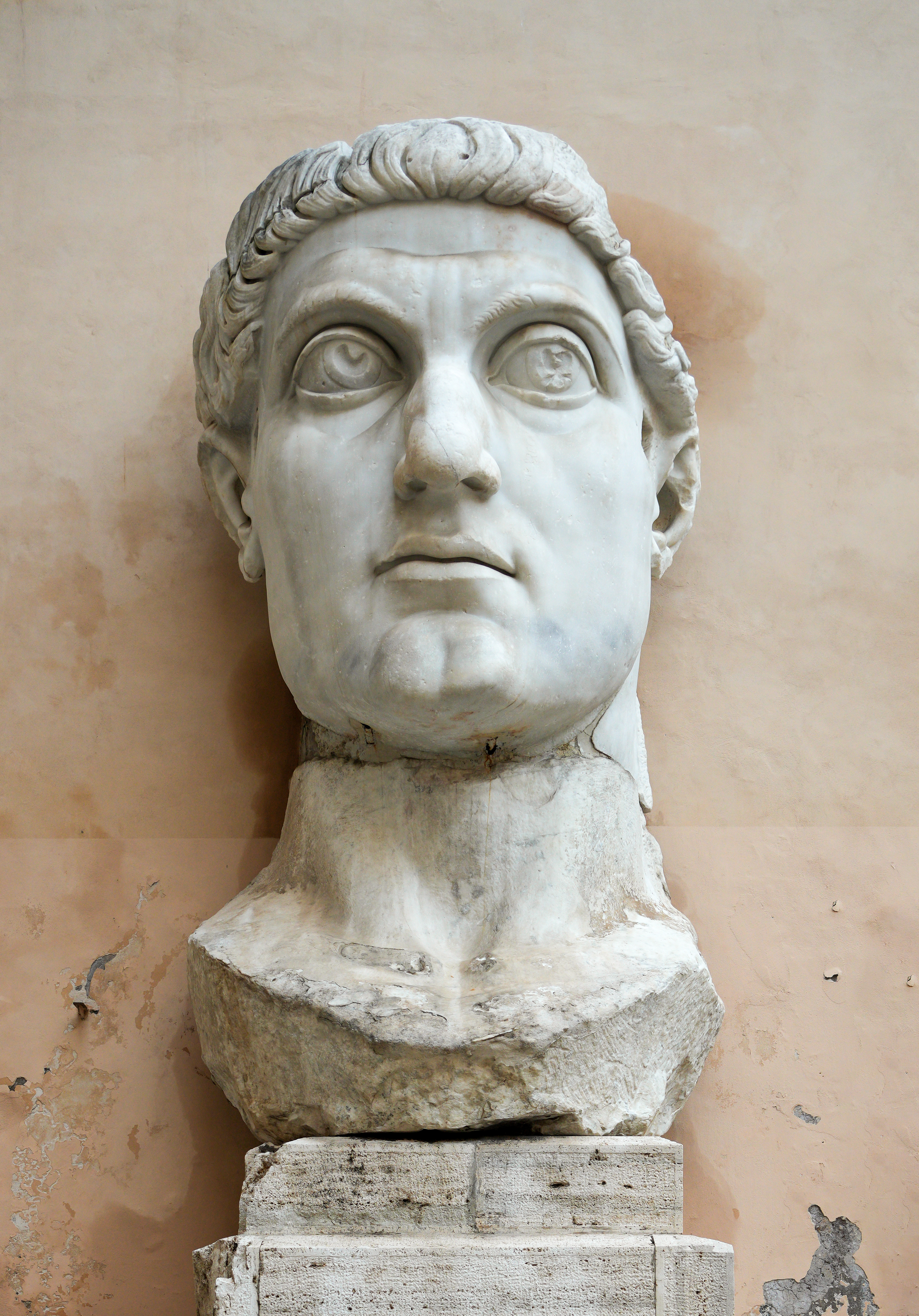
The Colossus of Constantine. Portraits after the Tetrarchy stopped including realistic features, as the emperor began to be seen as a symbol rather than an individual.

The period after the Principate is known as the Dominate, derived from the title dominus ("lord") adopted by Diocletian. During his rule, the emperor became an absolute ruler and the regime became even more monarchical. The emperors adopted the diadem crown as their supreme symbol of power, abandoning the subtleties of the early Empire.

Beginning in the late 2nd century, the Empire began to suffer a series of political and economic crises, partially because it had overexpanded so much. The Pax Romana ("Roman peace") is often said to have ended with the tyrannical reign of Commodus. His murder was followed by the accession of Septimius Severus, the victor of the Year of the Five Emperors. It was during his reign that the role of the army grew even more, and the emperors' power increasingly depended on it. The murder of his last relative, Severus Alexander, led to the Crisis of the Third Century (235–285), a 50-year period that almost saw the end of the Roman Empire. The last vestiges of Republicanism were lost in the ensuing anarchy. In 238, the Senate attempted to regain power by proclaiming Pupienus and Balbinus as their own emperors (the first time since Nerva). They managed to usurp power from Maximinus Thrax, but they were killed within two months. With the rise of the "soldier emperors", the city and Senate of Rome began to lose importance. Maximinus and Carus, for example, did not even set foot on the city. Carus' successors Carinus and Numerian, the last of the Crisis emperors, did not bother to assume the tribunicia potestas either.

After reuniting the Roman Empire in 285, Diocletian began a series of reforms to restore stability. Reaching back to the oldest traditions of job-sharing in the Republic, Diocletian established at the top of this new structure the Tetrarchy ("rule of four") in an attempt to provide for smoother succession and greater continuity of government. Under the Tetrarchy, Diocletian set in place a system of two emperors (augusti) and two subordinates that also served as heirs (caesares). When an emperor retired (as Diocletian and Maximian did in 305) or died, his caesar would succeed him and in turn appoint a new caesar. Each pair ruled over a half of the Empire, which led to the creation of a Western and Eastern Roman Empire, a division that eventually became permanent. Diocletian's division had precedents, in the joint rule of Valerian and Gallienus, and that of Carus and Carinus.

Diocletian justified his rule not by military power, but by claiming divine right. He imitated Oriental divine kingship and encouraged the reverence of the emperor, making anything related to him sacer (sacred). He declared himself Jovius, the son of Jupiter, and his partner Maximian was declared Herculius, son of Hercules. This divine claim was maintained after the rise of Christianity, as emperors regarded themselves as the chosen rulers of God.

The emperor no longer needed the Senate to ratify his powers, so he became the sole source of law. These new laws were no longer shared publicly and were often given directly to the praetorian prefects – originally the emperor's bodyguard, but now the head of the new praetorian prefectures – or with private officials. The emperor's personal court and administration traveled alongside him, which further made the Senate's role redundant. Consuls continued to be appointed each year, but by this point, it was an office often occupied by the emperor himself, (Note: Consuls still maintained some privileges during the later Empire, but at times it was only an honorary office. Some emperors gave the title to their children. For instance; Valentinian II assumed the consulate of 376 at the age of 5 and Honorius did the same in 386 at the age of 2.) who now had complete control over the bureaucratic apparatus. Diocletian did preserve some Republican traditions, such as the tribunicia potestas. The last known emperor to have used it was Anastasius I, at the start of the 6th century. Anastasius was also the last attested emperor to use the traditional titles of proconsul and pater patriae. The last attested emperor to use the title of consul was Constans II, who was also the last Eastern emperor to visit Rome. It's possible that later emperors also used it as an honorary title, as the office of consul was not abolished until 892, during the reign of Leo VI.

During the Dominate it became increasingly common for emperors to raise their children directly to augustus (emperor) instead of caesar (heir), probably because of the failure of the Tetrarchy. This practice had first been applied by Septimius Severus, who proclaimed his 10-year-old son Caracalla as augustus. He was followed by Macrinus, who did the same with his 9-year-old son Diadumenian, and several other emperors during the Crisis. This became even more common from the 4th century onwards. Gratian was proclaimed emperor at the age of 8, and his co-ruler and successor Valentinian II was proclaimed emperor at the age of 4. Many child emperors such as Philip II or Diadumenian never succeeded their fathers. These co-emperors all had the same honors as their senior counterpart, but they did not share the actual government, hence why junior co-emperors are usually not counted as real emperors by modern or ancient historians. There was no title to denote the "junior" emperor; writers used the vague terms of "second" or "little emperor". (Note: A mosaic in Italy shows Constantine IV (r. 668–686) alongside his co-emperors Heralius and Tiberius. Constantine is called maior imperator, Heraclius and Tiberius being only imperator.)

Despite having a successful reign himself, Diocletian's tetrarchic system collapsed as soon as he retired in 305. Constantine I, the son of tetrarch Constantius I, reunited the empire in 324 and imposed the principle of hereditary succession, which Diocletian intended to avoid. Constantine was also the first emperor to convert to Christianity, and emperors after him, especially after its officialization under Theodosius I, saw themselves as the protectors of the Church. The territorial divisions of the Tetrarchy were maintained, and for most of the following century the Empire was ruled by two senior emperors, one in the West (with Milan and later Ravenna as capital) and another in the East (with Constantinople as capital). (Note: Starting with Diocletian, almost every other emperor ruled alongside an equal or junior co-emperor. The only two emperors of this period to rule over the entire Roman Empire for their entire reign were Julian II and Jovian, both of which only ruled about a year. Valentinian I, who succeeded Jovian, immediately divided the empire between himself and his brother Valens. After this the empire was again reunited by Theodosius I, but he died only a few months later.)

This division became permanent on the death of Theodosius I in 395, when he was succeeded by his sons Honorius and Arcadius. The two halves of the Empire, while later functioning as de facto separate entities, were always considered and seen, legally and politically, as separate administrative divisions of a single, insoluble state by the Romans of the time.

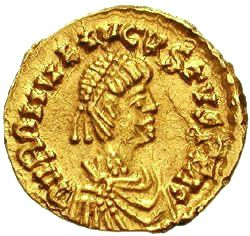
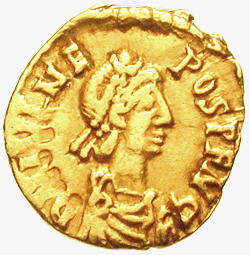
Roman coins (tremissis) of Romulus Augustulus and Julius Nepos, the last emperors of the Western Roman Empire.

In the West, the office of emperor soon degenerated into being little more than a puppet of Germanic generals such as Aetius and Ricimer; the last emperors of the West being known as the "shadow emperor". In 476, the Heruli Odoacer overthrew the child-emperor Romulus Augustulus, made himself king of Italy and shipped the imperial regalia to the Emperor Zeno in Constantinople. Historians mark this date as the date of the fall of the Western Roman Empire, although by this time there was no longer any "Empire" left, as its territory had reduced to Italy. Julius Nepos, who was overthrown and expelled to Dalmatia in favor of Romulus, continued to claim the title until his murder in 480. The Eastern court recognized this claim and Odoacer minted coins in his name, although he never managed to exercise real power. The death of Nepos left Zeno as the sole emperor of a (technically) reunited Roman Empire.

=== Byzantine period ===
The Roman Empire survived in the East for another 1000 years, but the marginalization of the former heartland of Italy to the empire had a profound cultural impact on the empire and its emperor, which adopted a more Hellenistic character. (Note: The Eastern Empire is often referred as the "Byzantine Empire" (from Byzantium, the original name of Constantinople) in modern scholarship, although it was still technically the same state of Antiquity. Their Greek-speaking inhabitants were called Romaioi (Ῥωμαῖοι), and were still considered Romans by themselves and the populations of Eastern Europe and the Near East, although they always had a more Greek-oriented culture because of the conquests of Alexander the Great. The Ottoman Turks still used the term "Rûm" (Rome) when referring to the Eastern Empire. After the fall of Empire, the Tsardom of Russia proclaimed Moscow as the "Third Rome", regarding Constantinople as the "Second Rome". The evolution of the church in the no-longer imperial city of Rome and the church in Constantinople also began to follow divergent paths, culminating in the schism of 1054 between the Roman Catholic and Eastern Orthodox faiths.)

The Eastern emperors continued to be recognized in the Western kingdoms until the accession of Irene (r. 797–802), the first empress regnant. The Italian heartland was recovered during the reign of Justinian I (r. 527–565), but this was reverted by the end of the century. Rome technically remained under imperial control, but was completely surrounded by the Lombards. Africa was lost to the Arabs in the early 7th century, and Rome eventually fell to the Lombards in 751, during the reign of Constantine V. The Frankish king Pepin the Short defeated them and received the favour of Pope Stephen II, who became the head of the Papal States. Pepin's son, Charlemagne, was crowned Imperator Romanorum (the first time Imperator was used as an actual regnal title) by Pope Leo III in Christmas AD 800, thus ending the recognition of the Eastern emperor. Western rulers also began referring to the Empire as the "Greek Empire", regarding themselves as the true successors of Rome.

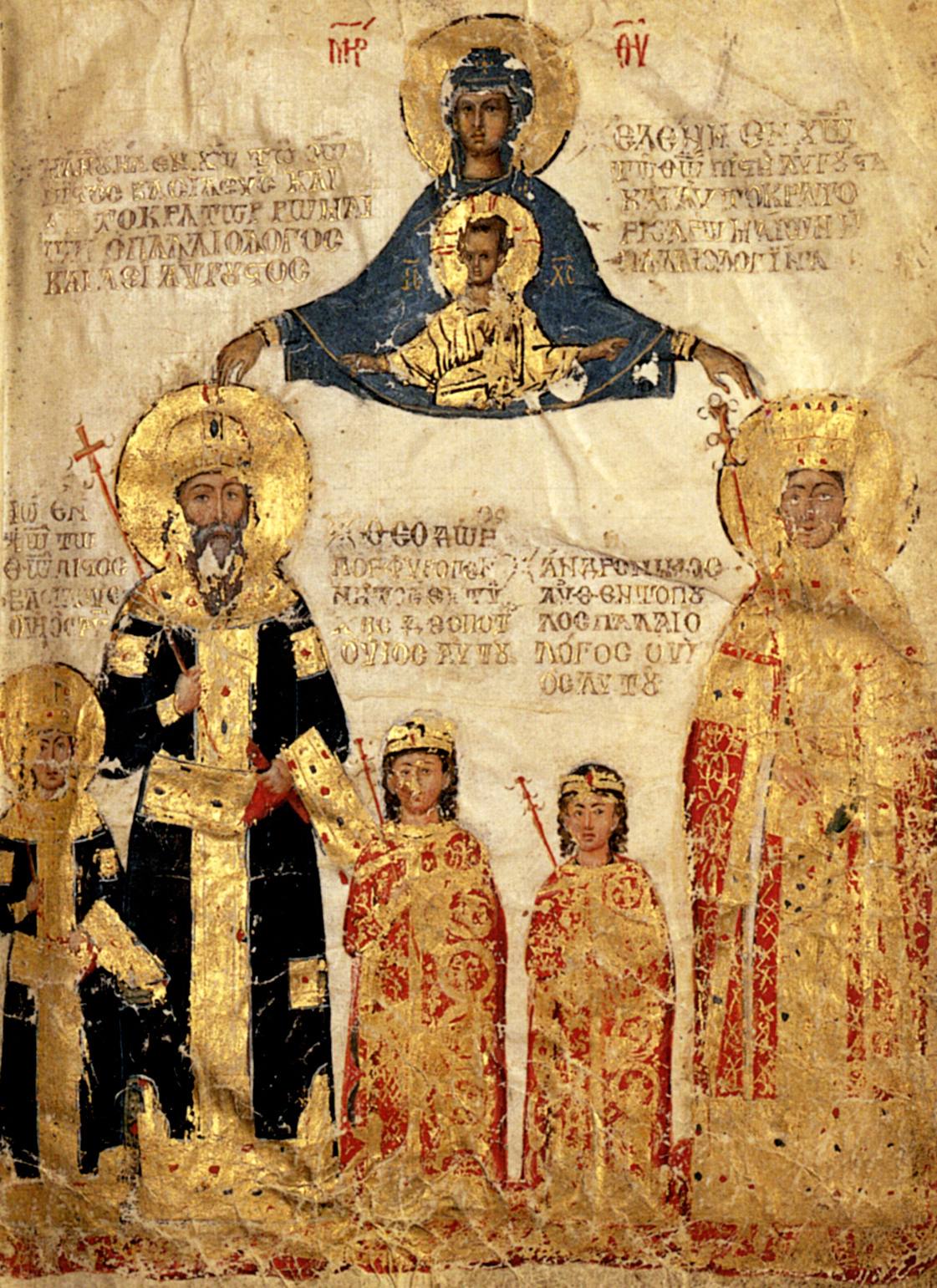
Miniature depicting Manuel II Palaiologos and his family, 1404. (Note: Manuel is referred as ΒΑϹΙΛΕΥϹ ΚΑΙ ΑΥΤΟΚΡΑΤΩΡ ΡΩΜΑΙΩΝ Ο ΠΑΛΑΙΟΛΟΓΟϹ ΚΑΙ ΑΕΙ ΑΥΓΟΥϹΤΟϹ ("basileus and autokrator of the Romans, Palaiologos, always augoustos"). His wife Helena Dragaš is referred as ΑΥΓΟΥϹΤΑ ΚΑΙ ΑΥΤΟΚΡΑΤΟΡΙϹΑ ΡΩΜΑΙΩΝ Η ΠΑΛΑΙΟΛΟΓΙΝΑ ("augusta and autokratora of the Romans, wise Palaiologina"); his son John VIII is called basileus, while Andronikos and Theodore are called despotes.)

The inhabitants of the Eastern half of the Empire always saw the emperor as an open monarch. Starting with Heraclius in 629, Roman emperors styled themselves "basileus", the traditional title for Greek monarchs used since the times of Alexander the Great. The title was used since the early days of the Empire and became the common imperial title by the 3rd century, but did not appear in official documents until the 7th century. Michael I Rangabe (r. 811–813) was the first emperor to actually use the title of "Roman emperor" (βασιλεύς Ῥωμαίων, Basileus Romaíon). This was a response to the new line of emperors created by Charlemagne – although he was recognized as basileus of the Franks. By the 9th century the full imperial title became "basileus and autokrator of the Romans", usually translated as "Emperor and Autocrat of the Romans". (Note: A variation of the title was later adopted by the Russian emperors, who styled themselves as "Emperor and Autocrat of All the Russias". In Russian, the title employs the title imperator (император) instead of the traditional tsar (царь), which had the same meaning.) The title autokrator was also used to distinguish a junior co-emperor (basileus) from his senior colleague (basileus autokrator). By the times of the Palaiologos, there were two distinct ceremonies for the accession of an emperor: first an acclamation as basileus, and later a coronation as autokrator (which also included being raised on a shield). These rites could happen years apart.

The Eastern Empire became not only an absolute monarchy but also a theocracy. According to George Ostrogorsky, "the absolute power of the Roman emperor was further increased with the advent of Christian ideas". This became more evident after the Muslim conquests of the 7th century, which gave Byzantine imperialism a new sense of purpose. The emperor was the subject of a series of rites and ceremonies, including a formal coronation performed by the Patriarch of Constantinople. The Byzantine state is often said to have followed a "Caesaropapist" model, where the emperor played the role of ruler and head of the Church, but there was often a clear distinction between political and secular power.

The line of Eastern emperors continued uninterrupted until the sack of Constantinople and the establishment of the Latin Empire in 1204. This led to the creation of three lines of emperors in exile: the emperors of Nicaea, the emperors of Trebizond, and the short-lived emperors of Thessalonica. The Nicean rulers have been traditionally regarded as the "legitimate" emperors of this period, as they recovered Constantinople and restored the Empire in 1261. (Note: This is reflected in the numbering used by scholars: John V Palaiologos is numbered after John III Vatatzes and John IV Laskaris, both emperors of Nicaea, but the other rival emperors are treated as entirely new lines of succession.) The Empire of Trebizond continued to exist for another 200 years, but from 1282 onwards its rulers used the modified title of "Emperor and Autocrat of all the East, the Iberians, and the Perateia", accepting the Niceans as the sole Roman emperors. However, the Byzantine Empire had been reduced mostly to Constantinople, and the rise of other powers such as Serbia and Bulgaria forced the Byzantines to recognize their rulers as basileus. Despite this, emperors continued to view themselves as the rulers of an "universal empire". During the last decades of the Empire, power was once again shared between multiple emperors and colleagues, each ruling from their own capital, notably during the long reign of John V. Constantinople finally fell to the Ottoman Turks in 1453; its last emperor, Constantine XI Palaiologos, died in battle. The last vestiges of the empire, Morea and Trebizond, fell in 1461.

=== Ottoman claim ===
Following the fall of Constantinople in 1453, the Ottoman Sultans beginning with Mehmed II claimed the Roman throne by right of conquest, taking great pains to represent themselves as the legitimate successors to the fallen Byzantine Empire, to some success. This effort reached its apogee during the reign of Suleyman the Magnificent, who integrated kayser-i Rûm (Caesar of Rome) into his full imperial title. This claim was disputed by some other European powers. Gradually, the Ottoman claim to the Roman throne decreased in importance as the Ottomans turned to cultivating Islamic legitimacy instead.

== Titles ==
=== Imperator ===
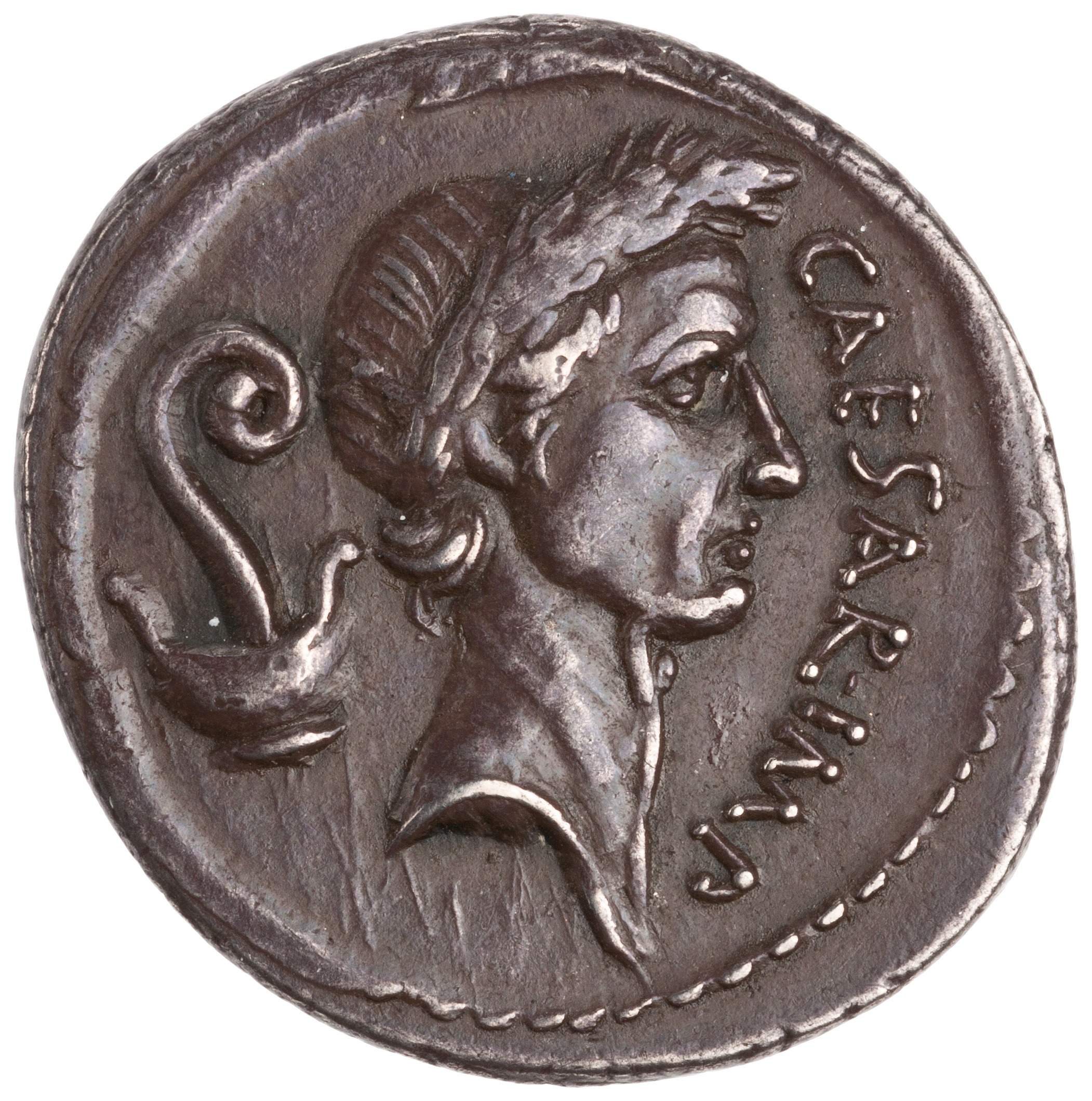
Denarius of Julius Caesar marked caesar imp(erator)

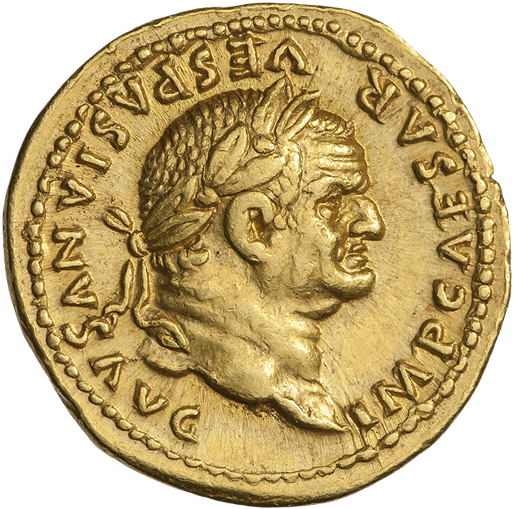
Aureus of Vespasian marked
imp(erator) caesar vespasianus aug(ustus)

The title imperator – from imperare, "to command" – dates back to the Roman Republic and was given to victorious commanders by their soldiers. They held imperium, that is, military authority. The Senate could then award the extraordinary honor of a triumph; the commander then retained the title until the end of his magistracy. In Roman tradition, the first triumph was that of Romulus, the founder of Rome, but the first attested use of imperator was in 189 BC, on the triumph of Aemilius Paulus. It was a title held with great pride: Pompey was hailed imperator more than once, as was Sulla and Julius Caesar. However, as noted by Cassius Dio, the meaning of the title changed under the new monarchy, and came to denote "the possession of the supreme power". Both Dio and Suetonius refer to Caesar as the first one to assume imperator as a proper name (a praenomen imperatoris), but this seems to be an anachronism. The last ordinary general to be awarded the title was Junius Blaesus in AD 22, after which it became a title reserved solely for the sovereign.

Augustus used Imperator instead of his first name (praenomen), becoming Imperator Caesar instead of Caesar Imperator. From this the title slowly became a synonym of the office, hence the word "emperor". Tiberius, Caligula and Claudius avoided using the title, but it is recorded that Caligula was hailed imperator by the Senate on his accession, indicating that it was already considered an integral part of the dignity. It was not until the late reign of Nero, in AD 66, that imperator became once more part of the emperor's nomenclature. Virtually all emperors after him used the praenomen imperatoris, with only a few variations under his successors Galba and Vitellius. The original meaning of the title continued to be used for a time, with emperors registering the number of times they were hailed imperator. The title became the main appellation of the ruler by the time of Vespasian.

After the Tetrarchy, emperors began to be addressed as dominus noster ("our Lord"), although imperator continued to be used. The appellation of dominus was known and rejected by Augustus, but ordinary men of the Empire used it regularly. It began to used in official context starting with Septimius Severus, and was first officially adopted in coinage by Aurelian.

In the East, imperator was translated as autokrator ("self-ruler"), a title that continued to be used until the end of the Empire. This is the modern Greek word for "emperor" (αυτοκράτορας). There are still some instances of imperator in official documents as late as the 9th century. Its last known use was on 866–867 coins of Michael III and his co-emperor Basil I, who are addressed as imperator and rex respectively. In the West, imperator was transformed into a monarchical title by Charlemagne, becoming the official Latin title of the Holy Roman Empire.

=== Caesar ===
Originally the cognomen (third name) of the dictator Gaius Julius Caesar, which was then inherited by Augustus and his relatives. Augustus used it as a family name (nomen), styling himself as Imp. Caesar instead of Imp. Julius Caesar. However, the nomen was still inherited by women (such as Julia the Younger) and appear in some inscriptions. After the death of Caligula, Augustus' great-grandson, his uncle Claudius was proclaimed emperor. He was not an official member of the Julia gens, but he was the grandson of Octavia, Augustus' sister, and thus still part of the family.

Following the suicide of Nero, the last descendant of Caesar, the new emperor Galba adopted the name of Servius Galba Caesar Augustus, thus making it part of the imperial title. Five days before his murder he adopted Piso Licinianus as his son and heir, renaming him as Servius Sulpicius Galba Caesar. After this Caesar came to denote the heir apparent, who would add the name to his own as heir and retain it upon accession as augustus. The only emperor not to assume it was Vitellius, who adopted the name Germanicus instead. Most emperors used it as their nomen – with Imperator as their praenomen – until the reign of Antoninus Pius, when it permanently became part of the formula Imperator Caesar [full name] Augustus. In the 3rd century, caesars also received the honorific of nobilissimus ("most noble"), which later evolved into a separate title.

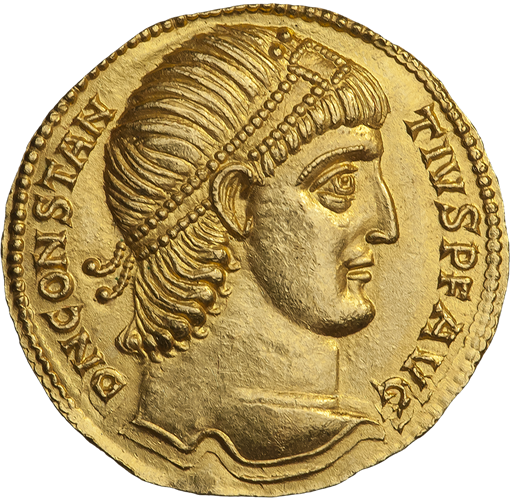
Coin of Constantius II marked: d(ominus) n(oster) constantius p(ius) f(elix) aug(ustus)

During the Tetrarchy the powers of the caesar increased considerably, but following the accession of Constantine I it once more remained as a title for heirs with no significant power attached to it. The title slowly lost importance in the following decades, as emperors started to promote their sons directly to augustus. In the East, the title finally lost its imperial character in 705, when Justinian II awarded it to Tervel of Bulgaria. (Note: Kaisar was originally a common way of referring to the emperor in the East. By the 6th-century, however, writers considered it to be a lower title than basileus.) After this it became a court title bestowed to prominent figures of the government, and lost even more relevance after the creation of the title sebastokrator by Alexios I Komnenos. Despite this, its regular use by earlier emperors led to the name becoming synonym with "emperor" in certain regions. Several countries use Caesar as the origin of their word for "emperor", like Kaiser in Germany and Tsar in Bulgaria and Russia.

After the Constantinian dynasty, emperors followed Imperator Caesar with Flavius, which also began as a family name but was later incorporated into the emperor's titles, thus becoming Imperator Caesar Flavius. The last use of the formula, rendered as Autokrator Kaisar Flabios... Augoustos (Αὐτοκράτωρ καῖσαρ Φλάβιος αὐγουστος) in Ancient Greek, is in the Basilika of Leo VI the Wise (r. 886–912).

=== Augustus ===
Originally the main title of the emperor. According to Suetonius, it was "not merely a new title but a more honorable one, inasmuch as sacred places too, and those in which anything is consecrated by augural rites are called "august" (augusta), from the increase (auctus) in dignity". It was also connected to the religious practice of augury, which was itself linked to Rome's founding by Romulus, and to auctoritas, the authority based on prestige. The honorific was awarded as both a name and a title to Octavian in 27 BC and was inherited by all subsequent emperors, who placed it after their personal names. The only emperor to not immediately assume it was Vitellius, although he did use it after his recognition by the Senate. Later emperors ruled alongside one or several junior augusti who held de jure (but not de facto) equal constitutional power. (Note: Initially the number of co-emperors was often no more than one. Constantine I notably ruled alongside eight successive emperors of equal seniority (perhaps with the exception of Valerius Valens and Martinian).) Despite its use as the highest imperial title, it was generally not used to indicate the office of Emperor itself, as ordinary people and writers had become accustomed to Imperator.

In the East the title was initially translated as Sebastos, but the form Augoustos eventually became more common. Emperors after Heraclius styled themselves as Basileus, but Augoustos still remained in use in a lesser form up until the end of the Empire. In the West, the title was also used by Charlemagne and the subsequent Holy Roman Emperors as part of the formula Imperator Augustus. Both Eastern and Western rulers also used the style semper augustus ("forever augustus").

=== Princeps ===
The word princeps, meaning "first", was a republican term used to denote the leading member of the Senate, and it was used by the early emperors to emphasize the continuance of the Republic. The title had already been used by Pompey and Julius Caesar, among others. It was a purely honorific title with no attached duties or powers, hence why it was never used in official titulature. The title was the most preferred by Augustus as its use implies only "primacy" (is in the "first among equals"), as opposed to dominus, which implies dominance. It was the title used by early writers before the term imperator became popular. In his Res Gestae, Augustus explicitly refers to himself as the princeps senatus. The title was also sometimes given to heirs, in the form of princeps iuventutis ("first of the youth"), a term that continued to be used during the Tetrarchy.

In the era of Diocletian and beyond, princeps fell into disuse and was replaced with dominus ("lord"); the use of princeps and dominus broadly symbolizes the differences in the empire's government, giving rise to the era designations Principate and Dominate. The title is still found in some later sources, however. The poet Claudian, for example, describes Honorius as having been raised from "caesar" to "princeps" (instead of augustus). The title survived the fall of the Western Roman Empire, as it was used by rulers such as Theodoric the Great.

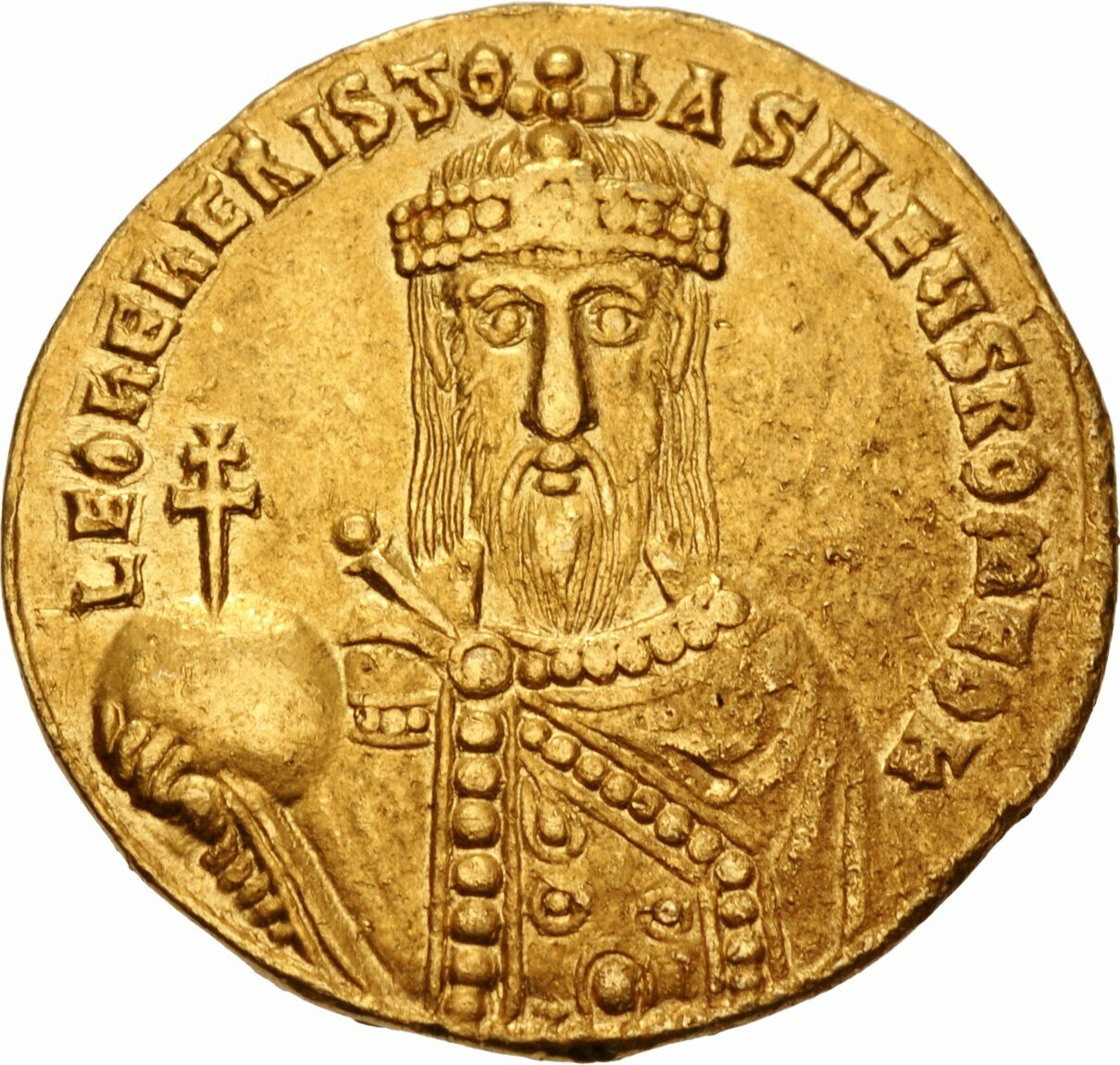
Coin of Leo VI (r. 886–912) marked: leon en cristo basileus romeon

=== Basileus and autokrator ===
Basileus was the traditional Greek title for monarchs. It was first used by Alexander the Great (r. 336–323 BC) during his conquests. The term was applied to emperors unofficially since the beginning of the Empire, but in official records it was often used as the Greek translation of the title rex, with autokrator (αὐτοκράτωρ, the Greek equivalent to Latin imperator) reserved for the emperor. As a result, Western writers often associated basileus with "king" as opposed to "emperor", despite this distinction not existing in Greek.

Basileus was first officially used by Heraclius in 629, after his victory over the Persians, and it became the main title of the emperor afterward. After the 9th century, the full imperial title became "basileus and autokrator of the Romans" (βασιλεύς καὶ αὐτοκράτωρ Ῥωμαίων), with autokrator distinguishing the senior emperor from the junior basileus. In later centuries, the title was shortened simply as "autokrator of the Romans", resulting in a revival of that title. In later centuries, an emperor would typically be acclaimed as basileus as an infant and then crowned by the Patriarch as autokrator. Foreign rulers were usually referred to as rhex (ῥήξ, a Greek rendition of Latin rex), but the Eastern emperors were eventually forced to recognize other monarchs as basileus, such as the Latin, Holy Roman, Serbian and Bulgarian emperors.

== Later assertions to the title ==
Despite overthrowing Roman rule, Odoacer never claimed the imperial dignity. His successor Theodoric the Great is sometimes said to have been an emperor in all but name, despite using the title of rex and recognizing the emperor in Constantinople. He also used the ancient title of princeps (in full, princeps Romanus) and dominus noster, actively trying to imitate the old emperors. (Note: There is one inscription (erected by a senator and not Theoderic himself) that calls him augustus, which may indicate that some of his subjects regarded him as an emperor. Procopius refers to him as a "genuine emperor" (basileus) despite being "in name an usurper" (tyrannos).) He even requested and received the regalia sent to Constantinople by Odoacer, although it appears that he only requested the purple robes and not the imperial crown nor scepter.

The rebels Burdunellus and Peter, both active shortly after the fall of the West, are referred to as "tyrants" in sources. This may imply that they claimed the imperial dignity, although there is almost no information available for these rebellions. The Berber governor Masties assumed the title of imperator shortly after 476, claiming to rule over the "Romans and Maurians." The last attempt to restore the office of emperor in the West was during the Siege of Ravenna (539–540), when the Goths offered Belisarius the throne, which he refused.

== Number of emperors ==
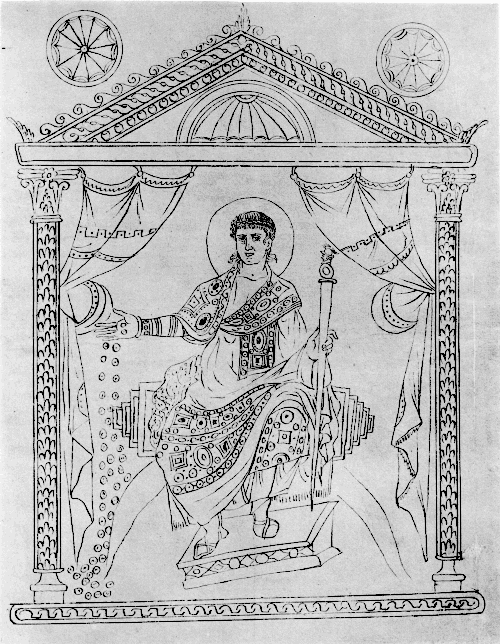
Portrait of Constantius II in Filocalus's Chronograph of 354

Several ancient writers tried to count the number of Roman emperors through history, but each of them gives a different count. The 4th-century historian Festus states that "From Octavian Caesar Augustus to Jovian, there were imperatores, 43 in number, through 407 years [reckoning from 43 BC]". The 6th-century Chronicon Paschale calls Diocletian the "33rd Roman emperor". Adding the eight other emperors mentioned in the work would give a total of 41 emperors up until Constantine I.

A few writers also attempted to make their own lists of emperors. The 4th-century calligrapher Filocalus, in his Chronographia, records 58 emperors from Augustus to Constantine. His contemporary Epiphanius records 44 emperors in his work On Weights and Measures. The 13th-century Chronicon Altinate records 46 emperors in the same time period. These discrepancies arise from the fact that there was never a defining distinction between "legitimate emperors" and "usurpers". Other emperors had such uneventful or brief reigns that they are unmentioned by literary sources, like Licinius's co-emperors Valerius Valens and Martinian.

== See also ==
- List of Roman emperors
- List of Roman empresses
- List of condemned Roman emperors
- List of Roman imperial victory titles
- List of Italian monarchs
- List of Roman usurpers
- Family tree of Roman emperors
- Roman imperial cult
- Roman usurper
