= Lex regia =

Lex regia is a Latin term meaning "royal law". It may refer to:

- Leges regiae, ancient laws of the kings of Rome
- Lex regia (imperial), the late Roman and medieval idea of a law transferring power from the Roman people to the emperor
- King's Law, also known as Lex Regia, the former constitution of Norway and Denmark
