= Lex regia (imperial) =

Roman Legal Concept

In the Roman Dominate and Latin jurisprudence down to the 18th century, the lex regia (literally, "royal law" or "royal act") was the supposed law by which unlimited imperium or authority had been transferred from the Roman people to the emperor. Emperor Justinian summarised the law in the decree by which he established the commission to compile the Digest in AD 530, Deo auctore: "By an ancient law [lege antiqua], which was called 'royal' [regia], all the authority and all the power of the Roman people were transferred to the power of the emperor." The concept originates somewhat earlier, however: Ulpian, in the early 3rd century, may already have referred to the law, though the meaning and even the authenticity of his use of the term are contested.

== Medieval and early modern reception ==
In the commentaries of the medieval glossators and postglossators, which took Justinian's Corpus Juris Civilis as their starting point, there was debate as to whether the lex regia had constituted a single, irrevocable act by which supreme power or sovereignty had been permanently alienated from the people to the emperor. It was the standard view of early glossators such as Irnerius that the transfer of power had been permanent and irrevocable, and a similar conclusion was endorsed later on by Bartolus de Saxoferrato (1313–1357), who considered that the law had been sanctified by Jesus Christ and the pope as his vicar, and was thus no longer subject to human revocation. Paulus Castrensis (died 1441) concluded on the same basis that "nowadays the Roman people can do nothing in the empire".

At the turn of the 13th century, however, Azo of Bologna argued that the power delegated by the lex regia had always remained at the disposal of the Roman people: "My own view", he wrote, "is that the people never transferred this power except in such a way that they were at the same time able to retain it themselves." A similar view would be articulated by the Monarchomachs of the Reformation era: the Vindiciae contra tyrannos (1579) cited the lex regia to argue that the people had delegated their power only as a concession, and that as a corporate body (universitas) they remained superior to the king. By the 17th century, the lex regia could accordingly be interpreted by republicans such as John Milton as a proof of the emergent theory of popular sovereignty.

== Historicity ==
After the rediscovery of the inscribed lex de imperio Vespasiani in the 14th century by Cola di Rienzo, the lex regia was often identified with the lex curiata de imperio, a type of law that empowered higher Roman magistrates—Jean Bodin, indeed, believed that the Vespasianic law was itself the lex regia that permanently established the imperial office. Yet the lex de imperio Vespasiani did not purport to confer upon Vespasian unlimited, monarchical authority, and the term regia itself would have been unusual in the constitutional context of the Principate, which was not officially a monarchy. Modern scholars thus reject the historical existence of a lex regia in the form discussed by Justinian and later civilians, considering it a late Roman invention intended to explain the transition from a republican to monarchical form of government.
