= Dominus noster =

Roman imperial style

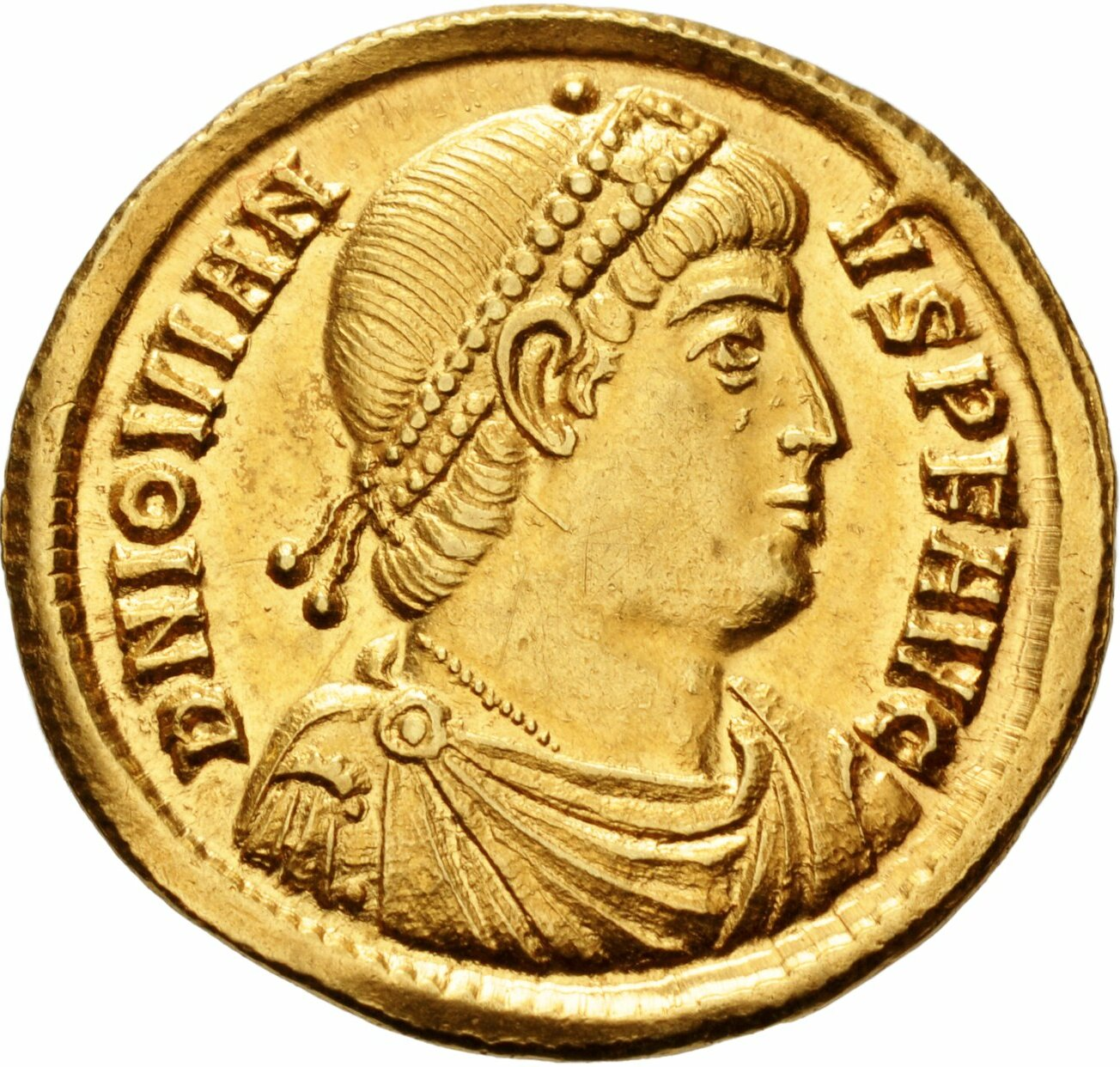
Coin of Emperor Jovian (r. 363–364), with the legend dn iovianus pf aug

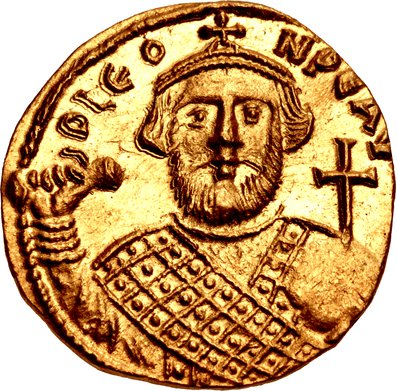
Coin of Emperor Leontius (r. 695–698), with the legend dn leon pe av

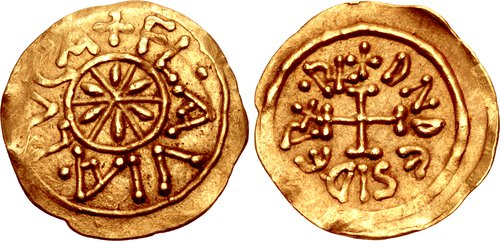
Coin of Desiderius of the Lombard Kingdom (r. 756–774), with the legend dn desider rex

The term dominus noster (Latin for "our lord") represents an imperial style used in the Roman Empire during late antiquity. It became formalized under Diocletian and the Dominate, appearing on coinage, inscriptions, and in imperial law.

Dominus noster, often abbreviated as DN, continued to appear on coins issued by Eastern Roman emperors until the eighth century, ceasing to be used systematically after 717 and disappearing by the end of that century. After the fall of the Western Empire, rulers of the barbarian kingdoms in the West also adopted the title to associate themselves with Roman authority, while acknowledging the continued supremacy of the Eastern emperors.

== History in the Roman Empire ==
Although forms of dominus ("lord") were used informally earlier, the phrase dominus noster came into regular use during the Crisis of the Third Century as emperors sought to emphasize their authority amid civil wars and external pressures. It was formalized under Diocletian (r. 284–305), whose reforms marked the transition from the Principate to the Dominate.

The style appeared widely in official contexts. On coinage, emperors were often identified as DN (dominus noster), a convention that continued into the fifth and sixth centuries. Inscriptions, papyri, and legal documents such as the Codex Theodosianus and the Codex Justinianus frequently employed dominus noster to designate the reigning emperor, underscoring his supreme legal and overarching sacral status.

== Use in the barbarian kingdoms ==
After the collapse of the Western Roman Empire, kings of the Ostrogoths, Visigoths, and Vandals adopted dominus noster in charters, laws, and diplomatic correspondence. The title functioned as a means of connecting their rule to Roman imperial tradition while distinguishing themselves from local aristocracies.

Barbarian kings often paired dominus noster with the praenomen Flavius, a name borne by most late Roman emperors. This titulature simultaneously asserted sovereignty and acknowledged subordination to the Eastern Roman Empire, who alone retained the title of imperator augustus.

Examples include the Ostrogothic king Theodoric the Great, whose chancery documents used dominus noster in parallel with imperial formulas, and Visigothic kings of the sixth and seventh centuries, who employed the style in legislative and diplomatic contexts.

In the Lombard kingdom of Italy, dominus noster continued to be used to the reign of the last Lombard king, Desiderius (r. 756–774). The style was also adopted by Charlemagne, Desiderius's successor as ruler of Italy, though it was largely restricted to coins and private charters in northern Italy and viewed as a continuation of local Lombard tradition. Dominus noster continued to see limited use by Charlemagne's successors, Louis the Pious and Lothair I, though other titles and styles were more common.

== Ethnicity and identity ==
Modern scholarship stresses that the adoption of *dominus noster* was not merely ceremonial but tied to broader questions of ethnicity and identity in the post-Roman West. Historian Andrew Gillett argues that titles, ethnonyms, and genealogies were flexible tools manipulated by rulers to establish legitimacy and authority, rather than fixed reflections of tribal realities. The usage of dominus noster thus both linked barbarian rulers to imperial models of rulership and helped articulate new political communities in the successor kingdoms.

== Legacy ==
The style dominus noster persisted into the early medieval period in diplomatic and ecclesiastical documents. Its usage foreshadowed the development of medieval royal titulature, where kingship was increasingly sacralized and expressed through lordship formulas. Scholars see this as part of the broader transformation of Roman political culture into medieval kingship.

== See also ==
- Dominate
- Barbarian kingdoms
- Imperial cult (ancient Rome)

== Bibliography ==
- Blackburn, Mark (1995). "Money and coinage". The New Cambridge Medieval History. Cambridge University Press. ISBN 978-0-521-36292-4.
- Garipzanov, Ildar H. (2008). The Symbolic Language of Royal Authority in the Carolingian World (c.751-877). BRILL. ISBN 978-90-04-16669-1.
- Gillett, Andrew (2002). On Barbarian Identity: Critical Approaches to Ethnicity in the Early Middle Ages. Studies in the Early Middle Ages. Vol. 4. Turnhout: Brepols. ISBN 2-50351-168-6.
- Grierson, Philip (1982). Byzantine Coins. University of California Press. ISBN 978-0-416-71360-2.
- Maas, Michael (2018). The Conqueror’s Gift: Roman Ethnography and the End of Antiquity. Berkeley: University of California Press. ISBN 978-0-69125-902-4.
- Wood, Ian (2018). The Transformation of the Roman West. Arc Humanities Press. ISBN 978-1-94240-143-8.
- Wood, Ian (2025). Europe in Late Antiquity. Oldenbourg Grundriss der Geschichte. Vol. 43. De Gruyter. ISBN 978-3-11035-264-1.
- Woolf, Greg (2011). Tales of the Barbarians: Ethnography and Empire in the Roman West. Malden, MA and Chichester: Wiley-Blackwell. ISBN 978-1-40516-073-5.
