= Lex curiata de imperio =

Law confirming the rights of Roman magistrates to hold power

In the constitution of ancient Rome, the lex curiata de imperio (plural leges curiatae) was the law confirming the rights of higher magistrates to hold power, or imperium. In theory, it was passed by the comitia curiata, which was also the source for leges curiatae pertaining to Roman adoption.

In the late Republic, historians and political theorists thought that the necessity of such a law dated to the Regal period, when kings after Romulus had to submit to ratification by the Roman people. Like many other aspects of Roman religion and law, the lex curiata was attributed to Numa Pompilius, Rome's second king. This origin seems to have been reconstructed after the fact to explain why the law was required, at a time when the original intent of the ceremony conferring imperium was no longer understood. The last two kings, however, were said to have ruled without such ratification, which at any rate may have been more loosely acclamation.

The law was passed in an assembly that during the late Republic existed in name only, the comitia curiata, based on the curiae. The curiae were supposed to have been the thirty political divisions created by Romulus and named after the Sabine women, who were from Cures in Sabine territory. These political units were replaced as early as 218 BC by lictors; the people no longer assembled, as each curia was represented by a lictor, and confirmation was virtually automatic, unless a tribune chose to obstruct. Even then, an unconfirmed magistrate might forge ahead with the functions of his office regardless. By the late Republic, a magistrate could simply dispense with this ratification in claiming his imperium, or a legislator could include a provision in a bill that rendered a curiate law redundant. The censors, by contrast, were confirmed by the comitia centuriata. It therefore becomes unclear what purpose the lex curiata continued to serve: "The origin, nature, and importance of the lex curiata de imperio have been extensively and inconclusively debated."

It has sometimes been supposed that the lex curiata is what conferred the right to take auspices, though scholars are not unanimous on this point. H.S. Versnel, in his study of the Roman triumph, argued that the lex curiata de imperio was a prerequisite for a commander before he could be awarded a triumph. Imperium, Versnel maintained, was not granted to a commander within a political framework, but was rather a quality within the man that manifests itself and is acknowledged ceremonially by a lex curiata de imperio. The lex was not fundamental to the holding of imperium or auspicium, but was rather the act through which the people expressed their recognition of that authority.

Even if the lex curiata became largely ceremonial, it retained enough force to be useful for political tactics when evoked. Tribunes could obstruct its passage; the consuls of 54 BC lacked the lex, and their legitimacy to govern as proconsuls was questioned; during the civil war, the consuls of 49 used their own lack of a lex as an excuse for not holding elections for their successors.

== Selected bibliography ==
- Lintott, Andrew. The Constitution of the Roman Republic. Oxford: Clarendon Press, 1999.
- Oakley, S.P. A Commentary on Livy, Books VI-X. Oxford University Press, 2005, vol. 3.
- Versnel, H. S. Triumphus: An Inquiry into the Origin, Development and Meaning of the Roman Triumph. Brill, 1970.

== See also ==
- Lex regia (imperial)
