= Barbarian kingdoms =

Kingdoms established by barbarian tribes in the former Western Roman Empire

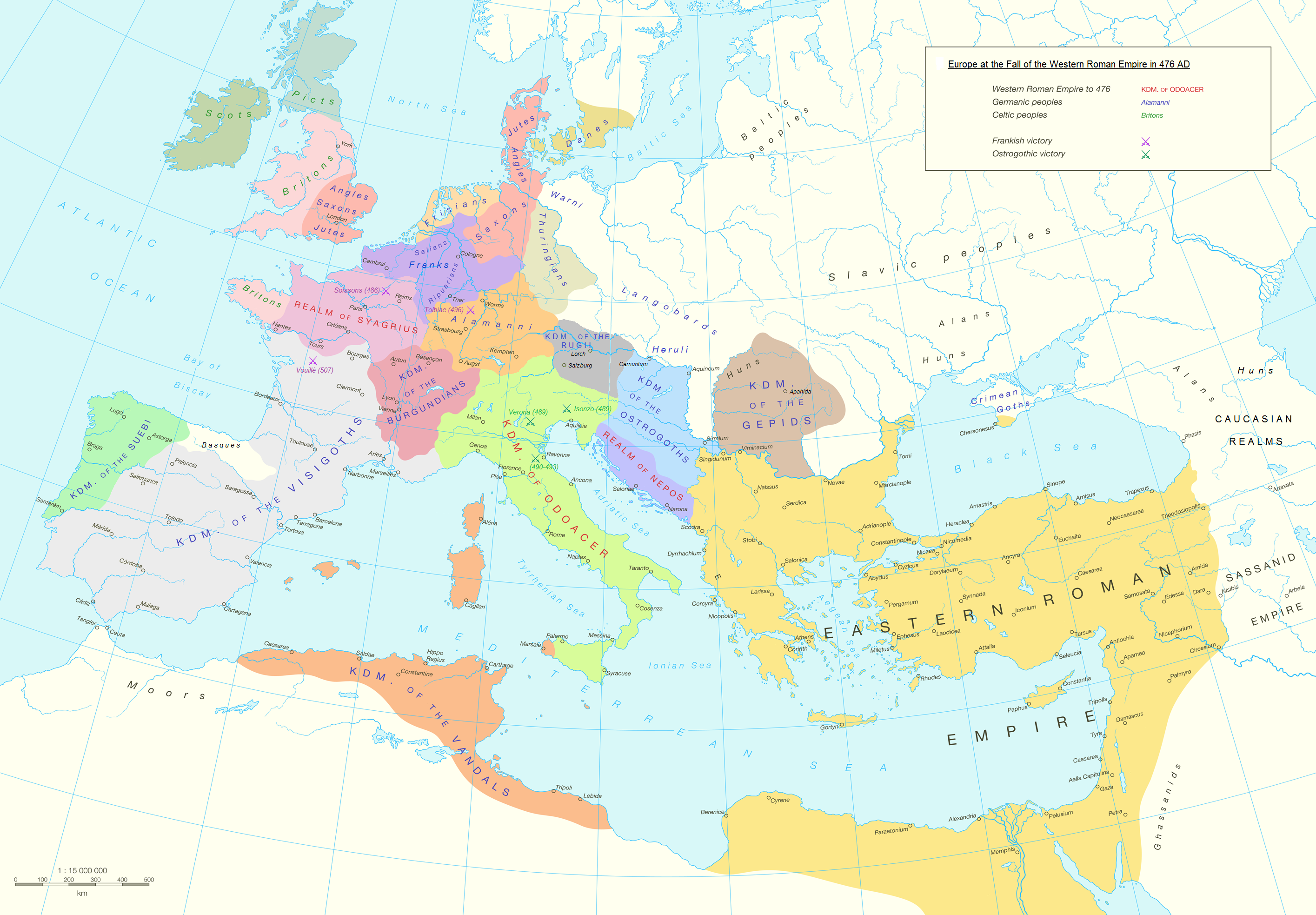
Political map of continental Europe, North Africa, and the Middle East in 476 CE, showing the remaining Eastern Roman Empire in the Eastern Mediterranean, and the new barbarian kingdoms in the former territories of the Western Roman Empire.

The barbarian kingdoms were states founded by various non-Roman, primarily Germanic, peoples in Western Europe and North Africa following the collapse of the Western Roman Empire in the 5th century CE. The barbarian kingdoms were the principal governments in Western Europe in Late Antiquity and the Early Middle Ages. The time of the barbarian kingdoms is considered to have come to an end with Charlemagne's coronation as emperor in 800, though a handful of small Anglo-Saxon kingdoms persisted until being unified by Alfred the Great in 886.

The most historically significant of the barbarian kingdoms include the Visigothic Kingdom in Hispania, the Frankish Kingdom in Gaul, the Ostrogothic Kingdom in Italy, the Lombard Kingdom in Italy, the Suevic Kingdom in Gallaecia, the Vandal Kingdom in Africa, and the Burgundian Kingdom in Sapaudia.

The formation of the barbarian kingdoms was a complicated, gradual, and largely unintentional process. Their origin can be traced to the Roman state failing to handle barbarian migrants on the imperial borders, which led to both invasions and invitations into imperial territory from the 3rd century onwards. Despite an increasing influx of barbarians, the Romans simultaneously denied them the ability to properly integrate into the imperial framework. Barbarian rulers were at first local warlords and client kings without firm connections to any territory. Their influence only increased as Roman emperors and usurpers began to use them as pawns in civil wars. The barbarian realms only transitioned into proper territorial kingdoms after the collapse of effective Western Roman central authority.

Barbarian kings established legitimacy through connecting themselves to the Roman Empire. Virtually all barbarian rulers assumed the style dominus noster ("our lord"), previously used by Roman emperors, and many adopted the praenomen Flavius, borne by nearly all Roman emperors in late antiquity. Most rulers also assumed a subordinate position in diplomacy with the remaining Eastern Roman Empire. Many aspects of the late Roman administration survived under barbarian rule, though the old system gradually dissolved and disappeared, a process accelerated by periods of political turmoil.

== Etymology ==
"The barbarian kingdoms" is the collective term commonly used by modern historians to designate the kingdoms established in Western Europe after the collapse of the Western Roman Empire. The term has been criticized by some scholars on account of "barbarian" being a pejorative term. Some historians also consider "barbarian kingdoms" to be a misnomer since the kingdoms were supported and to a large degree staffed by former Roman elites. Alternate terms that have been proposed and used by some historians include "post-Roman kingdoms", "Roman-barbarian kingdoms", "Latin-Germanic kingdoms", "Latin-barbarian kingdoms", "western kingdoms", and "early medieval kingdoms".

"Barbarian kingdom" was not a contemporary term and was not used by the populace of the kingdoms to designate their own states. Early medieval writers in the kingdoms sometimes used "barbarian" in reference to denizens of other kingdoms, though never in reference to their own.

== Formation ==
=== Background ===
The rise of the barbarian kingdoms in the territory previously governed by the Western Roman Empire was a gradual, complex, and largely unintentional process. Their origin can ultimately be traced to the migrations of large numbers of barbarian (i.e. non-Roman) peoples into the territory of the Roman Empire. Although the Migration Period (c. 300–600) is often referred to as the "Barbarian Invasions", migrations were spurred not only by invasions but also by invitations. Inviting peoples from beyond the imperial frontier to settle Roman territory was not a new policy, and something that had been done several times by emperors in the past, mostly for economic, agricultural or military purposes. Because of the size and power of the Roman Empire, its capacity for immigration was nearly infinite. Several events through the fourth and fifth centuries complicated the situation.

==== The Visigoths (376–410) ====
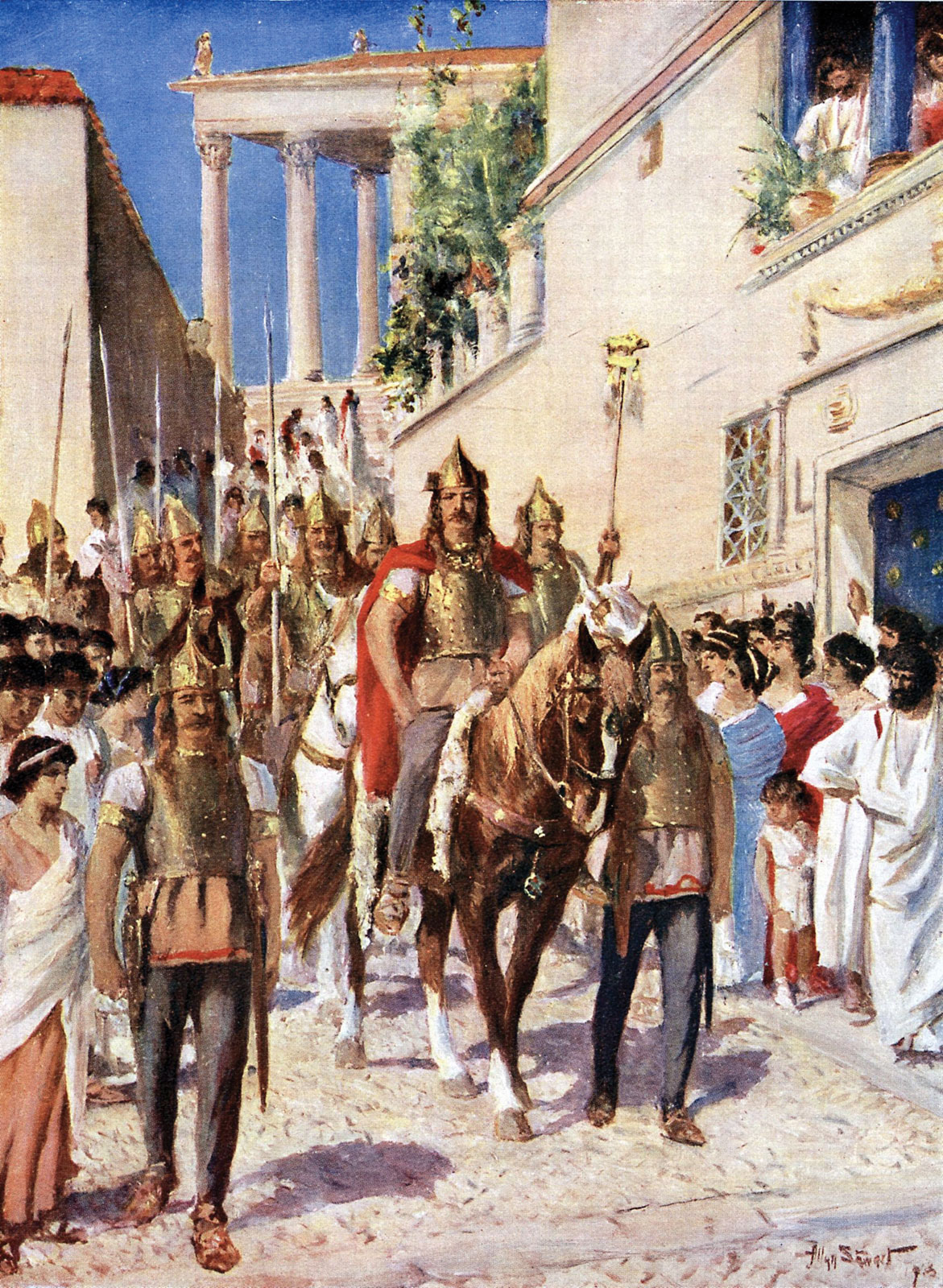
20th-century painting of Alaric I, leader of the Visigoths 395–410, entering Athens after capturing the city in 395

In 376, the Visigoths were allowed to cross the Danube river and settle in the Balkans by the government of the Eastern Roman Empire. The Visigoths, numbering perhaps 50,000 (out of which 10,000 were warriors), were refugees, fleeing from the Ostrogoths, who in turn were fleeing from the Huns. The Eastern emperor, Valens (r. 364–378), was pleased at the arrival of the Visigoths as it meant that he could recruit their warriors at low cost, bolstering his armies. Barbarian tribes seeking to settle in the empire were typically broken up into smaller groups and resettled across imperial territory. The Visigoths were however allowed to remain united and to themselves choose Thrace as their place of settlement. Although the Roman state was to provide the Visigoths with food, imperial logistics could not handle the large number of refugees and Roman officials under the command of Lupicinus worsened the crisis by selling off much of the food before it reached the Visigoths. Amid rampant starvation, some Visigoth families were forced to sell their children into Roman slavery for food. After Lupicinus had a group of high-ranking Visigoths killed, the situation erupted into a full-scale rebellion, later known as the Gothic War (376–382). In 378, the Visigoths inflicted a crippling defeat on the Eastern Roman field army in the Battle of Adrianople, in which Emperor Valens was also killed.

The defeat at Adrianople was a shock for the Romans, and forced them to negotiate with, and settle, the Visigoths within the imperial borders. The treaties at the conclusion of the Gothic war made the Visigoths semi-independent foederati under their own leaders, able to be called upon and drafted into the Roman army. Unlike previous settlements, the Visigoths were not dispersed and instead given cohesive lands in the provinces of Scythia, Moesia, and perhaps Macedonia. Although the defeat at Adrianople was disastrous, several modern historians have criticized the idea that it was a decisive step in the fall of the Western Roman Empire. Other than the Visigoths remaining a cohesive group, their eventual settlement was not much different from previous groups and they had been effectively pacified and contained by the early 380s.

Roman civil wars in the late 4th century, as well as periods of cold war between the imperial courts of the Western and Eastern Roman empires, allowed the Visigoths under their leader Alaric I (r. 395–410) to become an active force in imperial politics, only tenuously linked to the imperial government itself. Both Visigoths and Romans were aware that Gothic autonomy had only been accepted because there were few alternatives and repeated Gothic casualties in Roman wars likely made the Visigoths increasingly suspicious of Roman motives. In this context, the Visigoths revolted several times under Alaric, who sought to attain a formal position in the imperial framework as a Roman general, as well as pay for his followers as Roman soldiers. Alaric was repeatedly caught in the rivalry and court intrigue between the Eastern and Western empires and his failure to obtain formal recognition eventually led to his forces sacking Rome in 410.

==== Breakdown in Gaul and Britannia (388–411) ====
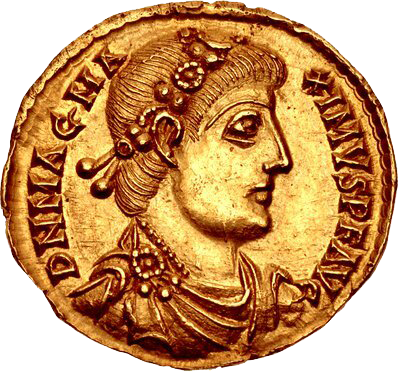
Coin of Magnus Maximus (r. 383–388) the last Roman emperor to be significantly active in Britannia and northern Gaul

Roman civil wars in the late fourth century were disastrous for the defense of the Western Roman Empire. In 388, the eastern emperor Theodosius I (r. 379–395) defeated the western usurper-emperor Magnus Maximus (r. 383–388). In 394, Theodosius's troops again defeated a western rival, Eugenius (r. 392–394). Both conflicts meant large slaughters of Western Roman regiments. After Magnus Maximus, no significant western emperor ever traveled north of Lyon and there appears to have been very little real imperial activity in Britannia or northern Gaul. In many ways, the Roman Empire ceased to make itself felt in the region; local offices were withdrawn to southern Gaul, aristocrats fled south, and the local capital was moved in 395 from Trier to Arles. Archaeological evidence from Britannia and northern Gaul showcase a rapid collapse of Roman industries, villa life, and Roman civilization as a whole. The effective border of imperial control moved from the Rhine frontier to the Loire.

Between 405 and 407, a large number of barbarians invaded Gaul in what is called the crossing of the Rhine, including the Alans, Vandals, and Suebi. These groups were not from the kingdoms immediately adjacent to Roman Gaul; instead they had likely been heavily dependent on Roman gifts and were provoked to journey west as such gifts stopped and the Huns arrived in the east. The barbarians quickly overwhelmed what remained of the Roman defensive works in the region and led Roman forces in Britain to acclaim the usurper-emperor Constantine III (r. 407–411).

Constantine III managed to keep the barbarians on the Rhine somewhat in check. The end of his reign due to further internal Roman conflict left the armies in Gaul in tatters and led to the tribes being able to penetrate deep into Gaul and Hispania. Without sufficient military force and with administration impossible, the imperial government effectively abandoned Britannia and northern Gaul around 410. In Britannia, this led to fragmentation into numerous local kingdoms. In northern Gaul, dominion was taken over by peoples such as the Franks and Burgundians, who had formerly lived beyond the imperial frontier.

=== Imperial acceptance (411–476) ===
Map of the Roman Empire (red) and the new barbarian kingdoms in the west in 460

The second stage in the formation of the barbarian kingdoms was the imperial acceptance of the status quo. The Roman government at no point saw the existence of semi-autonomous barbarian-controlled territories as desirable, but began to tolerate them through the 420s and 430s. Neither the Romans nor the various barbarian groups sought to establish new and lasting territorial kingdoms that replaced the imperial government. The rise of the barbarian kingdoms derived not from barbarian interest in creating them but from failures in Roman governance and a failure to integrate the barbarian rulers into the existing Roman imperial systems.

Early barbarian rulers were tolerated only on the terms of the Roman Empire. Early 'kingdoms', such as those of the Suebi and Vandals in Hispania, were consequently relegated to the edges of less important provinces. In 418, the Visigothic groups formerly under Alaric were settled by Emperor Honorius (r. 393–423) in Aquitania in southern Gaul, establishing the Visigothic Kingdom. The Romans envisioned this as a provisional settlement of loyal clients of the imperial government, whose support could be relied on in internal struggles. The settlement was not seen as an actual ceding of imperial territory, given that the Roman administration was also envisioned as continuing in the granted lands, albeit overseen by the Visigoths as vassals. Though some Roman generals in the time of Honorius had worked to curb the influence and power of the barbarian rulers, the number of civil wars that followed Honorius's death made the status of the barbarians a secondary concern. Instead of suppressing the barbarian kings, emperors and usurpers in the fifth century viewed them as useful internal players.

The third stage of the formation of the barbarian kingdoms was the recognition by the imperial government of the increasingly unstable Western Roman Empire that it was no longer able to effectively administer its own territories. This led the empire to cede effective control of more lands to the barbarian rulers, whose realms now formed a permanent part of the landscape. These territorial changes did not mean that lands within the former imperial borders ceased to be part of the Roman Empire on a conceptual level. Treaties made with the Visigoths in 439 and the Vandals, who had conquered North Africa, in 442 effectively recognized the rulers of those peoples as territorial governors of parts of imperial territory, ceasing the pretension of active imperial administration. These treaties, though not seen as irrevocable, laid the foundations of true territorial kingdoms.

Barbarian rulers took various steps to present themselves as legitimate rulers within the Roman imperial framework, nominally subservient to the Western Roman emperor. This practice continued even after the deposition of the final western emperor, Romulus Augustulus, in 476. Barbarian rulers after 476 typically presented themselves as subservient to the remaining Eastern Roman emperor, and were in turn at times granted various honors by the imperial government.

=== Emergence as territorial kingdoms (476–600) ===
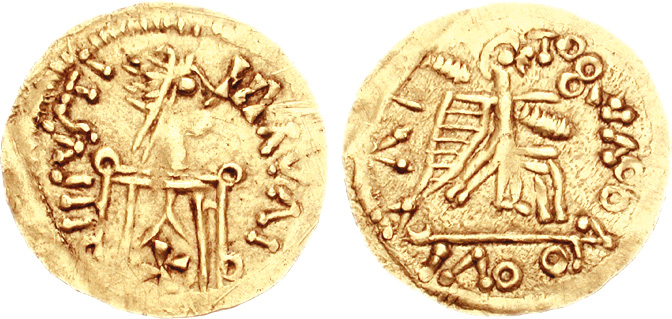
Coin of Liuvigild, king of the Visigoths, minted in 580–583. Liuvigild was the earliest Visigothic king to mint coins in his own name.

Almost nowhere in Western Europe were barbarian rulers firmly linked to territorial kingdoms until the very late fifth century or even later. The final stage in the formation of the barbarian kingdoms occurred as the barbarian rulers slowly lost the habit of waiting for the Western Roman Empire to again function properly. Left to their own devices, barbarian rulers instead began to take on the roles formerly held by the emperors, transitioning into proper territorial kings. This process was only possible through the acceptance of barbarian rulers by local Roman aristocrats, who in many cases saw the possibility of restored Western Roman central control as an increasingly futile prospect. Many barbarian rulers enjoyed considerable support from Roman aristocrats, who raised armies from their own lands both against and for them.

The populace of the barbarian-controlled territories in Western Europe continued to view themselves as part of the Roman Empire well into the sixth century. When Theodoric the Great (r. 493–526), the Ostrogothic king of Italy, also became ruler of the Visigoths of Hispania in 511, this was celebrated in Ravenna as a liberation of Hispania and a re-integration of the Visigothic territories into the Roman Empire. This is despite the Visigoths also having been de jure part of the empire before this point.

The exact process in which the barbarian kings took on certain functions and prerogatives previously ascribed to the Roman emperors is not entirely clear. It is believed to have been a highly drawn-out process. History generally recognizes Alaric I as the first 'king of the Visigoths', though this title is applied to him only retroactively. Contemporary sources refer to Alaric only as dux or at times hegemon, and he did not rule a kingdom, instead spending his career unsuccessfully trying to integrate himself and his people into the Roman imperial system. The earliest Visigothic ruler known to have called himself a king and to issue documents from something resembling an imperial chancery was Alaric II (r. 484–507), though contemporary writings allude to widespread acceptance and recognition of a Visigothic kingdom in Gaul by the 450s. The Visigoths did not establish a secure power-base as a consciously post-imperial kingdom until the 560s under Liuvigild, after slow and often brutal conquests in Hispania.

The practice of the barbarian kingdoms being subservient to the Eastern Roman emperor came to an end as a result of the wars of reconquest of Emperor Justinian I (r. 527–565). Justinian sought to restore direct imperial control to the former western empire, though his reconquest was incomplete and established the idea that any lands outside of the eastern empire's direct control were no longer part of the Roman Empire, also causing Roman identity to decline dramatically in Western Europe. The coinage of the Visigothic Kingdom continued to depict the eastern emperors until the 580s, when the Visigothic kings began to mint coins in their own name.

== Roman heritage and continuity ==
=== Administrative continuity ===
The rise of the barbarian kingdoms saw power in Western Europe being dispersed from a single capital, such as Rome or Ravenna in the past, to several local kings and warlords. Despite this, the apparatus of the former imperial government continued to fundamentally function in the west because the barbarian rulers adopted many aspects of the late Roman administration. Roman law remained the predominant legal system through the fifth and sixth centuries. Several barbarian kings showed interest in legal matters and issued their own law codes, developed based on Roman law.

Towns and cities had been the main building blocks of the old empire and initially remained as such in the barbarian kingdoms as well. The disappearance of the old Roman imperial framework was a gradual and slow process, spanning centuries and at times accelerated due to political upheaval. The old Roman administrative system of provinces, dioceses, and praetorian prefectures remained partially functional in some places under the barbarian rulers. Some rulers even took steps to restore parts of the administration. In 510, the Ostrogothic king of Italy, Theodoric the Great, restored the Praetorian prefecture of Gaul on territory he conquered from the Visigoths and appointed as praetorian prefect the Roman aristocrat Liberius.

A large number of Roman political and bureaucratic offices survived the end of the Western Roman Empire, attested in the various law codes issued by the barbarian kings. There are numerous documents that demonstrate that Romans continued to be active in such offices within the kingdoms. The establishment of the barbarian kingdoms did thus not bring an end to Roman society. Per the Irish historian Peter Brown, they can instead be seen as "on the contrary [having] brought law and order to regions that had suffered for decades from a perilous vacuum of authority."

The major difference between the Roman imperial administration and the new royal administrations was their scale. Without a central imperial court and officers that linked the governments of the different provinces together, the administrations in the kingdoms were flattened, becoming significantly less deep and complex. The smaller size of the barbarian kingdoms meant that official power was truncated and that the opportunities of personal advancement and careers that had existed in the old empire were no longer possible. This breakdown in Roman order had the side effect of leading to a marked decline in living standards, as well as a collapse in economic and social complexity. This development was not universal and many places, such as Gaul, came to experience economic upswings in the sixth century.

=== Roman legitimacy ===
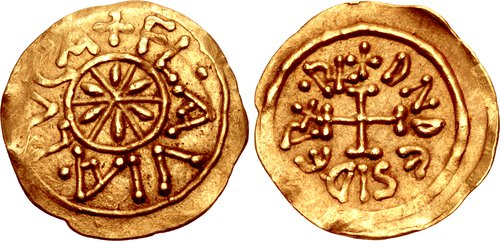
Coin of Desiderius, king of Italy 756–774, with the inscription DN DESIDER REX (dominus noster Desiderius rex)

In the aftermath of the collapse of the Western Roman Empire, the barbarian rulers in Western Europe made an effort to strengthen legitimacy by adopting certain elements of the former empire. The title most widely used by the kings was rex, which formed a basis of authority which they could use in diplomacy with other kingdoms and the surviving imperial court in Constantinople. Although some Eastern Roman authors, such as Procopius, described rex as a "barbarian term", it had at points in the past sometimes been used to describe Roman emperors and served to indicate that the barbarian rulers were sovereign rulers, though not with authority eclipsing that of the emperor in Constantinople.

Many, but not all, of the barbarian kings used ethnic qualifiers in their title. The Frankish kings, for instance, rendered their title as rex Francorum ("king of the Franks"). The rulers of Italy, where the pretense of Roman continuity was especially strong, are notable in that they only rarely used ethnic qualifiers.

In addition to rex, the barbarian rulers also assumed various Roman imperial titles and honours. Virtually all of the barbarian kings assumed the style dominus noster ("our lord"), (Note: Dominus noster continued to be used throughout Western Europe for centuries. For rulers of Italy, the style is recorded as late as under Desiderius (r. 756–774), the last Lombard king of Italy, whose coins style him as dominus noster Desiderius rex.) previously used only by Roman emperors, and nearly all of the Visigothic kings and the barbarian kings of Italy (up until the end of the Lombard kingdom) used the praenomen Flavius, borne by virtually all Roman emperors in late antiquity. The early barbarian rulers were careful to maintain a subordinate position to the emperors in Constantinople, and were in turn sometimes recognised with various honours by the emperors, in effect serving as highly autonomous client kings.

Although the barbarian kingdoms were ruled by non-Romans, no one in late antiquity would have doubted that they belonged to the greater late Roman political system. The kingdoms were in some cases rooted in barbarian traditions but were also linked to high Roman imperial magistracies and their rulers held formal and recognized vice-imperial powers.

=== Possibility of imperial restoration ===
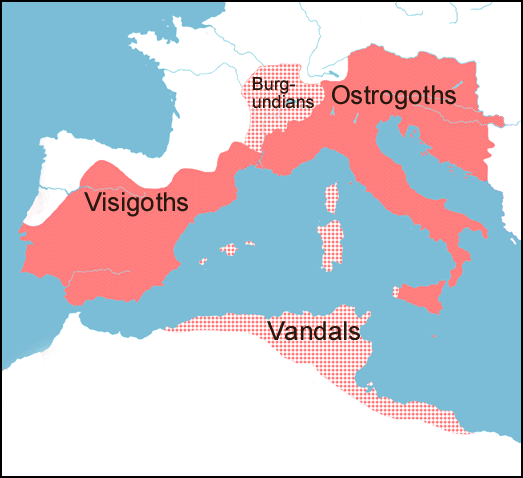
At his realm's height in 523, Theodoric the Great ruled the Ostrogoths of Italy, was regent for Hispania's Visigoths and had forced the Burgundians and Vandals to pay tribute.

In the early sixth century, the most powerful kings in Western Europe were Theodoric the Great of Italy and Clovis I of the Franks. Both rulers received honours and recognition by the imperial court in Constantinople, which granted them a certain degree of legitimacy and was used to justify territorial expansion. Theodoric was recognised as a patrician by Emperor Anastasius I, who also returned the western imperial regalia, in Constantinople since 476, to Italy. These regalia were worn by Theoderic on occasions, and some of his Roman subjects referred to him as an emperor, (Note: For instance, an inscription by Caecina Mavortius Basilius Decius (western consul in 486, praetorian prefect of Italy 486–493) refers to Theoderic as dominus noster gloriosissimus adque inclytus rex Theodericus victor ac triumfator semper Augustus ("Our lord, the most glorious and renowned king Theoderic, victor and triumphant, always Augustus.")) but he himself appears to have used only the title rex, being careful not to insult the emperor. After the Franks defeated the Visigoths at the Battle of Vouillé in 507, Clovis was recognised by Anastasius as honorary consul, a patrician and a client king. Like Theoderic, some of the subjects of Clovis also referred to him as an emperor, rather than king, though he never adopted that title himself.

Theodoric and Clovis came close to war several times and it is conceivable that the victor of such a conflict would have re-established the Western Roman Empire under his own rule. Though no war happened, such developments worried the Eastern Roman emperors. Worried that their granted honours could be seen as imperial "stamps of approval", the eastern court never granted them to the same extent again. Instead, the eastern empire began to emphasise its own exclusive Roman legitimacy, which it would continue to do for the rest of its history.

In the sixth century, Eastern Roman historians began to describe the west as "lost" to barbarian invasions, rather than the fact that many barbarian kings had been settled by the Romans themselves. This development has been termed the "Justinianic ideological offensive" by modern historians. Though the rise of the barbarian kingdoms in the place of the western empire was far from an entirely peaceful process, the idea of "barbarian invasions" bringing a sudden and violent end to the world of antiquity, once also the widely accepted narrative among modern historians, does not accurately describe the period. Out of the many barbarian kingdoms, the only realm more or less entirely created through military conquest was the Vandal Kingdom in Africa. Ascribing the end of the Western Roman Empire to "barbarian invasions" also ignores the diversity of the new kingdoms in favor of a homogenous non-Roman barbarism and ignores any analysis in which the empire could be seen as complicit in its own collapse.

== Culture ==
Despite being divided into several smaller realms, the populace of the barbarian kingdoms maintained strong cultural and religious connections with each other, and continued to speak Latin. At the same time, they also remained connected to their non-Roman identity and made efforts to establish their own distinct identities.

Roman identity gradually disappeared in Western Europe, both due to the Eastern Roman Empire emphasizing its own unique Roman legitimacy and due to the local barbarian ruling class and Roman populations merging ethnically. The fading connectivity to the Roman Empire and the political division of the west led to a gradual fragmentation of culture and language, eventually giving rise to the modern Romance peoples and Romance languages.

=== Religion ===
Religion was central to the identity and politics of the barbarian kingdoms. Many of their rulers and elites initially adhered to Arianism, a form of Christianity that rejected the Nicene definition of the Trinity. This confession, often adopted while still serving as federates within the empire, provided a marker of distinct identity that separated Gothic and Vandal rulers from their predominantly Nicene Roman subjects. The Ostrogoths, Visigoths, and Vandals each maintained Arian hierarchies alongside existing Catholic communities, sometimes using confessional difference to reinforce political independence from Constantinople.

Despite its divisive potential, Arianism was not always a source of sharp persecution. In many cases, rulers tolerated the Catholic episcopate, recognizing its role in maintaining civic order. Theodoric the Great, for instance, upheld religious coexistence in Italy while asserting his authority over both Arian and Catholic institutions. However, conflicts did emerge: the Vandals in North Africa, for example, subjected Nicene bishops to exile, confiscation of property, and occasional violence, reflecting the politicization of confessional boundaries.

Over time, Arianism gave way to Nicene Christianity. In 589, King Reccared I of the Visigoths converted to Catholicism at the Third Council of Toledo, a landmark in the integration of Gothic and Hispano-Roman identities.

== End of the barbarian kingdoms ==
Political map of Europe in 814

The barbarian kingdoms proved to be extremely fragile states. Out of the three most powerful and long-lasting kingdoms—those of the Visigoths, Franks and Lombards—only the Frankish Kingdom and a Lombardic rump state in southern Italy would survive into the High Middle Ages.

The Suebian Kingdom was conquered by the Visigoths in 585, which in turn were conquered by the Umayyad Caliphate in 721. The Kingdom of the Gepids was conquered by the Lombards in 567. In his wars of reconquest, the Eastern emperor Justinian I destroyed both the Vandal Kingdom in Africa and the Ostrogothic Kingdom in Italy. Between 532–534, the Franks conquered both the Thuringi as well as the Burgundian Kingdom. In 774, they conquered the Kingdom of the Lombards with the exception of Benevento.

The emergence of barbarian kingdoms was by and large a Roman political phenomenon which occurred in the context of the late Roman geopolitical landscape. In place of these kingdoms, new realms emerged in the seventh through ninth centuries that represented a new order, largely disconnected from the old Roman world. The Umayyad Caliphate, which conquered Hispania from the Visigoths and North Africa from the Eastern Roman Empire, made no pretenses of Roman continuity. The Lombard Kingdom, though often counted among the other barbarian kingdoms, ruled an Italy destroyed by conflict between the Ostrogoths and the Eastern Roman Empire. Their rule in Italy came to an end when their kingdom was conquered by the Franks in 774. The small successor kingdoms of the Visigoths in Hispania—predecessors of medieval kingdoms such as León, Castile, and Aragon—were fundamentally sub-Frankish, culturally and administratively closer to the Frankish Kingdom than the fallen Visigothic Kingdom.

As the sole survivor of the old kingdoms, the Frankish Kingdom provided the model of early medieval kingship that would later inspire Western European monarchs throughout the rest of the Middle Ages. Though the Frankish rulers remembered Roman ideals and often aspired to vague ideas of imperial restoration, the centuries of their rule had transformed the governance of their kingdom into something that bore very little resemblance to the Roman Empire. The new form of government was a personal one, based on powers of, and relationships between, individuals, rather than the heavily administrated, judicial and bureaucratic system of the Romans. The time of the barbarian kingdoms came to an end with the coronation of Charlemagne, king of the Franks, as Roman emperor by Pope Leo III in 800, in opposition to the authority of the remaining Eastern Roman Empire. Charlemagne's Carolingian Empire, a predecessor of France and Germany, was in reality more similar to a collection of kingdoms united only by Charlemagne's authority than a realm with a meaningful connection to the old Western Roman Empire.

== Historiography ==
The interpretation of the barbarian kingdoms has long been shaped by broader historiographical debates over the end of the Western Roman Empire. Early modern scholarship, influenced by Renaissance and Enlightenment conceptions of decline, portrayed the kingdoms as evidence of Rome's collapse and the onset of a "barbarized" Europe. Nineteenth- and early twentieth-century historians often reinforced this image, echoing ethnographic stereotypes from Roman sources that depicted Goths, Vandals, and other groups as destructive outsiders.

From the mid-twentieth century onward, historians increasingly emphasized continuity and transformation rather than abrupt collapse. Peter Brown's "late antiquity" model, and the subsequent work of Ian Wood and others, highlighted the survival of Roman institutions within the kingdoms, as well as their role in reshaping political and cultural life. At the same time, scholars have stressed the need to interrogate the categories through which "barbarian" identity was constructed. In his work on ethnography, Greg Woolf has shown that Roman ethnographic traditions framed these peoples in ways that served imperial ideology rather than reflecting social reality. Historian Michael Maas similarly argues that late Roman ethnography integrated the barbarians into narratives of Rome’s destiny and decline, more concerned with meaning than with accuracy. This focus has led to greater caution in equating Roman literary depictions with the lived experience of the kingdoms. Modern historiography thus balances competing perspectives: the older model of decline, the transformation thesis emphasizing continuity, and approaches that examine how Roman perceptions shaped both ancient and modern understandings of the barbarian kingdoms.

== See also ==
- Early Middle Ages
- History of Europe
- Migration Period
- Dark Ages (historiography)
- Late antiquity
