= Jochen Bleicken =

German historian of classical antiquity (1926–2005)

Jochen Bleicken (3 September 1926 in Westerland, Sylt – 24 February 2005 in Hamburg) was a German professor of ancient history.

== Biography ==
The son of a salesman, Bleicken studied from 1948 to 1954 history and classical philology at the universities of Kiel and Frankfurt. He wrote his doctorate at the chair of Alfred Heuß at Kiel in 1954 and after his habilitation in 1962 became a professor of history in Hamburg, Frankfurt and from 1977 in Göttingen. He retired in 1991 but gave lectures until 1999.

His focus was on the history of the Roman Republic and the Principate, where his works gained importance like the structure of the Roman republic and a biography of Augustus.

From 1978 he was member of the Göttingen Academy of Sciences.

== Bibliography ==
- Bleicken, Jochen (1978). Prinzipat und Dominat: Gedanken zur Periodisierung der römischen Kaiserzeit. Wiesbaden: Steiner. ISBN 978-3-515-02876-9.
- Das Volkstribunat der klassischen Republik: Studien zu seiner Entwicklung zwischen 287 und 133 v. Chr. Beck, München 1955. 2. Aufl. 1968. (Zetemata, 13)
- Senatsgericht und Kaisergericht: eine Studie zur Entwicklung des Prozeßrechtes im frühen Prinzipat. Vandenhoeck & Ruprecht, Göttingen 1962.
- Lex publica: Gesetz und Recht in der römischen Republik. de Gruyter, Berlin 1975. ISBN 3-11-004584-2
- Die Verfassung der römischen Republik. Paderborn, Schöningh 1975. 8. Aufl. 2000. (UTB für Wissenschaft: Uni-Taschenbücher, 460) ISBN 3-8252-0460-X ISBN 3-506-99405-0
- Verfassungs- und Sozialgeschichte der römischen Kaiserzeit. 2 Bände. Paderborn, Schöningh 1978 und öfter.
- Geschichte der Römischen Republik. Oldenbourg, München 1980. 6. Aufl. 2004. (Oldenbourg Grundriss der Geschichte, 2) ISBN 3-486-49666-2
- Die athenische Demokratie. Schöningh, Paderborn 1986. 4., völlig und wesentlich erw. Aufl. 1995. ISBN 3-8252-1330-7
- Augustus. Eine Biographie. Fest, Berlin 1998. Sonderausgabe 2000. ISBN 3-8286-0136-7. English edition, Augustus: A Biography, London: Penguin Random House UK, 2016. ISBN 978-0-14-029482-8
- Gesammelte Schriften. 2 Bände. Steiner, Stuttgart 1998. ISBN 3-515-07241-1
- As editor:
  - Oldenbourgs Grundriß der Geschichte
  - Frankfurter Althistorische Studien (since 1968)
  - Hermes (since 1977)
