= Lex de imperio Vespasiani =

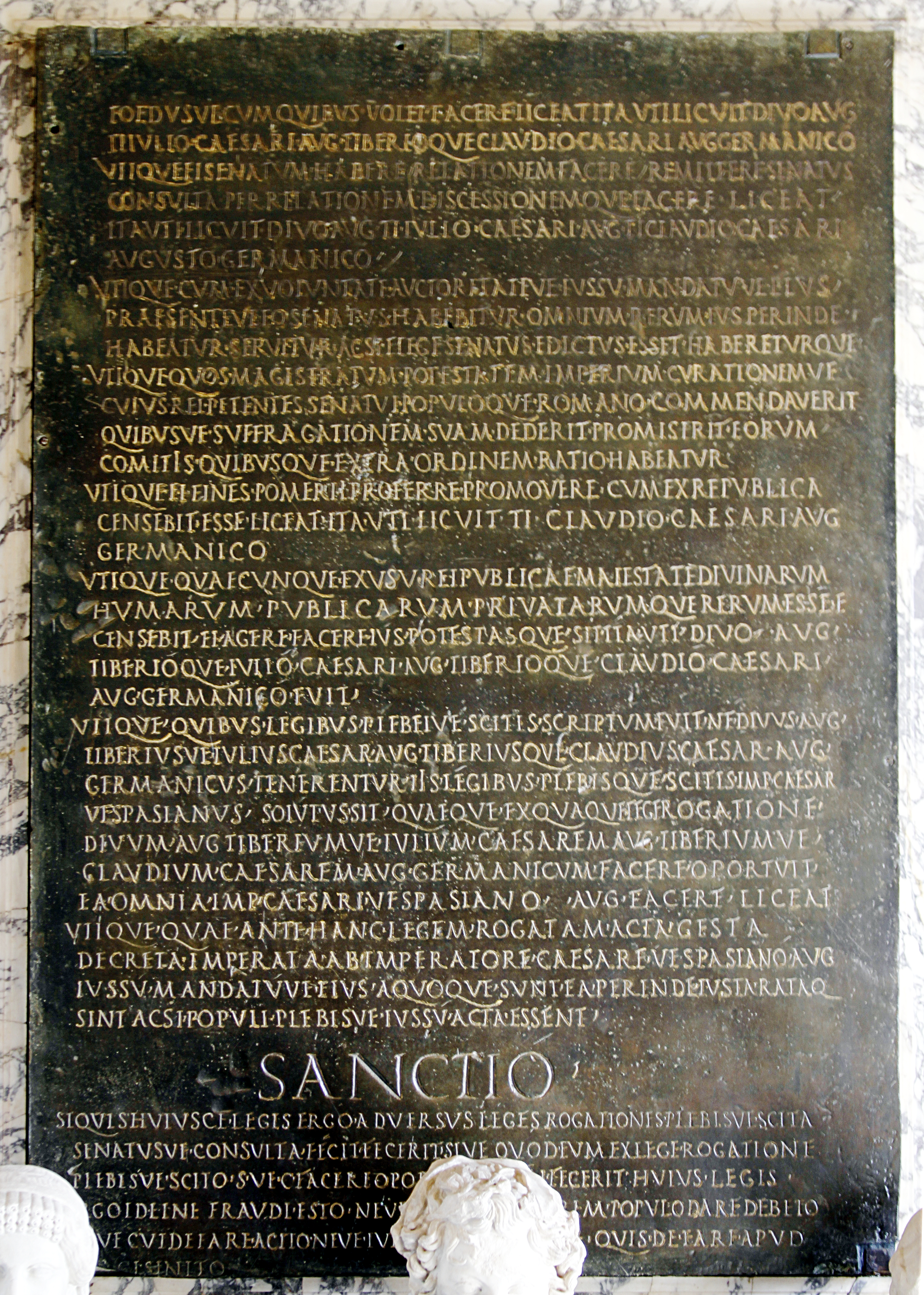
The surviving bronze tablet of the Lex de imperio Vespasiani

The Lex de imperio Vespasiani is an ancient Roman law partially preserved on a bronze tablet. The law was written across two tablets, but only the second survives. The title and preamble of the law are lost. The name by which it is now known is a reconstruction.

The law was decreed by the Senate as a senatus consultum in December 69 following the death of the Emperor Vitellius. It was approved by the Comitia in January 70, becoming a lex. It represents what Tacitus in his Histories described as the Senate giving Vespasian "all that is usual for emperors" (cuncta principibus solita). It contains eight clauses laying out what Vespasian was empowered to do and the precedents for this. Each clause begins with the word utique. The final section is a sanctio (sanction).

Vespasian is permitted to (1) make treaties, (2–3) convoke the Senate and propose motions, (4) endorse candidates for office and (5) expand the pomerium of the city. He is also given (6) wide discretionary power to do anything "he believes, in the interests of the State ... that he should do" so long as it has precedent, (7) all powers exercised by any prior emperor while himself not being subject to the law and (8) retroactive authorization for any acts of his prior to the enactment of the Lex de imperio. The only earlier emperors cited for precedent are Augustus, Tiberius and Claudius. It is possible that a similar package of powers was given to Caligula but does not survive.

The bronze tablet was discovered by Cola di Rienzo, possibly in the Lateran Basilica, before 1347. It is kept today in the Musei Capitolini. Cola knew a fuller text than the one that survives, but it is not certain that he saw the first tablet. There have been attempts to restore some of the lost text on the basis of the Cronica dell'Anonimo Romano. Cola used the Lex to formulate a conception of Roman sovereignty. He had it erected in the Lateran in a public ceremony. In Cola's interpretation, it demonstrated the former power of the Roman people:

Signori, tanta era la maiestate dello puopolo de Roma, che allo imperatore dava la autoritate. Ora l'avemo perduta.

Translation:

Gentlemen, so great was the majesty of the people of Rome that it gave authority to the Emperor. Now we have lost it.

In modern scholarship, the Lex has been the subject of many debates, such as whether it placed the emperor above the law or gave Vespasian new powers.
