= Dominate =

Historiographical periodisation of the Roman Empire during late antiquity

The Dominate was a period traditionally used to describe the Roman Empire beginning with the reign of Emperor Diocletian (c. AD 284). The term Dominate is now rarely used as an analytical model in modern scholarship.

Proposed in the 19th-century by the German scholar Theodor Mommsen, he contrasted it with the earlier Principate established by Augustus in 27 BC, which he interpreted as a system in which imperial authority was formally embedded within Roman Republican institutions. Mommsen argued that this later period marked a rupture in the constitutional basis of the empire, moving from one legitimised by a republican senate and people to one where the emperor became the state.

Since the start of the 20th century, scholars have increasingly rejected this view of a rupture around the time of Diocletian. Although significant changes occurred, these developments are generally not seen as fundamentally altering the emperor's legal position within the Roman state or the basic structure of Roman governance.

== Background ==
The historian Jochen Bleicken credits Theodor Mommsen with introducing the concepts of Principate and Dominate into the literature to periodise the Roman Empire.

Based on lecture notes of Sebastian and Paul Hensen in Mommsen's lectures (1882–6) that were published posthumously as part of his History of Rome, Mommsen explains the concept as follows:

[MH.III, 1] The era of Diocletian bears the mark of decline, and does not attract our sympathy. The significance of this era, however, is all the greater because of this very decline and the paucity of intellectual resources at its disposal. The dominate of Diocletian and Constantine differs sharply from the principate's position, the Republic. The oriental ruler provides the model for the dominate. Whereas the unity of the Empire prevailed under the principate, the division of the Empire prevailed under the dominate. The nationalities divided into a Greek and Latin half. Whereas the principate had been Latin-Greek, the dominate was Greek-Latin. There was a different capital city; Italy loses its privileged status, and there is a complete reform of the administration. The military machines turns into an effective and mobile one; the principate had only frontier troops. Foreigners now join the army, above all Germans. An effective finance administration also develops and Constantine reintroduces the universally current gold coin, the Solidus. A new religion emerges which, although not exactly Christian, nevertheless still differs from that of the principate.

Mommsen continued the distinction in [MH.III, 8]:

There was increased emphasis on the title Augustus, since the old tripartite title highlighted the magisterial nature of the Emperor's position. The title Pius felix made an early appearance and was already imbued with supernatural overtones. Later there was frequent use of the titles perpetuus Augustus and semper Augustus (forever Augustus). The word dominus, which initially denoted slave-owners, became a new title for the Emperor, as well as for a god. Throughout the entire principate this title vied with the legitimate one; even the earlier Emperors had difficulty fending off adulation of this kind. Gradually the dominate prevailed. Domitian was already a key figure in the process. In the third century this way of addressing the Emperor began to gain ground. The coins are an expression of official power: in the reign of Aurelian the title dominus first appeared on coins, combined with deus: domino et deo nato - born to be lord and god. We might supplement this with: servi et cives Romani - Roman citizens born to be slaves. From then onwards it appeared more frequently on coins, especially in the case of the other Emperors, but still the Emperor did not style himself as such until the era of Constantine. This marks another victory for the Greek element: among the Greeks deification of the living is as ancient as monarchy itself. The ceremony of adoration was a practical application of this; people shook hands with the earlier Emperors, or kissed them, like other distinguished persons. Diocletian introduced genuflection. This, too represented a move closer to the oriental idea. It aroused opposition in Rome. The idea of the Emperor as a deity could not be reconciled with Christianity: the idea of the god on earth was abandoned, the lord on earth remained.

== Historiography ==
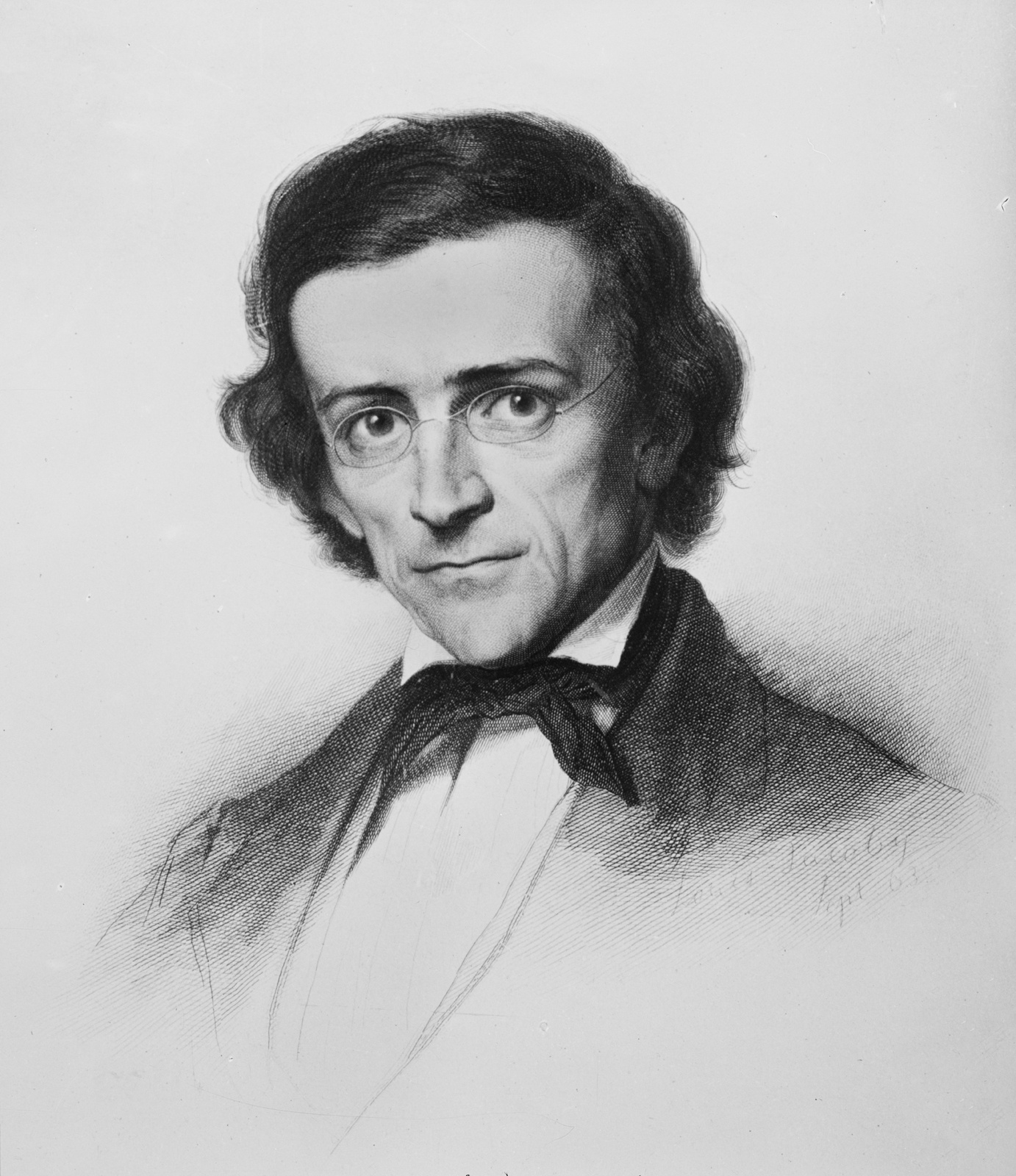
Theodor Mommsen (1817—1903)

Theodor Mommsen's concept of the "Dominate" was grounded in constitutional law and rested on the idea of a transformation in imperial authority, embodied in the principle of nomos empsychos ("living law"). Historians described the Dominate as the foundation of a pan-European model of bureaucratic absolute monarchy, in contrast to the more decentralised political and economic arrangements associated with the Republic and the Principate.

Mommsen's interpretation was later criticised for overemphasising the role of law. Scholarship on Roman imperial politics subsequently developed through three major phases. The move away from the legal and constitutional framework of Mommsen first occurred in the 1910-1930s by placing more value on the networks of people, with Ronald Syme's work significantly challenged the explanatory power of the Mommsenian model. Further changes occurred in the 1960s to mid-1980s with a view of how rulers interact with communities, and now with broader views shaped by the social and political sciences.

German historian Jochen Bleicken argued in 1978 that the division of imperial rule into "Principate" and "Dominate" was not based on any genuine constitutional transformation and that both terms were ill-suited for strict periodisation. Bleicken believed Mommsen's perspective reflected the socio-political context of the 18th and 19th centuries more than Roman political realities, particularly contemporary reactions to absolutist rule in post-Napoleonic Europe. That the distinction was shaped in part by comparisons with the oriental Persian and other eastern courts, reinforcing an interpretive contrast between "Roman" and "un-Roman" forms of rule.

Judicial evidence has likewise been used to question the sharpness of the traditional division. Markéta Melounová's analysis of judicial trials, particularly those concerning religious and political offences, found little substantive difference between the periods conventionally labelled "Principate" and "Dominate".

Reflecting these reassessments, the Oxford Classical Dictionary now regards "dominate" as a near-obsolete analytical term.

== See also ==
- Constitution of the Late Roman Empire
