= Sultan of Sultans =

Ottoman Turkish title

Sultan of Sultans is the literal English translation of the Ottoman Turkish imperial title sulṭānü's-selāṭīn. As with various other laudatory titles of Semitic origin, such as "King of Kings", Sultan of Sultans can express a claim of imperial rank up to and including universal legitimate sovereignty. Although the notion and title of an emperor is largely alien to Islamic tradition, the Ottoman dynasty, which employed the title of "Sultan of Sultans" in its official full style, had perhaps the best claim to usage due to its territorial extent and great length. The Ottomans also adopted the traditional Byzantine imperial title Caesar for their own ruler (the Padishah).

The title Sultan of Sultans was used for the Delhi Sultan Altamsh (Iltutmish) in the inscription of Sultan Ghari. The title was first used by the sultan of the Delhi Sultanate in the Persian context. The sultans of the Delhi Sultanate used this title to signify their rule over North India as hundreds of Indian rajas ruled under their suzerainty. But they also considered themselves beneath the caliph however they were independent.

Similarly, the sultans of Bengal also used this title. Examples of that are Rukunuddin Kaikaus and Saifuddin Hamza Shah.

The sultans of Seljuk also used this title. An example of that is Sanjar.

The Ottomans used this title quite regularly.

The Shahanshah (Persian for "King of Kings") of Iran also claimed, with slightly less legitimacy, to be the "Sultan of Sultans". An example of that is Nader Shah. These assertions were tied to the conflict between the Sunni and Shiite branches of Islam.

== Sources ==
Bibliography

- G. W. Prothero, Stanley Leathes, Sir Adolphus William Ward, John Emerich Edward Dalberg-Acton Acton (Baron.) (1907). The Cambridge Modern History. CUP Archive. p. 95.
