= Finney, Texas =

- Unincorporated community
- Location in Texas and the United States Finney (the United States)
- Coordinates: 33°46′53″N 100°22′47″W
- Country: United States
- State: Texas
- County: King
- Elevation: 1,929 ft (588 m)

Population (2000 est.)
  - Total: 70
- Time zone: UTC-6 (Central (CST))
  - Summer (DST): UTC-5 (CDT)
- Area code: 806
- GNIS feature ID: 1379767

Finney is an unincorporated community in King County, Texas, United States.

As of the 1990 Census, the population was estimated to be 70 residents.

== History ==
Located in the fertile ranch and farmland of King County, Finney was named after neighboring Finney Springs. As with the rest of the communities in this sparsely populated county, Finney has never possessed a high number of residents; the most ever counted in the community was 100 during the 1960s. It was also during this time that the Finney School, built in 1912, was consolidated with Guthrie schools. By 1990 the population had fallen to 70 and there were no operating businesses.

== Education ==
Finney is served by the Guthrie Common School District.
