= Grow, Texas =

- Unincorporated community
- Location in Texas and the United States Grow (the United States)
- Coordinates: 33°48′35″N 100°17′55″W
- Country: United States
- State: Texas
- County: King
- Elevation: 1,854 ft (565 m)

Population (2000 est.)
  - Total: 70
- Time zone: UTC-6 (Central (CST))
  - Summer (DST): UTC-5 (CDT)
- Area code: 806
- GNIS feature ID: 1379866

Grow is an unincorporated community in King County, Texas, United States. It lies in the north-central part of the county, approximately 85 miles east of Lubbock.

== History ==
In response to the growing number of families settling in the northern part of King County at the start of the 20th century, a school was established in 1901 to serve area students. Ora Blackwell served as the first teacher in the community, which was then known as Bala. Her sister, Mrs. Charles Davidson, was the local postmaster; the Bala post office was housed in the Davidson family home. Jim Goodwin built a cotton gin in Bala in 1908, stimulating limited growth. Sometime between 1911 and 1912 the community's name was changed from Bala to Grow.

As was the case with all of the other communities in sparsely populated King County, Grow has remained a largely rural community throughout its existence. Its population hovered at 25 or so residents throughout the 1920s and 1930s and though the post office closed in 1930, the population high mark came in 1941 when Grow was reportedly home to an estimated 150 people. However, economic changes led most residents to relocate to urban areas and by the end of the 1950s, almost half of Grow's inhabitants had moved away.

By 1970, the Grow school had long since consolidated with Guthrie schools, and local estimates suggested the population had fallen to 85; by 1980 this had fallen to 70, a figure Grow has maintained consistently since.

== Education ==
Grow is served by the Guthrie Common School District.
