= From the Place in the Valley Deep in the Forest =

2001 short-story collection by Mitch Cullin

- First edition
- Author: Mitch Cullin
- Illustrator: Peter I. Chang
- Publisher: Dufour Editions
- Publication date: November 2001
- ISBN: 978-0-8023-1336-2
- OCLC: 46565102
- Dewey Decimal: 813/.54 21
- LC Class: PS3553.U319 F76 2001
- Preceded by: The Cosmology of Bing 2001
- Followed by: UnderSurface 2002

From the Place in the Valley Deep in the Forest is a short-story collection by American writer Mitch Cullin, and is the author's fifth book. It was first published as a trade paperback in November 2001 by Dufour Editions in the US. A UK trade paperback edition was published by Weidenfeld & Nicolson in January 2005. In 2007, the Italian publisher FBE released a trade paperback translation of the collection as Da Quel Luogo Nella Valle Dentro La Foresta.

The collection was given a starred review from Booklist in its December 12, 2001 publication.

== Contents ==
Several of the stories in the collection had been published previously in literary magazines, although they were greatly revised for the book and often given new titles. Three of the eight stories were previously unpublished. The stories are listed below in the order in which they appear in the book.

Title	Previously published in	Year Written
Voice of the Sun	The Bayou Review and Texas Writers Newsletter	1995 / 1997
From the Place in the Valley Deep in the Forest	Previously unpublished	2001
History is Dead	Previously unpublished	2001
Wormwood	finalist in the Santa Barbara Review's Phenomena of Place contest	1997
Five Women in No Particular Order	Austin Flux	1995
Viv's Biding	Previously unpublished	2001
Sifting Through	Austin Flux and Little, Brown's Best American Gay Fiction 2	1996
Totem	Harrington's Gay Men's Quarterly	1999
