= Snow Goose Produce =

- Location: 15170 Fir Island Road Mount Vernon, WA 98273; Fir Island, Washington; 48°21′15″N 122°25′22″W
- Interactive map of Snow Goose Produce

Snow Goose Produce is a farm stand located on Fir Island in Skagit County, Washington.

The roadside farmers market is located in the Skagit Valley midway between the towns of Conway and La Conner. The seasonal stand sells local goods and produce such as organic vegetables, Dungeness crab, smoked salmon, and large scoops of ice cream.

The business is named after the migratory snow geese that winter on Fir Island and elsewhere in the Skagit River delta.
