= Small Kingdoms =

2010 novel by Anastasia Hobbet

Small Kingdoms is an English-language novel written by Anastasia Hobbet. The plot of the novel is about the life in Kuwait between the two Gulf wars. This book was first published by Permanent Press on 1 January 2010.

== Synopsis ==
The novel is set in Kuwait during the years between Permanent Press. The novel shows five people— rich and poor, native and foreigner, Muslim, Christian, and non-believer. They find that a teenage Indian maid was being badly abused by her employer. Although they have their own problems and real-life dramas they decide to fight for this helpless lady.

== Characters ==
These are the main characters of the novel—

- Mufeeda, a Muslim woman
- Emmanuella, Mufeeda's Indian cook/maid
- Theo, a doctor
- Hanaan
- Kit

== Reception ==
The novel received mainly positive reviews. Curledup wrote in their review— "in a novel that is deeply human and emotionally turbulent, Hobbet creates a fascinating story of Kuwait between the two Gulf wars."
