= The Cosmology of Bing =

2002 novel by Mitch Cullin

- First edition
- Author: Mitch Cullin
- Publisher: Permanent Press
- Publication date: April 2001
- Publication place: United States
- Preceded by: Tideland (2000)
- Followed by: UnderSurface (2002)

The Cosmology of Bing is the fourth novel by American author Mitch Cullin. It was first published in April 2001 as a hardback edition from Permanent Press.
