= Guthrie, Texas =

Census-designated place in Texas, US

- Census-designated place
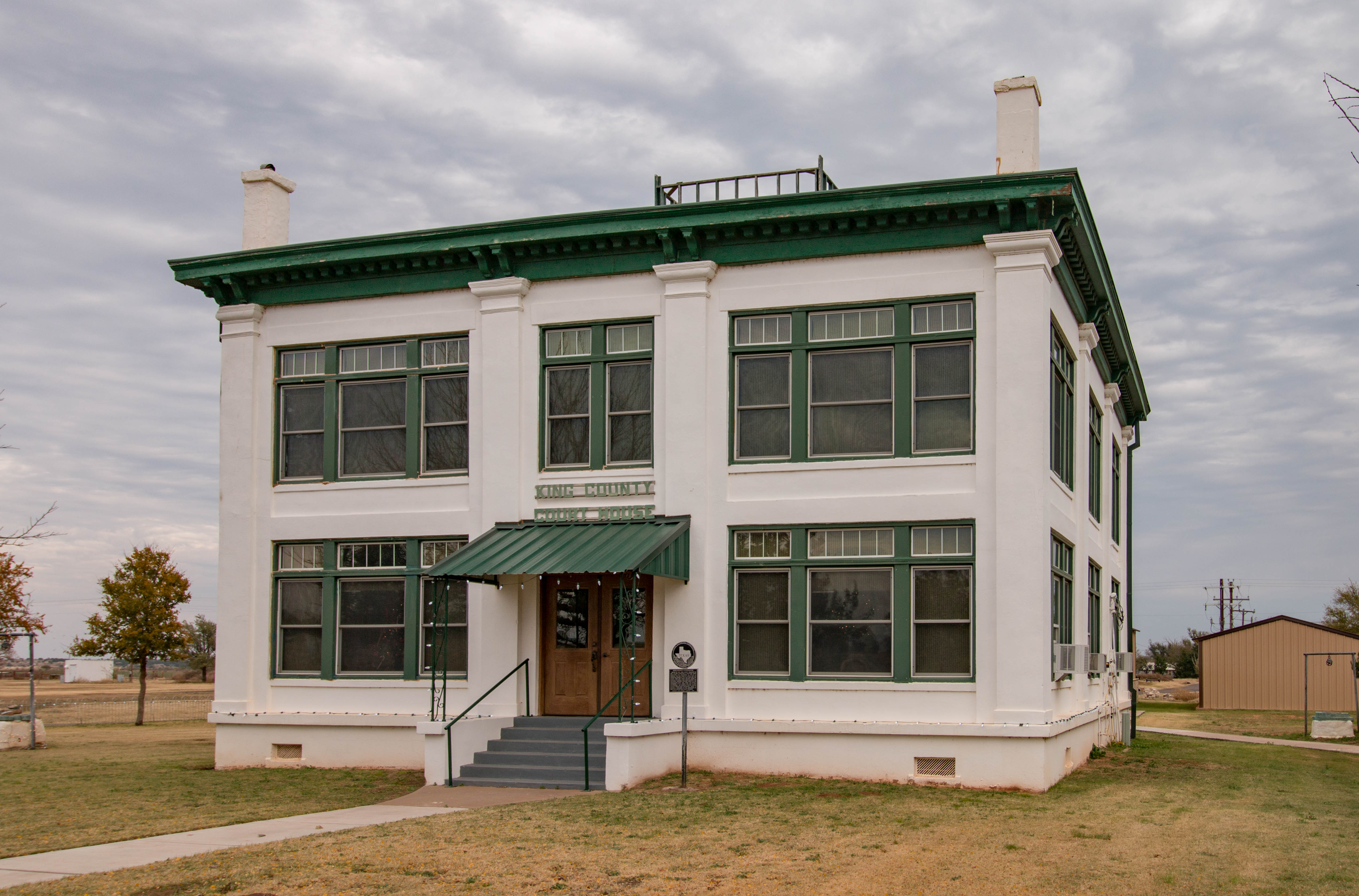
- The old King County Courthouse in Guthrie

- Location in Texas and the United States Guthrie (the United States)
- Coordinates: 33°37′34″N 100°19′49″W
- Country: United States
- State: Texas
- County: King

Area
  - Total: 1.78 sq mi (4.61 km^{2})
  - Land: 1.78 sq mi (4.61 km^{2})
  - Water: 0 sq mi (0.0 km^{2})
- Elevation: 1,772 ft (540 m)

Population (2020)
  - Total: 151
  - Density: 84.8/sq mi (32.8/km^{2})
- Time zone: UTC-6 (Central (CST))
  - Summer (DST): UTC-5 (CDT)
- ZIP code: 79236
- Area code: 806
- FIPS code: 48-31640
- GNIS feature ID: 2584647

Guthrie is an unincorporated town and census-designated place (CDP) in and the county seat of King County in the U.S. state of Texas. It is in the northern part of the state, 93 miles (150 km) east of Lubbock and 117 miles (188 km) west of Wichita Falls. It serves as the principal headquarters of the Four Sixes Ranch. As of the 2020 census, its population was 151, down from 160 at 2010.

== History ==
Guthrie's recorded history begins in 1883, when the Louisville Land and Cattle Company in Louisville, Kentucky, purchased several hundred acres in what later became King County. Named after Louisville Land and Cattle stockholder W.H. Guthrie, the community's townsite was platted in 1891 by Andrew Chester Tackitt (son of Rev. Pleasant Tackitt, who had built Guthrie's first residence). When King County was organized that same year, Louisville Land and Cattle proposed the platting of a company townsite, to be named "Ashville", to serve as the county's seat. Tackitt strongly opposed this proposition and led a charge to bring the seat to Guthrie, instead. Tackitt's hotly contested campaign ultimately proved successful, and he not only succeeded in making Guthrie the county seat, but was also elected to serve as King County's first county judge. Late in 1891, the Guthrie post office opened to the public.

The next year, Tackitt and a man by the name of Charlie Bradford brought in lumber from the neighboring community of Seymour and constructed Guthrie's first school, a small, one-room building. A larger school followed in 1895, though the lone teacher continued to depend upon schools in Seymour and Benjamin for curriculum. Proprietor John Gibson began to keep a stock of school books at his Guthrie general store in 1897, decreasing the school's dependence upon other districts.

In 1904, Guthrie claimed 101 residents, and though hurt by the effects of the Great Depression and the Dust Bowl, remained stable through to the mid-20th century, with the 1950 Census also reporting 101 residents. In 1959, schools in nearby Dumont were consolidated with Guthrie's schools, and by 1963, its population had more than doubled to 210.

The mid- to late 1960s brought an end to Guthrie's growth; the population had fallen to 125 by 1970. It increased to 140 in 1980 and 160 in 1990, a figure it maintained through to the 2010 census. Being a company town, very few homes in Guthrie are privately owned; most residents live in housing provided by the 6666 (Four Sixes) or Pitchfork ranches, or the school district.

== Geography ==
Guthrie is located in west-central King County, on the north side of the South Wichita River. U.S. Route 82 passes through the western side of the community, and U.S. Route 83 passes through the center of Guthrie.

According to the U.S. Census Bureau, the Guthrie CDP has an area of 11,000 acres (4,600 ha), of which 7.1 acres (2.87 ha), or 0.06%, is covered by water.

=== Climate ===
According to the Köppen climate classification, Guthrie has a humid subtropical climate, denoted as Cfa on climate maps, though it closely borders a cool semi-arid climate (BSk).

Guthrie has a USDA hardiness zone of 7b, with minimum temperatures ranging from 5 to 10 °F or −15.0 to −12.2 °C.

Climate data for Guthrie, Texas (1991–2020 normals, extremes 1964–present)
Month	Jan	Feb	Mar	Apr	May	Jun	Jul	Aug	Sep	Oct	Nov	Dec	Year
Record high °F (°C)	86 (30)	95 (35)	103 (39)	109 (43)	113 (45)	119 (48)	116 (47)	114 (46)	111 (44)	107 (42)	93 (34)	89 (32)	119 (48)
Mean maximum °F (°C)	78.5 (25.8)	82.9 (28.3)	90.1 (32.3)	95.3 (35.2)	100.5 (38.1)	103.5 (39.7)	105.7 (40.9)	104.5 (40.3)	100.3 (37.9)	95.0 (35.0)	85.2 (29.6)	77.9 (25.5)	108.1 (42.3)
Mean daily maximum °F (°C)	56.6 (13.7)	60.6 (15.9)	69.5 (20.8)	78.4 (25.8)	86.4 (30.2)	93.9 (34.4)	97.6 (36.4)	97.1 (36.2)	88.9 (31.6)	78.8 (26.0)	66.7 (19.3)	57.4 (14.1)	77.7 (25.4)
Daily mean °F (°C)	42.0 (5.6)	45.4 (7.4)	53.9 (12.2)	62.4 (16.9)	72.0 (22.2)	80.6 (27.0)	84.2 (29.0)	83.3 (28.5)	75.1 (23.9)	63.8 (17.7)	52.0 (11.1)	43.1 (6.2)	63.2 (17.3)
Mean daily minimum °F (°C)	27.4 (−2.6)	30.3 (−0.9)	38.4 (3.6)	46.4 (8.0)	57.7 (14.3)	67.2 (19.6)	70.7 (21.5)	69.4 (20.8)	61.4 (16.3)	48.9 (9.4)	37.3 (2.9)	28.9 (−1.7)	48.7 (9.3)
Mean minimum °F (°C)	12.4 (−10.9)	15.4 (−9.2)	21.4 (−5.9)	30.5 (−0.8)	41.4 (5.2)	56.9 (13.8)	63.2 (17.3)	60.8 (16.0)	47.4 (8.6)	32.1 (0.1)	20.4 (−6.4)	14.3 (−9.8)	8.5 (−13.1)
Record low °F (°C)	0 (−18)	−5 (−21)	8 (−13)	19 (−7)	31 (−1)	46 (8)	56 (13)	52 (11)	34 (1)	16 (−9)	10 (−12)	−10 (−23)	−10 (−23)
Average precipitation inches (mm)	0.95 (24)	1.19 (30)	1.48 (38)	2.04 (52)	3.18 (81)	3.28 (83)	2.05 (52)	2.83 (72)	2.46 (62)	2.00 (51)	1.38 (35)	0.97 (25)	23.81 (605)
Average snowfall inches (cm)	0.8 (2.0)	1.6 (4.1)	0.1 (0.25)	0.0 (0.0)	0.0 (0.0)	0.0 (0.0)	0.0 (0.0)	0.0 (0.0)	0.0 (0.0)	0.1 (0.25)	0.4 (1.0)	1.0 (2.5)	4.0 (10)
Average precipitation days (≥ 0.01 in)	3.1	3.9	4.6	4.4	6.7	6.5	4.5	5.4	5.0	4.7	3.2	3.4	55.4
Average snowy days (≥ 0.1 in)	0.6	0.5	0.1	0.0	0.0	0.0	0.0	0.0	0.0	0.1	0.3	0.5	2.1
Source: NOAA

== Demographics ==
Historical population
Census	Pop.	Note	%±
2010	160		—
2020	151		−5.6%
U.S. Decennial Census; 1850–1900 1910; 1920 1930 1940; 1950 1960 1970; 1980 1990 2000; 2010 2020

Guthrie was designated as a census designated place in the 2010 U.S. census.

Guthrie CDP, Texas – Racial and ethnic composition Note: the US Census treats Hispanic/Latino as an ethnic category. This table excludes Latinos from the racial categories and assigns them to a separate category. Hispanics/Latinos may be of any race.
Race / Ethnicity (NH = Non-Hispanic)	Pop 2010	Pop 2020	% 2010	% 2020
White alone (NH)	145	141	90.63%	93.38%
Black or African American alone (NH)	0	0	0.00%	0.00%
Native American or Alaska Native alone (NH)	1	0	0.63%	0.00%
Asian alone (NH)	0	0	0.00%	0.00%
Native Hawaiian or Pacific Islander alone (NH)	0	1	0.00%	0.66%
Other race alone (NH)	0	0	0.00%	0.00%
Mixed race or Multiracial (NH)	0	1	0.00%	0.66%
Hispanic or Latino (any race)	14	8	8.75%	5.30%
Total	160	151	100.00%	100.00%

As of the 2020 United States census, there were 151 people, 63 households, and 50 families residing in the CDP.

== Education ==
Guthrie is served by the Guthrie Common School District, which consistently ranks as a "recognized" school district by the Texas Education Agency.

== Notable people ==
- Max Williams - basketball player and coach; lived in Guthrie as a child.

== In popular culture ==
Author Mitch Cullin graduated from Guthrie School in 1986, and while the setting of his early writings was often the town of Claude in Armstrong County, Cullin said in interviews that his novels Whompyjawed and Branches were based on Guthrie.
