= Fir Island =

- Island
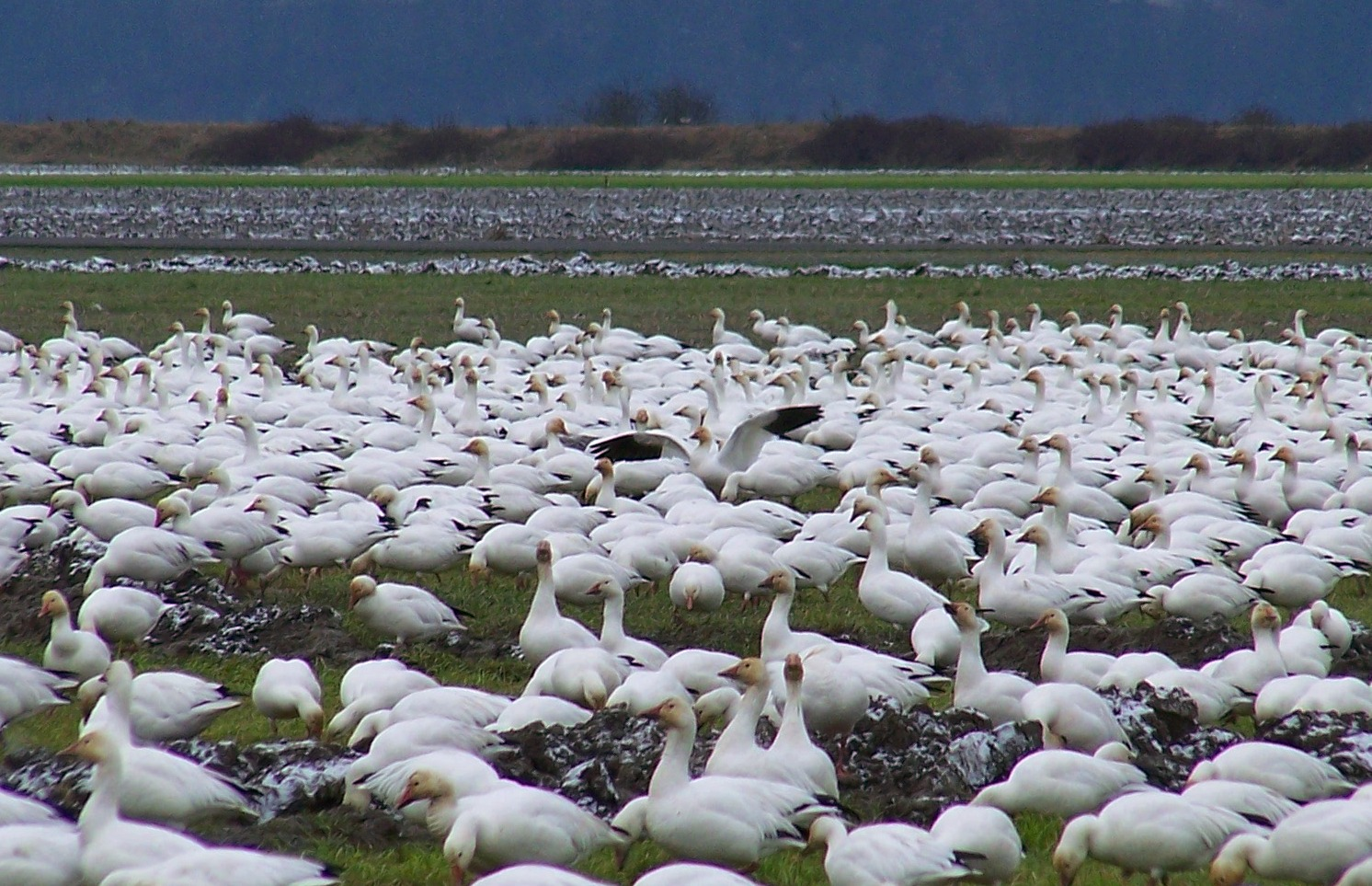
- Snow geese on Fir Island, Skagit River Delta

- Location within the state of Washington
- Coordinates: 48°21′N 122°23′W
- Country: United States
- State: Washington
- County: Skagit County
- Bodies of Water: Skagit River and Skagit Bay of Puget Sound

Area
  - Total: 15.5 sq mi (40 km^{2})
- Time zone: UTC−8 (PST)
  - Summer (DST): UTC−7 (PDT)

Fir Island is bounded by North and South Forks of the Skagit River and Skagit Bay of Puget Sound in the southwestern corner of Skagit County, Washington. Triangular in outline, 5.3 miles (8.5 km) east–west by 6.5 miles (10.5 km) north–south with an area of nearly 9,900 acres (40 km^{2}), Fir Island is occupied by 195 families. The island is connected by bridge to the village of Conway, located on the east shore of the South Fork of the Skagit River. A second bridge, across the North Fork of the Skagit River, leads to La Conner, 3.7 miles (6.0 km) northwest. Near the northeast tip of Fir Island is the site of the 19th-century town of Skagit City which declined after upstream log jams were removed in 1877.

== Natural history ==
A major component of the Skagit River Delta, the island is an important habitat for wildlife. Migrating from the northern portion of Wrangel Island in Russia, 30,000 to 70,000 snow geese spend the winter on the Skagit River Delta and the Fraser River Delta of British Columbia. Important internationally, this population and one that winters in California, are the only snow geese that migrate between Eurasia and North America and the only remnant still extant in Eurasia.

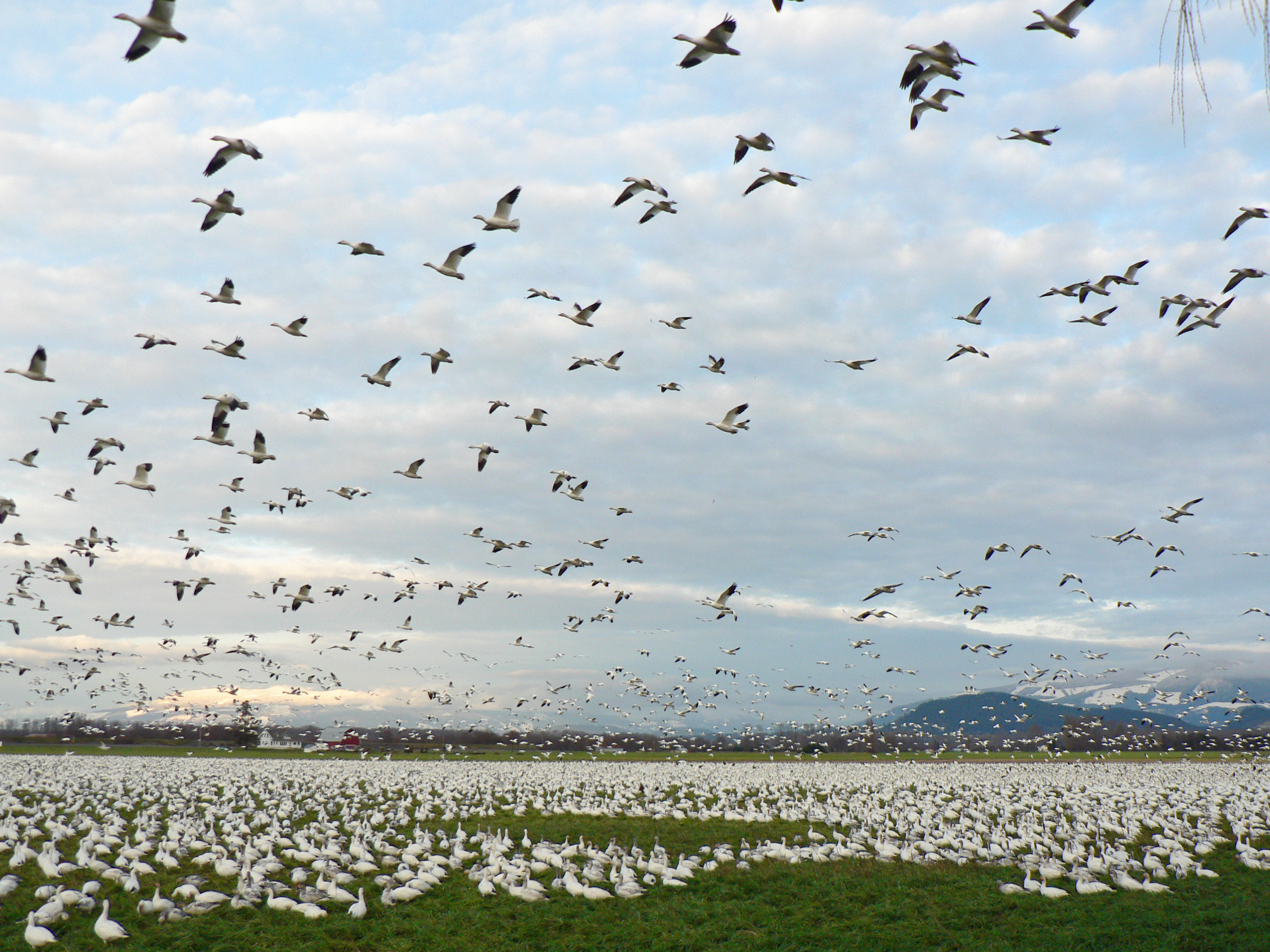
Snow geese feed in agricultural fields of Fir Island in the winter

Other migratory waterfowl include tundra swans, trumpeter swans and the bald eagle. Over the course of a year, 180 species of birds have been recorded at Skagit Wildlife Area, 13,000 acres (53 km^{2}) of mostly tidelands and intertidal marsh, the largest section of which is located on the southern margin of the island.

Near the south end of Fir Island, the Wiley Slough Restoration Project is intended to restore natural processes to a 180 acres (0.73 km^{2}) portion of Skagit Wildlife Area. The project includes removal of 6,500 feet (2,000 m) of existing dikes, construction of 6,500 feet (2,000 m) of new dikes, and construction of a new tide gate on Wiley Slough upstream of the existing one which will be removed. The main goal of the project is to increase the diversity of species that depend on estuaries, especially Puget Sound Chinook Salmon that are listed as threatened under the provisions of the Endangered Species Act. Despite opposition by hunters, the project is supported by many in the community and Governor Christine Gregoire.

== Skagit River floods ==
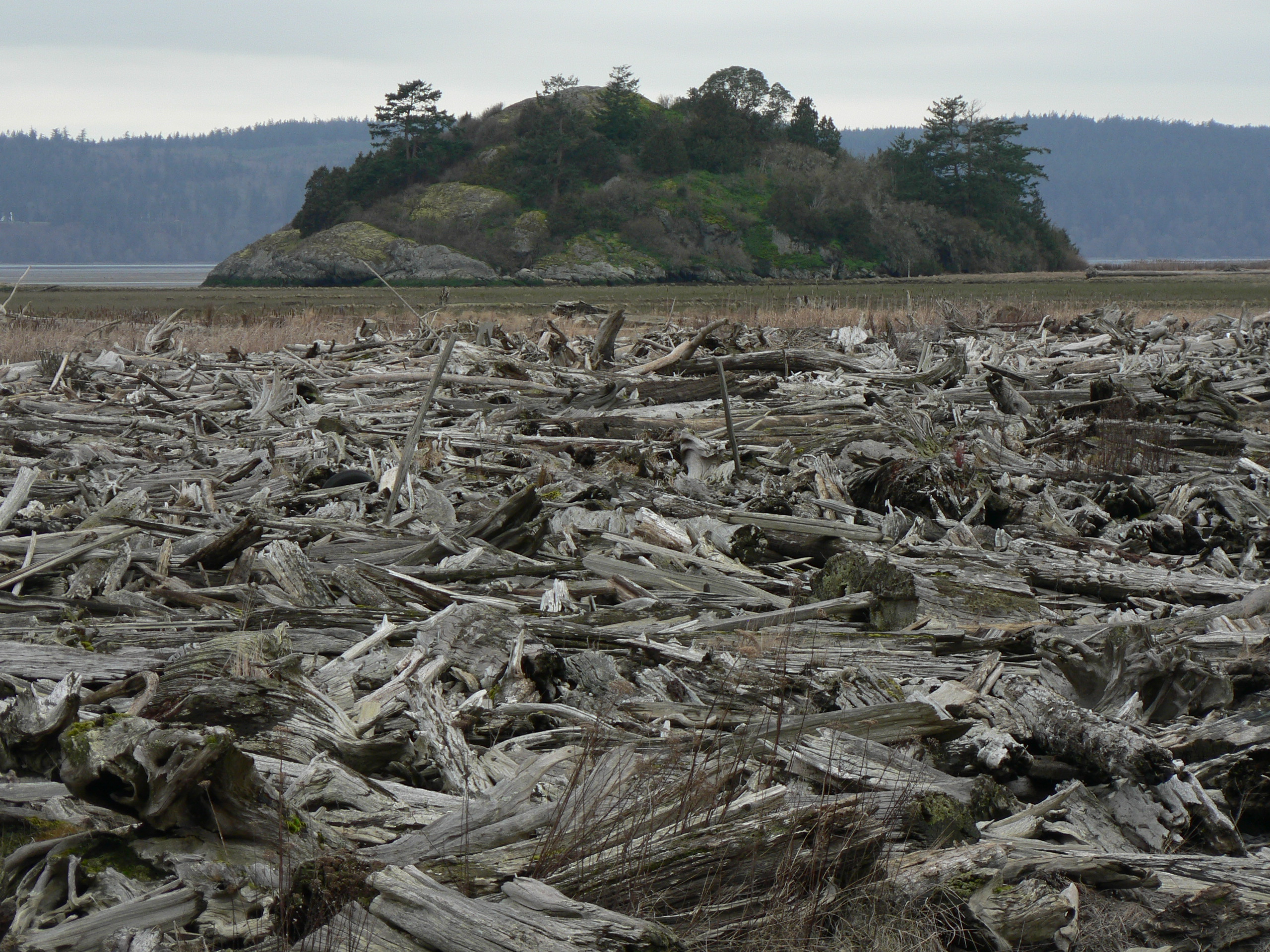
Driftwood deposited by Skagit River floodwaters on the Fir Island shore, with Craft Island in the background.

Fir Island is periodically flooded by the Skagit River.

On February 27, 1932 Fir Island flooded after a dike broke between Fir and Skagit City. A number of buildings were carried away by the river, and area farmers lost between 150 and 200 chickens, 4 head of cattle, and 8 or 10 sheep.

On November 25, 1990, the 152,000 cubic feet (4,300 m^{3}) per second flow of the Skagit River caused it to overtop its 10 feet (3.0 m) earthen dikes and the island was inundated. No human fatalities occurred but livestock deaths were reported. Dike repairs the following summer cost $7 million.

On October 21, 2003, a peak flow of 135,000 cubic feet (3,800 m^{3}) per second occurred when the Skagit River crested at more than 14 feet (4 m) above flood stage. A total of 3,400 people were evacuated from flood prone areas along the river. On November 8, 2006, in the aftermath of a strong Pineapple Express storm, a flow of 125,000 cubic feet (3,500 m^{3}) per second and a crest 8.2 feet (2.5 m) feet above flood stage were recorded. Such floods deposit great quantities of driftwood along river channels and on tidelands.
