= Guthrie High School =

Guthrie High School may refer to:

- Guthrie High School (Oklahoma)
- Guthrie High School (Texas)
