= The Post War Dream =

The Post War Dream may refer to:

- The Post-War Dream (novel), a 2008 novel by American author Mitch Cullin
- "The Post War Dream" (song), a song by Pink Floyd, from the album The Final Cut
