= Dumont, Texas =

Unincorporated community in King County, Texas, United States

- Unincorporated community
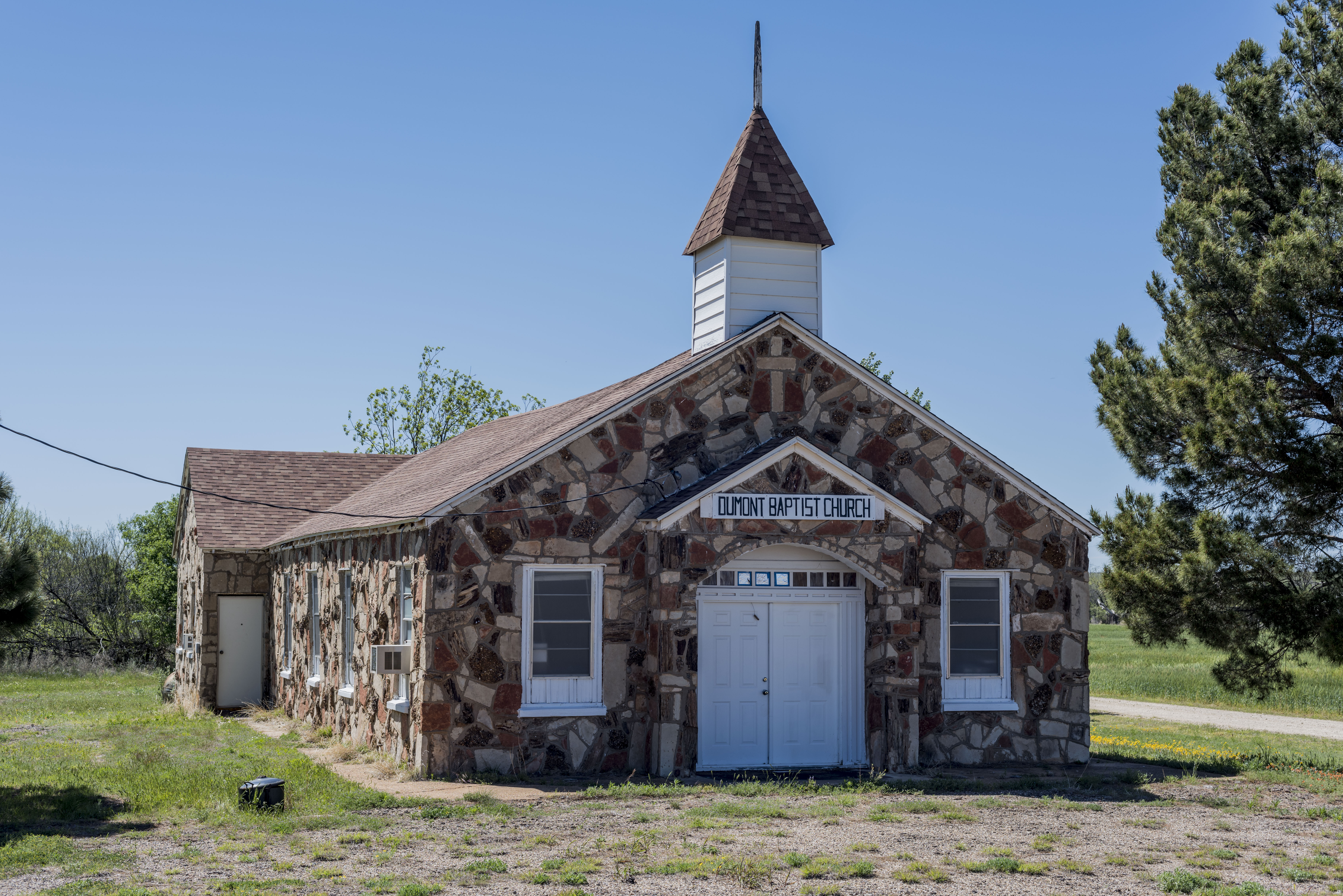
- Dumont Baptist Church, October 2019

- Location in Texas and the United States Dumont (the United States)
- Coordinates: 33°48′35″N 100°30′58″W
- Country: United States
- State: Texas
- County: King
- Elevation: 2,051 ft (625 m)

Population (2000 est.)
  - Total: 85
- Time zone: UTC-6 (Central (CST))
  - Summer (DST): UTC-5 (CDT)
- ZIP codes: 79232
- Area code: 806
- GNIS feature ID: 1356437

Dumont is an unincorporated community in King County, Texas, United States. It lies in the far northwestern corner of the county, near the Dickens County line. As of the 2000 census, its population was 85, making it the second-largest community in the sparsely populated county, behind the county seat of Guthrie.

== History ==
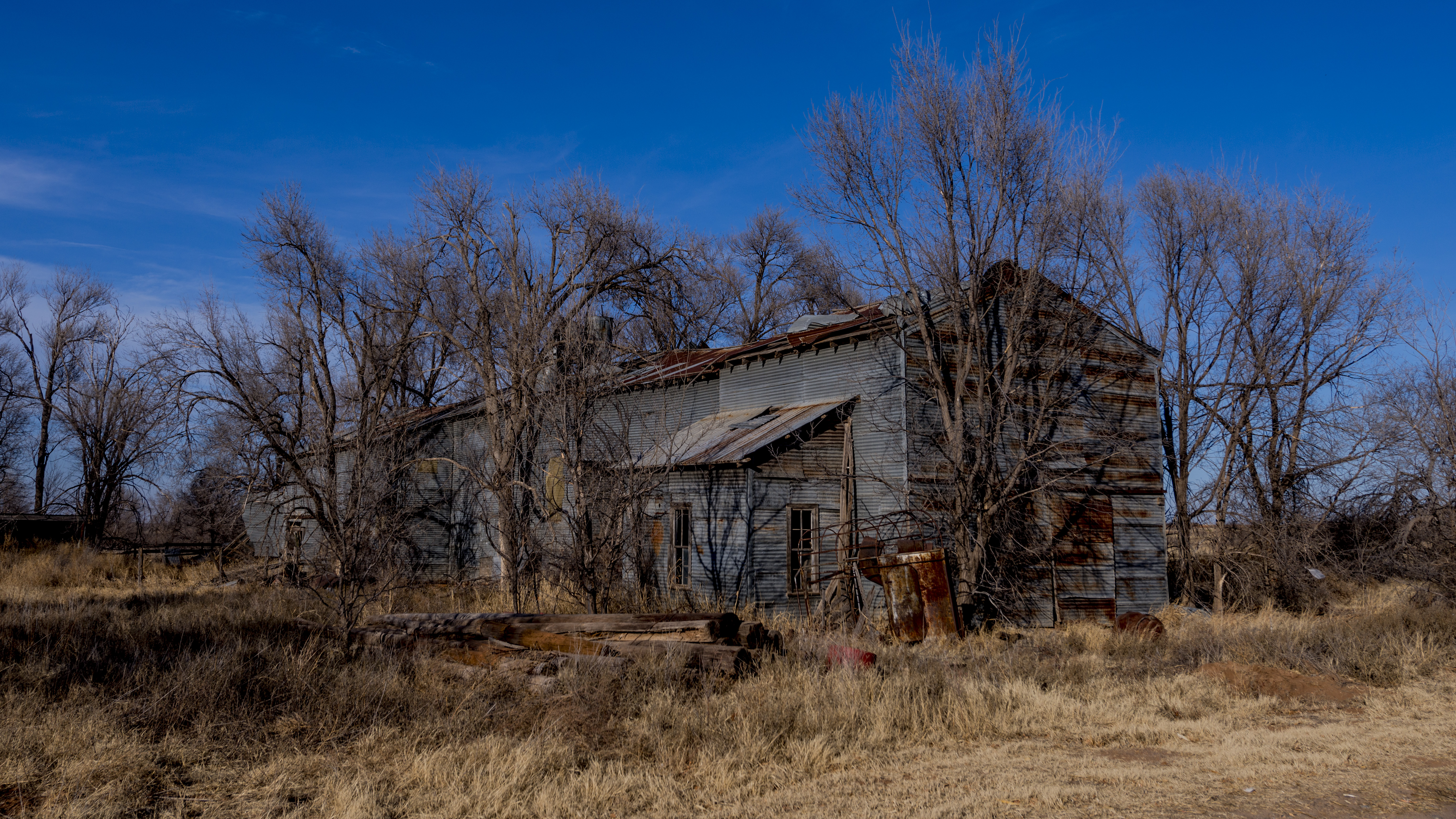
The abandoned Dumont Gin, February 2018

Dumont was founded sometime in the late 1880s and named after the first postmaster of the nearby community of Paducah. By 1896, three churches served Dumont's 550 or so residents, and in 1914, schools from two neighboring communities consolidated to form Dumont Independent School District #1, which remained intact until 1959, when it was consolidated with Guthrie schools.

Though it has served as a minor center for shipping and commerce for several area ranches, the town has never been highly populated, reaching a high mark of 105 residents in 1960. By 1980, this had fallen to 95, and in 1990, Dumont reportedly had three businesses in operation and a population of 85, a figure it maintained through to the 2000 census.

== Climate ==
According to the Köppen climate classification, Dumont has a semiarid climate, BSk on climate maps.

== Education ==
Dumont is served by the Guthrie Common School District.
