= Peter I. Chang =

Taiwanese film director

- Born: 1973 (age 52–53); Taiwan
- Occupations: Artist, illustrator and filmmaker
- Partner: Mitch Cullin

Peter I. Chang (born 1973) is a Taiwanese-born mixed-media artist, illustrator, and filmmaker. He has often collaborated with the author Mitch Cullin who is also his domestic partner.

In 2004, Chang and Cullin established Workshop Lo-Vi in order to "create quality film projects with little or no budget, utilizing as few accessories as possible, and cobbling the finished product together with tools/equipment that are easily available to anyone."

In a 2006 review of Chang's documentary Life in G-Chord, The Santa Fe New Mexican praised Chang's "simple camerawork" and the "whimsical touches" the director used in the film, further stating that "Chang makes good sense of the film’s endless supply of still photography and old footage through playful collage and editing."

Chang's digital short Regina Monologue, which features Cullin and was shot in Canada during the production of Terry Gilliam's Tideland, is included as an easter egg on Disc 2 of the UK DVD release of the film.

I Want to Destroy America, a documentary about the Japanese street musician Hisao Shinagawa, was officially released on DVD by Pathfinder Pictures in the summer of 2008.

In 2008, Chang's second full-length documentary Tokyo is Dreaming was completed, a non-narrative project that depicts Japan's capital during a 24-hour time period. The film received its world premiere at the 5th Berwick Film Festival in 2009. In an overview of the festival written in Empire, film critic David Parkinson described the film as "an astute and assured tableau that's compellingly counterpointed by a score by Calexico's John Convertino."

== Bibliography (as illustrator) ==
- Mitch Cullin (2002), UnderSurface, Art by Peter I. Chang., The Permanent Press, ISBN 978-1-57962-077-6

== Filmography ==
=== Features ===
- I Want to Destroy America (original title: Life in G-Chord) (2006); documentary
- Tokyo is Dreaming (2008); documentary

=== Shorts ===
- Regina Monologue (2007); available as an Easter egg (virtual) on the UK DVD of Terry Gilliam's Tideland
