= Tokyo Is Dreaming =

Tokyo is Dreaming
- Directed by: Peter I. Chang
- Produced by: Mitch Cullin
- Cinematography: Peter I. Chang; Mitch Cullin
- Edited by: Peter I. Chang
- Music by: John Convertino
- Distributed by: Workshop Lo-Vi
- Release date: 2008
- Running time: 68 minutes
- Country: United States
- Language: Japanese

Tokyo is Dreaming is a 2008 documentary film by Peter I. Chang which depicts life in the Japanese capital and is accompanied by a score from Calexico's John Convertino. As a non-narrative portrait of the bustling metropolis, the documentary is a modern-day take on the City Symphonies that flourished in early 20th Century cinema with films such as Man with a Movie Camera.

In a review of the film for the U.K.'s Empire, critic David Parkinson noted, "As a street performer juggling knives is escorted out of a park by a combination of keepers and the police, Chang crosscuts between images of a nationalist rally and newsreels from the Tojo militarist era and draws some chilling similarities. He also makes striking contrasts between a variety of futurist objects and Tokyo's modernist architecture, with the segment seeming to conclude that the steel and glass structures in which citizens spend so much of their lives have reduced them to goldfish floating without much cognisance in an aimless existence."

== Film festival screenings ==
Tokyo is Dreaming received its world premiere at the 5th Berwick Film Festival in 2009 and had its U.S. premiere at Phoenix Art Museum in May 2010.
