= I Want to Destroy America =

I Want to Destroy America: The Atomic Music of Hisao Shinagawa
- Directed by: Peter I. Chang
- Produced by: Mitch Cullin
- Starring: Hisao Shinagawa
- Cinematography: Peter I. Chang; Mitch Cullin; Masahiro Sugano
- Edited by: Peter I. Chang
- Music by: Hisao Shinagawa
- Distributed by: Pathfinder Pictures
- Release dates: 2006 (film festivals); June 3, 2008 (DVD)
- Running time: 66 minutes
- Country: United States
- Language: English

I Want to Destroy America is a documentary film by Peter I. Chang which traces the life of the Japanese musician Hisao Shinagawa through his early years as a folk singer in Tokyo to his current occupation as a street performer in Los Angeles.

The film was shot from 2004 to 2006, and provides a unique insight into the influence of Western popular music on the teenage youth culture of 1960s Japan, as well as an inside look at Shinagawa's struggle to survive as a songwriter after losing his recording contract in the 1980s. The title of the film comes from an off-hand comment Shinagawa makes about wanting to destroy the U.S. system.

In his review of the DVD release, critic John Wallis notes, "I Want to Destroy America is formatted with Hisao speaking for himself. Interview audio and footage is placed over still and stock footage and the modern footage, some of it fly-on-the-wall, some of it atmospherically staged," and concludes that the film is an "interesting portrait of an outsider artist who has lead [sic] an amazing life. Hisao Shinagawa is strange, passionate, and one of those people who lives his life on his own offbeat terms."

== Film festivals ==
Under its original title of Life in G-Chord, the film was submitted to and selected for the Atlanta Underground Film Festival and the Santa Fe Film Festival in 2006.

== DVD release ==
The film was acquired for DVD distribution by Pathfinder Pictures in 2007.

== DVD Specs ==
- Digital transfer, letterbox presentation
- Scene Index
  - Main Feature: I Want To Destroy America
    - 1. Chapter 1 [8:47]
    - 2. Chapter 2 [9:28]
    - 3. Chapter 3 [10:07]
    - 4. Chapter 4 [8:42]
    - 5. Chapter 5 [5:43]
    - 6. Chapter 6 [8:13]
    - 7. Chapter 7 [12:10]
    - 8. Chapter 8 [2:51]
- Extras
  - Outtakes
    - Alternate Ending
    - Jackson Browne
    - Hisao Speaks
    - That's What It Is
    - Hisao Sings
  - Soundtrack
    - Lovin' You (2005)
    - Yabara, Misumi, Nihon-kai (2002)
    - Rai (Reasons For) (1972)
    - Six Budda Statues (1979)
    - Give Me Water Please (1979)
    - What's Life For (1972)
    - To The North (1979)
    - Uta No Tame Ni Woody Guthrie (1972)
    - Oh My Love Yamato Nadeshiko (1979)
    - The God Hisao Shinagawa (1996)
    - Stray Dog (1979)
    - I Wish I Could Yodel (1979)
    - When The Roses Are Blooming (1979)
    - Wires (1984)
    - Happy Weirdo (1983)
    - More Money More War (1981)
    - Human Computer (1984)
    - Lonesome Buddha Statue (1992)
    - Baa Baa Baa (Me Me Me) (1999)
    - Rock 'N' Roll (2006)
    - Life In A G-Chord (1999)
  - Biographies
    - Director
    - Producer
  - Trailer
  - Still Gallery (Slideshow)
