= Milo Parker =

English actor (born 2002)

- Born: 4 October 2002 (age 23); Ipswich, Suffolk, England
- Education: Farlingaye High School Royal Holloway, University of London
- Occupation: Actor
- Years active: 2014–present
- Known for: Mr. Holmes, The Durrells and Miss Peregrine's Home for Peculiar Children

Milo Parker (born 4 October 2002) is an English film actor. He is known for his roles as Connor in Robot Overlords (2014), Roger Munro in Mr. Holmes (2015), Hugh Apiston in Miss Peregrine's Home for Peculiar Children (2016) and Gerry Durrell in ITV's The Durrells (2016–2019).

== Life and work ==
Milo Parker was born in Ipswich, Suffolk, England.

Parker trained at Youngblood Theatre Company and made his feature film debut in the British independent science fiction film Robot Overlords, before starring alongside Ian McKellen in Mr. Holmes, for which he earned nominations for the Critics' Choice Movie Award for Best Young Performer and 42nd Saturn Awards for Best Performance by a Younger Actor. In an interview for The Lady, McKellen praised his young co-star, saying "Milo was full of the esprit of a young person. He had no fear of the camera or of doing exactly what the director wanted when required." He attended Farlingaye High School in Woodbridge, Suffolk. He has since studied at Royal Holloway, University of London.

== Filmography ==
=== Film ===
Year	Title	Role	Notes
2014	Robot Overlords	Connor	
2015	Mr. Holmes	Roger Munro	
2015	Ghosthunters on Icy Trails	Tom Thompson	
2016	Miss Peregrine's Home for Peculiar Children	Hugh Apiston	
2017	McKellen: Playing the Part	Young Ian McKellen	Documentary
2024	Midas Man	Alistair Taylor	

=== Television ===
Year	Title	Role	Notes
2016–2019	The Durrells	Gerry Durrell	Main cast

=== Audio ===
Year	Title	Role	Notes
2021	Masterful	The Master	Big Finish Productions

== Awards and nominations ==
Year	Association	Nominated work	Category	Result	Ref(s)
2015	British Independent Film Awards	Mr. Holmes	Most Promising Newcomer	Nominated	
2016	Critics' Choice Movie Awards	Mr. Holmes	Best Young Actor/Actress	Nominated	
2016	London Film Critics' Circle Awards	Mr. Holmes	Young British/Irish Performer of the Year	Nominated	
2016	London Film Critics' Circle Awards	Robot Overlords	Young British/Irish Performer of the Year	Nominated	
2016	Online Film & Television Association	Mr. Holmes	Best Youth Performance	Nominated	
2016	Saturn Awards	Mr. Holmes	Best Performance by a Younger Actor	Nominated	
2016	TV Times Awards	The Durrells	Favourite Newcomer	Nominated	
2016	Young Artist Award	Mr. Holmes	Best Performance in a Feature Film – Supporting Young Actor (13 and under)	Nominated	
2018	Young Artist Award	The Durrells	Best Performance in a TV Series – Leading Teen Actor	Nominated	
