= UnderSurface =

2002 novel by Mitch Cullin

- Author: Mitch Cullin
- Illustrator: Peter I. Chang
- Publisher: Permanent Press
- Publication date: September 2002
- Pages: 166
- ISBN: 978-1-57962-077-6
- OCLC: 47644338
- Dewey Decimal: 813/.54 21
- LC Class: PS3553.U319 U53 2002
- Preceded by: From the Place in the Valley Deep in the Forest 2001
- Followed by: A Slight Trick of the Mind 2005

UnderSurface is the sixth book by American author Mitch Cullin with illustrations by Peter I. Chang. It was first published in September 2002 as a hardback edition from The Permanent Press.
