= Branches (novel) =

2000 novel by Mitch Cullin

- First edition
- Author: Mitch Cullin
- Language: English
- Publisher: Permanent Press
- Publication date: 2000
- ISBN: 1-57962-061-2 (first edition)
- Dewey Decimal: 813.54
- LC Class: PS3553.U319 B72

Branches is a novel-in-verse by American author Mitch Cullin, with illustrations by the Japanese artist Ryuzo Kikushima. It is the second installment of the writer's Texas Trilogy that also includes the coming-of-age football novel Whompyjawed and the surrealistic novel Tideland.

In a 2000 interview with the Austin Chronicle, Cullin stated that his first novel Whompyjawed was a more accurate reflection of West Texas while Branches, he was quoted as saying, "is kind of, maybe to a fault, what other people who haven't really been there might think it's like."

Branches was first published in March 2000 as a hardcover edition from Permanent Press.
