= A Slight Trick of the Mind =

2005 novel by Mitch Cullin

- Author: Mitch Cullin
- Publisher: Nan A. Talese/Doubleday
- Publication date: April 2005
- Pages: 253
- ISBN: 0-385-51328-3
- Preceded by: UnderSurface (2002)
- Followed by: The Post-War Dream (2008)

A Slight Trick of the Mind is the seventh book by American author Mitch Cullin.

== Plot ==
In 1947, the 93-year-old Sherlock Holmes lives in retirement at a small farmhouse in the English countryside, attended by his housekeeper Mrs. Munro. He is unable to walk without a pair of canes, and he pursues various natural remedies to combat his failing memory. Holmes spends much of his time on beekeeping, having set up an apiary on the property, and he begins to teach Mrs. Munro's son Roger about the practice.

The story shifts between three narratives:

- Holmes' attempt to recall the true details of the last case he investigated before deciding to retire 35 years earlier.
- His recent visit to Japan to meet with Tamiki Umezaki, a man who believed that Holmes could solve the mystery of why his father traveled to England and never returned.
- The time he spends with Roger, and the rift that forms between Holmes and Mrs. Munro after the boy's sudden death in an attack by a swarm of wasps.

== Releases ==
It was first published in April 2005 as a hardcover edition from Nan A. Talese/Doubleday, and during the same month an unabridged audiobook version read by Simon Jones was released on both compact disc and cassette by Highbridge Audio. A trade paperback edition was published in May 2006 by Anchor Books/Random House.

== Awards ==
The audiobook edition by Mitch Cullin won the Audio Publishers Association's 2006 Audie Award for Unabridged Fiction.

== Film adaptation ==
On 5 September 2013, it was announced that the book would be adapted into a film with Ian McKellen as Holmes. Bill Condon would direct, and Jeffrey Hatcher would adapt the screenplay. The film was released on 19 June 2015 under the title Mr. Holmes.

=== Copyright Dispute ===
The Conan Doyle Estate filed legal action against Mitch Cullin and the companies producing the film on May 21, 2015, alleging unauthorized copying of copyrighted stories by Arthur Conan Doyle that cover the later life of Sherlock Holmes. All parties reached an agreement out of court before the release of the film in the United States, and later editions of the novel now include a note thanking the estate for permission to use copyrighted material.
