= Ghosthunters: On Icy Trails =

- Theatrical release poster
- Directed by: Tobi Baumann
- Screenplay by: Tobi Baumann; Murmel Clausen; Mike O'Leary; Martin Ritzenhoff; Roland Slawik; Christian Tramitz
- Based on: Ghosthunters and the Incredibly Revolting Ghost! by Cornelia Funke
- Produced by: Boris Ausserer; Jacqueline Kerrin; Tommy Pridnig; Oliver Schündler; Peter Wirthensohn; Dominic Wright
- Starring: Anke Engelke; Milo Parker
- Cinematography: Thomas W. Kiennast
- Edited by: Alexander Dittner
- Music by: Ralf Wengenmayr
- Production companies: Lucky Bird Pictures; Immer Wieder Gerne Film; Lotus Film; Ripple World Pictures; Warner Bros. Film Productions Germany; Fish Blowing Bubbles
- Distributed by: Warner Bros. Pictures (Germany and Austria)
- Release dates: 2 April 2015 (Germany); 3 April 2015 (Austria)
- Running time: 99 minutes
- Countries: Germany; Austria; Ireland
- Languages: German; English

Ghosthunters: On Icy Trails (German: Gespensterjäger - Auf eisiger Spur) is a 2015 comedy horror film directed by Tobi Baumann and starring Anke Engelke, Milo Parker and the voice of Bastian Pastewka. It is based on the novel Ghosthunters and the Incredibly Revolting Ghost! By Cornelia Funke.

== Cast ==
- Anke Engelke as Hetty Cumminseed
- Milo Parker as Tom Thompson
- Christian Tramitz as Gregory Smith
- Karoline Herfurth as Hopkins
- Christian Ulmen as Phil Thompson
- Julia Koschitz as Patricia Thompson
- Bastian Pastewka as Hugo (voice)

== Reception ==
The film has a 17% rating on Rotten Tomatoes. Tara Brady of The Irish Times gave it two stars out of five. Mike McCahill of The Guardian also gave the film two stars out of five.
