= Mr. Holmes =

2015 British-American mystery film

- Theatrical release poster
- Directed by: Bill Condon
- Screenplay by: Jeffrey Hatcher
- Based on: A Slight Trick of the Mind by Mitch Cullin
- Produced by: Anne Carey; Iain Canning; Emile Sherman
- Starring: Ian McKellen; Laura Linney; Hiroyuki Sanada; Milo Parker
- Cinematography: Tobias A. Schliessler
- Edited by: Virginia Katz
- Music by: Carter Burwell
- Production companies: AI Film; BBC Films; FilmNation Entertainment; Archer Gray Productions; See-Saw Films
- Distributed by: Entertainment One (United Kingdom); Miramax; Roadside Attractions (United States)
- Release dates: 7 February 2015 (Berlinale); 19 June 2015 (United Kingdom); 17 July 2015 (United States)
- Running time: 104 minutes
- Countries: United Kingdom; United States
- Language: English
- Budget: $10 million (est.)
- Box office: $29.4 million

Mr. Holmes is a 2015 mystery film directed by Bill Condon, based on Mitch Cullin's 2005 novel A Slight Trick of the Mind, and featuring the character Sherlock Holmes. The film stars Ian McKellen as Sherlock Holmes, Laura Linney as his housekeeper Mrs. Munro and Milo Parker as her son Roger. Set primarily during his retirement in Sussex, the film follows a 93-year-old Holmes who struggles to recall the details of his final case because his mind is slowly deteriorating.

Principal photography began on 5 July 2014, in London. The film was screened out of competition at the 65th Berlin International Film Festival and had its premiere on 7 February 2015.

The film was released in British cinemas on 19 June 2015, and in the United States on 17 July 2015.

== Plot ==
In 1947, the long-retired Sherlock Holmes, aged 93, lives in a rural Sussex farmhouse with his widowed housekeeper Mrs Munro and her young son Roger. Having just returned from a trip to Hiroshima, Holmes starts to use a prickly ash plant he acquired there to try to improve his failing memory. Unhappy about Watson's fictionalisation of his last case, The Adventure of the Dove Grey Glove, he hopes to write his own account, but has trouble recalling the events. As Holmes spends time with Roger, showing him how to take care of the bees in the farmhouse's apiary, he comes to appreciate Roger's curiosity and intelligence and develops a paternal liking for him.

Over time, Roger's prodding helps Holmes remember the case (shown in flashbacks); he knows he must have failed somehow, as it resulted in his retirement from the detective business. Almost 30 years earlier, after the First World War had ended and Watson had married and left Baker Street, Thomas Kelmot approached Holmes to find out why his wife Ann had become estranged from him after suffering two miscarriages. Holmes followed Ann around London and observed her seemingly preparing to murder her husband – forging cheques in her husband's name and cashing them, confirming the details of his will, buying poison, paying a man, and checking train schedules. Holmes, however, deduced her true intentions: to have gravestones made for her and her miscarried children (the man she paid was a stonemason) and then kill herself. Confronting her, Holmes confessed he had the same feelings of loneliness and isolation, but his intellectual pursuits sufficed for him. Ann asked Holmes if they could share the burden of their loneliness together. Holmes was tempted, but instead advised her to return to her husband. She poured the poison on the ground, thanked Holmes, and departed. Holmes later learned that Ann succeeded in killing herself by stepping in front of an oncoming train. Blaming himself, he retired and fell into a deep depression. Watson briefly returns to care for him and, discovering the details of the case, rewrites the tragedy into a success.

A second series of flashbacks recounts Holmes' recent trip to Japan, where he met a supposed admirer named Tamiki Umezaki who had told him of the benefits of prickly ash. In fact, Umezaki brought Holmes to Japan in order to confront him. Years before, Umezaki's father had gone to England on business and never returned; he had sent a letter explaining that Holmes had persuaded him to remain there and forget his family in Japan. To Umezaki's disappointment, Holmes told him bluntly that his father probably just wanted a new life for himself and that he had never met the man.

In the present, Mrs Munro grows discontented with her work as Holmes becomes infirm and burdensome to look after. His closeness to her son Roger is another source of tension, as the boy is becoming dissatisfied with his family's lowly status and increasingly distant from his barely literate mother. Mrs Munro accepts a job at a hotel in Portsmouth, and plans to take Roger to work there as well. Roger is unenthused by the prospect of hotel drudgery and unwilling to leave Holmes, and says as much to his mother. Later, Holmes discovers Roger lying unconscious in the garden, covered in insect stings. As the boy is rushed to hospital, Mrs Munro accuses Holmes of caring for nothing but himself and his bees, and prepares to burn the apiary. Holmes stops her, having realised that the culprits are actually wasps; Roger had found a nearby nest and tried to flood it in order to protect the apiary, but the wasps swarmed on him instead. Holmes and Mrs Munro burn the nest together, then return to the hospital as Roger regains consciousness. As they sit in the waiting room, Holmes tells Mrs Munro that he was too fearful and selfish to open himself up to Ann Kelmot and to give her the comfort that she needed. He wants her and Roger to stay in his life, and tells her that they will inherit his estate after his death.

Back home, Holmes writes his first work of fiction: a letter to Umezaki, telling him that his father was a brave, honourable man who worked secretly and effectively for the British Empire. As Roger begins to teach his mother how to care for the bees, Holmes emulates a tradition he saw practised in Hiroshima: creating a ring of stones to serve as a place where he can recall the loved ones he has lost over the years.

== Cast ==
- Ian McKellen as Sherlock Holmes
- Laura Linney as Mrs. Munro
- Milo Parker as Roger
- Hiroyuki Sanada as Tamiki Umezaki
- Roger Allam as Dr. Barrie
- Frances de la Tour as Madame Schirmer
- Hattie Morahan as Ann Kelmot
- Phil Davis as Inspector Gilbert
- Patrick Kennedy as Thomas Kelmot
- John Sessions as Mycroft Holmes
- Nicholas Rowe as Matinee "Sherlock Holmes"
- Frances Barber as Matinee "Madame Schirmer"

== Production ==
On 5 September 2013, it was announced that Mitch Cullin's 2005 book A Slight Trick of the Mind would be adapted into a film, with Ian McKellen as a long-retired Sherlock Holmes. Bill Condon was set to direct Jeffrey Hatcher's adaptation of the novel. AI-Film was on board to finance and co-produce the film, Anne Carey was set to produce through her Archer Gray Productions, Iain Canning and Emile Sherman would produce through See-Saw Films, and BBC Films would also co-finance the film. Filmnation Entertainment was set to handle the international sales for the film.

On 7 May 2014, Laura Linney and Hattie Morahan were added to the cast, with Linney set to play Mrs Munro, the housekeeper to Holmes. On 9 July Hiroyuki Sanada was added to the cast to play Matsuda Umezaki, a prickly ash plant enthusiast whom Holmes visits in Japan. On 10 July, more cast were revealed, including Patrick Kennedy, Roger Allam, Phil Davis, Frances de la Tour, with Milo Parker to play Mrs Munro's son. On 22 August it was revealed that Nicholas Rowe, who portrayed Holmes in the 1985 film Young Sherlock Holmes, would have a cameo role in the film. He portrays Holmes in a sequence spoofing the Basil Rathbone Sherlock Holmes films. On 3 September 2014, Miramax acquired distribution rights to the film in the United States with Roadside Attractions as partner.

=== Filming ===
Principal photography began on 5 July 2014 in the United Kingdom. On 9 July, McKellen tweeted a picture of himself as Sherlock Holmes in the film. The film was set for a seven-week shoot on location in London and on the south coast of England. The production also filmed at The Historic Dockyard Chatham which doubled as streets in Japan.

=== Music ===
Carter Burwell composed the music for the film. The soundtrack was released on 28 August 2015.

=== Copyright dispute ===
The Conan Doyle Estate filed legal action against the creators of the film on May 21, 2015, alleging unauthorized copying of copyrighted stories by Arthur Conan Doyle that cover the later life of Sherlock Holmes. All parties reached an agreement out of court before the release of the film in the United States, and later editions of the novel on which the film is based now include a note thanking the estate for permission to use copyrighted material.

== Release ==
The film had its premiere at the 65th Berlin International Film Festival on February 7, 2015. It was released in British cinemas on 19 June 2015 and in the United States on 17 July 2015. It was released on DVD and Blu-ray on 13 October 2015.

== Reception ==
=== Box office ===
Mr. Holmes grossed $17.7 million domestically (United States and Canada) and $11.6 million in other territories, for a worldwide total of $29.4 million, against an estimated budget of $10 million. It peaked at No. 9 in its second weekend, its second of two weeks in the Top 10 at the domestic box office.

=== Critical response ===
On the review aggregator website Rotten Tomatoes, 88% of 184 critics' reviews are positive, with an average rating of 7.1/10. The website's consensus reads: "Mr. Holmes focuses on the man behind the mysteries, and while it may lack Baker Street thrills, it more than compensates with tenderly wrought, well-acted drama." Metacritic, which uses a weighted average, assigned the film a score of 67 out of 100, based on 35 critics, indicating "generally favorable" reviews. Audiences polled by CinemaScore gave the film an average grade of "A−" on an A+ to F scale.

IGN awarded it a score of 7.7 out of 10, saying "Gentle, moving, diverting drama that's perfect Sunday afternoon fare".

=== Accolades ===
Award	Category	Recipient	Result
British Independent Film Awards	Most Promising Newcomer	Milo Parker	Nominated
Indiana Film Journalists Association Awards	Best Film		Nominated
Indiana Film Journalists Association Awards	Best Supporting Actress	Laura Linney	Nominated
Indiana Film Journalists Association Awards	Best Actor	Ian McKellen	Nominated
San Francisco Film Critics Circle	Best Actor	Ian McKellen	Nominated
Saturn Awards	Best Thriller Film		Nominated
Saturn Awards	Best Performance by a Younger Actor	Milo Parker	Nominated
St. Louis Gateway Film Critics Association	Best Actor	Ian McKellen	Runner-up
Sydney Film Festival	Audience Award	Bill Condon	Nominated
