= King County, Texas =

County in Texas, United States

- County
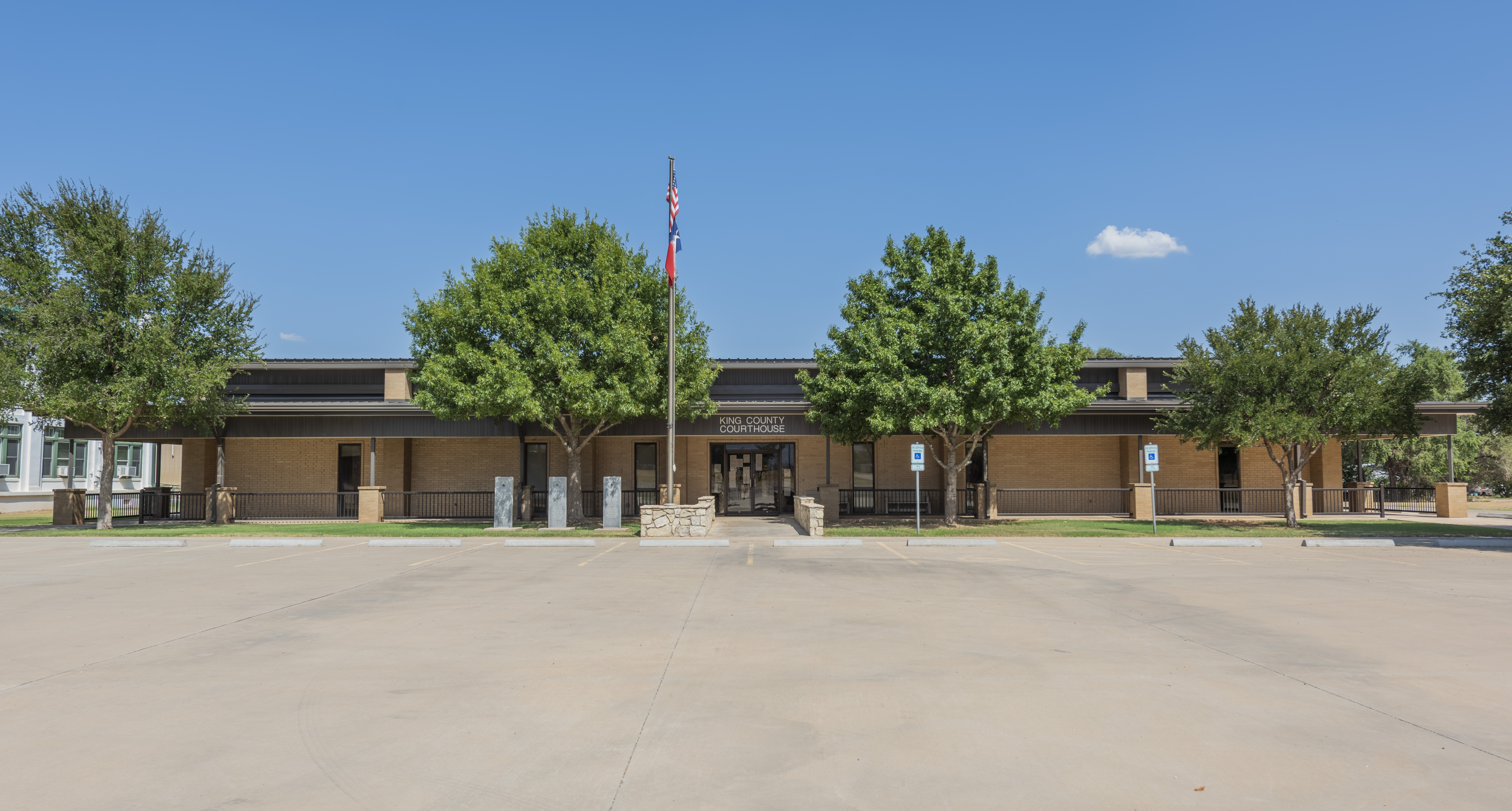
- King County Courthouse in Guthrie

- Location within the U.S. state of Texas
- Coordinates: 33°37′N 100°15′W
- Country: United States
- State: Texas
- Founded: 1891
- Named for: William Philip King
- Seat: Guthrie
- Largest community: Guthrie

Area
  - Total: 913 sq mi (2,360 km^{2})
  - Land: 911 sq mi (2,360 km^{2})
  - Water: 2.5 sq mi (6.5 km^{2}) 0.3%

Population (2020)
  - Total: 265
  - Estimate (2025): 192 ▼
  - Density: 0.29/sq mi (0.11/km^{2})
- Time zone: UTC−6 (Central)
  - Summer (DST): UTC−5 (CDT)
- Congressional district: 13th
- Website: www.co.king.tx.us

King County is a county located in the U.S. state of Texas. Its population was 265 at the 2020 census, making it the second-least populated county in Texas and the third-least populated county in the United States. King County has no incorporated communities. Its county seat is the census-designated place (CDP) of Guthrie. The county was created in 1876 and organized in 1891. It is named for William Philip King, who died at the Battle of the Alamo.

== History ==
=== Native Americans ===
The Apache and Comanche were early tribes in the area. The Red River War of 1874-1875 was a United States Army campaign to force the removal of Natives in Texas and their relocation to reservations, to open the region to White settlers.

=== County established ===
On August 21, 1876, the Texas Legislature formed King County from Bexar County. By 1880, the United States Census counted 40 residents in the county. In 1891, the county was organized. Guthrie was designated as the county seat.

Early ranchers preserved water by damming canyons and draws to hold the heavy spring rains. In the 1890s, windmills became the method of water provision. Some of the earliest settlers were Isom Lynn, A. C. Tackett, Brants Baker, and Bud Arnett. The Four Sixes Ranch was established in 1902 by Samuel Burk Burnett. The formerly named Pitchfork Land and Cattle Company was organized in 1883, and SMS ranches were established during the same time frame. The 6666 (called Four Sixes Ranch), also founded in 1883, was managed from 1965 to 1986 by George Humphreys, who was also affiliated with the National Ranching Heritage Center in Lubbock.

Dumont was formed in the late 19th century. By that time, farmers began to share the land with ranchers. Cotton was the leading crop for a time, followed by corn, sorghum, and fruit trees.

Oil was discovered in the county in 1943. By January 1, 1991, almost 114,403,000 barrels (18,188,600 m^{3}) of oil had been pumped from King County lands since the first wells were drilled.

== Geography ==
According to the United States Census Bureau, the county has a total area of 913 square miles (2,360 km^{2}), of which 2.5 sq mi (6.5 km^{2}) (0.3%) are covered by water. Much of the land in King County Texas is Grassland, and hilly, broken country, much of which is composed of dark loam and red soils. The county has a temperate climate with mild winters and hot summers with temperatures ranging from an average of −3 °C (27 °F) in January to 37 °C (99 °F) in July. The county has an average annual rainfall of 550 millimetres (21.6 inches).

=== Major highways ===
- U.S. Highway 82 / State Highway 114
- U.S. Highway 83
- State Highway 222
- Spur 729

=== Adjacent counties ===
- Cottle County (north)
- Foard County (northeast)
- Knox County (east)
- Stonewall County (south)
- Dickens County (west)
- Haskell County (southeast)

== Demographics ==
Historical population
Census	Pop.	Note	%±
1880	40		—
1890	173		332.5%
1900	490		183.2%
1910	810		65.3%
1920	655		−19.1%
1930	1,193		82.1%
1940	1,066		−10.6%
1950	870		−18.4%
1960	640		−26.4%
1970	464		−27.5%
1980	425		−8.4%
1990	354		−16.7%
2000	356		0.6%
2010	286		−19.7%
2020	265		−7.3%
2025 (est.)	192	▼	−27.5%
=U.S. Decennial Census; 1850–2010 2010-2020

=== 2020 census ===
As of the 2020 census, the county had a population of 265. The median age was 38.1 years. 28.7% of residents were under the age of 18 and 14.3% of residents were 65 years of age or older. For every 100 females there were 86.6 males, and for every 100 females age 18 and over there were 89.0 males age 18 and over.

The racial makeup of the county was 91.3% White, <0.1% Black or African American, <0.1% American Indian and Alaska Native, <0.1% Asian, 1.5% Native Hawaiian and Pacific Islander, 2.6% from some other race, and 4.5% from two or more races. Hispanic or Latino residents of any race comprised 9.4% of the population.

<0.1% of residents lived in urban areas, while 100.0% lived in rural areas.

There were 108 households in the county, of which 39.8% had children under the age of 18 living in them. Of all households, 63.0% were married-couple households, 14.8% were households with a male householder and no spouse or partner present, and 16.7% were households with a female householder and no spouse or partner present. About 25.0% of all households were made up of individuals and 12.0% had someone living alone who was 65 years of age or older.

There were 171 housing units, of which 36.8% were vacant. Among occupied housing units, 38.9% were owner-occupied and 61.1% were renter-occupied. The homeowner vacancy rate was <0.1% and the rental vacancy rate was 2.8%.

=== Racial and ethnic composition ===
King County, Texas – Racial and ethnic composition Note: the US Census treats Hispanic/Latino as an ethnic category. This table excludes Latinos from the racial categories and assigns them to a separate category. Hispanics/Latinos may be of any race.
Race / Ethnicity (NH = Non-Hispanic)	Pop 2000	Pop 2010	Pop 2020	% 2000	% 2010	% 2020
White alone (NH)	315	242	230	88.48%	84.62%	86.79%
Black or African American alone (NH)	0	0	0	0.00%	0.00%	0.00%
Native American or Alaska Native alone (NH)	4	1	0	1.12%	0.35%	0.00%
Asian alone (NH)	0	0	0	0.00%	0.00%	0.00%
Pacific Islander alone (NH)	0	0	4	0.00%	0.00%	1.51%
Other race alone (NH)	0	0	0	0.00%	0.00%	0.00%
Multiracial (NH)	3	4	6	0.84%	1.40%	2.26%
Hispanic or Latino (any race)	34	39	25	9.55%	13.64%	9.43%
Total	356	286	265	100.00%	100.00%	100.00%

=== 2000 census ===
As of the 2000 census, 356 people, 108 households, and 88 families were residing in the county. The population density was 0.39 people per square mile (0.15 people/km^{2}). The 174 housing units had an average density of 0.19 units per square mile (0.073/km^{2}). The racial makeup of the county was 94.10% White, 1.12% Native American, 3.09% from other races, and 1.69% from two or more races. About 9.55% of the population were Hispanics or Latinos of any race.

Of the 108 households, 41.7% had children under 18 living with them, 79.6% were married couples living together, 1.9% had a female householder with no husband present, and 17.6% were not families. About 16.7% of all households were made up of individuals, and 1.9% had someone living alone who was 65 or older. The average household size was 2.77 and the average family size was 3.12.

In the county, the age distribution was 33.7% under 18, 3.7% from 18 to 24, 29.5% from 25 to 44, 22.8% from 45 to 64, and 10.4% who were 65 or older. The median age was 37 years. For every 100 females, there were 95.6 males. For every 100 females 18 and over, there were 100.0 males.

The median income for a household in the county was $35,625, and for a family was $36,875. Males had a median income of $21,389 versus $30,179 for females. The per capita income for the county was $12,321. 20.70% of the population and 17.90% of families were below the poverty line. Out of the total people living in poverty, 23.0% are under 18 and 31.6% are 65 or older.

== Politics ==
King County was once a strongly Democratic county even by Solid South standards. In 1948, 95.85% of voters supported Harry S. Truman, in 1960, 76.9% of voters chose John F. Kennedy, and in 1964, 84.1% of voters supported Lyndon Johnson. The county also voted for Hubert Humphrey by a plurality in 1968, with 48.7% supporting Humphrey, while 31.7% voted for George Wallace, and a mere 19.6% voted for Richard Nixon.

However, the county has shifted strongly Republican since the 1980s, and is now almost unanimously Republican. The last Democratic presidential nominee to win over 20% of the vote in King County was Bill Clinton in 1996. In 2016, by percentage of votes, it was the second-most Republican county in the entire country, only being surpassed by Roberts County, Texas.

In the 2004 presidential election, 87.8% (137 votes) supported incumbent U.S. President George W. Bush, a Republican, whereas only 11.5% (18 votes) backed the Democratic challenger, U.S. Senator John Kerry.

In the 2008 presidential election, 92.6% supported the Republican, Senator John McCain, whereas only 4.9% backed the Democrat, Senator Barack Obama. Of all United States counties, King had the largest percentage of support for McCain.

In the 2012 presidential election, President Obama fared even worse in King County. His Republican challenger, Mitt Romney, received 139 votes in the county (95.9% of the county's total votes in the presidential election), while President Obama received only five votes — 3.4% of the total. That percentage was the smallest percentage that President Obama received in any county in the United States in 2012.

In addition, in the 2012 Democratic presidential primaries (in which President Obama faced no serious opposition nationwide), King County was one of two counties that voted for Bob Ely over President Obama. Only seven votes were cast in the Democratic presidential primary in King County that year. Ely won four of them, while Obama and two other minor candidates won one each.

In the 2016 presidential election, former Secretary of State Hillary Clinton continued the downward trend. Her Republican challenger, Donald Trump, received 149 votes in the county (93.7%), while Secretary Clinton received only five votes — 3.1% of the total. Libertarian Party candidate Gary Johnson also received five votes.

In 2020, Trump did even better, earning 95% of the vote, while Joe Biden slightly improved on Clinton's margin, earning eight votes for 5%. No votes for third-party candidates were cast. Biden's 5% of the vote was the highest percentage of the vote a Democrat has received in King County since 2004, when John Kerry took 11.5%. Kerry remains the last Democrat to receive at least a double-digit number of votes in the county.

In 2024, Trump improved his margins again, garnering 95.6% of the vote. This made King County the third-most Republican county in Texas by vote share, narrowly behind Roberts and Borden.

United States presidential election results for King County, Texas
Year	Republican		Democratic		Third party(ies)	
Year	No.	%	No.	%	No.	%
1912	2	2.44%	77	93.90%	3	3.66%
1916	3	6.00%	47	94.00%	0	0.00%
1920	0	0.00%	157	98.13%	3	1.88%
1924	4	4.60%	83	95.40%	0	0.00%
1928	85	65.38%	45	34.62%	0	0.00%
1932	4	1.75%	224	98.25%	0	0.00%
1936	13	5.80%	211	94.20%	0	0.00%
1940	23	7.96%	266	92.04%	0	0.00%
1944	13	5.08%	228	89.06%	15	5.86%
1948	6	2.49%	231	95.85%	4	1.66%
1952	66	25.88%	189	74.12%	0	0.00%
1956	46	20.54%	177	79.02%	1	0.45%
1960	39	22.54%	133	76.88%	1	0.58%
1964	34	15.89%	180	84.11%	0	0.00%
1968	44	19.64%	109	48.66%	71	31.70%
1972	143	65.30%	75	34.25%	1	0.46%
1976	96	48.73%	100	50.76%	1	0.51%
1980	144	70.24%	55	26.83%	6	2.93%
1984	141	72.68%	53	27.32%	0	0.00%
1988	111	63.43%	64	36.57%	0	0.00%
1992	79	41.80%	54	28.57%	56	29.63%
1996	97	53.30%	46	25.27%	39	21.43%
2000	120	87.59%	14	10.22%	3	2.19%
2004	137	87.82%	18	11.54%	1	0.64%
2008	151	92.64%	8	4.91%	4	2.45%
2012	139	95.86%	5	3.45%	1	0.69%
2016	149	93.71%	5	3.14%	5	3.14%
2020	151	94.97%	8	5.03%	0	0.00%
2024	129	95.56%	6	4.44%	0	0.00%

United States Senate election results for King County, Texas1
Year	Republican		Democratic		Third party(ies)	
Year	No.	%	No.	%	No.	%
2024	129	96.27%	5	3.73%	0	0.00%

United States Senate election results for King County, Texas2
Year	Republican		Democratic		Third party(ies)	
Year	No.	%	No.	%	No.	%
2020	149	96.75%	5	3.25%	0	0.00%

Texas Gubernatorial election results for King County
Year	Republican		Democratic		Third party(ies)	
Year	No.	%	No.	%	No.	%
2022	100	97.09%	3	2.91%	0	0.00%

In the 2012 U.S. Senate election, Republican candidate Ted Cruz received 117 votes (amounting to 95.9% of the county's total vote), while Democratic candidate Paul Sadler received 4 votes, or 3.3 percent of the total.

In the 2014 U.S. Senate election, Republican incumbent Senator John Cornyn received 87 votes (amounting to 96.7% of the county's total vote), while Democratic candidate David Alameel received 1 vote or 1.1 percent of the total. Libertarian Party candidate Rebecca Paddock received 2 votes or 2.2 percent of the total.

In the 2014 Texas gubernatorial election, Republican candidate Greg Abbott received 90 votes (amounting to 96.8% of the county's total vote), while Democratic candidate Wendy Davis received 1 vote or 1.1 percent of the total. Libertarian Party candidate Kathie Glass received 2 votes or 2.2 percent of the total.

Republican James Frank, a businessman from Wichita Falls, has since January 2023 represented King County in the Texas House of Representatives as the representative for House District 69. King County was previously represented by then-Representative (now Senator) Drew Springer, Jr., and briefly by David Spiller after Springer's successful election to the Texas Senate. Republican Charles Perry represents King County and Senate District 28.

== Economy ==
The primary industries are raising beef cattle (since the late 19th century), and oil production (since 1943). Corn and cotton are the leading planted farm crops.

== Communities ==
- Dumont
- Finney
- Grow
- Guthrie (county seat; also a CDP)

== Education ==
School districts serving sections of the county include:

- Crowell Independent School District
- Guthrie Common School District

The county is in the service area of Vernon College.

== Gallery ==
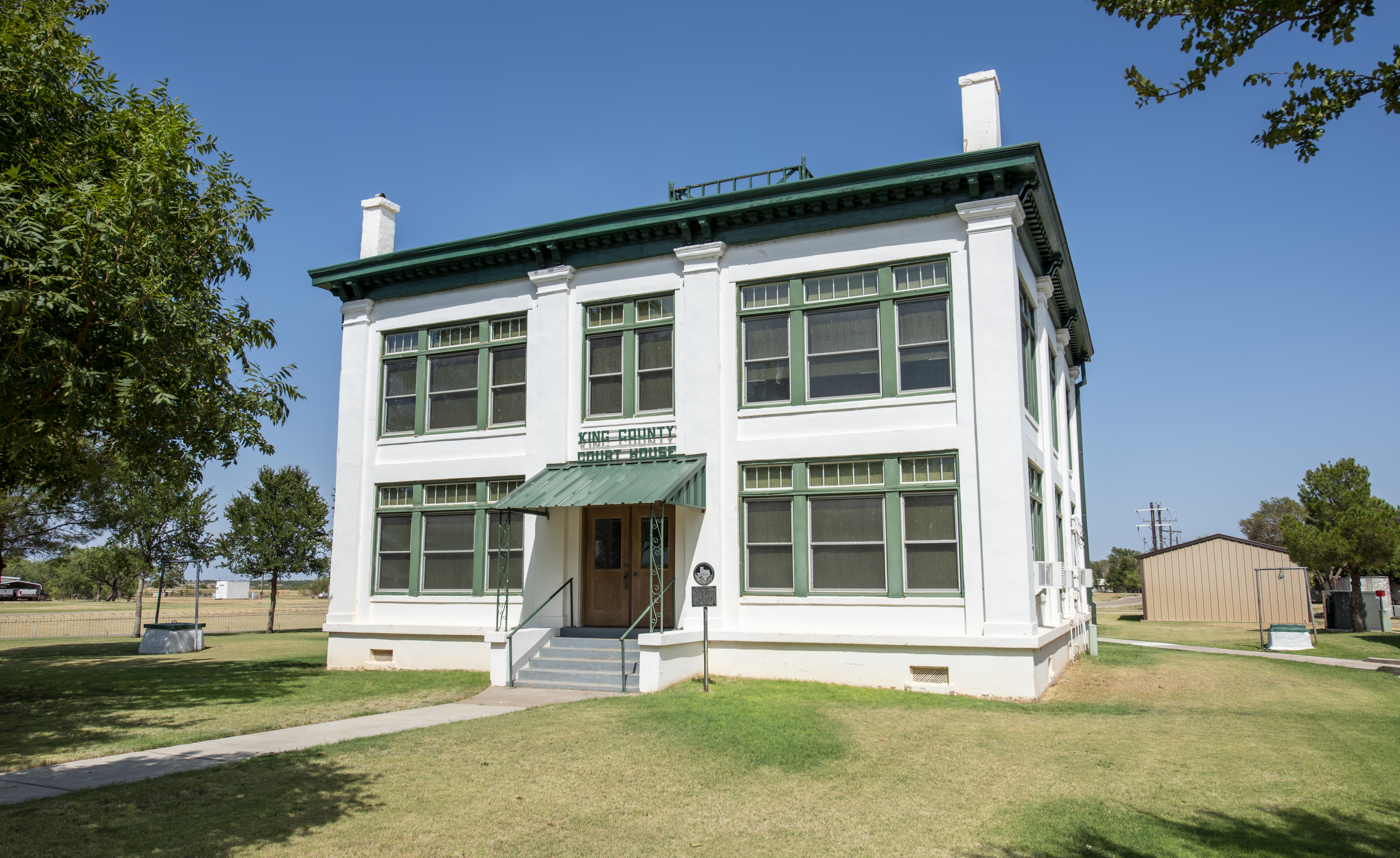
1914 King County Courthouse

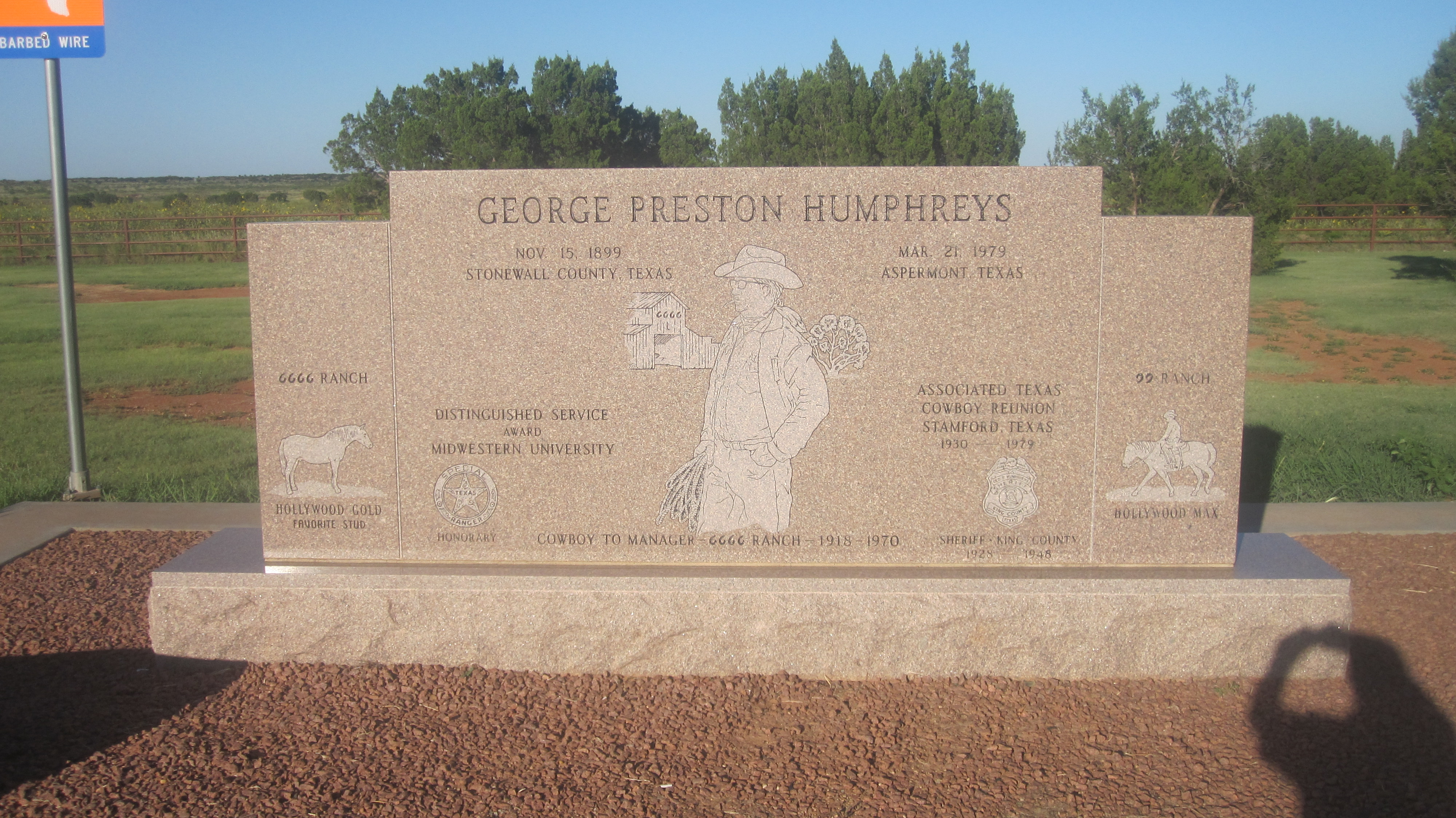
Monument off U.S. Highway 83 to George Preston Humphreys (1899-1979), the manager of the 6666 Ranch, who also served as King County sheriff from 1928 to 1948

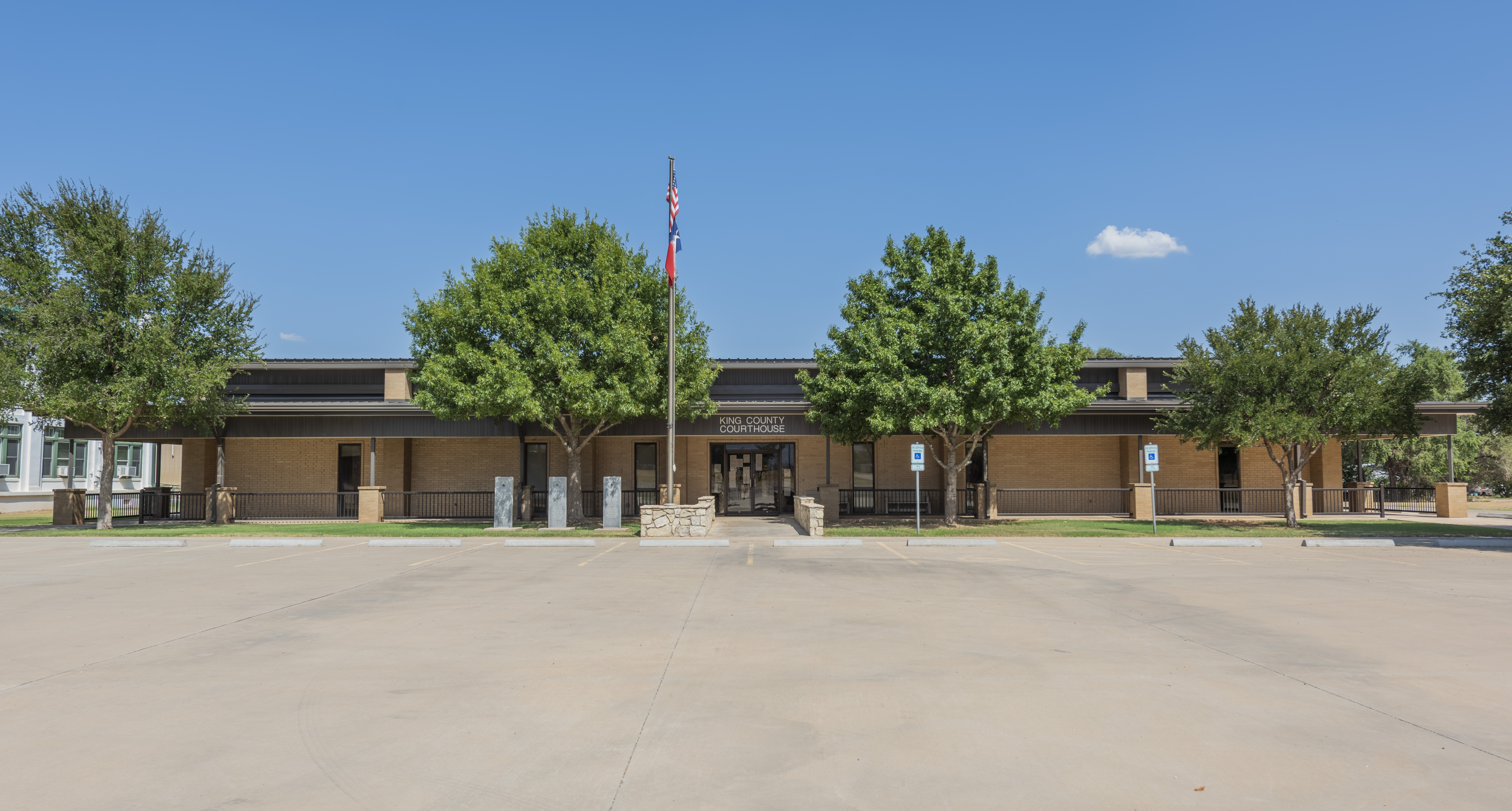
King County Courthouse in August 2020

== See also ==
- Recorded Texas Historic Landmarks in King County
