= Skagit City, Washington =

Ghost town in Washington (state)

- Ghost town
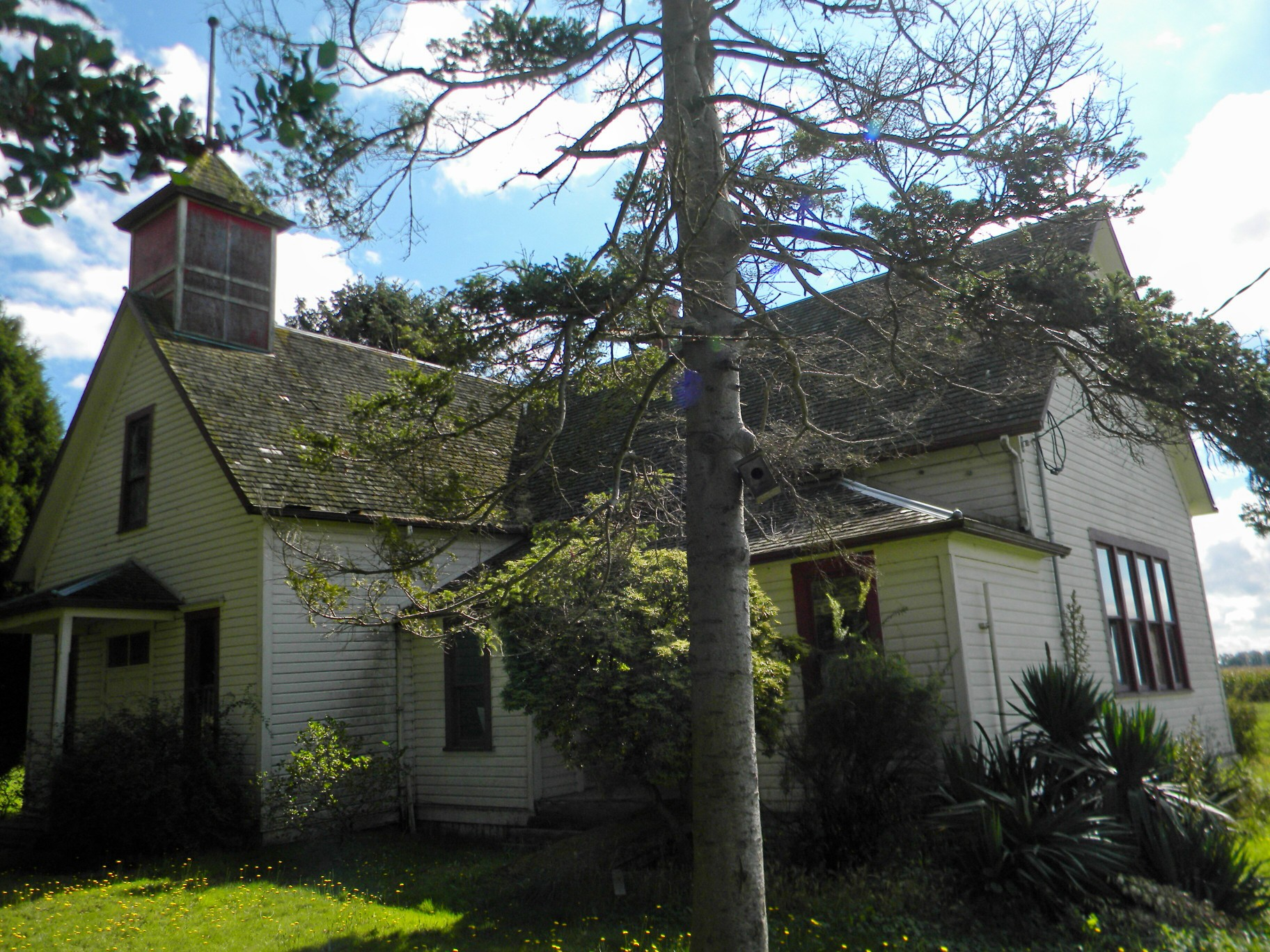
- Skagit City School, one of the few remnants of Skagit City. Photographed, 2013

- Location within Washington (state) Location within the United States
- Coordinates: 48°23′00″N 122°21′47″W
- Country: United States
- State: Washington
- County: Skagit
- Settled: 1868
- Time zone: UTC-8 (Pacific (PST))
  - Summer (DST): UTC-7 (PDT)

Skagit City was a town on the western bank of the South Fork Skagit River, less than a mile southeast of where the river forks north and south, in the U.S. state of Washington. The Barker's Trading Post along the river, opened in 1869, was partially or fully responsible for drawing people to settle at the townsite, which became an important river transportation center during the late 1800s, most notably in 1872. The city prospered until shortly before the 1880s, after river access to the upstream community of Mount Vernon, Washington was established and Mount Vernon began to prosper. By 1906, only one business remained in the entire town, and soon after World War II the town disappeared entirely.

The unincorporated community of Cedardale is the closest community to the former townsite at 2.4 miles (3.9 km) distance, and the name "Skagit City" has become simply a placename on the northeastern tip of Fir Island near where two distributaries diverge and carry Skagit River water into Skagit Bay, which branches off the Strait of Juan de Fuca. Skagit City is sometimes confused with the nearby tiny hamlet of Skagit Forks, which was just to the northwest at the divergence of the North and South Forks of the Skagit River. The town played an integral part in the settlement of Skagit County.

== First settlement ==
The first settlement in the Skagit River forks area was in 1868, when a small trading post was established there by a man named John Campbell. The Barker's Trading Post, established by John Barker in 1869, was a trading post near the divergence of the Skagit River into two distributaries named the North Fork and the South Fork. While the South Fork was navigable, the North Fork was the smaller channel that flowed into marshes, estuaries, and sloughs in the northern part of the delta of the Skagit River. Two huge logjams, which often included tree trunks longer than 100 feet (30 m), a short distance upriver impeded navigation further upstream, which diverted water traffic to the trading post rather than to upstream communities. This series of logjams was later destroyed, allowing ships to travel further upstream, which also spelled the end for Skagit City.

Shortly after the settlement of the region began, the first noted murder in the region occurred at a point between late 1869 and early 1870. The person killed was John Barker, and initial suspicions led to the hanging of two Indians as it was reported that a group of Native Americans had set up camp on the bank of the North Fork Skagit River directly across from the fledgling town. Later investigations led to suspicion of a nearby resident, Quimby Clark, who fled the area before he could be questioned. Eventually, it was determined that "the store showed plainly that the robbery and murder had been committed by a white man, for things which Indians would have taken were left and those which a white man would have taken were gone."

Notably, John Campbell once journeyed upriver along the Skagit on an 1874 canoe trip. It was said that one night, he had "slipped off" into the forest across the river. His disappearance went unnoticed until the whole party was awakened by "piercing blood-curling shrieks", and it was later discovered that it was in fact Campbell himself, "shrieking over and over the name of a local Skagit River Indian, 'Ted-auh-an'." The owner of the LaConner hotel, John P. McGlinn, was known to later say that the incidence was a case of "religious dementia". They did not continue upriver, and Campbell was tricked into returning to Skagit City by a false letter by James O'Loughlin, the owner of a tin shop in the settlement.

== Peak ==
In and around its roughly 1872 economic peak, Skagit City provided a sheltered harbor for sternwheelers on trade routes stemming from the city of Seattle and running to smaller settlements in the southern Puget Sound. The 100-foot (30 m) sternwheeler Fanny Lake, which played a key part in the settlement of the Skagit Forks area, as well as Skagit City and the nearby town of LaConner, was the first ship to begin this route, though different sources cite this ship as being either launched in 1874 or having begun the route in 1874, having previously served on different Northwest routes. The ship sank on May 21, 1883, when it hit a riffle in the Skagit River locally known as "Dead Man's Riffle". Although its superstructure was destroyed in the collision, it was refloated in 1889 by Joshua Green and partners, who had founded the La Conner Trading and Transportation Company. Over the next decade, Fanny Lake was responsible for the rapid growth and settlement of the Skagit Forks.

...the wonderfully rapid development of the resources of the river in all its business interests; to say nothing of its extraordinary rapid increase in population, caused by the great number of new settlers, coming into the valley for homes on each trip of the Fanny Lake [Sternwheeler].

-The Skagit River Journal, circa 1877

The town was said to be a typical "river town"; a long, narrow settled area stretching along a levee along the Skagit River. Businesses were built facing the river, in a row running along the levee road facing the river. A ferry and many other boats would dock in the extensive harbor of Skagit City, which occupied a wide and deep river channel. At its height, the city had many public buildings among its shops and houses, which included a church, hotels, a school, and a saloon. The aforementioned Fanny Lake was also used for transportation of grains and hay in the Skagit Forks area. In 1893, the Fanny Lake was destroyed for the second and final time when it caught fire and sank in Sullivan Slough.

== Decline ==
The decline of the town of Skagit City began in the 1870s when the two logjams clogging the Skagit River and blocking traffic upstream of the Skagit Forks were removed. The removal of the logs allowed the upstream community of Mount Vernon, Washington to prosper, while Skagit City gradually lost its residents and businesses. The demolition of the logjam, known as the Skagit Jam, began in the fall of 1874 when General Michler of the U.S. Army Corps of Engineers studied the possibility of opening a channel through the logjam. The jams, which covered roughly 2 miles (3.2 km) of the river, ranged in width from 1,000 feet (300 m) in the upper jam to 500 feet (150 m) in the lower jam. There were also a series of obstacles, presumably including sandbars, submerged rocks, and others, laid out between the two logjams.

...the lower jam, a channel had to be cut one-fourth of a mile long, through logs wedged in as tightly as possibly for water to wedge them, from the bottom of the river to the surface, and many 20 feet above the surface, and from bank to bank; with mud and sand in many places on the surface of the jam ten feet deep, and trees growing on it ten inches in diameter. They had to slash and [unreadable] the forest of young trees on the jam, before they could commence sawing and getting out he logs and rubbish of the jam proper.

Then when all the logs on the surface were sawed off and rolled into the water some six successive layers would rise to the surface that had to be treated in a similar manner. In this way a channel one hundred and fifty to two hundred feet wide was cut through solid mass of logs averaging from 30 to 40 feet high for one-fourth of a mile long. This part of the work, the removal of the lower jam, was finished in September 1876, since which time the town of Mt. Vernon and several logging camps have sprung into existence above it. Between the main jams were sufficient obstacles to require nearly one quarter of a mile of cutting before the upper jam was really reached; this took until March 1877. This part left in a body, blocking up the courses of the river, so that steamers could not enter until it was removed, which took about two months of their time. Work on the upper jam was commenced in May 1877. In clearing the lower river, five or six men had been employed for a short time so as to interfere as little as possible with its navigation. That is nearly all the extra help ever employed.

-Eldridge Morse, The Northern Star, 12 June 1878

Throughout 1877, floods on the Skagit River tearing through the newly excavated channels carried away more and more logs from the slowly dissipating jams. By late 1877, the logjam blocking the mouth of the Skagit River had been entirely destroyed.

The clearing of the logjams led to the increased settlement of Mount Vernon, approximately 3 miles (4.8 km) upstream of Skagit City. It was said that "the older town gradually began to decline, losing its business houses to Mount Vernon one by one." The town slowly faded in importance until, by 1906, only one business remained—a two-story general store owned by Daniel E. Gage, which stayed in business until the early 1910s.

== Modern times ==
Although the town of Skagit City faded in importance as the upriver towns of Mount Vernon and others grew, there was a large influx of settlers to the northern tip of Fir Island in the 1880s and a school in that area became necessary by 1888. Before the old Skagit City school was erected, students had walked to the school in the Fir district to the south or to the Wilbur School on the farm of John Wilbur, or they crossed the river to the Kelly School, named for the pioneer R.L. Kelly and located upslope from the eastern shore of the river on the Peter Egtvet farm.

After the floodwaters of 1887 damaged the Kelly school, the new Skagit County created School District 3 on the east side of the river and Skagit City District 57 School was erected in 1888 on the near present-day Stackpole Road on higher ground a little north of the Kelly School. The new school was close enough to the water that it was undermined by floodwaters in 1901. This led the families to choose a 1/2-acre location on the Knute Lange farm (later known as the Vernal Lee farm) on higher ground west and away from the South Fork. The old Skagit City School still stands at 17508 Moore Road; it served the area from 1902-1940 and Ronald Holttum bought the building and property in 1943.

== See also ==
- List of ghost towns in Washington
