= Tideland =

2000 novel by Mitch Cullin

- Author: Mitch Cullin
- Language: English
- Publisher: Dufour Editions
- Publication date: August 28, 2000
- Publication place: United States
- Media type: Print (hardcover)
- Pages: 192
- ISBN: 0-8023-1335-3
- OCLC: 43694283
- Dewey Decimal: 813/.54 21
- LC Class: PS3553.U319 T53 2000
- Preceded by: Branches 2000
- Followed by: The Cosmology of Bing 2001

Tideland is the third published book by author Mitch Cullin, and is the third installment of the writer's Texas Trilogy that also includes the coming-of-age novel Whompyjawed and the novel-in-verse Branches.

== Plot summary ==
The story is a first-person narrative told by the young Jeliza-Rose, detailing the summer she spent alone at an isolated, rundown farmhouse in Texas called What Rocks. With only the heads of old Barbie dolls to keep her company, Jeliza-Rose embarks on a series of highly imagined and increasingly surreal adventures in the tall grass surrounding the farmhouse.

== Publication history ==
Tideland was first published in the United States in 2000 by Dufour Editions.

== Reception ==
The book received major notices upon publication, including a review from New York Times Book Review which wrote that the novel was "brilliant and beautiful." Terry Gilliam and film producer Jeremy Thomas called the novel a modern hybrid of Psycho and Alice's Adventures in Wonderland. A subsequent United Kingdom paperback edition followed in 2003 from Weidenfeld & Nicolson, with Gilliam's infamous blurb on the cover: "F*cking wonderful!"

In 1999, Cullin sent a pre-publication galley to Gilliam for a cover blurb, but Gilliam so liked what he read that he optioned the book with an eye to direct. The controversial film version was produced by Gabriella Martinelli and Jeremy Thomas for Capri Films and Recorded Picture Company, and was directed by Gilliam and shot in Canada in 2004. Cullin was given a brief cameo in the movie and contributed lyrics to the soundtrack, and the name "M. Cullin" appears on the mailbox at the farmhouse where much of the film takes place. The script adaptation was written by Gilliam and screenwriter Tony Grisoni.

== See also ==
- Fantasy
- Southern Gothic
- Southern literature
- Speculative Fiction
