= Hisao Shinagawa =

Japanese-born songwriter and performer (born 1946)

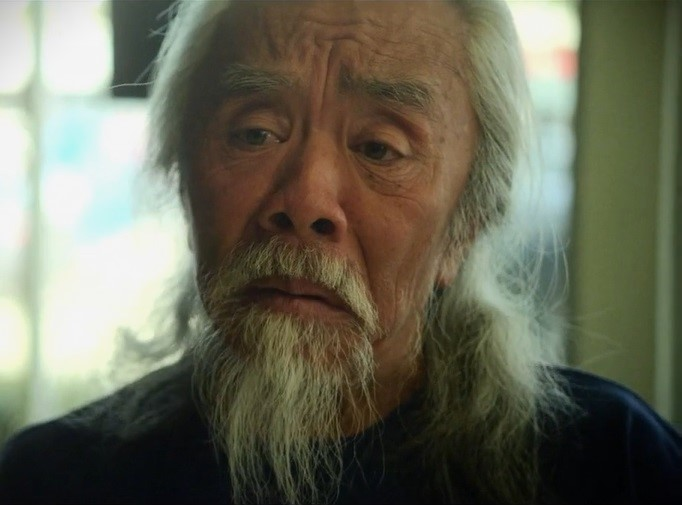
Shinagawa in 2014 short film Pike and Bird.

Hisao Shinagawa (born 1946) is a Japanese-born songwriter and performer who lives in Los Angeles, California. He is probably best known in his adopted home country for the satirical song "More Money, More War", which became an underground hit after the video aired on "Weird Al" Yankovic's Al TV on MTV in 1984.

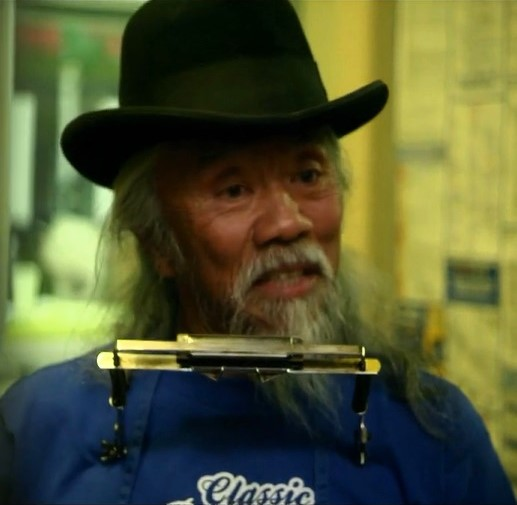
Shinagawa in 2014 short film Pike and Bird.

Director Masahiro Sugano's 1997 short film HISAO documented Shinagawa's daily life. The short was nominated for several awards, including a Student Academy Award and IFC2000.

In 2008, Pathfinder Pictures officially released I Want to Destroy America, Peter I. Chang's full-length documentary about Shinagawa's life. The film was initially known as Life in G-Chord and was shown at several film festivals, including the Atlanta Underground Film Festival.
