= Craft Island =

Island in Skagit Bay, Washington, USA

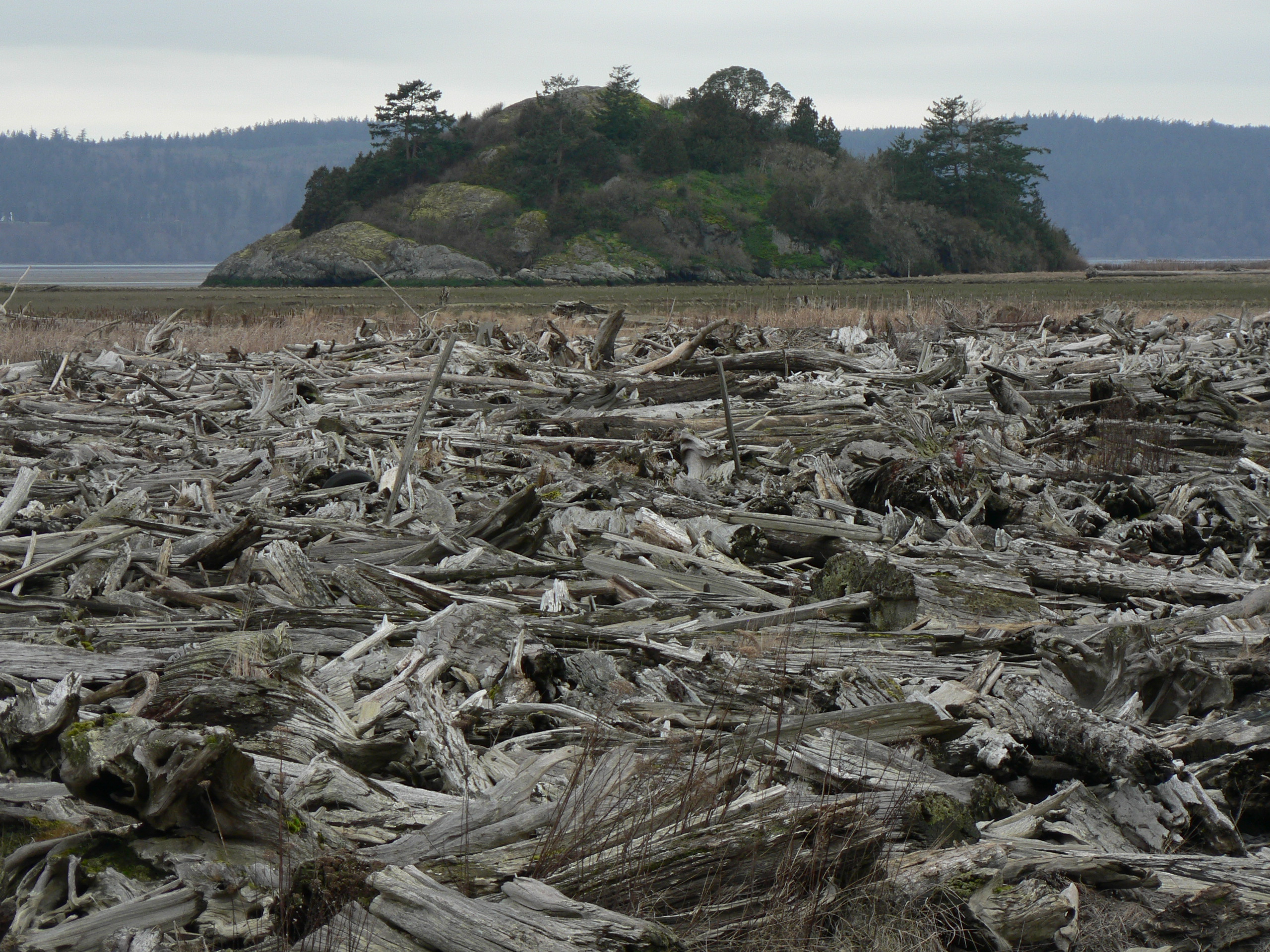

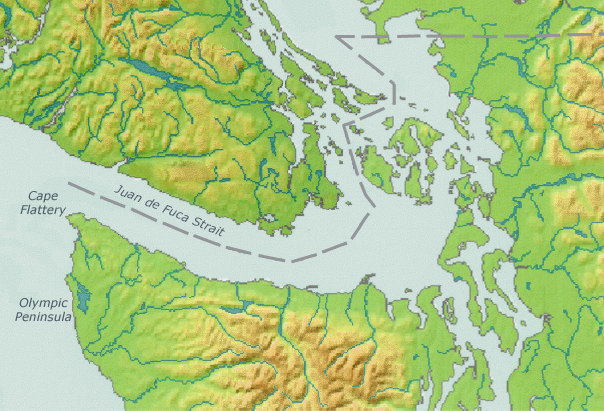
- Location within Strait of Juan de Fuca Location within Washington (state)

Geography
- Location: Skagit Bay, Puget Sound, Washington, United States
- Coordinates: 48.390°N 122.513°W
- Area: 0.16 sq mi (0.41 km^{2})
- Highest elevation: 80 ft (24 m)

Administration
- United States
- State: Washington
- County: Skagit County

Additional information
- Time zone: Pacific Standard Time (UTC-8)
  - Summer (DST): Pacific Daylight Time (UTC-7)

Craft Island is a small island located in Skagit Bay, part of the larger Puget Sound in Washington State, United States. It covers an area of approximately 0.16 square miles (0.41 km^{2}) and is situated in Skagit County.

== Geography ==
Craft Island is a low-lying island with a maximum elevation of 80 feet (24.4 m).. The island is situated within Skagit Bay, which is a part of the larger Puget Sound in Washington State.

== Hiking ==
Craft Island offers a short hike with picturesque views of the Skagit flats, Skagit Bay, the Cascades to the east, the Olympics to the west, and Rainier to the south. Hikers can follow a meandering route that avoids the flat marshland, which may contain ditches and holes, and pass through a small grove of trees on the island. Upon reaching the other side, visitors are rewarded with expansive views of the Olympic Mountains.

== Name Origin ==
The origins of the name "Craft Island" remain unknown. In 1962, the U.S. Board on Geographic Names selected "Craft Island" over the alternative name "Delta Rocks," due to the undisputed local usage of the name "Craft"

== See also ==
- List of islands of Washington
