= Tideland (film) =

2005 film by Terry Gilliam

- Theatrical release poster
- Directed by: Terry Gilliam
- Screenplay by: Tony Grisoni; Terry Gilliam
- Based on: Tideland by Mitch Cullin
- Produced by: Gabriella Martinelli; Jeremy Thomas
- Starring: Jodelle Ferland; Brendan Fletcher; Janet McTeer; Jennifer Tilly; Jeff Bridges
- Cinematography: Nicola Pecorini
- Edited by: Lesley Walker
- Music by: Jeff Danna; Mychael Danna
- Production companies: Recorded Picture Company; Telefilm Canada; The Movie Network; Astral Media; HanWay Films
- Distributed by: Revolver Entertainment (United Kingdom); Capri Films (Canada)
- Release dates: 9 September 2005 (Toronto); 11 August 2006 (UK); 27 October 2006 (US)
- Running time: 120 minutes
- Countries: United Kingdom; Canada
- Language: English
- Budget: CAD$19 million
- Box office: $566,611

Tideland is a 2005 fantasy film co-written and directed by Terry Gilliam, following the story of Jeliza-Rose (Jodelle Ferland), a young child who struggles to make sense of life in isolation as she lives with an eccentric adult brother and sister in rural Texas after the death of her drug-addicted, abusive parents. It is an adaptation of Mitch Cullin's novel of the same name. The film was shot in Regina, Saskatchewan, Canada, and the surrounding area in late 2004. The world premiere was at the 2005 Toronto International Film Festival where the film received a mixed response from both viewers and critics. After little interest from U.S. distributors, THINKFilm picked the film up for a U.S. release date in October 2006. Despite the film's eclectic and unconventional themes, which included child abuse, decomposition, incest, flatulence, mental illnesses and heroin usage, Tideland featured a number of notable actors, including Jennifer Tilly, Jeff Bridges, and Janet McTeer.

== Plot ==
Jeliza-Rose has solitary adventures during one summer in rural Texas while staying at a rundown farmhouse called What Rocks. The girl creates an increasingly dark, imaginative fantasy life with the aid of dismembered Barbie doll heads that she often wears on her fingertips. With names such as Mystique, Sateen Lips, Baby Blonde and Glitter Gal, the doll heads not only engage in long conversations with Jeliza-Rose, reflecting different aspects of the girl's psyche, but also act as her companions while she explores the barren Texas landscape.

After her mother overdoses on methadone, Jeliza-Rose and her father, Noah, flee to Noah's mother's home, a remote Texas farmhouse. Before they leave, however, Noah fears that with all the drugs in their house he will lose Jeliza-Rose and be sent to prison, so he attempts to set it alight, although Jeliza-Rose manages to stop him. They find the farmhouse abandoned, but they settle in anyway. Their first night there, Noah dies from a heroin overdose. For much of the rest of the film, Noah's corpse remains seated upright in a living room chair with sunglasses covering his eyes. As her father slowly begins to decompose, Jeliza-Rose doesn't readily acknowledge his death because she has grown accustomed to him being unconscious for long periods. Instead, she retreats deeper and deeper into her own mind, exploring the tall grass around the farmhouse, relying on her doll heads for friendship as an unconscious way of keeping herself from feeling too lonely and afraid.

During Jeliza-Rose's wanderings, she eventually encounters and befriends her neighbors, a mentally impaired young man called Dickens and his older sister Dell, who is blind in one eye from a bee sting, and who has a past connection to Jeliza-Rose's deceased father Noah. The eccentric neighbors take the girl under their wing, going so far as to preserve Noah's body via taxidermy. Amorous feelings, initiated mostly by the much younger Jeliza-Rose, begin to creep into the childlike relationship between her and Dickens, and it is revealed that the deeply troubled Dickens once drove a school bus in front of an oncoming train and keeps a stash of dynamite in his bedroom that he intends to use against the "monster shark" he believes is roaming the countryside (in reality, the nightly passenger train that travels past the farmhouse where Jeliza-Rose and her dead father reside). It is also revealed that Dell and Noah were once "kissers", as Jeliza-Rose finds pictures of the two in the room Dell shares with her own taxidermied mother.

Following a violent confrontation between Dell, Dickens and Jeliza-Rose, a train wreck is caused by Dickens' dynamite, creating a scene of chaos near the farmhouse. Wandering the wreckage among the confusion of injured travelers, Jeliza-Rose is discovered by a woman who survived, who assumes she is another victim of the wreck. The woman offers to adopt Jeliza-Rose, and they sit together by the burning train and watch as fireflies flit through the sky overhead.

== Cast ==
- Jodelle Ferland as Jeliza-Rose
- Brendan Fletcher as Dickens
- Janet McTeer as Dell
- Jennifer Tilly as Queen Gunhilda, Jeliza-Rose's mother
- Jeff Bridges as Noah, Jeliza-Rose's father
- Dylan Taylor as Patrick
- Wendy Anderson as Woman / Squirrel
- Sally Crooks as Dell's mother

== Production ==
Tideland, despite being set in rural Texas, was filmed in the prairies of western Canada, with interiors shot in Saskatchewan. Terry Gilliam was enamoured by the original novel by Mitch Cullin, having discovered the book in a stack of unread books on his desk in 2001. He described the novel as "funny, touching and disturbing all at the same time".

The film's crew had initial trouble financing the film, but they were eventually able to get things in order. Rather than Jeliza-Rose narrating the story in first-person as in the novel, the screenplay was written in third person.

Qu'Appelle Valley served as the location for the decrepit house of Dell and Dickens, and also for Noah's old family home where he takes Jeliza-Rose. The harsh Canadian weather meant that the crew had to rush to finish the film before conditions became too difficult. Casting Jeliza-Rose was also difficult; roughly 400 Canadian girls auditioned for the role, none of whom Gilliam felt had "a real soul" for the character. A VHS tape from Vancouver was submitted that featured Jodelle Ferland, whom Gilliam agreed was perfect for the role. While acting in the Stephen King miniseries Kingdom Hospital, Ferland prepared for her upcoming role as Jeliza-Rose. Jennifer Tilly, who played Jeliza-Rose's morbidly obese, abusive mother, wore excess padding to make herself appear overweight, but for the most part the chosen cast merely relied on makeup and behavioural mannerisms to accentuate their characters.

Production designer Jasna Stefanovic, who worked on most of the aesthetics and sets for Tideland, took heavy inspiration from Andrew Wyeth paintings and Lewis Carroll's Alice's Adventures in Wonderland. While the film portrayed disturbing and grotesque scenes of taxidermy and a trapped live squirrel, no animals were actually harmed during the production.

== Release ==
Tideland was released in theatres in 2006, but had first appeared in the autumn of 2005 at the Toronto International Film Festival and the Donostia-San Sebastian International Film Festival. The film was later released on DVD video in 2006–2007 in various countries, and a streaming version exists on Apple TV.

== Critical reception ==
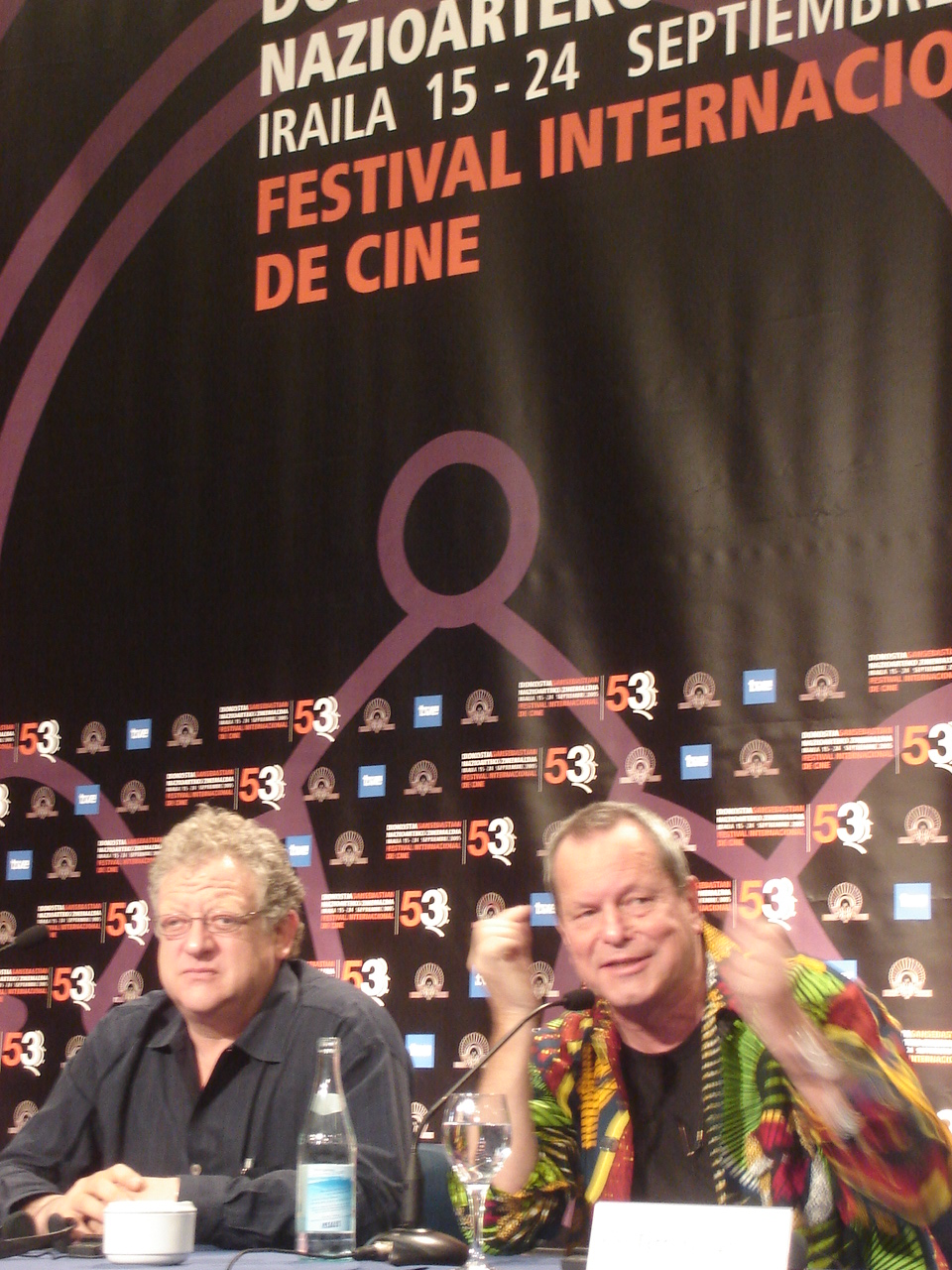
Jeremy Thomas (left) and Terry Gilliam at San Sebastián Film Festival 2005. Press conference on Tideland.

At Spain's 2005 San Sebastian Festival, Tideland was awarded the FIPRESCI Prize, selected by an international jury of critics who, in their award statement, said: "Our jury focused on the international competition and found Terry Gilliam's Tideland to be the best film of the selection—a decision which provoked controversial reactions." The jury consisted of Andrei Plakhov, Russia, President (Kommersant), Julio Feo Zarandieta, France (Radio France Internationale), Wolfgang Martin Hamdorf, Germany (Film-Dienst), Massimo Causo, Italy (Corriere Del Giorno), and Sergi Sanchez, Spain (La Razón).

In response to the controversy surrounding the film's FIPRESCI win at San Sebastian, jurist Sergi Sanchez wrote: "Gilliam's was the only one that dared to propose a risky and radical image, without any concessions, on a specific matter: madness as the only way of escaping in the face of a hostile environment. All this is endlessly coherent with the director's body of work, which has been frequently misunderstood by the critics, the industry, and audiences alike." Defending Gilliam's film while also placing it in the context of the director's previous works, as well as explaining the jury's decision, Sanchez concluded by stating, "Fighting against windmills is, after all, the same as fighting against the prejudices that trap creative freedom."

The subsequent mainstream reviews of Tideland were mixed, with Japan being the only country where it was both a critical and box office success. The film was first released in Russia (February 2006) followed by the Netherlands (March 2006) and Greece (May 2006). After almost a year without any US distribution, the film was picked up for American release by THINKFilm, and subsequently opened in the US, earning just $7,276 from one theater during its first week run. The film's release was then expanded, but to only nine theatres, for a total domestic gross of $66,453. Since then, several independent cinemas and art museums have presented the film as a special event, including IFC Center and the Modern Art Museum of Fort Worth.

Gilliam has openly criticized THINKFilm for the manner in which the company handled the American theatrical release of the film, and their unauthorized tampering with the aspect ratio of the film for its US DVD release. He has also gone on record as saying that nearly all his films have initially garnered mixed reactions from critics, and in at least one interview, as well as in the introduction to Tideland, he has stated that he believes many moviegoers will hate Tideland, others will love it, and some just would not know what to think about it. Gilliam has also said that Michael Palin, another former member of Monty Python, had told him that the film was either the best thing he had ever done, or the worst—although Palin himself could not quite decide either way.

Entertainment Weekly critic Owen Gleiberman gave Tideland an "F", calling it "gruesomely awful". In the subsequent review of the DVD release, Gleiberman's fellow Entertainment Weekly critic Clark Collis gave the film a "B" and stated: "Terry Gilliam's grim fairy tale is another fantastic(al) showcase for his visual talents."

The film received a "two thumbs way down" rating from Richard Roeper and guest critic A.O. Scott on the television show Ebert & Roeper. Scott said that toward the end, the film was "creepy, exploitive, and self-indulgent," a sentiment that was echoed in his review of the film for The New York Times. Like Scott, Roeper had a strong negative opinion, saying, "I hated this film," and "I came very close to walking out of the screening room. And I never do that." In the Chicago Reader, critic Jonathan Rosenbaum said the film was "hallucinatory and extremely unpleasant" and warned readers, "Enter this diseased Lewis Carroll universe at your own risk."

The Chicago Tribune critic Michael O'Sullivan, however, praised the film, further stating that "... it's crazy, dangerous and sometimes gorgeous ...", and Harry Knowles of Ain't It Cool News wrote, "Tideland, for me, is a masterpiece", a blurb featured on the DVD release.

Filmmaker David Cronenberg described the film as a "poetic horror film", a quote which was used in the advertising campaign for the theatrical release. Filmmaker Rian Johnson named Tideland and The Fountain as his favorite films of 2006.

In the 16 July 2007 online edition of Independent Film Channel News, Michael Atkinson published a comparative film review of Harry Kümel's rarely seen Malpertuis (1971) and Tideland. Atkinson posits that a historical perspective has made Kümel's previously scorned film a more viable creation when far removed from the cultural context in which it was first released. He goes on to argue that Tideland could be the 21st century counterpart to Malpertuis, suggesting that Gilliam's film "is a snark-hunted freak just waiting for its historical moment, decades from now, when someone makes a case for it as a neglected masterpiece."

On the review aggregator website Rotten Tomatoes, the film holds an approval rating of 31% based on 77 reviews, with an average rating of 4.7/10. The website's critics consensus reads, "Tideland is a disturbing, and mostly unwatchable effort from Terry Gilliam."

On Metacritic, the film has a score of 26 out of 100 based on reviews from 23 critics, indicating "generally unfavorable" reviews.

== Home media ==
The DVD of Tideland was released on 27 February 2007 in a 2-disc "Collector's Edition", with a commentary track, many interviews, deleted scenes (with a forced commentary over the original audio), and a making-of documentary entitled Getting Gilliam, made by Cube director Vincenzo Natali.

There has been some controversy among fans over the aspect ratio presented on the Region 1 DVD released by THINKFilm for the United States, which is 1.78:1, instead of the aspect ratio prepared and approved by Gilliam and the director of photography (in theaters, it was shown in 2.35:1, but Gilliam wanted to open up the image slightly for home video, somewhere between 2.10:1 and 2.25:1).

There were early reports that DVD releases in Canada (Region 1) and other regions used the theatrical aspect ratio, but these have proven to be entirely false. The Region 3 DVD was rumored to feature the fully corrected transfer, but this was later debunked on the same website where the claim was made; as shown in a purported screen capture of the Hong Kong release, the Region 3 DVD uses the incorrect aspect ratio.

The UK (Region 2) release, does have a 2.10:1 aspect ratio. The German EuroVideo–Concorde Home Entertainment release has been independently verified to use the theatrical 2.35:1 ratio, as is seen in screen captures from it. OFDb.de also gives this ratio for the German release.

Both THINKFilm and Gilliam have publicly stated that they are working on a solution to the ratio problem and will release a corrected version for sale as soon as possible. That did not happen until the Blu-ray editions were released a decade later, long after THINKFilm had gone out of business.

== Accolades ==
Won

- San Sebastian Festival (2005)
  - FIPRESCI Prize

Nominated

- Golden Trailer Awards (2006)
  - "Most Original Foreign Trailer".
- Saturn Award (2007)
  - Best Performance by a Young Actor (Jodelle Ferland).
- 27th Genie Awards (2007)
  - Best Actress (Jodelle Ferland)
  - Art Direction/Production Design (Jasna Stefanovic)
  - Cinematography (Nicola Pecorini)
  - Costume design (Mario Davignon)
  - Editing (Lesley Walker)
  - Overall Sound.

== See also ==
- Works influenced by Alice in Wonderland
- The Reflecting Skin
