= The Post-War Dream (novel) =

Book by Mitch Cullin

- Author: Mitch Cullin
- Language: English
- Genre: Novel
- Publisher: Nan A. Talese/Doubleday
- Publication date: March 2008
- Publication place: United States
- Media type: Print (hardback)
- ISBN: 978-0-385-51329-6
- OCLC: 85444320
- Dewey Decimal: 813/.54 22
- LC Class: PS3553.U319 P67 2008
- Preceded by: A Slight Trick of the Mind 2005

The Post-War Dream is the eighth book by American author Mitch Cullin and was published by Random House in March 2008.

Initial reviews of the novel were mixed, with Kirkus Reviews calling it "a misstep in Cullin's unpredictable, adventurous and, alas, frustratingly uneven oeuvre," and Publishers Weekly dismissing the work as "sterile." But subsequent pre-publication reviews from Booklist, Library Journal, and The Denver Post were positive.

In the March 16 edition of the Los Angeles Times Book Review and, simultaneously published, the Chicago Tribune, critic Donna Seaman praised the book, stating: "In this exacting, suspenseful, elegiac yet life-embracing novel, Cullin reminds us that no boundaries separate the personal and communal, the past and present, the false and true."
