= Whompyjawed =

Book by Mitch Cullin

- First edition
- Author: Mitch Cullin
- Language: English
- Publication date: 1999

Whompyjawed is the debut novel by American author Mitch Cullin. It is the first installment of the writer's Texas Trilogy that also includes the dark novel-in-verse Branches and the surrealistic novel Tideland.

Whompyjawed was first published in September 1999 as a hardcover edition from The Permanent Press. A trade paperback edition was published by Simon & Schuster in April 2001, but as of 2007, it is no longer in print.
