= Permanent Press (publisher) =

American independent book publisher

- Founded: 1978
- Country of origin: United States
- Headquarters location: Sag Harbor, New York
- Fiction genres: Fiction, non-fiction
- Official website: thepermanentpress.com

Permanent Press is an American independent book publisher. The press was founded by Judith and Martin Shepard in 1978 and is based in Sag Harbor, New York. It also published through the Second Chance imprint, which releases books previously out of print.

The press first brought the work of Nobel laureate Halldor Laxness to the United States. Its books and authors have won the American Book Award, Hammett Prize and Small Press Book Award, and have been finalists for the National Book Award, Edgar Award and Chautauqua Prize.

Among the publisher's best known books is The Hoax, Clifford Irving's account of his fraudulent interviews with Howard Hughes.

Published authors include Mitch Cullin, Sandra Scofield, Chris Knopf, Jess Gregg, Marian Thurm, Berry Fleming, Richard Lortz Richard Lortz, William Herrick, and Joseph Stanley Pennell.
