= Guthrie Common School District =

School district in Texas

Guthrie School

Location
- 301 Jaguar Lane; Guthrie, Texas 79236-0070; United States; 33.6235°N 100.3243°W

Information
- School type: Public K-12
- School district: Guthrie Common School District
- Grades: PK-12
- Enrollment: 98 (2023-2024)
- Colors: Green & gold
- Athletics conference: UIL Class A
- Mascot: Jaguar
- Yearbook: Jaguar
- Website: www.guthriejags.com

Guthrie Common School District is a public school district based in the community of Guthrie, Texas (USA), in central King County.

The school district covers the majority of King County, excepting a portion in the northeast (which instead is in the Crowell Independent School District).

The district operates one building that houses Guthrie School (which serves students in grades kindergarten through twelve), as well as the GCSD administration offices and the King County Library. Guthrie School is a public K-12 school, located in Guthrie, that is classified as a 1A school by the UIL. In 2015, the school was rated "Met Standard" by the Texas Education Agency.

== Academic achievement ==
In 2011, the school district was rated "Recognized" by the Texas Education Agency.

== Athletics ==
The Guthrie Jaguars compete in cross country, six-man football, basketball, golf, and track.

The school district built a new gymnasium, completed for the 2010–2011 season.

== See also ==
- List of school districts in Texas
- List of high schools in Texas
