= HanWay Films =

British film and distribution company

HanWay Films Limited
- Logo used since 2006
- Type: Subsidiary
- Industry: Feature films
- Founded: 30 November 1998; 27 years ago
- Founder: Jeremy Thomas; Peter Watson; Stephan Mallmann
- Headquarters: London, England, United Kingdom
- Key people: See § Team
- Products: An Education; A Dangerous Method; Made in Dagenham; Carol; Brooklyn; The Killing of a Sacred Deer; See § Films
- Services: Film production; Film distribution; International sales; Licensing
- Revenue: ▲£8 million (2024)
- Operating income: ▲£6.2 million (2022)
- Parent: Cohen Media Group (2022-present)
- Website: https://www.hanwayfilms.com/

HanWay Films is a British independent film production and distribution company specializing in theatrical feature films as well as distributing them on home entertainment systems.

HanWay is an international sales, distribution and marketing company specialising in films from worldwide talent. HanWay arranges financing, sales and distribution for all films from Recorded Picture Company, along with projects from third party producers.

== History ==
On 30 November 1998, Jeremy Thomas founded production and foreign sales company HanWay Films with his colleagues Peter Watson (deputy chairman) and Stephan Mallmann, and continues to chair the board. Two new members joined the board in 2011, Thorsten Schumacher, previously head of sales, was appointed managing director, and former head of business affairs Jan Spielhoff took up the reins as chief operating officer.

HanWay also represents an extensive film catalogue of over 500 features including films from Thomas's Recorded Picture Company, and the British Film Institute. These include productions by Woody Allen, Takeshi Kitano, Bernardo Bertolucci, Wim Wenders, Terry Gilliam, David Cronenberg, Peter Greenaway, Jean-Luc Godard, David Mamet, Miloš Forman, Stephen Frears, Phillip Noyce and Nagisa Ōshima.

In August 2022, it was announced that American film production company Cohen Media Group had acquired HanWay Films from its founder Jeremy Thomas with HanWay Films continued to be branded as an independent label within Cohen Media Group. In January 2025, HanWay became the main representative of the Cohen Film Collection.

== Productions ==
HanWay's productions include Thomas' production of David Cronenberg's A Dangerous Method starring Keira Knightley, Viggo Mortensen, Michael Fassbender and Vincent Cassel, in the true-life story of the young Dr. Jung, his mentor Freud and the beautiful patient that came between them; Lone Scherfig's coming-of-age drama An Education, which won Carey Mulligan a BAFTA award for Best Actress; James Gunn's pop-culture actioner Super starring Rainn Wilson, Elliot Page and Liv Tyler, from producer Ted Hope; Nigel Cole's Made in Dagenham starring Golden Globe nominee Sally Hawkins from producer Stephen Woolley, and Andrea Arnold's adaptation of the romantic classic Wuthering Heights.

Other films handled include Nowhere Boy, a film by artist Sam Taylor-Wood based on John Lennon's teenage years starring Aaron Johnson; Gurinder Chadha's culinary black comedy It's a Wonderful Afterlife which premiered at the 2010 Sundance Film Festival, Harry Brown starring Academy Award winner Michael Caine; Scott Hicks’ Australian-set drama The Boys Are Back starring Clive Owen; Irish comedy Perrier's Bounty, starring Cillian Murphy and Academy Award winner Jim Broadbent; and Danis Tanović's Triage, with Colin Farrell in the lead. Theatrical documentary releases include Julien Temple's Oil City Confidential, and Mugabe and the White African.

Other releases include Jon Amiel's Creation starring Paul Bettany and Jennifer Connelly (produced by Thomas), which opened the 2009 Toronto International Film Festival, Sunshine Cleaning starring Amy Adams and Emily Blunt; Gerald McMorrow's Franklyn starring Eva Green, Ryan Phillippe and Sam Riley (produced by Thomas), Christopher Smith's period thriller Black Death starring Sean Bean, and Michael Winterbottom's Genova starring Colin Firth.

The company also handled Takashi Miike's samurai epic Thirteen Assassins, and Jerzy Skolimowski's political thriller Essential Killing, both executive-produced by Thomas. Both films premiered at the 67th Venice International Film Festival, and Essential Killing went on to win the Special Jury Prize, Best Actor for Vincent Gallo (the Volpi Cup), and the Cinemavenniere Award for Best Film in Competition (voted by a youth jury). Upcoming productions include films by David Cronenberg, Terry Gilliam and Phillip Noyce.

The company has previously handled such titles as Woody Allen's Match Point, starring Scarlett Johansson, Julian Jarrold's Becoming Jane starring Anne Hathaway and James McAvoy, and Sarah Polley's multi-Academy Award nominated Away from Her starring Julie Christie.

In its capacity as international sales agent, HanWay works closely with Ecosse Films.

HanWay Films represents collections from the British Film Institute, Merchant Ivory, Peter Weir, Wim Wenders, Phillip Noyce, Jean Doumanian, Alex Cox, Paul Cox, New Zealand Film Commission, Manoel de Oliveira and Recorded Picture Company, comprising some 500 feature films, documentaries and animations. This collection includes films from noted world cinema figures, including Woody Allen, Bernardo Bertolucci, David Cronenberg, Clint Eastwood, Miloš Forman, Stephen Frears, Terry Gilliam, Alfred Hitchcock, James Ivory, Takeshi Kitano, Bob Rafelson, Terence Davies, David Mamet, Martin Scorsese, and Ridley Scott.

With Carol, Brooklyn and Anomalisa, managing director Thorsten Schumacher announced 2015 as "the most successful year for [HanWay Films] to date."

== Team ==
=== Executive Board ===
- Jeremy Thomas - Chairman
- Peter Watson - Vice Chairman
- Marie-Gabrielle Stewart - Managing Director

=== Marketing and Publicity ===
- Tom Grievson - Head of Marketing and Distribution
- Tejinder Jouhal - Director of Marketing and Distribution
- Joseph Hewitt - Marketing Manager

=== Sales ===
- Nicole Mackey - Head of Sales
- Mark Lane - Director of Sales
- Marta Ravani - Director of Sales, HanWay The Collections

=== Acquisitions ===
- Matthew Baker - Director of Acquisitions

=== Business Affairs & Finance ===
- Justin Kelly - Head of Business & Legal Affairs
- Beverley Cullen - Contracts Manager
- Elizabeth Kormanova - Director of Business Affairs
- Ivan Kelava - Senior Business Affairs Manager
- Rachel Barbut - Financial Controller
- Siu Lee - Assistant Accountant
- Gareth Melia - Assistant Accountant

== Films ==
=== 1999 ===
- Just Looking
- Story of a Bad Boy
- Women Talking Dirty
- Sunburn
- The Cup
- Buena Vista Social Club

=== 2000 ===
- Help! I'm a Fish
- Brother
- Innocence

=== 2001 ===
- Lotte Reiniger
- The Mystic Masseur
- The Diaries of Vaslav Nijinsky
- Triumph of Love
- Love the Hard Way
- The Last Minute

=== 2002 ===
- Junimond
- Half the Rent
- Serving Sara
- Revengers Tragedy
- Lost in La Mancha
- Rabbit-Proof Fence

=== 2003 ===
- House of Sand and Fog
- The Boys from County Clare
- Festival Express
- Travellers and Magicians
- The Dreamers
- Danny Deckchair
- The Soul of a Man
- Young Adam
- To Kill a King
- Fools
- All the Real Girls

=== 2004 ===
- Night of Truth
- It's All Gone Pete Tong
- Human Touch
- Land of Plenty
- Promised Land
- Egoshooter
- Creep
- The Football Factory
- Derek Jarman: Life as Art
- Boo, Zino & the Snurks

=== 2005 ===
- Dreaming Lhasa
- Brothers of the Head
- Tideland
- Magic Mirror
- Don't Come Knocking
- Match Point
- The Devil and Daniel Johnston

=== 2006 ===
- Goya's Ghosts
- Anger Me
- Away from Her
- Belle Toujours
- Impy's Island
- Scoop
- Severance
- Fast Food Nation
- Samoan Wedding
- A Woman in Winter
- Kidulthood
- Glastonbury

=== 2007 ===
- Battle for Haditha
- Never Apologize
- Mister Lonely
- Control
- Moving Midway
- Becoming Jane
- Kaluapapa Heavan
- Joe Strummer: The Future Is Unwritten

=== 2008 ===
- A Bunch of Amateurs
- Franklyn
- Salvation
- Genova
- Is Anybody There?
- Brideshead Revisited
- Palermo Shooting
- Of Time and the City
- Impy's Island
- Sunshine Cleaning
- Two Fists, One Heart

=== 2009 ===
- Nowhere Boy
- Oil City Confidential
- Beyond the Pole
- The Boys Are Back
- Harry Brown
- Triage
- Perrier's Bounty
- Creation
- Mugabe and the White African
- Empire of Silver
- An Education

=== 2010 ===
- Robinson in Ruins
- Made in Dagenham
- Super
- 13 Assassins
- Essential Killing
- Chico and Rita
- Black Death
- Thunder Soul
- It's a Wonderful Afterlife

=== 2011 ===
- Diana Vreeland: The Eye Has to Travel
- Roman Polanski: A Film Memoir
- You're Next
- Wuthering Heights
- Shame
- A Dangerous Method
- Hara-Kiri: Death of a Samurai
- The Decoy Bride
- TT3D: Closer to the Edge
- Pina
- Life in a Day
- Being Elmo: A Puppeteer's Journey

=== 2012 ===
- Great Expectations
- Quartet
- Seven Psychopaths
- Kon-Tiki
- Woody Allen: A Documentary
- Me and You
- Anton Corbijn

=== 2013 ===
- Vara: A Blessing
- Finding Vivian Maier
- Dom Hemingway
- The Unknown Known
- Tracks
- Only Lovers Left Alive
- Seduced and Abandoned
- All Is Bright
- Houston
- Dirty Wars

=== 2014 ===
- 20,000 Days on Earth
- God Help the Girl
- The Guest
- The Riot Club

=== 2015 ===
- Anomalisa
- Brooklyn
- Carol
- Every Thing Will Be Fine
- High-Rise
- Tale of Tales

=== 2016 ===
- The Limehouse Golem
- Their Finest

=== 2017 ===
- How to Talk to Girls at Parties
- Mary Shelley
- A Prayer Before Dawn

=== 2018 ===
- Colette
- The Hummingbird Project
- Monsters and Men

=== 2019 ===
- The Burnt Orange Heresy
- Impy's Island
- The Kindness of Strangers
- Pavarotti
- Roads
- The Song of Names
- The Wolf Hour

=== 2020 ===
- Crock of Gold: A Few Rounds with Shane MacGowen
- The Dissident
- Laila in Haifa
- Made in Italy
- Wild Mountain Thyme
- The Roads Not Taken

=== 2021 ===
- The Card Counter
- Falling
- Land
- Minamata
- Music
- Seance
- Ted K

=== 2022 ===
- Blueback
- EO
- Master Gardener

=== 2023 ===
- Anselm
- The Royal Hotel
- Shayda
- Sweet Sue
- What Happens Later

=== 2024 ===
- La cocina
- The Dead Don't Hurt
- Race for Glory: Audi vs. Lancia
- The Return
- Timestalker

=== 2025 ===
- Tornado
- Hot Milk

=== 2026 ===
- DreamQuil
- Extra Geography

=== Upcoming ===
- Alone Together
- Billion Dollar Spy
- The Creep
- McCarthy
- The One
- The Species
- You Really Got Me
