= Recorded Picture Company =

British film-production company

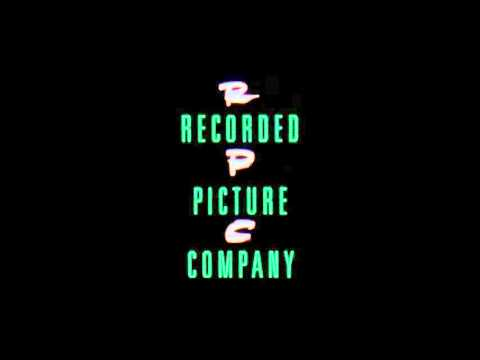
- Type: Private
- Industry: Films
- Founded: 1974; 52 years ago
- Founder: Jeremy Thomas
- Headquarters: London, England, United Kingdom
- Key people: Jeremy Thomas (founder and chairman), Peter Watson (CEO)
- Products: Stealing Beauty; Little Buddha; Crash; Sexy Beast; The Dreamers; Creation
- Owner: Jeremy Thomas
- Parent: Thomas and the Recorded Picture Company Limited
- Website: https://www.recordedpicture.com/

Recorded Picture Company is a British film production company founded in 1974 by producer Jeremy Thomas, who later also founded HanWay Films.

== History ==
Recorded Picture Company (RPC) is an independent production company that makes feature films for worldwide theatrical release. Jeremy Thomas founded the London-based company in 1974, and remains chairman. Its first production, The Shout directed by Jerzy Skolimowski, went on to win the Grand Prix de Jury at the Cannes Film Festival in 1978. Thomas has since produced or executive-produced over 60 films through RPC, of which all but one have obtained North American theatrical release.

RPC is a director-driven company, and has close relationships with a number of leading directors including Bernardo Bertolucci, Phillip Noyce, Terry Gilliam, Stephen Frears, David Cronenberg and Takeshi Kitano. Its films have achieved commercial success and critical acclaim, with the best-known being Bertolucci's The Last Emperor, winner of nine Academy Awards including 'Best Picture'. Other notable productions include Bertolucci's Stealing Beauty and Little Buddha, Cronenberg's Naked Lunch and Crash, Sexy Beast by Jonathan Glazer, Brother by Kitano, and Merry Christmas, Mr. Lawrence by Nagisa Oshima. RPC's films have garnered numerous prizes at Cannes and other major festivals and awards ceremonies.

Jeremy Thomas later remembered forging the reputation of the company in the 1970s:

At the beginning I didn't really understand what I was doing. I didn't understand business terms and I probably didn't understand taste or cultural terms, but it was about now I was beginning to refine what I was trying to do. I was trying to think what sort of films that I wanted to make, what sort of audiences I was trying to find. And I am the type of independent producer, I am looking for a film to make my next film and to make profits and successful films, but I am not working in the arena of super profits. I am not working in an industrialised process. I am making global films but not films for a globalised market.

== Productions ==
RPC's releases include Bertolucci's The Dreamers, Terry Gilliam's Tideland, Wim Wenders' Don't Come Knocking, Richard Linklater's Fast Food Nation, and Jon Amiel's Creation, about the life of Charles Darwin starring Paul Bettany and Jennifer Connelly, which was the Opening Gala of the 2009 Toronto International Film Festival. 2010 saw Takashi Miike's samurai epic 13 Assassins and Jerzy Skolimowski's Essential Killing had their world premieres in Competition at the Venice International Film Festival, with both films going on to feature in Official Selection at Toronto. In 2012, Miike's Hara-Kiri: Death of a Samurai premiered in Competition at the Cannes International Film Festival, the first 3D film ever to do so.

Recent releases include David Cronenberg's A Dangerous Method, which premiered at Venice and Toronto Film Festivals in 2012, and the epic adventure Kon-Tiki, based on Thor Heyerdahl's best-selling book, which was nominated for an Academy Award for Best Foreign Film in 2012. The company premiered Jim Jarmusch's vampire opus Only Lovers Left Alive In Competition at the 2013 Cannes Film Festival, the black comedy Dom Hemingway written and directed by Richard Shepard at the 2013 Toronto International Film Festival, the dark fantasy Tale of Tales by Matteo Garrone In Competition at the 2015 Cannes Film festival, the sci-fi period thriller High-Rise by Ben Wheatley at the 2015 Toronto Film Festival, and Blade of the Immortal by Takashi Miike which had its world premiere In Selection at Cannes 2017. Upcoming projects include titles from Matteo Garrone and Julien Temple. RPC's head of development Alainée Kent works closely on the slate with Thomas.

== Films ==
- The Shout (1978, directed by Jerzy Skolimowski)
- Bad Timing (1980, directed by Nicolas Roeg)
- Eureka (1982, directed by Nicolas Roeg)
- Merry Christmas, Mr. Lawrence (1982, directed by Nagisa Oshima)
- The Hit (1984, directed by Stephen Frears)
- Insignificance (1985, directed by Nicolas Roeg)
- The Last Emperor (1987, directed by Bernardo Bertolucci)
- Everybody Wins (1990, directed by Karel Reisz)
- The Sheltering Sky (1990, directed by Bernardo Bertolucci)
- Let Him Have It (1991, directed by Peter Medak)
- Naked Lunch (1991, directed by David Cronenberg)
- Little Buddha (1993, directed by Bernardo Bertolucci)
- Stealing Beauty (1995, directed by Bernardo Bertolucci)
- Victory (1995, directed by Mark Peploe)
- Rough Magic (1995, directed by Clare Peploe)
- The Ogre (1995, directed by Volker Schlöndorff)
- Crash (1996, directed by David Cronenberg)
- Blood and Wine (1996, directed by Bob Rafelson)
- The Brave (1997, directed by Johnny Depp)
- All the Little Animals (1998, directed by Jeremy Thomas)
- Sexy Beast (2000, directed by Jonathan Glazer)
- Brother (2000, directed by Takeshi Kitano)
- Gohatto (2000, directed by Nagisa Oshima)
- Rabbit-Proof Fence (2002, directed by Phillip Noyce)
- Triumph of Love (2002, directed by Clare Peploe)
- Young Adam (2003, directed by David Mackenzie)
- Travellers and Magicians (2003, directed by Khyentse Norbu)
- The Dreamers (2003, directed by Bernardo Bertolucci)
- Dreaming Lhasa (2004, directed by Tenzing Sonam & Ritu Sarin)
- Back to Gaya (2004, directed by Lenard Fritz Krawinkel and Holger Tappe)
- Don't Come Knocking (2004, directed by Wim Wenders)
- Tideland (2005, directed by Terry Gilliam)
- Glastonbury (2005, directed by Julien Temple)
- Fast Food Nation (2006, directed by Richard Linklater)
- Mister Lonely (2006, directed by Harmony Korine)
- Franklyn (2008, directed by Gerald McMorrow)
- Creation (2009, directed by Jon Amiel)
- 13 Assassins (2010, directed by Takashi Miike)
- Essential Killing (2010, directed by Jerzy Skolimowski)
- Pina (2010, directed by Wim Wenders)
- A Dangerous Method (2011, directed by David Cronenberg)
- Hara-Kiri: Death of a Samurai (2011, directed by Takashi Miike)
- Kon-Tiki (2012, directed by Joachim Rønning & Espen Sandberg)
- Dom Hemingway (2013, directed by Richard Shepard)
- Only Lovers Left Alive (2013, directed by Jim Jarmusch)
- High-Rise (2015, directed by Ben Wheatley)
- Tale of Tales (2015, directed by Matteo Garrone)
- Blade of the Immortal (2017, directed by Takashi Miike)
- The Man Who Killed Don Quixote (2018, directed by Terry Gilliam)
- Samurai Marathon (2019, directed by Bernard Rose)
- First Love (2019, directed by Takashi Miike)
- Pinocchio (2019, directed by Matteo Garrone)
- Traveling Light (2022, directed by Bernard Rose)
- EO (2022, directed by Jerzy Skolimowski)
- Good Boy (2025, directed by Jan Komasa)
