= White Crane Films =

Film production company

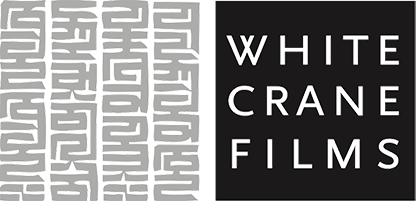
- Industry: Film production
- Founded: 1990
- Founder: Ritu Sarin and Tenzing Sonam
- Headquarters: London, England
- Website: White Crane Films

White Crane Films is an independent film production company founded in 1990 in London by filmmakers, Ritu Sarin and Tenzing Sonam. The company produced feature films, documentaries and art installations under its aegis.

Focusing primarily on Tibet-related subjects, productions include, The Reincarnation of Khensur Rinpoche (1991) which inspired Little Buddha to Bernardo Bertolucci. The film followed a Drepung monk, who traveled from Karnataka to Tibet passing through Nepal and found the tulku of Khensur Rinpoche (Pema Gyaltsen Rinpoché), the reincarnation of his master. The film was shot on 4:3.. Productions also include The Trials of Telo Rinpoche (1993), A Stranger in My Native Land (1998), The Shadow Circus: The CIA in Tibet (1998), the Tibetan feature film, Dreaming Lhasa (2005), and The Thread of Karma (2007).

In 2007, Ritu Sarin and Tenzing Sonam were commissioned by Thyssen-Bornemisza Art Contemporary in Vienna to make the single-channel video installation, Some Questions on the Nature of Your Existence. The video was shown at the Mori Art Museum in Tokyo as part of the exhibition, "The Kaleidoscopic Eye: Thyssen-Bornemisza Art Contemporary Collection," held from April 5 to July 5, 2009. It was a part of the 2010 Busan Biennale, "Living in Evolution", from 12 September to 20 November 2010

In March 2009, their feature documentary, The Dalai Lama: 50 Years After the Fall, was broadcast on France 5 and Nederland 2 (BOS). A personal version of the film was completed in October 2009. That film, The Sun Behind the Clouds: Tibet's Struggle for Freedom, premiered on 24 October 2009 at the South Korean DMZ International Documentary Film Festival. The music was composed by twice Oscar-winning composer, Gustavo Santaolalla. The film was executive produced by Francesca von Habsburg and Lavinia Currier. The film showed at numerous international film festivals, winning several awards, including the Václav Havel Award at the One World Film Festival in Prague.

White Crane Films forms the backbone of the Dharamsala International Film Festival (DIFF).
