= Ralang Road =

- Poster
- Directed by: Karma Takapa
- Written by: Karma Takapa
- Starring: Shubham; Sonam Wangyal Ladimpa; Domber Mani Pradhan; Sudan Gurung
- Cinematography: Sonu
- Release date: 6 July 2017 (Karlovy Vary International Film Festival)
- Country: India
- Languages: Nepali; Hindi

Ralang Road is a 2017 Indian Nepali-language film directed by Karma Takapa.

The film was screened at the Karlovy Vary International Film Festival and was notably the first Indian film to be screened in the competition section for thirteen years. Apart from two actors, the cast features locals from Sikkim. The film was shown at the Mumbai Film Festival on 12 October 2017 and various other festivals including the Fajr International Film Festival, the Chicago South Asian Film Festival and the Dharamshala International Film Festival.

== Plot ==
Four people come together after a mysterious robbery occurs in Rabong, Sikkim.

== Reception ==
Udita Jhujhunwala of Firstpost opined that "It manages to capture the reality of Sikkim realistically, but the director is not able to convincingly weave together all parts of the story". Suparna Thombare of Cinestaan said that "The eerie winter gloom, used predominantly in place of the well-known gorgeous beauty of the Himalayas, assumes the role of central character and sets up the story brilliantly".
