= Jeremy Thomas =

British film producer (1949–2026)

Jeremy Thomas CBE
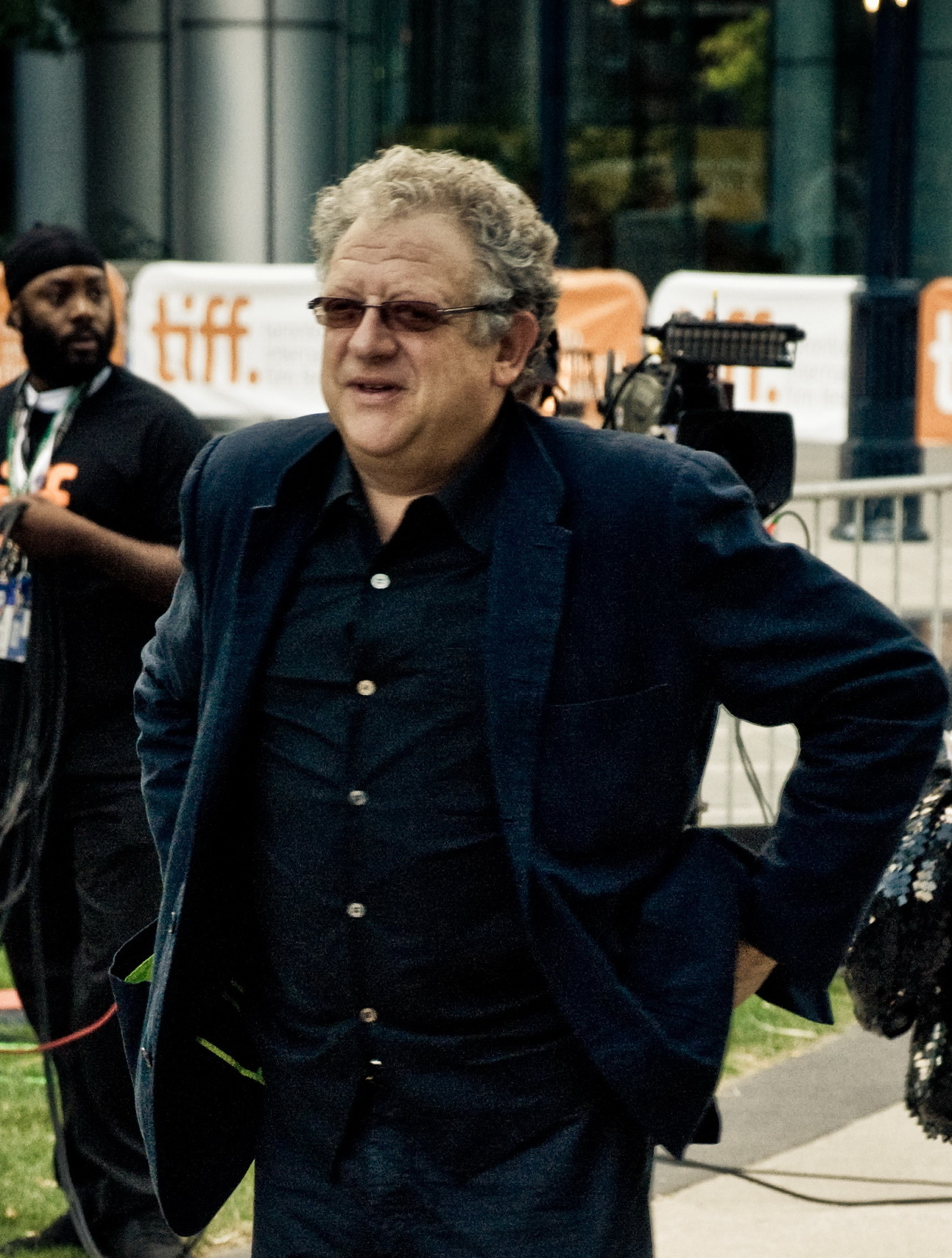
- Thomas in 2009
- Born: Jeremy Jack Thomas; 26 July 1949; London, England
- Died: 11 September 2026 (aged 77); Oxfordshire, England
- Education: Millfield
- Occupation: Film producer
- Years active: 1974–2026
- Spouses: Claudia Frohlich (m. 1977; div. 1981) Eski Thomas (née Vivien Coughman) (m. 1982; died 2023)
- Father: Ralph Thomas
- Relatives: Gerald Thomas (uncle)
- Awards: European Film Academy Achievement in World Cinema Award

Jeremy Jack Thomas (26 July 1949 – 11 September 2026) was a British film producer. He was the founder and chairman of Recorded Picture Company. Thomas produced Bernardo Bertolucci's The Last Emperor, which won him the 1988 Academy Award for Best Picture. In 2006, he received a European Film Award for Outstanding European Achievement in World Cinema. His father was director Ralph Thomas (director of many of the Doctor films), while his uncle Gerald Thomas directed all of the films in the Carry On franchise.

== Early life ==
Thomas was born in London, England on 26 July 1949, into a filmmaking family, with his father, Ralph Thomas, and uncle, Gerald Thomas, both directors. His childhood ambition was to work in cinema. As he said in a 2016 interview, "I was born in Ealing near the studios, moved to a country house near Pinewood, where I grew up around people who I didn't realise were Katharine Hepburn, Brigitte Bardot and Dirk Bogarde." Thomas attended boarding-school at Millfield in Somerset.

== Career ==
As soon as he left school, Thomas went to work in various positions, ending up in the cutting rooms working on films such as The Harder They Come (1972), Family Life (1971) and The Golden Voyage of Sinbad (1973), and worked through the ranks to become a film editor for Ken Loach on A Misfortune.

After editing Philippe Mora's Brother, Can You Spare a Dime?, he produced his first film Mad Dog Morgan in 1974 in Australia. He then returned to England to produce Jerzy Skolimowski's The Shout, which won the Grand Prix de Jury at the Cannes Film Festival. It was partly financed by the Rank Organisation, for whom his father had worked for many years.

Thomas's films were all highly individual and his independence of spirit has paid off both artistically and commercially. His output of more than forty films includes three films directed by Nicolas Roeg: Bad Timing, Eureka and Insignificance, Julien Temple's The Great Rock 'n' Roll Swindle, Nagisa Oshima's Merry Christmas, Mr. Lawrence, and The Hit directed by Stephen Frears.

In 1986, Thomas produced Bernardo Bertolucci's epic The Last Emperor, an independently financed project that was three years in the making. A commercial and critical triumph, the film swept the board at the 1987 Academy Awards, garnering nine Oscars, including Best Picture.

Thomas completed many films, including Karel Reisz's film of Arthur Miller's screenplay Everybody Wins, Bertolucci's film of Paul Bowles's The Sheltering Sky, Little Buddha and Stealing Beauty, David Cronenberg's films of William S. Burroughs's Naked Lunch, J. G. Ballard's Crash and Christopher Hampton's A Dangerous Method (based on Hampton's The Talking Cure). In 1997, Thomas directed All the Little Animals, starring John Hurt and Christian Bale, which was in Official Selection at Cannes. Notable recent credits include Jonathan Glazer's debut film Sexy Beast, Takeshi Kitano's Brother, Khyentse Norbu's The Cup, Phillip Noyce's Rabbit-Proof Fence, David Mackenzie's film of Alexander Trocchi's Young Adam, Bernardo Bertolucci's The Dreamers, Terry Gilliam's Tideland, Wim Wenders's Don't Come Knocking, Richard Linklater's Fast Food Nation and Gerald McMorrow's Franklyn, starring Eva Green, Sam Riley and Ryan Phillippe. His film, Jon Amiel's Creation, about the life of Charles Darwin, with Paul Bettany and Jennifer Connelly in the leads, was the Opening Gala of the 2009 Toronto International Film Festival.

In 2010, Thomas premiered Jerzy Skolimowski's Essential Killing and Takashi Miike's 13 Assassins at the Venice Film Festival, both of which he executive-produced. Essential Killing went on to win the Jury Prize and two others, a triple win unprecedented in the Festival's history. Thomas also executive-produced Wim Wenders's 3D dance film Pina, which premiered at the 2011 Berlinale. At Cannes 2011, Thomas premiered Takashi Miike's new film, Hara-Kiri: Death of a Samurai, the first 3D film to show in Competition.

His other releases include David Cronenberg's A Dangerous Method (2011), written by Christopher Hampton and starring Keira Knightley, Viggo Mortensen, Michael Fassbender and Vincent Cassel, which premiered at Venice and Toronto Film Festivals 2011. In 2012, Thomas launched the epic Kon-Tiki, the true story of Thor Heyerdahl's legendary raft adventure directed by Joachim Roenning and Espen Sandberg, which was nominated for a Golden Globe and Academy Award for Best Foreign Film. In 2014, Thomas released Jim Jarmusch's vampire opus Only Lovers Left Alive starring Tilda Swinton, Tom Hiddleston, Mia Wasikowska and John Hurt, and Richard Shepard's black comedy Dom Hemingway starring Jude Law, Richard E. Grant, Demián Bichir and Emilia Clarke.

In 2015, Thomas produced an adaptation of J. G. Ballard's 1970s dystopian novel High-Rise, written by Amy Jump and directed by Ben Wheatley, starring Tom Hiddleston, Jeremy Irons, Sienna Miller, Luke Evans and Elisabeth Moss, and Tale of Tales directed by Matteo Garrone starring Salma Hayek, Vincent Cassel, John C. Reilly and Toby Jones.

Thomas said of his ethos:

An entrepreneurial spirit is an important element of being a producer, some sort of inner workings that is pushing you forward. Because there are a lot of knockbacks and you have to wear a sort of armour so you can continue believing in your films when everybody around you is telling you: "Don't do that."

In 1998, Thomas founded his international sales arm, HanWay Films, to service his own productions. HanWay has since expanded to sell third-party projects, as well as handling the libraries of many of the world's best-known filmmakers.

He was Chairman of the British Film Institute (BFI) from August 1992 until December 1997, and has been the recipient of many awards throughout the world, including the Michael Balcon Award for Outstanding British Contribution to Cinema from BAFTA, and the European Film Award for Outstanding European Achievement in World Cinema. He has been president of the jury at Tokyo Film Festival, San Sebastian Film Festival, Berlin Film Festival and Cannes Film Festival (Un Certain Regard) and has also served on the main jury at Cannes. He was made a Life Fellow of the British Film Institute in 2000.

== Death ==
Thomas died at his country home in Oxfordshire, on 11 September 2026, aged 77.

== Awards and honours ==
In 2006, Thomas received the European Film Academy Achievement in World Cinema Award.

Thomas was appointed Commander of the Order of the British Empire (CBE) in the 2009 New Year Honours. He was also made Honorary Associate of London Film School.

== Filmography ==
As producer

- Mad Dog Morgan (1976)
- The Shout (1978)
- Bad Timing (1980)
- Eureka (1982)
- Merry Christmas, Mr. Lawrence (1982)
- The Hit (1984)
- Insignificance (1984)
- The Last Emperor (1987)
- Everybody Wins (1990)
- The Sheltering Sky (1990)
- Naked Lunch (1991)
- Little Buddha (1993)
- Stealing Beauty (1995)
- A Hundred and One Nights (1995)
- Crash (1996)
- Blood and Wine (1996)
- All the Little Animals (1998) (Also director)
- Sexy Beast (2000)
- Brother (2000)
- Young Adam (2003)
- The Dreamers (2003)
- Tideland (2005)
- Fast Food Nation (2006)
- Franklyn (2008)
- Creation (2009)
- Thirteen Assassins (2010)
- Essential Killing (2010)
- A Dangerous Method (2011)
- Hara-Kiri: Death of a Samurai (2011)
- Kon-Tiki (2012)
- Dom Hemingway (2013)
- Only Lovers Left Alive (2013)
- High-Rise (2015)
- Tale of Tales (2015)
- Blade of the Immortal (2017)
- Dogman (2018)
- First Love (2019)
- Samurai Marathon (2019)
- Pinocchio (2019)
- Traveling Light (2021)
- Good Boy (2025)
- Bad Lieutenant: Tokyo (2026)

Executive producer

- The Great Rock 'n' Roll Swindle (1979)
- Let Him Have It (1991)
- Rough Magic (1995)
- The Ogre (1995)
- Victory (1996)
- The Brave (1997)
- The Cup (1999)
- Gohatto (2000)
- Rabbit-Proof Fence (2002)
- Triumph of Love (2002)
- Travellers and Magicians (2003)
- Promised Land Hotel (2004)
- Dreaming Lhasa (2004)
- Heimat 3 (2004)
- Don't Come Knocking (2004)
- Glastonbury (2005)
- Mister Lonely (2006)
- Joe Strummer: The Future is Unwritten (2007)
- Pina (2010)
- The Man Who Killed Don Quixote (2018)
- Crock of Gold: A Few Rounds with Shane MacGowan (2020)
- EO (2022)
