= Walker Hamilton =

Scottish writer

Walker Hamilton (born 1934 in Airdrie, North Lanarkshire; died February 1969) was a Scottish writer known for the 1968 novella All the Little Animals. He was the son of a coal-miner who left school at fifteen to do National Service, which did not last long due to poor health. In 1960, he married Dorothy and moved to a cottage in Cornwall. He died of a heart attack nine years later.

All the Little Animals is a dark and hard to categorise story about a mentally disabled 31-year-old man-child who runs away from his abusive stepfather and strikes up an unlikely friendship with a strange old man who buries roadkill he finds in the Cornish country lanes. Hamilton also wrote A Dragon's Life about an out-of-work actor on the run, searching for himself while wearing a dragon costume, published posthumously in 1970. The original edition's blurb announced that: "A Dragon's Life is as unclassifiable a novel as was All the Little Animals, and is likely to be as successful. It is sad to know that there will be no further novels from Walker Hamilton's pen, as he died within days of completing this novel at the age of thirty-five."

In 1998, All the Little Animals was adapted for film, starring John Hurt and Christian Bale and directed by Jeremy Thomas. Despite the film reaching out to a wider audience, The Scottish Review of Books points out that "the author and his books have been woefully neglected." As Alan Warner states in his indignant introduction [to the Freight Books 2012 edition]: "The novel remains unmentioned in all the current literary ‘histories’, demonstrating that familiar and destructive inaccuracy as canons are simply engineered from the canons which came before them, rather than from wider reading".
