= The Dreamers (2003 film) =

2003 film by Bernardo Bertolucci

- Italian theatrical release poster
- Directed by: Bernardo Bertolucci
- Screenplay by: Gilbert Adair
- Based on: The Holy Innocents by Gilbert Adair
- Produced by: Jeremy Thomas
- Starring: Michael Pitt; Eva Green; Louis Garrel; Robin Renucci; Anna Chancellor
- Cinematography: Fabio Cianchetti
- Edited by: Jacopo Quadri
- Production companies: Recorded Picture Company; Fiction Cinematografica; Peninsula Films
- Distributed by: TFM Distribution (France); Medusa Distribuzione (Italy); Fox Searchlight Pictures (United Kingdom)
- Release dates: 10 October 2003 (Italy); 10 December 2003 (France); 6 February 2004 (United Kingdom)
- Running time: 115 minutes
- Countries: France; Italy; United Kingdom
- Languages: English; French
- Budget: €15.9 million
- Box office: $23.7 million

The Dreamers (French: Innocents: The Dreamers) is a 2003 erotic romantic drama film directed by Bernardo Bertolucci from a screenplay by Gilbert Adair, based on Adair's 1988 novel The Holy Innocents. An international co-production by companies from France, Italy and the United Kingdom, the film tells the story of an American university student in Paris who, after meeting a peculiar brother and sister who are fellow film enthusiasts, becomes entangled in an erotic triangle.

It is set against the backdrop of the 1968 Paris student riots. The film makes several references to various movies of classical and French New Wave cinema, incorporating clips from films that are often imitated by the actors in particular scenes.

There are two versions: an uncut NC-17-rated version, and an R-rated version that is about three minutes shorter. It was the first credited film appearance of Eva Green, and is considered her breakthrough role.

== Plot ==
In 1968, Matthew is a shy American exchange student who has come to Paris for a year to study French. While at the Cinémathèque Française protesting the firing of its director, Henri Langlois, he meets free-spirited twins Théo and Isabelle, the children of a famous French poet and his English wife. The three bond over a shared love of film. After dinner with their parents, Théo and Isabelle invite Matthew to stay with them while their parents leave town for a month. Matthew accepts, considering them his first French friends.

Matthew becomes suspicious of Théo and Isabelle's relationship after seeing them sleeping nude together; he soon discovers that they have a liberal attitude towards nudity and sexuality. Matthew gradually accepts the twins' unusual relationship and comes to enjoy his time living with them. The three re-enact a memorable scene from Bande à part by "breaking the world record for running through the Louvre", and Matthew and Théo engage in playful arguments about Charlie Chaplin and Buster Keaton, Eric Clapton and Jimi Hendrix, as well as the subject of Maoism, which Théo fervently believes in.

After Théo loses at a trivia game, Isabelle sentences him to masturbate to a Marlene Dietrich poster in front of them. After Matthew loses at another game, Théo tells him to have sex with Isabelle in front of him, which Matthew reluctantly does. Afterwards, he realises she was a virgin, and Théo is pleased. As Matthew and Isabelle fall in love with each other, he asks her what she would do if her parents discovered the nature of her relationship with Théo; she replies that she would kill herself.

Matthew begins to pursue a relationship with Isabelle, separate from Théo. Matthew and Isabelle leave the apartment and go on a regular date, which she has never experienced before. Théo retaliates by inviting a companion up to his room, upsetting Isabelle. She distances herself from both Théo and Matthew, only to find them next to each other on Théo's bed when an argument between the two turns erotic. She then surprises them with a makeshift bedsheet fort and the three fall asleep in each other's arms.

The next morning, Théo and Isabelle's parents arrive home and find the sleeping trio naked in bed together. They are startled by what they find, but let them be, departing after leaving a cheque. Isabelle wakes up and discovers the cheque, realising that their parents have found them out. Wordlessly, she attaches a hose to the gas outlet and lies back down with the still-asleep Théo and Matthew, attempting to commit murder–suicide. Shortly afterwards, however, they are awakened by a brick being hurled through the window; they discover hundreds of students rioting in the streets.

All three of them are overjoyed and proceed to join the protesters. Théo then joins a small team of protesters preparing Molotov cocktails. Matthew tries to stop Théo by kissing him and Isabelle, arguing against violence, but he is shunned by both siblings. As Matthew walks away through the chaos, Théo takes Isabelle's hand and hurls a Molotov cocktail at a line of police. The police charge the crowd.

== Cast ==
- Michael Pitt as Matthew
- Eva Green as Isabelle
- Louis Garrel as Théo
- Anna Chancellor as mother
- Robin Renucci as father
- Jean-Pierre Kalfon as himself
- Jean-Pierre Léaud as himself
- Florian Cadiou as Patrick
- Pierre Hancisse as first buff
- Valentin Merlet as second buff
- Lola Peploe as the usherette
- Ingy Fillion as Théo's girlfriend

== Production ==
The first draft of the screenplay was an adaptation by Gilbert Adair of his own novel, The Holy Innocents (1988), inspired by the novel Les Enfants terribles (1929) by Jean Cocteau and the eponymous film directed by Jean-Pierre Melville in 1950. During pre-production, Bertolucci made changes to it: he "peppered the narrative with clips from the films he loves" and dropped homosexual content – including scenes from the novel that depict Matthew and Théo having sex – which he felt was "just too much." After the film was released, he said that it was "faithful to the spirit of the book but not the letter."

Eva Green was a fan of Bertolucci's work and stated that "even though there were lots of nude scenes, I was desperate to do it. I was like, I don’t care! I loved the story". She recalled that, this was despite she being "not very confident" in her body at that time and even while wearing a swimsuit she used to cover her body using a towel. Green told The Guardian that her agent and her parents begged her not to take the role of Isabelle, concerned that the film – which features full frontal nudity and full rear nudity along with graphic sex scenes – would cause her career to "have the same destiny as Maria Schneider." Jake Gyllenhaal screen tested for the role of Matthew alongside Green, but eventually withdrew himself from consideration due to concerns about the film's nudity. Michael Pitt was cast instead.

When Green saw a rough cut of the film, she said she was "quite shocked" and had to look away during the sex scenes; she later told an interviewer that for her, "it was as though I was wearing a costume while we were making the film. It was as if I had another story in my mind. So I was left speechless." In one scene, the film alludes to the ancient Greek sculpture Venus de Milo, with Green wearing only a white sheet and elbow-length black gloves.

=== Rating ===
Fox Searchlight Pictures gave the uncut version a limited theatrical release in the United States in 2004; it played in 116 theaters at its peak. In the United States, the film was released theatrically with an NC-17 rating, whereas in Italy it was rated VM14. Even with its NC-17 rating, it grossed $2.5 million in its United States theatrical release.

== Music and soundtrack ==
The music advisors were Julien Civange and Charles Henri de Pierrefeu. Janice Ginsberg is credited as music supervisor and Nick Laird-Clowes as music consultant. The soundtrack was released in February 2004; AllMusic gave it three out of five, noting that "while its juxtapositions of French tradition and counterculture are jarring at times, Dreamers still does a worthy job of capturing the film's personal and political revolutions through music."

1. "Third Stone from the Sun" – The Jimi Hendrix Experience
2. "Hey Joe" (cover version) – Michael Pitt & the Twins of Evil
3. "Quatre Cents Coups" (from the score of The 400 Blows) – Jean Constantin
4. "New York Herald Tribune" (from Breathless) – Martial Solal
5. "Love Me Please Love Me" – Michel Polnareff
6. "La Mer" – Charles Trenet
7. "Song For Our Ancestors" – Steve Miller Band
8. "The Spy" – The Doors
9. "Tous les garçons et les filles" – Françoise Hardy
10. "Ferdinand" (from Antoine Duhamel's score of Pierrot le fou)
11. "Dark Star" (special band edit) – Grateful Dead
12. "Non, Je Ne Regrette Rien" – Edith Piaf

Though the music of Janis Joplin and Big Brother and the Holding Company was featured prominently in the film, none of the songs were included on the soundtrack. All of the songs used in the film were from the album Live at Winterland '68. Bob Dylan's song "Queen Jane Approximately", from the album Highway 61 Revisited, is also used in the film but is not included on the soundtrack. The Doors song "Maggie M'Gill" can be heard in the movie, but is not included on the soundtrack either.

== Reception ==
On the review aggregator website Rotten Tomatoes, the film holds an approval rating of 59% based on 164 reviews, with an average rating of 6.5/10. The website's critics consensus reads, "Though lushly atmospheric, The Dreamers doesn't engage or provoke as much as it should." Metacritic, which uses a weighted average, assigned the film a score of 63 out of 100, based on 40 critics, indicating "generally favorable" reviews.

A.O. Scott of The New York Times said the film was "disarmingly sweet and completely enchanting" and described it as "fus[ing] sexual discovery with political tumult by means of a heady, heedless romanticism that nearly obscures the film's patient, skeptical intelligence." The Times called it a "heady blend of Last Tango and Stealing Beauty, but one that combines the grubbily voyeuristic elements of each film rather than their relative strengths." Roger Ebert gave the film four stars, his highest rating, describing the film as "poignant" and "extraordinarily beautiful."

== Home media ==
The Dreamers was released on DVD by 20th Century Fox Home Entertainment in 2004. It includes a BBC film directed by David M. Thompson, Bertolucci Makes The Dreamers, narrated by Zoë Wanamaker, and a documentary Outside the Window: Events in France, May 1968 with contributions from Robin Blackburn, Adair, and Bertolucci.

In March 2024, a 4K restoration completed by Cineteca di Bologna with supervision from the director of photography Fabio Cianchett was released in Ultra HD Blu-ray alongside a re-release in the United Kingdom on May 13, to celebrate the film's 20th anniversary.

== See also ==
- Eros and Civilization
