= All the Little Animals =

- DVD cover
- Directed by: Jeremy Thomas
- Screenplay by: Eski Thomas
- Based on: All the Little Animals by Walker Hamilton
- Produced by: Jeremy Thomas
- Starring: John Hurt; Christian Bale
- Cinematography: Mike Molloy
- Edited by: John Victor-Smith
- Music by: Richard Hartley
- Production companies: Recorded Picture Company; BBC; Isle of Man Film Commission; British Screen; J & M Entertainment
- Distributed by: Entertainment Film Distributors
- Release date: 1998
- Running time: 112 minutes
- Country: United Kingdom
- Language: English
- Box office: $26,558

All the Little Animals is a 1998 drama film directed and produced by Jeremy Thomas and starring Christian Bale and John Hurt. Based on the 1968 novella of the same name by Walker Hamilton, it was adapted for the screen by Eski Thomas.

The film screened in the Un Certain Regard section at the 1998 Cannes Film Festival. It was released in the United States on 3 September 1999.

== Plot ==
The story centers on an emotionally challenged man named Bobby (Christian Bale). He runs away from home in order to escape his abusive stepfather (Daniel Benzali), nicknamed "The Fat", who had killed Bobby's pet mouse and, as Bobby puts it, screamed at his mother until she died as a result. He finds himself in woodlands near Cornwall in England, eventually meeting an old man after being involved in a car accident (John Hurt). Mr. Summers, as the man calls himself, spends his time traveling and giving burials to animals that have been killed by cars, a task he refers to as "The Work". Bobby, also having an affinity for animals, becomes friends with the old man and aids him in his task.

Eventually, the pair return to London to confront "The Fat".

== Cast ==
- John Hurt as Mr. Summers
- Christian Bale as Bobby Platt
- John Higgins as Dean
- Daniel Benzali as Bernard 'The Fat' De Winter
- James Faulkner as Mr. Stuart Whiteside
- John O'Toole as Lorry Driver
- Amanda Boyle as Des
- Amy Robbins as Valerie Ann Platt, Bobby's Mother
- Kaye Griffiths as Lepidopterist
- Sevilla Delofski as Janet, De Winter's Secretary
- Helen Kluger as Ice Cream Vendor
- Shane Barks as Young Bobby
- Sjoerd Broeks as Mark
- Elizabeth Earl as Child in Van
- Andrew Dixon as Philip

== Background ==
Jeremy Thomas, by then an Academy Award-winning producer, later remembered his journey to becoming a director:

I read the book when I was young, in my twenties, and it stayed with me, and I thought for a fiftieth birthday present I would try and make a movie, to direct a film. Which I had always intended to do when I started in the business as an editor, and I was arising to fifty and I had never made a film of my own, although I had been very involved with other people’s films. So I made this film. It was a personal film, because I think it is a nice thing to make a first film about some sort of centre that is important for you, to centre you on the movie and to keep you driven, with an ideology behind the film. So I wanted to make a film about the heart of this book, which is about simple animals that we see every day in nature. It is an antidote to the other movies basically. But I can see that theme in the other movies that I have chosen to produce as well underneath.
