= The Holy Innocents (Adair novel) =

1988 novel by Gilbert Adair

- First edition cover
- Author: Gilbert Adair
- Publisher: Heinemann
- Publication date: 1988
- ISBN: 978-0-434-04578-5

The Holy Innocents (1988) is a novel by Scottish writer Gilbert Adair. It is about three young cinephiles: two French siblings and an American stranger who enters their world. Its themes were inspired by Jean Cocteau's 1929 novel Les Enfants Terribles (The Holy Terrors) and by the 1950 film of the same name directed by Jean-Pierre Melville.

== Plot ==
The Holy Innocents is set in Paris during early 1968. Matthew, an American studying film, becomes friends with Guillaume and Danielle through their shared obsession with cinema, spending much of their time at the Cinémathèque française. When French Culture Minister André Malraux fires Cinémathèque director Henri Langlois, an event that preludes the May 1968 French uprising, the theatre is closed.

Following the closure, Matthew accepts an invitation for dinner and to stay overnight at the night at the twins' home, where he discovers they share an incestuous sexual relationship. When their father, a famous poet, and their stepmother leave for an extended trip to the countryside, Matthew moves in with them.

Unsupervised, the trio isolate themselves from the outside world. They stop attending university, neglect basic hygiene, steal food, and engage in cinematic trivia games with sexual forfeits.

They are finally thrust back into society in May 1968, only to find the siege on the streets as Paris has risen up around them.

== Publication history ==
The book has been printed in hardcover and paperback only once. The Holy Innocents was revised in conjunction with the development of the film, however, and this new version has been published under the title The Dreamers.

== Adaptation ==
A French-British-Italian co-produced film adaptation, The Dreamers, of the novel was made in 2003, directed by Bernardo Bertolucci and starring Louis Garrel, Eva Green, and Michael Pitt.
