= European Film Academy Achievement in World Cinema Award =

The following is a list of the European Film Award winners for Achievement in World Cinema also known as the Outstanding European Achievement in World Cinema:

== Winners ==
Year	Nationality	Recipient	Trade	Ref.
1997	(Czech Republic) / (United States)	Miloš Forman	Director	
1998	(Sweden)	Stellan Skarsgård	Actor	
1999	(Spain)	Antonio Banderas	Actor	
1999	(Poland) / (France)	Roman Polanski	Director	
2000	(France)	Jean Reno	Actor	
2000	(Italy)	Roberto Benigni	Director, actor	
2001	(United Kingdom)	Ewan McGregor	Actor	
2002	(Spain)	Victoria Abril	Actress	
2003	(Italy)	Carlo Di Palma	Cinematographer	
2004	(Norway)	Liv Ullmann	Actress	
2005	(France)	Maurice Jarre	Composer	
2006	(United Kingdom)	Jeremy Thomas	Film producer	
2007	(Germany)	Michael Ballhaus	Cinematographer	
2008	(Denmark)	Søren Kragh-Jacobsen	Director, composer	
2008	(Denmark)	Kristian Levring	Director	
2008	(Denmark)	Lars von Trier	Director	
2008	(Denmark)	Thomas Vinterberg	Director	
2009	(France)	Isabelle Huppert	Actress	
2010	(Lebanon) / (France)	Gabriel Yared	Composer	
2011	(Denmark)	Mads Mikkelsen	Actor	
2012	(United Kingdom)	Helen Mirren	Actress	
2013	(Spain)	Pedro Almodóvar	Director	
2014	(United Kingdom)	Steve McQueen	Director	
2015	(Germany) / (Austria)	Christoph Waltz	Actor, Director	
2016	(Republic of Ireland)	Pierce Brosnan	Actor	
2017	(France)	Julie Delpy	Actress, screenwriter, director	
2018	(United Kingdom)	Ralph Fiennes	Actor, director	
2019	(France)	Juliette Binoche	Actress	
2021	(Denmark)	Susanne Bier	Director	
2022	(Palestine)	Elia Suleiman	Director	
2023	(Spain)	Isabel Coixet	Director	
2024	(Italy)	Isabella Rossellini	Actress	
2026	(Italy)	Alice Rohrwacher	Director, editor, and screenwriter	
