= Fast Food Nation (film) =

- Theatrical release poster
- Directed by: Richard Linklater
- Screenplay by: Richard Linklater; Eric Schlosser
- Based on: Fast Food Nation by Eric Schlosser
- Produced by: Jeremy Thomas; Malcolm McLaren
- Starring: Patricia Arquette; Luis Guzmán; Ethan Hawke; Ashley Johnson; Greg Kinnear; Kris Kristofferson; Catalina Sandino Moreno; Ana Claudia Talancón; Wilmer Valderrama; Bobby Cannavale; Paul Dano; Aaron Himelstein; Avril Lavigne; Bruce Willis
- Cinematography: Lee Daniel
- Edited by: Sandra Adair
- Music by: Friends of Dean Martinez
- Production companies: Fox Searchlight Pictures; Participant Productions; HanWay Films; BBC Films; Recorded Picture Company
- Distributed by: Fox Searchlight Pictures (United States and Canada); Tartan Films (United Kingdom); HanWay Films (international)
- Release date: 17 November 2006
- Running time: 114 minutes
- Countries: United States; United Kingdom
- Language: English
- Box office: $2.2 million

Fast Food Nation is a 2006 drama film directed by Richard Linklater and written by Linklater and Eric Schlosser. An international co-production of the United States and the United Kingdom, it is loosely based on Schlosser's 2001 non-fiction book.

Fast Food Nation was released on 17 November 2006 by Fox Searchlight Pictures in the United States and Canada, Tartan Films in the United Kingdom, and HanWay Films in other territories. The film received mixed reviews from critics and grossed $2.2 million.

== Plot ==
Don Anderson is the Mickey's hamburger chain marketing director who helped develop the "Big One," its most popular menu item. When he learns that independent research has discovered a considerable presence of fecal matter in the meat, he travels to the fictitious town of Cody, Colorado to determine if the local Uni-Globe meatpacking processing plant, Mickey's main meat supplier, is guilty of sloppy production. Don's tour shows him only the pristine work areas and most efficient procedures, assuring him that everything the company produces is immaculate.

Suspicious of the façade he's been shown, Don meets rancher Rudy Martin, who used to supply cattle to the Uni-Globe plant. Rudy and his Chicana housekeeper both assure him that because of the plant's production level, several safety regulations are ignored or worked against; workers have no time to make sure that the manure coming from the intestines stays away from the meat. Don later meets with Harry Rydell, executive VP of Mickey's, who admits being aware of the issue, but is not concerned.

Amber is a young, upbeat employee of Mickey's, studying for college and living with her mother Cindy. While her life seems to be set, she continually faces the contrast between her current career and her own ambition, emphasized by her two lazy co-workers, Brian and Andrew, who, having heard of armed robberies at fast food restaurants in the area, start planning their own.

Amber and Cindy are visited by Cindy's brother Pete, who encourages Amber to leave town and start a real career. Amber eventually meets a group of young activists, Andrew, Alice, and Paco, who plan to liberate cattle from Uni-Globe as their first act of rebellion. They proceed to sneak up to a holding pen at the plant, but after breaking down the fence, they are shocked that the cattle make no attempt to leave. Upon hearing the police, they retreat and contemplate why the cattle decided to stay in confinement.

Raúl, his love interest Sylvia, and Sylvia's sister Coco are illegal immigrants from Mexico, trying to make it in Colorado. They all go to Uni-Globe in hopes of finding a job – Raúl becomes a cleaner, while Coco works on a meat processing conveyor belt. Sylvia, however, cannot take the environment, and instead finds a job as a hotel maid. Coco develops a drug habit, and begins an affair with her exploitative superior, Mike.

In a work accident, a friend of Raúl's falls in a machine, and his leg is mangled. Raúl, attempting to save him, falls and is injured. At the hospital, Sylvia is told that Raúl was on amphetamines at work. Because Raúl is now unable to work, Sylvia has sex with Mike in order to find a job at Uni-Globe. She ends up working on the "kill floor.” As she makes her way through the floor, she sees multiple cows being slaughtered and butchered. Realizing that this is her life now, Sylvia breaks down in tears as she begins her new job.

== Cast ==
- Patricia Arquette as Cindy
- Bobby Cannavale as Mike
- Paul Dano as Brian
- Luis Guzmán as Benny
- Ethan Hawke as Pete
- Ashley Johnson as Amber
- Greg Kinnear as Don Anderson
- Kris Kristofferson as Rudy Martin
- Avril Lavigne as Alice
- Esai Morales as Tony
- Catalina Sandino Moreno as Sylvia
- Lou Taylor Pucci as Gerald "Paco"
- Ana Claudia Talancón as Coco
- Wilmer Valderrama as Raúl
- Bruce Willis as Harry Rydell
- Glen Powell as Steve
- Cherami Leigh as Kim
- Matt Hensarling as Kevin
- Aaron Himelstein as Andrew
- Dana Wheeler-Nicholson as Debi Anderson
- Ellar Coltrane as Jay Anderson
- Marco Perella as Tom Watson
- Roger Cudney as Terry

== Production ==
Author Eric Schlosser was concerned a documentary would water down the book to get television funding so when Jeremy Thomas approached him with the idea to make it a feature film instead they approached Linklater in Austin, Texas. Both Linklater and Schlosser admired the book Winesburg Ohio and used that story telling style as an approach for the film.

The film was shot on location in Austin and Houston, Texas, and Colorado Springs, Colorado, as well as in Mexico. The meat packing plant was in Mexico as well.

== Release ==
The film premiered In Competition at the 2006 Cannes Film Festival on 19 May. It went into limited release in Australia on 26 October 2006.

=== Box office ===
The film opened on 321 screens in the US on 17 November 2006, and earned $410,804 in its opening weekend. It eventually grossed $1,005,539 in the US and $1,203,783 in foreign markets for a total worldwide box office of $2,209,322.

=== Home media ===
The DVD was released on 6 March 2007, and grossed $6.44 million in rentals in its first seven weeks.

== Critical reception ==
Fast Food Nation received mixed reviews. Film review aggregator Rotten Tomatoes indicates that the film has an approval rating of 49%, based on 146 reviews, with an average score of 5.7/10. The site's consensus states, "Despite some fine performances and memorable scenes, Fast Food Nation is more effective as Eric Schlosser's eye-opening non-fiction book than as Richard Linklater's fictionalized, mostly punchless movie." On Metacritic, the film has a score of 64 out of 100 based on reviews from 33 critics, indicating "generally favorable" reviews.

A. O. Scott of The New York Times said about the film, "while it does not shy away from making arguments and advancing a clear point of view, is far too rich and complicated to be understood as a simple, high-minded polemic. It is didactic, yes, but it's also dialectical. While the climactic images of slaughter and butchery — filmed in an actual abattoir — may seem intended to spoil your appetite, Mr. Linklater and Mr. Schlosser have really undertaken a much deeper and more comprehensive critique of contemporary American life ... The movie does not neglect the mute, helpless suffering of the cows, but it also acknowledges the status anxiety of the managerial class, the aspirations of the working poor (legal and otherwise) and the frustrations of the dreaming young. It's a mirror and a portrait, and a movie as necessary and nourishing as your next meal."

Peter Travers of Rolling Stone awarded the film three out of four stars and added, "It's less an exposé of junk-food culture than a human drama, sprinkled with sly, provoking wit, about how that culture defines how we live ... The film is brimming with grand ambitions but trips on many of them as some characters aren't given enough screen time to register and others vanish just when you want to learn more about them."

Ruthe Stein of the San Francisco Chronicle felt "for all the filmmaker's good intentions, Fast Food Nation isn't a particularly good movie. It doesn't hold together or grip you the way a documentary might have. The people are sketchily drawn – just when you start to care about one of them, he or she vanishes. To get the consumer-beware message across, much of the dialogue sounds like preaching, an unnatural way to talk in what's billed as entertainment ... But it does get its message across. You're unlikely to leave the theater with a hankering for a fast food patty of any size."

Todd McCarthy of Variety wrote, "Richard Linklater's rough-hewn tapestry of assorted lives that feed off of and into the American meat industry is both rangy and mangy; it remains appealing for its subversive motives and revelations even as one wishes its knife would have been sharper ... In the end, viewers waiting for an emotional and/or dramatic payoff will be disappointed. As a call-to-arms, it's highly sympathetic but surprisingly mild-mannered."

== Awards and nominations ==
Richard Linklater was nominated for the Palme d'Or at the 2006 Cannes Film Festival, and the Imagen Foundation nominated Wilmer Valderrama Best Actor in Film.

The film won Best Feature Film at the 21st Genesis Awards.

== See also ==
- List of American films of 2006
- The Corporation (film) — a 2003 Canadian documentary film critical of the modern-day corporation and its behavior towards society
