= Fast Food Nation =

2001 book by Eric Schlosser

Fast Food Nation: The Dark Side of the All-American Meal
- First edition
- Author: Eric Schlosser
- Language: English
- Subject: Fast food
- Genre: Non-fiction
- Publisher: Houghton Mifflin
- Publication date: January 17, 2001
- Publication place: United States
- Pages: 288 pp
- ISBN: 0-395-97789-4
- OCLC: 45248356
- Dewey Decimal: 394.1/0973 21
- LC Class: TX945.3 .S355 2001

Fast Food Nation: The Dark Side of the All-American Meal is a 2001 book by Eric Schlosser. First serialized by Rolling Stone in 1999, the book has drawn comparisons to Upton Sinclair's 1906 muckraking novel The Jungle. The book was adapted into a 2006 film, directed by Richard Linklater. The book was reissued by Penguin Classics in 2026.

== Background ==
Rolling Stone asked Schlosser to write an article looking at America through fast food in 1997 after reading his article on migrants in Atlantic Monthly. He then spent nearly three years researching the fast-food industry, from the slaughterhouses and packing plants that turn out the burgers to the minimum-wage workers who cook them to the television commercials that entice children to eat them with the lure of cheap toys and colorful playgrounds. The experience enraged and appalled him.

== Summary ==
The book is divided into two sections: "The American Way" and "Meat and Potatoes". "The American Way" the first part, takes a historical view of the fast food business by analyzing its beginnings within post-World War II America while "Meat and Potatoes" examines the specific mechanisms of the fast-food industry within a modern context as well as its influence.

=== "The American Way" ===
The first section of Fast Food Nation opens with a discussion of Carl N. Karcher and the McDonald brothers, examining their roles as pioneers of the fast-food industry in southern California. This discussion is followed by an examination of Ray Kroc and Walt Disney's complicated relationship before ending with the consideration of the intricate, profitable methods of advertising to children. Next, Schlosser visits Colorado Springs, CO and investigates the life and working conditions of the typical fast-food industry employee, learning how fast-food restaurants pay minimum wage to a higher proportion of their employees than any other American industry.

=== "Meat and Potatoes" ===
The second section of the text begins with a discussion of the chemical components that make the food taste so good. Schlosser follows this with a discussion of the life of a typical rancher, considering the difficulties presented to the agricultural world in a new economy. Schlosser analyzes the meatpacking industry, which he tags as the most dangerous job in America. Moreover, the meat produced by slaughterhouses has become increasingly hazardous since the centralization of the industry due to the way cattle are raised, slaughtered, and processed, providing an ideal setting for E coli to spread. Additionally, working conditions continue to grow worse. In the final chapter, Schlosser considers how fast food has matured as an American cultural export following the Cold War and how the collapse of Soviet Communism allowed the mass spread of American goods and services, especially fast food. As a result, the rest of the world is catching up with America's rising obesity rates.

=== "Afterword" ===
In the 2012 edition, Schlosser published a revised edition that included an afterword. In the afterword, he looks back at the relevance and criticism of the first edition and how it inspired other works as well as how the fast food industry has evolved in the ten years following the book, including its effects on policy and childhood obesity rates. He concluded that, given the swift, decisive and effective action that took place as a result of this interest and intervention, many of the problems documented in the book are solvable, given enough political will. The afterword can also be read in an article penned by Schlosser at The Daily Beast.

== Reception ==
Rob Walker, writing for The New York Times, remarks that "Schlosser is a serious and diligent reporter" and that "Fast Food Nation isn't an airy deconstruction but an avalanche of facts and observations as he examines the fast-food process from meat to marketing." Walker however does raise concerns about the data on which Schlosser bases his claims. For example, Schlosser suggests that hundreds have died from E. coli infections as a result of eating fast food. However, as Walker points out, "[Schlosser] extrapolated his figures from an annual total in a report on food-related illness, which itself relied on a good deal of extrapolation. Moreover, that report doesn't address fast food specifically (and in fact Schlosser builds his numbers from figures including E. coli cases that are not even food-borne), which is relevant because fast-food outlets are hardly the only places where processed meat is sold."

Julia Livshin, writing for The Atlantic, believes "Schlosser's book is not just a compendium of kitchen horror stories. In clean, sober prose packed with facts, he strips away the carefully crafted feel-good veneer of fast food and shows how the industry's astounding success has been achieved, and is sustained, at an equally astounding cost—to the nation's health, environment, economy, and culture."

Publishers Weekly wrote, "While cataloguing assorted evils with the tenacity and sharp eye of the best investigative journalist, [Schlosser] uncovers a cynical, dismissive attitude to food safety in the fast food industry and widespread circumvention of the government's efforts at regulation enacted after Upton Sinclair's similarly scathing novel exposed the meat-packing industry 100 years ago. By systematically dismantling the industry's various aspects, Schlosser establishes a seminal argument for true wrongs at the core of modern America."

The book won the 2002 Firecracker Alternative Book Award for Nonfiction.

=== Industry response ===
Terrie Dort, president of the National Council of Chain Restaurants, the trade association representing many of the country's major fast-food chains, released this statement about Schlosser and his book: "It is unfortunate that Mr. Schlosser's book, 'Fast Food Nation,' categorizes the entire fast-food industry in such a negative light. The restaurant companies that comprise the industry provide employment to hundreds of thousands of workers across the country and offer consumers a wide variety in menu options and prices. We take exception to the characterization in this book."

Lester Crawford, director of the Center for Food and Nutrition Policy at Georgetown University and a former meat inspector for the USDA, says he has read only "snippets" of Schlosser's book but calls it "well-intentioned criticism."

== Chew on This ==
An adaptation of Fast Food Nation for younger readers titled Chew on This: Everything You Don't Want to Know about Fast Food was published in May 2006 by Houghton Mifflin. Chew on This was first published in 2006, is an adaptation of the main work created by Schlosser and Charles Wilson for younger readers. This book follows the general plot structure of Fast Food Nation, but simplifies its predecessor's original content to make it more readable for younger children.

=== Reception ===
Some critical reception has been positive. Common Sense Media gave the book 4/5 stars, but writing that "...the photographs seem randomly placed throughout the book, and the narrative can wander a bit. Even so, teens probably will be inspired to rethink their habits."

== See also ==
- The Corporation (film) — a 2003 Canadian documentary film critical of the modern-day corporation and its behavior towards society
- Labor rights in American meatpacking industry
