= The Sun Behind the Clouds =

- US Film poster
- Directed by: Ritu Sarin; Tenzing Sonam
- Written by: Tenzing Sonam
- Produced by: Ritu Sarin; Caroline Behar; Babeth M. VanLoo
- Starring: The Dalai Lama
- Distributed by: Zeitgeist Films
- Release date: January 2010
- Running time: 79 minutes
- Countries: India; United Kingdom
- Languages: English, Tibetan, and Mandarin

The Sun Behind the Clouds looks at China's occupation of Tibet from the perspective of the vocally secessionist Tibetan youth, and from that of their spiritual leader, the Dalai Lama, whose reaction to the Chinese presence has been markedly less confrontational. Directed by Ritu Sarin and Tenzing Sonam, the film features interviews with the Dalai Lama and Tenzin Tsundue. The Sun Behind the Clouds premiered in the United States at the 2010 Palm Springs International Film Festival before playing at Film Forum in New York City.

The film covers the 2008 Tibetan unrest, including Buddhists' protests in Lhasa and the 2008 Beijing Olympics.
