= Tenzing Sonam =

Tibetan film director

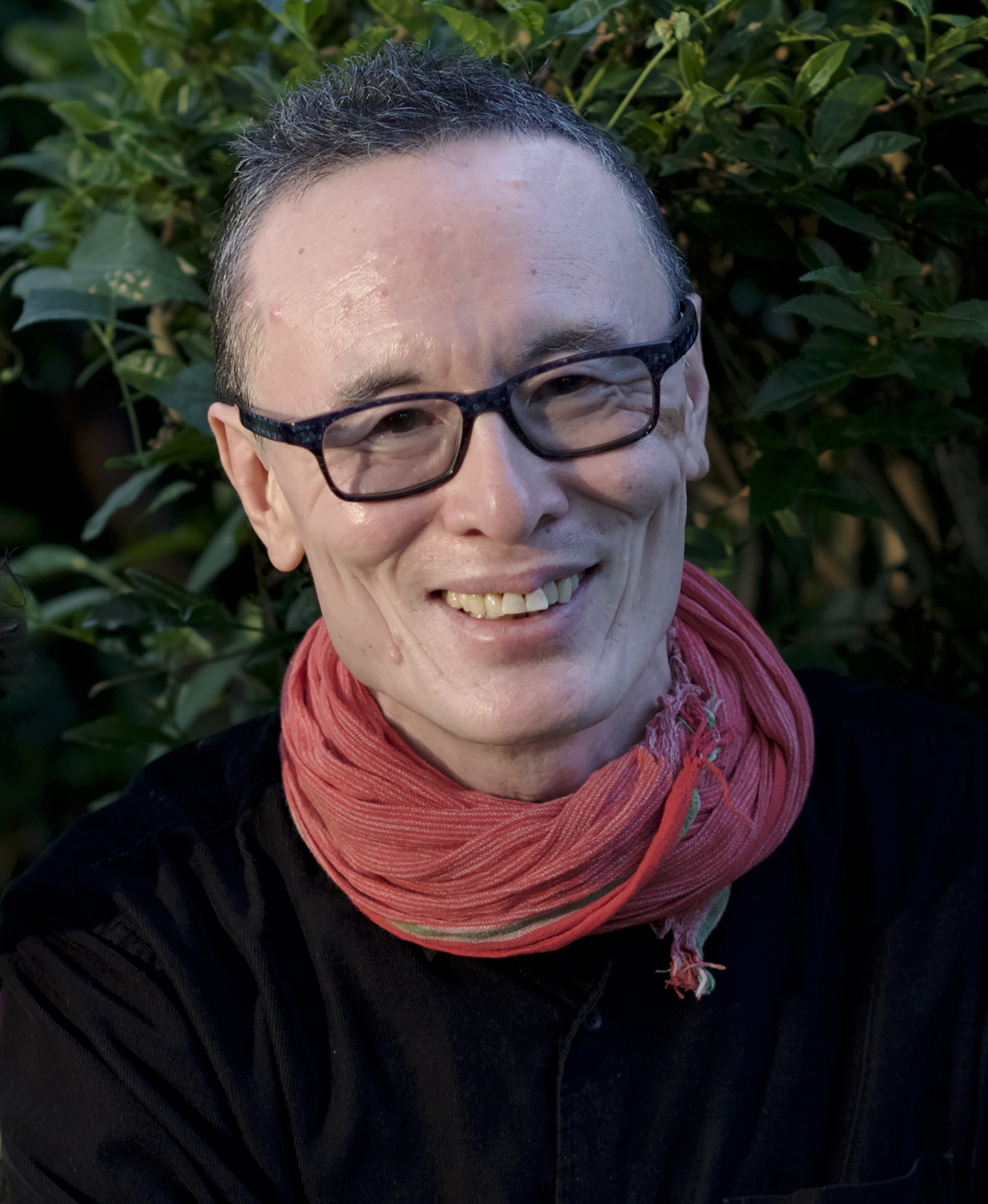

Tenzing Sonam (born 16 January 1959) is a Tibetan film director, writer and essayist based in Dharamshala. He works through his production company, White Crane Films, which he runs with his partner, Ritu Sarin.

== Biography ==
Sonam was born in Darjeeling to Tibetan refugee parents. His father, Lhamo Tsering, who was born in the Kumbum area of Amdo (Chinese: Qinghai Province), served as Chief of Operations for the Tibetan resistance movement from the late 50s until the early 70s, and later, as a Minister in the Dalai Lama’s government-in-exile. His mother, Tashi Dolma, was from a village near Lhasa in central Tibet.

Sonam studied at the Jesuit boarding school, St Joseph’s College, in Darjeeling. He did his undergraduate studies at St Stephens College, Delhi University. After a year each at Scottsdale Community College in Arizona and Santa Monica College in California, he went to the University of California, Berkeley’s Graduate School of Journalism where he specialised in documentary filmmaking.

After graduating from Delhi University in 1978, Sonam worked for a year in the Security Department of the Tibetan government-in-exile in Dharamshala. He then worked as a dishwasher in Manhattan, a gardener in Scottsdale and a janitor in Berkeley. He was the manager of Del Rey Car Wash in Marina del Rey, California, for a year. After graduating from Berkeley, he worked for four years as Programming Director at the Meridian Trust in London, along with his partner Ritu Sarin. In 1991, he and Sarin founded White Crane Films and has made independent films under the banner ever since. In 2012, Sonam and Sarin started the Dharamshala International Film Festival at McLeod Ganj, Himachal Pradesh. The festival ranks amongst the best film festivals of India.

== Films ==
Sonam's first film was the student film, Mark Pauline: Mysteries of a Mechanical Mind (1984), which he co-directed with fellow Berkeley classmates, Steve Evans and John Sergeant. A portrait of maverick Bay Area artist Mark Pauline, the film won Third Place at the 1984 Student Emmys. He made his thesis documentary, The New Puritans: The Sikhs of Yuba City(1985), as a joint project with Ritu Sarin. Since then, all his film have been made in partnership with Sarin. A recurring subject in their work is Tibet, with which they have been intimately involved in a number of different ways: personally, politically and artistically. Through their films and artwork, they have attempted to document, question and reflect on the questions of exile, identity, culture and nationalism that confront the Tibetan people.

Their latest film, The Sweet Requiem, had its world premiere at the 2018 Toronto International Film Festival.

== Writing ==
In addition to his role as a filmmaker, Sonam is an essayist and a writer. In 1979, along with the late writer, K. Dhondup, the scholar Tashi Tsering, Thupten Samphel, Kesang Tenzin and Gyalpo Tsering, he founded the pioneering English-language Tibetan poetry journal titled, Lotus Fields, Fresh Winds. He wrote the scripts for the feature films, Dreaming Lhasa (2005) and The Sweet Requiem (2018). His writings have been published in the Penguin Book of Modern Tibetan Essays, Civil Lines, The Hindu, Time magazine, and Himal Southasian. His travel piece, A Stranger in My Native Land, was published in Written Forever: The Best Of Civil Lines.

== Dharamshala International Film Festival ==
Sonam and Sarin started the Dharamshala International Film Festival in 2012, with the aim of bringing independent cinema to the Himalayan region, encouraging local filmmaking talent, and creating a meaningful cultural platform to engage the area’s diverse communities.

The festival typically screens 26 contemporary features — narratives and documentaries and short, animation and experimental films over 3-4 days in early November in McLeod Ganj. Sonam and Sarin along with a team of cinephiles curated contemporary independent films until 2018. In 2019, the festival began to accept submissions.

== Other activities ==
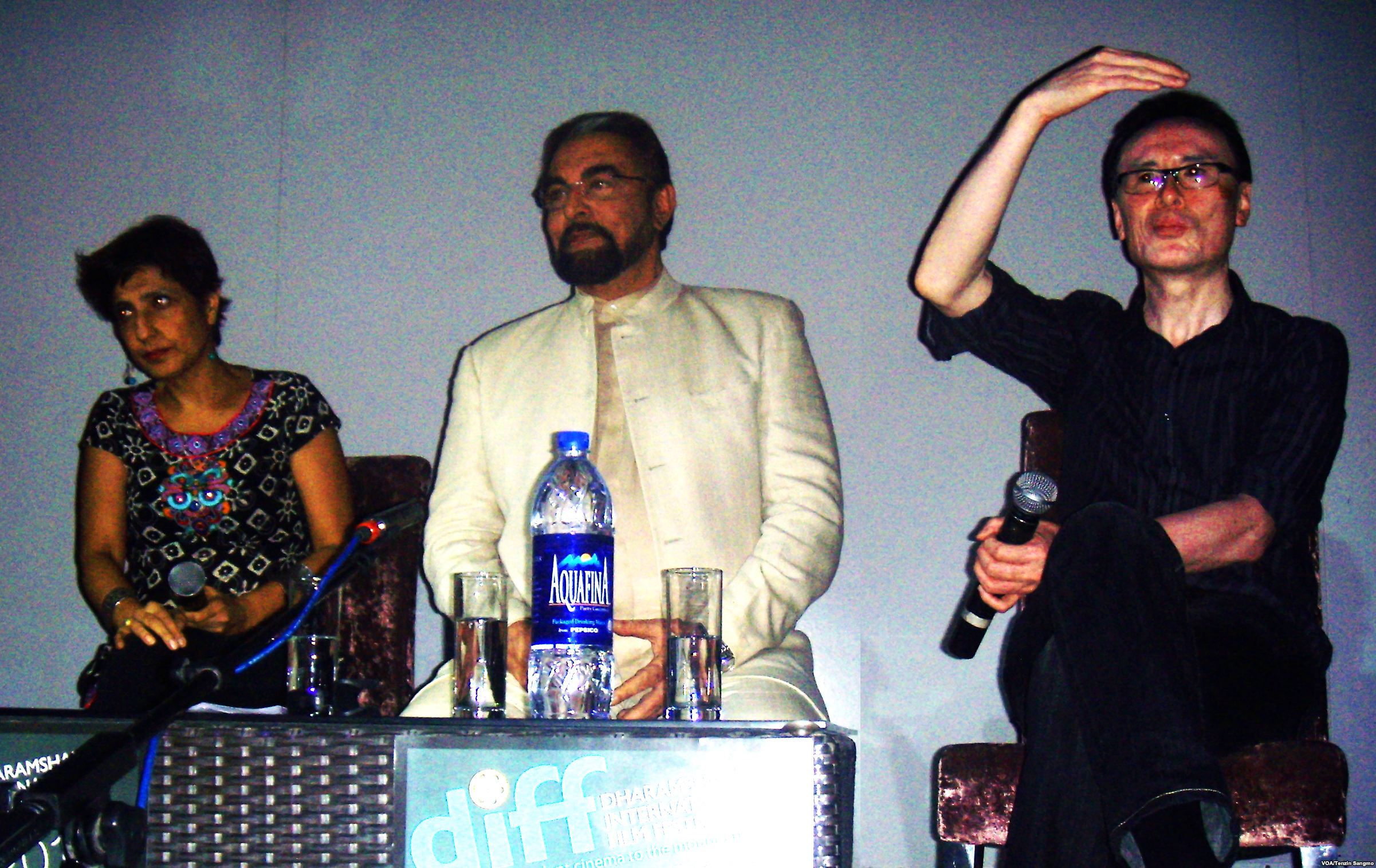
Ritu Sarin, Kabir Bedi and Tenzing Sonam at a press conference in Delhi, 2012

Sonam was a founding member of the Bay Area Friends of Tibet in the San Francisco Bay Area, one of the earliest Tibet support groups in the US.

Sonam and Sarin organised the first-ever Tibet Film Festival in London in March 1992 in collaboration with the Institute for Contemporary Art (ICA). And in March 2000, they organised Tibet 2000: Survival of the Spirit, a ten-day festival of Tibet at the India International Centre in New Delhi, which included film screenings, photographic exhibitions, the creation of a sand mandala, performances by the Tibetan Institute of Performing Arts, seminars and panel discussions by well-known writers and scholars, and a public talk by the Dalai Lama.

Sonam and Sarin participated in the KHOJ Marathon with Hans Ulrich Obrist in New Delhi on 22 January 2011. He was also a part of the Engadin Art Talks in Zuoz, Switzerland, in August 2012, a symposium on art and architecture directed by Beatrix Ruf, director and curator of the Kunsthalle Zurich, and Hans Ulrich Obrist, Co-Director of Exhibitions and Programme at the Serpentine Gallery in London.

In 2012, Sonam and Sarin founded the non-profit organisation, White Crane Arts & Media, to fulfil their long-held desire to promote contemporary art, cinema and independent media practices in the Himalayan regions. Its first project, in collaboration with Khoj International Artists’ Association, was an artists’ residency which was held in Dharamshala in October 2012. Its main project – the Dharamshala International Film Festival – had its first edition in November 2012.

Sonam was awarded a residency at the Rockefeller Institute Bellagio Center.

== Filmography ==
Year	Film
1985	The New Puritans: The Sikhs of Yuba City (27 mins)
1991	The Reincarnation of Khensur Rinpoche (62 mins)
1992	Tibet (15 mins)
1993	The Trials of Telo Rinpoche (50 mins)
1997	Fish Tales (33 mins)
1997	A Stranger in My Native Land (32 mins)
1998	The Shadow Circus: The CIA in Tibet (50 mins)
1999	Big Treasure Chest for Future Children: Tibet (26 mins)
2005	Dreaming Lhasa (90 mins)
2007	The Thread of Karma (50 mins)
2007	Some Questions on the Nature of Your Existence (26 mins)
2009	The Sun Behind the Clouds: Tibet's Struggle For Freedom (79 mins)
2012	When Hari Got Married (75 mins)
2018	The Sweet Requiem (91 mins)
2024	A Little Cloud (25 mins)

== Art projects ==
Year	Work	Commissioned by	Exhibitions
2000	rights... & wrongs (single-channel)	Tibet Museum	Tibet Museum; Contour Biennale 8
2007	Some Questions on the Nature of Your Existence (single-channel)	TBA-21	TBA-21; Mori Art Museum; Busan Biennale 2010; Ravenna Festival
2008	Middle Way or Independence? (single-channel)	TBA-21	TBA-21
2009	A Tibet of the Mind (single-channel)	White Crane Films	Art Centre Silkeborg, Denmark
2011	Mud Stone Slate Bamboo (single-channel)	White Crane Films	Engadin Art Talks, Zuoz, Switzerland; Landings: Extracted Bodies and Self-Cartographies, StudiumGeneraleRietveldAcademie, Amsterdam
2015/17	Burning Against the Dying of the Lights (multimedia)	White Crane Films	Khoj Studios, New Delhi; Contour Biennale 8
2015	Taking Tiger Mountain by Storm (single-channel)	White Crane Films	Khoj Studios, New Delhi; Contour Biennale 8
2017	Drapchi Elegy (single-channel)	Contour Biennale 8	Contour Biennale 8; Kunsthalle Vienna; Marabouparken, Stockholm
2018	Chronicle of an Arrest Foretold (Instagram action)	Artspace Sydney	Instagram Action
2019	Shadow Circus (multimedia)	White Crane Films/Savvy Contemporary	Berlinale Forum Expanded 2019
2022	Shadow Circus: A Personal Archive of Tibetan Resistance (1957–1974)	White Crane Films	India International Centre, New Delhi (additionally supported by International Campaign for Tibet); Kochi-Muziris Biennale Invitations Programme (additionally supported by The Gujral Foundation)
2025	I am the Guardian King of the South	Museo d'Arte Orientale, Torino	On permanent display, Museo d'Arte Orientale, Torino

== See also ==
- Ritu Sarin
- Dharamshala International Film Festival
