= Hara-Kiri: Death of a Samurai =

2011 film by Takashi Miike

- Film poster
- Directed by: Takashi Miike
- Written by: Yasuhiko Takiguchi; Kikumi Yamagishi
- Based on: Harakiri by Masaki Kobayashi
- Produced by: Toshiaki Nakazawa; Jeremy Thomas
- Starring: Ichikawa Ebizō XI; Eita; Kōji Yakusho
- Cinematography: Nobuyasu Kita
- Edited by: Kenji Yamashita
- Music by: Ryuichi Sakamoto
- Production companies: OLM, Inc.; Sedic International; Recorded Picture Company; Shochiku
- Distributed by: Shochiku (Japan)
- Release dates: 19 May 2011 (Cannes); 15 October 2011 (Japan)
- Running time: 126 minutes
- Countries: Japan; United Kingdom
- Language: Japanese

Hara-Kiri: Death of a Samurai (一命, Ichimei) is a 2011 Japanese 3D jidaigeki drama film directed by Takashi Miike. It was produced by Jeremy Thomas and Toshiaki Nakazawa, who previously teamed with Miike on his 2010 film 13 Assassins. The film is a 3D remake of Masaki Kobayashi's 1962 film Harakiri.

It premiered at the 2011 Cannes Film Festival, the first 3D film to do so. The Village Voice's Michael Atkinson praised it describing it as "a melodramatic deepening and a grisly doubling-down of Kobayashi's great original". Composer and pop star Ryuichi Sakamoto wrote the original score.

== Plot ==
In 1635, Hanshiro Tsugumo's clan has lost its status and he requests permission to perform seppuku in the courtyard of the castle of Lord Ii. Senior retainer Kageyu Saitō tells Hanshiro the tale of Squire Motome Chijiiwa, another samurai from the same clan who had visited with the same request the previous year in 1634. Suspecting that he was bluffing in order to obtain money, Ii's retainers scheduled the ritual immediately with Hikokurō Omodaka acting as second. Motome begged for one more day and 3 ryō to treat his sick wife and child. His second, Omodaka sneered at him, asking if that was all he needed and calls him "pathetic." Hurt by the cruel comment to his manhood, Motome Chijiiwa agreed to perform seppuku immediately, but ineffectively as he was made to use his own bamboo sword, breaking it inside his stomach. When Motome Chijiiwa painfully asked for Omodaka to proceed with chopping off his head for the Daki-kubi, Omodaka insisted that he should first cut himself more and each further painful request was sadistically denied by Omodaka who insisted he cut himself deeper first, knowing full well it was impossible to do with a broken bamboo sword. Unable to bear the scene, Saitō eventually rushed forward, pushed Omodaka out of the way, drew his katana and chopped off Motome Chijiiwa's head to end the suffering.

Saitō asks Hanshiro Tsugumo to therefore forget the request but he insists on continuing with the ritual. Hanshiro requests Omodaka as his second, but he cannot be found. His next two requests as second, Matsuzaki and Kawabe, cannot be found either. Knowing something was amiss, Saito accuses Hanshiro Tsugumo of treachery and asked him to reveal his true intentions. Hanshiro scornfully tells them the truth: In June 1617 Motome's father Jinnai Chijiiwa performed unauthorized maintenance work on the castle and was banished. He died and left Motome in the care of Hanshiro Tsugumo. In 1630, Motome married Hanshiro's daughter Miho. Her infant son fell ill and Motome sold his sword to cover costs (hence replacing his swords with bamboo ones) for a while but when a doctor demanded 3 ryo in advance for treatment, Motome attempted the suicide bluff hoping to get money instead, that led to his death. His son died of illness and Miho killed herself with the same broken bamboo sword after Motome's body was returned to her with 3 ryo. Disgusted at the gruesome nature of Motome's death, Hanshiro, an expert swordsman, hunted down Omodaka, Matsuzaki, and Kawabe, challenged them to a duel and forcefully cut off their chonmage topknots for their roles in Motome's painful and sadistic death, causing them to lose face and go into hiding. Hanshiro Tsugumo sneered that the three samurai who sneered at his son-in-law, Motome Chijiiwa, for not being true samurai in begging for money and undertaking a suicide bluff when he was facing such suffering and desperation, are hypocritical and not true samurai themselves, as losing their chonmage topknots was the ultimate dishonor for a samurai and instead of honorably committing seppuku to expiate the shame, they were hiding themselves in their quarters until their topknots grew back and called their behavior "pathetic," in the same way they had insulted Motome Chijiiwa.

Hanshiro shows the assembly the three disgraced samurai topknots that were neatly labeled with their names, throws the 3 ryo back to Saitō and says that a warrior's honor is not something just worn for show - and challenges the assembled samurai with a bamboo sword, battling many of them capably. In the course of fighting, he knocks down the castle's decorative suit of armor before accepting death. The Ii samurai barge into Omodaka's, Matsuzaki's and Kawabe's quarters and they were caught looking disheveled and without their topknots, hence proving Hanshiro Tsugumo's story. Their disgrace publicly exposed, Omodaka, Matsuzaki and Kawabe stab themselves to death due to shame and the other retainers reassemble the suit of armor. Lord Ii returns to the castle and asks if the suit of armor has been polished, because it is the pride of the castle.

== Cast ==
- Ichikawa Ebizō XI as Hanshiro Tsugumo
- Eita as Motome Chijiiwa
- Hikari Mitsushima as Miho Tsugumo
- Naoto Takenaka as Tajiri
- Munetaka Aoki as Hikokurō Omodaka
- Hirofumi Arai as Hayatonoshō Matsuzaki
- Kazuki Namioka as Umenosuke Kawabe
- Yoshihisa Amano as Sasaki
- Takehiro Hira as Ii Kamon-no-kami Naotaka
- Takashi Sasano as Sōsuke
- Nakamura Baijaku II as Jinnai Chijiiwa
- Kōji Yakusho as Kageyu Saitō

== Awards and nominations ==
Award ceremony	Category	Recipients	Result
6th Asian Film Awards	Best Original Music	Ryuichi Sakamoto	Nominated
