= Ritu Sarin =

Indian film director, producer and artist

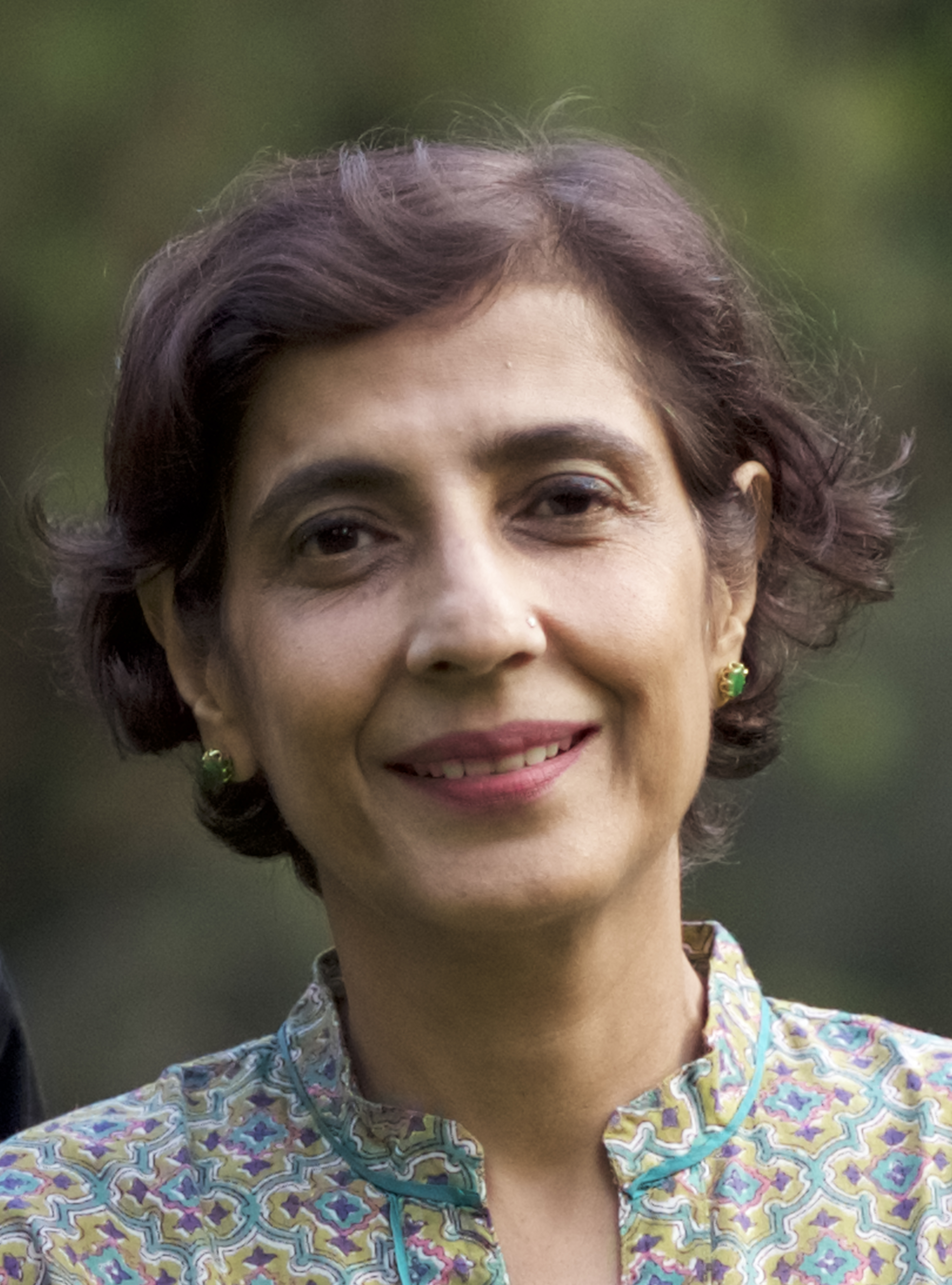
Ritu Sarin

Ritu Sarin is an Indian film director, producer and artist based in Dharamshala, India. She is the director of the Dharamshala International Film Festival.

== Biography ==
Sarin was born in New Delhi. She did her undergraduate studies at Miranda House in Delhi University and went on to do her MFA in Film and Video from California College of the Arts (formerly California College of Arts and Crafts) in Oakland. She is the recipient of Miranda House’s 2010 Distinguished Alumna Award. She is married to Tibetan filmmaker Tenzing Sonam with whom she has two children.

== Films ==
While at CCA, Sarin made a number of experimental films, including Hercules and The Mind Gap.

In 1985, Sarin and Tenzing Sonam worked on their first film together, The New Puritans: The Sikhs of Yuba City, as a joint thesis project. The film was subsequently broadcast on national PBS.

In 1987, Sarin and Sonam moved to London were they worked as programme directors at the Meridian Trust, a Buddhist and Tibet-related film archive and production company. While at the Meridian Trust, they documented a number of historic trips made by the Dalai Lama, including his Nobel Peace Prize visit to Norway and his first trip to the Russian Buddhist republics of Kalmykia and Buryatia. They left the Meridian Trust in 1991 and founded their own company, White Crane Films. All their films since then have been made under its banner and includes several documentaries, video installations and two dramatic feature films.

A recurring subject in their work is Tibet, with which they have been intimately involved in a number of different ways: personally, politically and artistically. Through their films and artwork, they have attempted to document, question and reflect on the questions of exile, identity, culture and nationalism that confront the Tibetan people.

Their latest film, The Sweet Requiem, had its world premiere at the 2018 Toronto International Film Festival.

== Filmography ==
Year	Film
1985	The New Puritans: The Sikhs of Yuba City (27 mins)
1991	The Reincarnation of Khensur Rinpoche (62 mins)
1992	Tibet (15 mins)
1993	The Trials of Telo Rinpoche (50 mins)
1997	Fish Tales (33 mins)
1997	A Stranger in My Native Land (32 mins)
1998	The Shadow Circus: The CIA in Tibet (50 mins)
1999	Big Treasure Chest for Future Children: Tibet (26 mins)
2005	Dreaming Lhasa (90 mins)
2007	The Thread of Karma (50 mins)
2007	Some Questions on the Nature of Your Existence (26 mins)
2009	The Sun Behind the Clouds: Tibet's Struggle For Freedom (79 mins)
2012	When Hari Got Married (75 mins)
2018	The Sweet Requiem (91 mins)
2024	A Little Cloud (25 mins)

== Art projects ==
Year	Work	Commissioned by	Exhibitions
2000	rights... & wrongs (single-channel)	Tibet Museum	Tibet Museum; Contour Biennale 8
2007	Some Questions on the Nature of Your Existence (single-channel)	TBA-21	TBA-21; Mori Art Museum; Busan Biennale 2010; Ravenna Festival; Istanbul Biennial 2022; Museo d'arte Orientale Torino 2022
2008	Middle Way or Independence? (single-channel)	TBA-21	TBA-21
2009	A Tibet of the Mind (single-channel)	White Crane Films	Art Centre Silkeborg, Denmark
2011	Mud Stone Slate Bamboo (single-channel)	White Crane Films	Engadin Art Talks, Zuoz, Switzerland; Landings: Extracted Bodies and Self-Cartographies, StudiumGeneraleRietveldAcademie, Amsterdam
2015/17	Burning Against the Dying of the Lights (multimedia)	White Crane Films	Khoj Studios, New Delhi; Contour Biennale 8
2015	Taking Tiger Mountain by Storm (single-channel)	White Crane Films	Khoj Studios, New Delhi; Contour Biennale 8
2017	Drapchi Elegy (single-channel)	Contour Biennale 8	Contour Biennale 8; Kunsthalle Vienna; Marabouparken, Stockholm; Mardin Biennial
2018	Chronicle of an Arrest Foretold (Instagram action)	Artspace Sydney	Instagram Action
2019	Shadow Circus (multimedia)	White Crane Films/Savvy Contemporary	Berlinale Forum Expanded 2019, India International Centre 2022
2022	Shadow Circus: A Personal Archive of Tibetan Resistance (1957–1974)	White Crane Films	India International Centre, New Delhi (additionally supported by International Campaign for Tibet); Kochi-Muziris Biennale Invitations Programme (additionally supported by The Gujral Foundation)
2025	I am the Guardian King of the South	Museo d'Arte Orientale, Torino	On permanent display, Museo d'Arte Orientale, Torino

== Other activities ==
Ritu was a founding member of the Bay Area Friends of Tibet in the San Francisco Bay Area, one of the earliest Tibet support groups in the US.

She and Tenzing organised the first-ever Tibet Film Festival in London in March 1992 in collaboration with the Institute for Contemporary Art (ICA). And in March 2000, they organised Tibet 2000: Survival of the Spirit, a ten-day festival of Tibet at the India International Centre in New Delhi, which included film screenings, photographic exhibitions, the creation of a sand mandala, performances by the Tibetan Institute of Performing Arts, seminars and panel discussions by well-known writers and scholars, and a public talk by the Dalai Lama.

Ritu participated in the KHOJ Marathon with Hans Ulrich Obrist in New Delhi on 22 January 2011. She was also a part of the Engadin Art Talks in Zuoz, Switzerland, in August 2012, a symposium on art and architecture directed by Beatrix Ruf, director and curator of the Kunsthalle Zurich, and Hans Ulrich Obrist, Co-Director of Exhibitions and Programme at the Serpentine Gallery in London.

In 2012, Ritu and Tenzing founded the non-profit organisation, White Crane Arts & Media, to fulfil their long-held desire to promote contemporary art, cinema and independent media practices in the Himalayan regions. Its first project, in collaboration with Khoj International Artists’ Association, was an artists’ residency which was held in Dharamshala in October 2012. Its main project – the Dharamshala International Film Festival – had its first edition in November 2012 and is now considered to be one of India's top independent film festivals.

Ritu was awarded a residency at the Rockefeller Institute Bellagio Center in 2017.

She served on the jury for the International Competition section of the 2019 Sydney Film Festival.

== See also ==
- Dreaming Lhasa
- Dharamshala International Film Festival
- Tenzing Sonam
