= Dom Hemingway =

- UK release poster
- Directed by: Richard Shepard
- Written by: Richard Shepard
- Produced by: Jeremy Thomas
- Starring: Jude Law; Richard E. Grant; Demián Bichir; Emilia Clarke
- Cinematography: Giles Nuttgens
- Edited by: Dana Congdon
- Music by: Rolfe Kent
- Production companies: BBC Films; Isle of Man Film; Pinewood Pictures; Recorded Picture Company
- Distributed by: Lionsgate
- Release dates: 8 September 2013 (TIFF); 15 November 2013 (United Kingdom)
- Running time: 93 minutes
- Country: United Kingdom
- Language: English
- Budget: $7 million
- Box office: $1.3 million

Dom Hemingway is a 2013 British black comedy–crime drama film directed and written by Richard Shepard, and starring Jude Law, Richard E. Grant, Demián Bichir and Emilia Clarke. It was shown at the 2013 Toronto International Film Festival.

== Plot ==
Safecracker Dom Hemingway (Jude Law) is released after spending 12 years in prison and seeks payment for refusing to rat out his boss Ivan Fontaine (Demián Bichir). He reunites with his best friend Dickie (Richard E. Grant) and they travel to Fontaine's villa in the French countryside. Dom flirts with Fontaine's Romanian girlfriend Paolina (Mădălina Diana Ghenea) and becomes angry that he spent 12 years in jail for Fontaine. He begins to mock Fontaine and storms out. At dinner, he apologises and Fontaine presents Dom with £750,000.

They spend the night partying with two girls, one of whom, Melody (Kerry Condon) strikes up a conversation with Dom. When the group go driving in Fontaine's car, they crash into another car. While unconscious, Dom has a vision of Paolina asking for his money. He wakes up, resuscitates Melody, and finds Fontaine impaled on the car's fender. Melody tells Dom that, because he saved her, he shall gain good luck when he least expects it.

Dom and Dickie head back to the mansion, where they find Paolina has taken Dom's money, but they see her leaving in a car. Dom runs through the forest and into the road, where he is almost hit by Paolina. She asks him if she strikes him as a woman who wants to be poor, and drives away.

A few days later, Dom returns to London and collapses outside the apartment of his estranged daughter, Evelyn (Emilia Clarke). He wakes up and Evelyn's boyfriend Hugh (Nathan Stewart-Jarrett) introduces Dom to his grandson, Jawara. Hugh says that Evelyn is upset that Dom left her and was in prison, missing out on her childhood and his wife Katherine's death. Hugh suggests Dom visit Evelyn after her concert at a local club and attempt to reconcile. He goes to the concert, but leaves and meets Dickie. Dom says he wants to work for Lestor McGreevy Jr., the son of Fontaine's old rival. Dickie says Lestor is even worse than his father, but Dom says he needs work. Dom follows Lestor on his daily jog and learns Lestor holds a grudge for Dom killing his cat when he was a child. After following and arguing with Lestor, he finally tells Dom to go to his club that night. They make a bet. If he opens an electronic safe he gets work, if he fails to open it in 10 minutes, Lestor will cut off his genitalia.

Dom and Dickie go to Lestor's club and Dom opens a safe in 10 minutes with a sledgehammer, only to learn the real safe is inside that safe. Before Lestor can cut off Dom's penis, Dickie smashes Lestor on the head with a statue and Dom knocks out his thugs with the sledgehammer. They run away from Lestor's club and Dom goes back to the local club where Evelyn was performing. There, Evelyn tells Dom he would only have spent three years in prison if he had ratted on Fontaine; because he didn't, he missed out on her childhood and her mother dying. Evelyn tells Dom that all she wanted was a real father. She turns her back on him and leaves. The next day, Dom sees Melody on her scooter and says he hasn't received good luck. She says it will come soon.

Dom visits the grave of his wife Katherine and apologises. He turns and sees his grandson Jawara sitting next to him. He walks Jawara out of the cemetery and takes him back to Evelyn. He asks if he can walk with them in silence, but she says they have to hurry home. She says Dom can take Jawara to school on Monday if he doesn't get drunk on Sunday night. As they walk away, Jawara waves to Dom, who waves back. He walks in the opposite direction and sees Paolina enter a restaurant with an older man. He enters the restaurant and grips Paolina's hand. He whispers threats and continues to clutch her hand, before leaving he kisses her. As he leaves the restaurant, he smiles as it is revealed that he has stolen Paolina's diamond ring.

== Cast ==
- Jude Law as Dom Hemingway, a safe-cracker just released from prison out to get his reward for keeping silent.
- Richard E. Grant as Dickie Black, Dom's devoted best friend.
- Demián Bichir as Ivan Anatolievich Fontanov / Mr. Fontaine, a crime boss holed up outside St. Tropez.
- Emilia Clarke as Evelyn Hemingway, Dom's estranged daughter.
- Kerry Condon as Melody, the lucky penny.
- Jumayn Hunter as Lestor, the son of Dom's nemesis.
- Mădălina Diana Ghenea as Paolina, the femme fatale.
- Nathan Stewart-Jarrett as Hugh, Evelyn's musician boyfriend.

== Production ==
Principal photography took place in the Autumn of 2012 in St Tropez, Isle of Man and London locations, The Historic Dockyard Chatham and Pinewood Studios. The film was produced by Academy Award-winner Jeremy Thomas at Recorded Picture Company, with BBC Films as financier.

Jude Law gained 13 kilograms (29 lb) weight for his character.

== Reception ==
Dom Hemingway received mixed reviews. It holds a 58% rating on review aggregator site Rotten Tomatoes, with an average score of 6/10, based on 125 reviews. The website's critical consensus states: "Jude Law is clearly having fun in Dom Hemingway's title role, but viewers may find this purposely abrasive gangster dramedy isn't quite as enjoyable from the other side of the screen." Metacritic gives the film a weighted average score of 55 out of 100, based on 37 critics, indicating "mixed or average reviews".
