= Stealing Beauty =

1996 film by Bernardo Bertolucci

- Theatrical release poster
- Directed by: Bernardo Bertolucci
- Screenplay by: Susan Minot
- Story by: Bernardo Bertolucci
- Produced by: Jeremy Thomas
- Starring: Jeremy Irons; Liv Tyler; Sinéad Cusack; Jean Marais; Donal McCann; D. W. Moffett; Stefania Sandrelli; Rachel Weisz
- Cinematography: Darius Khondji
- Edited by: Pietro Scalia
- Music by: Richard Hartley
- Production companies: Fox Searchlight Pictures; Recorded Picture Company; UGC Images
- Distributed by: Cecchi Gori Distribuzione (Italy); UGC Fox Distribution (France); 20th Century Fox (United Kingdom)
- Release dates: 29 March 1996 (Italy); 16 May 1996 (France); 23 August 1996 (United Kingdom)
- Running time: 113 minutes; 119 minutes (DVD)
- Countries: France; Italy; United Kingdom
- Languages: English; French; Italian; Spanish; German
- Box office: $12.7 million (Italy/US/UK)

Stealing Beauty (French: Beauté volée, lit. 'Stolen Beauty'; Italian: Io ballo da sola, lit. 'I Dance Alone') is a 1996 coming-of-age drama film directed by Bernardo Bertolucci and starring Jeremy Irons, Liv Tyler, Sinéad Cusack, Jean Marais, Donal McCann, D. W. Moffett, Stefania Sandrelli and Rachel Weisz. Written by Bertolucci and Susan Minot, the film is about a 19-year-old American girl who travels to a lush Tuscan villa near Siena to stay with family friends of her poet mother, who recently died. It is an international co-production of France, Italy and the United Kingdom.

Stealing Beauty was released in Italy in March 1996, and was officially selected for the 1996 Cannes Film Festival in May. It was released in the United States on 14 June 1996.

The film was made entirely in the Tuscany region of Italy during the summer of 1995. The main location for filming was the estate of Castello di Brolio, and a small villa on the property.

== Plot ==
Lucy, the nineteen-year-old daughter of the recently deceased American poet and model Sara Harmon, arrives at the Tuscan villa of her mom's friends Ian and Diana Grayson. Other guests include a New York art gallery owner, an Italian advice columnist and a dying English writer, Alex Parrish.

Lucy goes for a swim and finds Diana's daughter Miranda with her boyfriend, entertainment lawyer Richard Reed. Her brother, Christopher, has yet to arrive and is on a road trip with Niccolò Donati, from a nearby villa. Lucy hoped to see Niccolò, as she had met him four years before and he was her first kiss. They had briefly written, and Lucy had memorized one letter of his in particular.

Lucy's father sent her so Ian could sculpt her, but she says it's really just an excuse for him to send her to Italy. Smoking marijuana with Parrish, Lucy reveals she is a virgin, which he shares with the rest of the villa the next day. Furious, Lucy decides to end her visit. However, before she can book the flight, Christopher and Niccolò appear, and Lucy is happy, but disappointed Niccolò did not recognize her.

That evening, Niccolò and his brother, Osvaldo come to the Graysons'. After dinner, the youth separate from the adults to smoke marijuana. Lucy is now over Parrish's betrayal, and they take turns recounting how they each lost their virginity. When it's Osvaldo's turn, he demurs, saying, "I don't know which is more ridiculous, this conversation or the silly political one going on over there [at the adults' table]." Lucy fawns over Niccolò, but then vomits in his lap.

The next day, Lucy cycles to the Donatis', seeking Niccolò. She's told he's in the garden, where Lucy finds him with another. Upset, she hastily cycles away from the compound. When she passes Osvaldo, he cries out, "Ciao, Lucy!", but she doesn't hear and then crashes. Ignoring his offer to help, she rides on.

Lucy, posing outdoors for Ian's sketch, exposes one of her breasts. When Niccolò and Osvaldo arrive by car, Niccolò ogles Lucy, but Osvaldo looks away. Lucy wanders off into an adjacent olive grove, followed by Niccolò. They begin to kiss, but Lucy soon pushes him away.

Retreating to the guest house, Lucy shares her notebook with Parrish. It is one of her mother's last notebooks, containing a poem Lucy thinks holds clues to the identity of her real father. Throughout the film, she has been asking probing questions about her mother. Did Parrish ever know Sara to wear green sandals? Had Ian ever eaten olive leaves? Had Carlo Lisca, a war correspondent friend of the Graysons whom Sara had known, ever killed a viper? These images are all found in the poem, which Lucy now reads to Parrish. He agrees it must refer to her dad.

That evening, Lucy wears her mother's dress to the Donatis' annual party. Soon after arriving, she sees Niccolò with another girl, and they do not speak. Then she sees Osvaldo playing clarinet in the band. Later, seeing him dancing with a girl, they exchange earnest glances. Lucy picks up a young Englishman to take back to the Graysons' villa. On the way out, Osvaldo chases Lucy down, saying he's interested in visiting America. They agree to meet the next day. The Englishman spends the night with her at the villa, but without having sex.

The next day, Parrish is hospitalized. Lucy skulks around his quarters in the guest house afterward. Looking out a window, seeing Ian's sculpture of a mother and child, she has an epiphany. Lucy asks Ian where he was in August 1975, when she was conceived. He says he was here, fixing up the villa, possibly when he was doing Lucy's mother's portrait. He says they could ask Diana, but then remembers she was in London, finalizing her divorce. They realize Ian is Lucy's biological father, and she promises to keep the secret.

Meanwhile, Osvaldo arrives. Lucy gets stung by bees as she exits Ian's studio, so he helps, putting clay on the welts. Walking through the countryside, Osvaldo confesses he wrote to her once. This was the letter Lucy loved above all, the one she knew by heart. Osvaldo then takes her to the tree from the letter.

Lucy and Osvaldo spend the night having sex under the tree. As they part the next morning, Osvaldo reveals that it was his first time, too.

== Cast ==
- Sinéad Cusack as Diana Grayson
- Jeremy Irons as Alex Parrish
- Jean Marais as M. Guillaume
- Donal McCann as Ian Grayson
- D. W. Moffett as Richard Reed, a married entertainment lawyer who is having an affair with Miranda
- Stefania Sandrelli as Noemi, an Italian advice columnist
- Rachel Weisz as Miranda Fox, Diana's adult daughter from a previous marriage
- Liv Tyler as Lucy Harmon
- Carlo Cecchi as Carlo Lisca
- Joseph Fiennes as Christopher Fox, Diana's adult son from a previous marriage
- Jason Flemyng as Gregory, an Englishman whom Lucy briefly meets
- Anna Maria Gherardi as Chiarella Donati
- Ignazio Oliva as Osvaldo Donati
- Francesco Siciliano as Michele Lisca
- Leonardo Treviglio as lieutenant
- Rebecca Valpy as Daisy Grayson, Ian and Diana's young daughter
- Alessandra Vanzi as Marta
- Roberto Zibetti as Niccolò Donati
- Mary Jo Sorgani as Maria

== Production ==
Liv Tyler admitted she bitterly fought against appearing topless in the film. "Of course the thought of showing your body parts is a terrifying thought – I find it terrifying. Let alone the whole world. And I fought it until the very end."

== Soundtrack ==
1. "2Wicky" (Burt Bacharach) by Hooverphonic
2. "Glory Box" by Portishead
3. "If 6 Was 9" (Jimi Hendrix) by Axiom Funk
4. "Annie Mae" by John Lee Hooker
5. "Rocket Boy" by Liz Phair
6. "Superstition" by Stevie Wonder
7. "My Baby Just Cares for Me" (Walter Donaldson) by Nina Simone
8. "I'll Be Seeing You" (Sammy Fain) by Billie Holiday
9. "Rhymes of an Hour" (Hope Sandoval) by Mazzy Star
10. "Alice" by Cocteau Twins
11. "You Won't Fall" by Lori Carson
12. "I Need Love" by Sam Phillips
13. "Say It Ain't So" by Roland Gift
14. "Horn concerto in D K412, 2nd movement" by Wolfgang Amadeus Mozart
15. "Clarinet concerto in A K622, 2nd movement" by Wolfgang Amadeus Mozart

Additional songs

- "Rock Star" by Hole was also used in the film. Tyler is shown dancing and singing along to the track, listening with her headphones and walkman.
- Björk's song "Bachelorette" of her 1997 album Homogenic was originally written to be part of the soundtrack and its first working title was "Bertolucci". Björk later faxed Bertolucci to inform him the song would be used on her upcoming album instead.

== Reception ==
=== Box office ===
Stealing Beauty was the third highest-grossing Italian film of 1996 with a gross of $6.5 million. In the United Kingdom, it grossed £879,695 ($1.5 million). It had admissions in France of 184,721. In the United States and Canada, the film grossed $4.7 million.

=== Critical response ===
Roger Ebert of the Chicago Sun-Times gave the film two out of four, and wrote: "The movie plays like the kind of line a rich older guy would lay on a teenage model, suppressing his own intelligence and irony in order to spread out before her the wonderful world he would like to give her as a gift....The problem here is that many 19-year-old women, especially the beautiful international model types, would rather stain their teeth with cigarettes and go to discos with cretins on motorcycles than have all Tuscany as their sandbox."

Critics such as Desson Thomson of The Washington Post, Mick LaSalle of the San Francisco Chronicle, and James Berardinelli of ReelViews gave negative reviews, with Berardinelli in particular, calling the film "an atmosphere study, lacking characters", and Thompson calling it "inscrutable".

Others, such as Jonathan Rosenbaum of the Chicago Reader, Peter Travers of Rolling Stone, Janet Maslin of The New York Times, and Jack Mathews of the Los Angeles Times were more positive, with Rosenbaum in particular praising the movie's "mellowness" and "charm".

On the website Rotten Tomatoes, the film holds an approval rating of 50% based on 50 reviews, with an average rating of 6/10. Metacritic, which uses a weighted average, assigned the film a score of 60 out of 100, based on 20 critics, indicating "mixed or average" reviews. Audiences surveyed by CinemaScore gave the film a grade "B−" on scale of A to F.
