= Dharamshala International Film Festival =

Annual film festival held in India

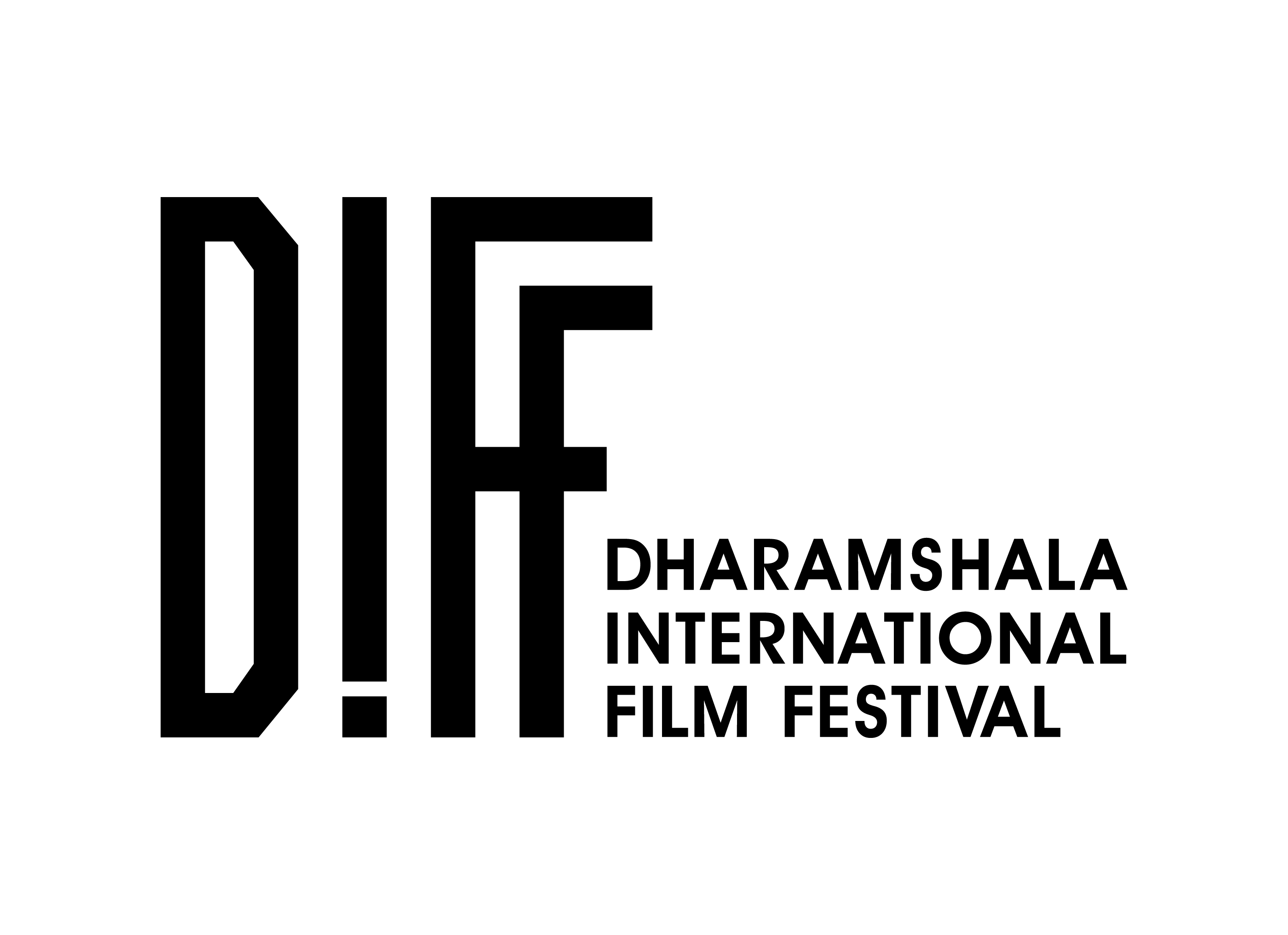
- Location: McLeod Ganj, Himachal Pradesh, India
- Founded: 2012
- Founded by: Ritu Sarin & Tenzing Sonam
- Artistic director: Bina Paul
- Festival date: 4–7 November
- Website: diff.co.in

The Dharamshala International Film Festival (DIFF) is an international film festival held annually in the Himalayan town McLeod Ganj, Dharamshala in India — home to the Dalai Lama and the Tibetan community in exile since 2012. The 13th edition of DIFF was held from 7 to 10 November 2024, in McLeodganj, Dharamshala.

== History ==
The festival was founded by filmmakers Ritu Sarin and Tenzing Sonam in 2012 to promote contemporary cinema, art and independent media practices in the Himalayan region. DIFF also aims to encourage local filmmaking talent and create a meaningful platform to engage with the area's diverse communities.

The DIFF Film Fellows Programme was established in 2014 to give opportunities to up-and-coming filmmakers from the Himalayan region to receive mentorship sessions from filmmakers such as Gurvinder Singh, Anupama Srinivasan, Umesh Kulkarni, Kesang Tseten and Hansal Mehta.

Since 2016 DIFF has partnered with Kangra-based organisations to organise community screenings in villages, schools, colleges and the District Jail. A Film Appreciation Competition introduced to students in the area the concept of actively and critically engaging with cinema.

DIFF partnered with the Festival des 3 Continents’ Produire au Sud (PAS) to launch the first edition of Filmlab South Asia in Dharamshala in 2022. The training workshop focused on the development and packaging of film projects suitable for international co-productions for emerging producer–director teams. Second edition of the lab was held from 31 October to 4 November, 2023 in Dharamshala.

DIFF announced its inaugural Advisory Board in September 2020. The board of advisors include Adil Hussain, Arun Sarin, Asif Kapadia, Guneet Monga, Francesca Thyssen-Bornemisza and Sushil Chaudhary

== Programme & Format ==
The 12th edition of DIFF was a hybrid event

The 12th edition of Dharamshala International Film Festival showcased 93 films from 40+ countries, including 31 feature narratives, 22 feature documentaries, and 40 short films at 4 venues. The on-ground festival was followed by an online festival that lasted 8 days.

2019 the festival has accepted film submissions from India and around the world. The festival is well known for its intimate and warm atmosphere where filmmakers and attendees can converse freely. DIFF features many Indian premieres of international films and does not have a competition section. DIFF's shorts programme has been curated by Umesh Kulkarni. Since 2014, the festival has introduced a children's programme curated by Monica Wahi.

Bina Paul, a noted film-editor and programmer joined DIFF as Director of Programming in 2023.

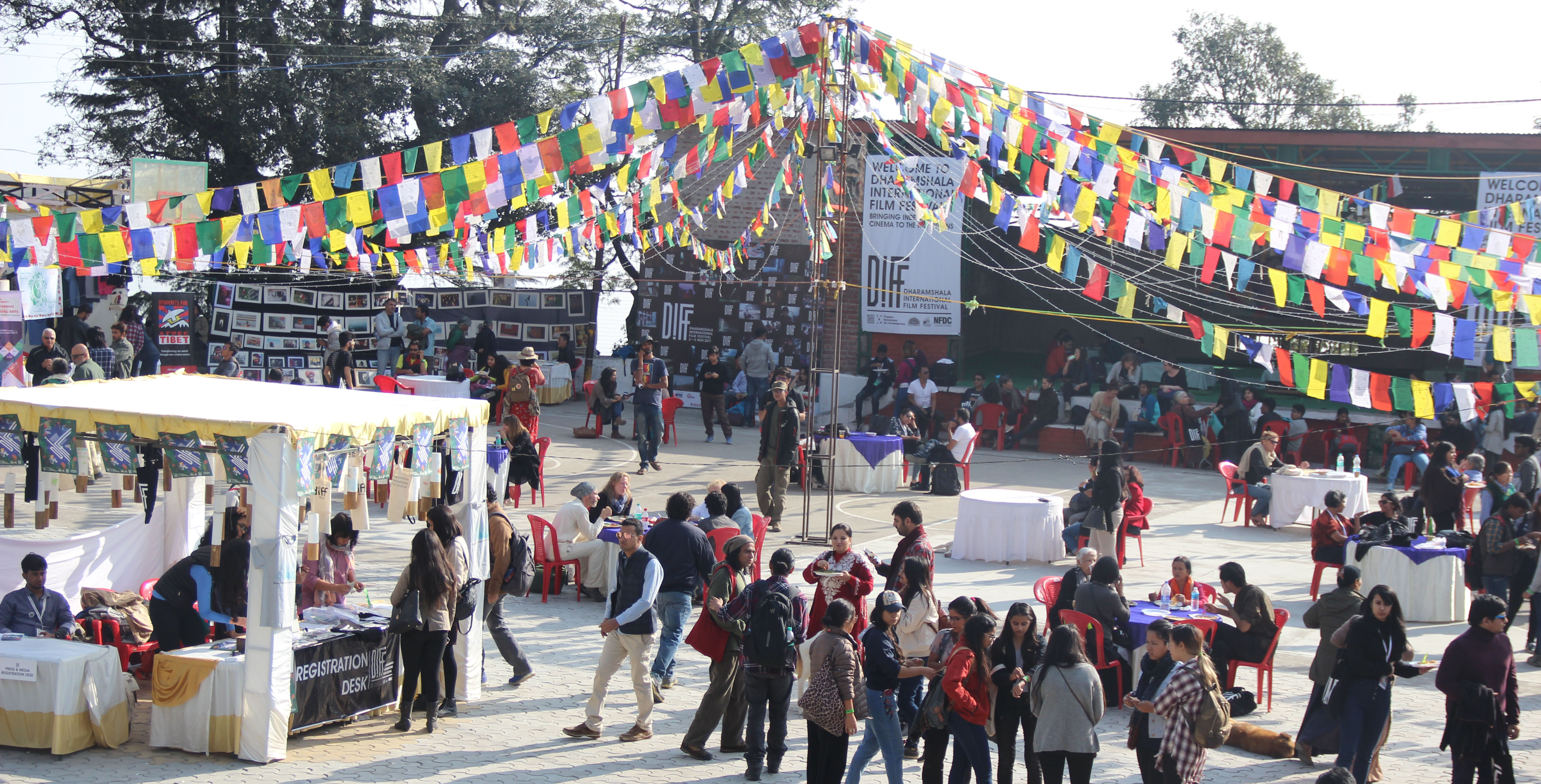
Dharamshala International Film Festival 2017 at the Tibetan Children's Village School.

The festival also features a range of Talks, Panels and Masterclasses by attending filmmakers and industry professionals. They have included Kazuhiro Soda, Asif Kapadia, Adil Hussain, Varun Grover, Anurag Kashyap, Jennifer Fox, Manoj Bajpayee, Naseeruddin Shah, Konkona Sensharma and Pa. Ranjith among others.

Selection of films are screened at other locations as well under the banner of DIFF On The Road.

Each year the festival runs a Volunteer Programme for young people from across India who work on the festival for a week.

== Covid-19 Response ==
As a response to the COVID-19 pandemic, DIFF initiated The Viewing Room in March 2020 using a platform provided by Shift72— a selection of the festival's alumni films available to audiences around the world every two weeks until July 2020. Some of the films include 5 Broken Cameras, With You, Without You, Tripoli Cancelled, Court, Placebo, Ee Ma Yau, Miss Lovely, Nabarun, and The Dossier.

The 9th edition of Dharamshala International Film Festival was held online from 29 October to 4 November 2020 and extended until 8 November 2020. The online edition featured Indian premieres of 76 Days, Notturno, Gaza Mon Amour, Welcome to Chechnya, Yalda, a Night for Forgiveness, Identifying Features, Martin Eden, Exile, Shell and Joint, A Rifle and a Bag, and Air Conditioner.

The Talks Programme as part of DIFF 2020 was kicked-off with a conversation with Dibakar Banerjee and followed by Chaitanya Tamhane and Asif Kapadia. Other panels included a discussion with South Asian filmmakers Mostafa Sarwar Farooki, Afia Nathaniel, Deepak Rauniyar, Geetu Mohandas, and Tashi Gyeltshen; a conversation about writing for the screen with Juhi Chaturvedi and Varun Grover; and a look at international funding with representatives from Hubert Bals Fund, Aide aux cinémas du monde, and Wold Cinema Fund.
