= Mister Lonely =

2007 film by Harmony Korine

- Theatrical release poster
- Directed by: Harmony Korine
- Written by: Harmony Korine; Avi Korine
- Produced by: Harmony Korine; Nadja Romain; Adam Bohling
- Starring: Diego Luna; Samantha Morton; Denis Lavant; Werner Herzog; James Fox; Anita Pallenberg
- Cinematography: Marcel Zyskind
- Edited by: Valdís Óskarsdóttir; Paul Zucker
- Music by: Jason "Spaceman" Pierce; Sun City Girls
- Production companies: Film4; Recorded Picture Company; Dreamachine; Agnès b. Arte France Cinéma
- Distributed by: IFC First Take (United States); Tartan Films (United Kingdom); Shellac Distribution (France)
- Release dates: May 22, 2007 (Cannes); March 14, 2008 (UK); April 30, 2008 (US); December 17, 2008 (France)
- Running time: 112 minutes
- Countries: United Kingdom; France; Ireland; United States
- Languages: English; French
- Budget: $8.2 million
- Box office: $407,674

Mister Lonely is a 2007 comedy drama film directed by Harmony Korine and co-written with his brother Avi Korine. It features an ensemble cast of international actors, including Diego Luna, Samantha Morton, Denis Lavant, Werner Herzog, James Fox, Anita Pallenberg and Leos Carax. The film follows a Michael Jackson look-alike joining a commune filled with other impersonators as they build a stage to attract people to see them perform. Mister Lonely garnered mixed reviews from critics and was a box-office bomb, grossing $407,674 against an $8.2 million budget.

== Plot ==
A young man living in Paris scratches out a living as a Michael Jackson look-alike, dancing on the streets, public parks, tourist spots and trade shows. He is an immigrant who does not speak French fluently and appears lonely and out of touch with the people around him. During a show in a home for the elderly, he meets a Marilyn Monroe impersonator. Haunted by her angelic beauty, he follows her to a commune in the Scottish Highlands, joining her husband Charlie Chaplin, and her daughter Shirley Temple. Here, the Pope, Elizabeth II, Madonna, James Dean, and other impersonators also live together and interact regularly whilst staying in character. Although peaceful at first, their sheep livestock become ill and they have put them down, greatly upsetting everyone. There are also signs that the husband, Charlie Chaplin, is abusive towards Marilyn. The group start building a stage in the hope that the world would visit and watch them perform. They act out a performance in front of a small audience but are disappointed by the low turnout. Later, when wandering out together in the woods, they discover that the Marilyn Monroe impersonator has hanged herself.

The Michael Jackson impersonator leaves the commune disillusioned and returns to his apartment from before in Paris. He begins talking to a row of eggs with the impersonator's face drawn on them, with Marilyn Monroe hoping that he can persevere and follow his own destiny. Sometime later, the Michael Jackson impersonator is seen without any makeup and out of character, walking around the streets of Paris where people are outside celebrating.

Throughout the movie, there is a subplot concerning a convent in what seems to be a developing country. One of the nuns survives a fall from an airplane during a mission to deliver food to villages and discovers that if you are true of heart, God will protect you. All the nuns then begin jumping from planes to show that they are true of heart and protected by God. However, at the end of the movie, after deciding to travel out again to attempt this, the corpses of the nuns and the wreckage of a plane are shown washed up at a beachfront.

== Cast ==
- Diego Luna as Michael Jackson
- Samantha Morton as Marilyn Monroe
- Denis Lavant as Charlie Chaplin
- Werner Herzog as Father Umbrillo
- James Fox as The Pope
- Anita Pallenberg as The Queen
- Melita Morgan as Madonna
- Jason Pennycooke as Sammy Davis Jr.
- Esmé Creed-Miles as Shirley Temple
- Leos Carax as Renard
- Britta Gartner as Nun
- Alisa Grace Greaves as Autograph girl
- Quentin Grosset as Le Petit Garçon
- Rachel Korine as Little Red Riding Hood
- Joseph Morgan as James Dean
- Richard Strange as Abraham Lincoln
- Daniel Rovai, Mal Whiteley, and Nigel Cooper as The Three Stooges: Moe Howard, Larry Fine, and Curly Howard
- Michael-Joel Stuart as Buckwheat
- David Blaine as Priest 2
- Angel Morgan as Various roles

== Development ==
Korine conceived of a film about impersonators as a way to explore what he called "the obsessive nature" of the impersonator personality. Rather than mocking or belittling impersonation, Korine claims to have felt a "fondness and empathy" for impersonators since childhood.

Korine came up with the idea for the film after the release of Julien Donkey-Boy, but his drug use and general disillusionment (along with fund-raising difficulties) prolonged the process. In a February 2007 interview with Screen International, he said: "I'd been making movies since I was virtually a kid, and it had always come very easily. At a certain point after the last movie, I started to have this general disconnect from things. I was really miserable with where I was. I began to lose sight of things and people started to become more and more distant. I was burnt out, movies were what I always loved in life and I started to not care. I went deeper and deeper into a dark place and to be honest movies were the last thing I was thinking about – I didn't know if I was going to be alive. My dream was to evaporate. I was unhealthy. Whatever happened during that time, and I won't go into the details, maybe it was something I needed to go through." In a 2003 interview with the New York Post, former girlfriend Chloë Sevigny revealed that the formerly straight edge Korine had become addicted to heroin and methadone while they were together, with Korine's substance abuse issues contributing to the end of their relationship.

Richard Strange, who plays Abraham Lincoln, claimed that Korine often changed scenes and lines as filming progressed.

== Production ==
While shooting the commune scenes, the cast and crew lived together in a Scottish castle (Duncraig Castle, Plockton), and many of the actors remained in their impersonated characters for all or part of the time they were off-camera. Actor Denis Lavant even bathed with his shoes on, as his impersonated character Charlie Chaplin was said to do.

To film the secondary storyline, Korine worked with real skydiving nuns from Spain, sometimes in temperatures of 48 °C (120 °F). Those scenes were filmed in Panama (as specified in the movie's credits).

== Soundtrack ==
Half of the music was written and performed by Sun City Girls, with the other half being created by Spiritualized frontman, Jason "Spaceman" Pierce.

1. "Michael's Opening" (dialogue)
2. Spank Rock – "Backyard Betty"
3. Jason Spaceman – "Blues 1"
4. Jason Spaceman – "Blues 2 (Intro)"
5. Sun City Girls – "3D Girls"
6. Jason Spaceman – "Panama 1"
7. Sun City Girls – "Spook"
8. Jason Spaceman – "Garden Walk"
9. Sun City Girls – "Steppe Spiritual"
10. Jason Spaceman – "Pope in the Bath"
11. Daniel Rovai – "Red River Valley"
12. "Nun's Prayer" (dialogue)
13. Sun City Girls – "Mr. Lonely Viola"
14. Sun City Girls – "Beryl Scepter"
15. "Red Riding Hood's Hangman" (dialogue)
16. Jason Spaceman – "Stooges Harmonica"
17. "Father Umbrillo's Broken Nation"
18. Jason Spaceman – "Musicbox Underwater"
19. Sun City Girls – "Circus Theme"
20. Sun City Girls – "Vine Street Piano"
21. Jason Spaceman – "Paris Beach"
22. Sun City Girls – "Farewell"
23. Angel Morgan – "Gold Dust"
24. Aphex Twin – "Btoum-Roumada"

The movie also features "13 Angels Standing Guard 'Round the Side of Your Bed" by A Silver Mt. Zion and Bobby Vinton's "Mr. Lonely" (after which the film is titled), though neither song is included on the soundtrack. The Maid Freed From the Gallows by John Jacob Niles. My Life by Iris Dement.

== Reception ==
Korine's largest film to date with a budget of $8.2 million, Mister Lonely earned $386,915 in its first nine months — $167,396 in the United States and $219,519 in other territories.

On the review aggregator website Rotten Tomatoes, 46% of 74 critics' reviews are positive, with an average rating of 5.3/10. The website's consensus reads: "Less biting or offensive than Korine's earlier works, this frustratingly dull film still maintains the director's trademark odd beauty." Metacritic, which uses a weighted average, assigned the film a score of 53 out of 100, based on 22 critics, indicating "mixed or average" reviews.

A.O. Scott of The New York Times praised Luna and Morton for performing "without cuteness or camp" in their roles and Korine's "richly colored, wide-frame compositions" throughout the film but gave note that the incoherent story will cause viewers to find his filmmaking style "frustratingly hermetic" and "morbidly preoccupied" with "expressive [power of] pictures than [in] conventional psychology." He concluded: "And yet 'Mister Lonely,' self-enclosed though it may be, nonetheless demonstrates that Mr. Korine, who showed his ability to shock and repel in earlier films, also has the power to touch, to unsettle and to charm. This is undoubtedly a small movie, but it's also more than that: it's a small, imperfect world." Marjorie Baumgarten of The Austin Chronicle called the movie "Korine's most accessible as a director", noting that it featured "stirring and unforgettable" characters and imagery that "go[es] from poignant to comic and back again" when following the impersonators and the nuns, concluding that: "What does it all mean? I'm not sure. But ye of little faith – in either God's abiding power or one's own self-image – seem destined to come crashing down." Paste contributor Alissa Wilkinson wrote: "Well-acted and at times funny, the imaginative premise dances around a great potential for profundity. Unfortunately, it succumbs to a spectacularly simplistic ending that will leave viewers empty and annoyed. Besotted with its own playfulness, Mister Lonely gives off the distinct impression that it was a lot more fun to make than it is to watch."

Jeremiah Kipp of Slant Magazine was initially positive during the film's "vaudevillian" opening for maintaining the "free-form narrative style" of Korine's previous efforts, but felt the Scottish Isle scenes came across like a continuous "parade of skits". He admitted that Korine was still "one of the most innovative and surprising new voices in American cinema", concluding that: "As a champion for the beautiful and the strange, I'll take bottom-shelf Korine over just about anything else currently playing in theaters." Carina Chocano of the Los Angeles Times commended Luna and Morton for being "enormously likable and engrossing" in their roles and the nuns' tale for having a "straightforward, realistic quality" to it, but felt the rest of the film lacked "emotional involvement" and "sustained attention" during the commune scenes, concluding that "while it's full of arresting, indelible images, 'Mr. Lonely' remains mostly on the level of abstraction. You get it but you don't always feel it." Roger Ebert of the Chicago Sun-Times wrote that: "Harmony Korine's 'Mister Lonely' is an odd, desperate film, lost in its own audacity, and yet there are passages of surreal beauty and preposterous invention that I have to admire. The film doesn't work, and indeed seems to have no clear idea of what its job is, and yet (sigh) there is the temptation to forgive its trespasses simply because it is utterly, if pointlessly, original."

== See also ==
- Buster's Bedroom (1990), independent German comedy film set in an isolated place with strange residents
