= Dreaming Lhasa =

- Film poster
- Directed by: Ritu Sarin and Tenzing Sonam
- Written by: Tenzing Sonam
- Produced by: Ritu Sarin
- Starring: Tenzin Chokyi Gyatso; Jampa Kalsang; Tenzin Jigme; Phuntsok Namgyal Dumkhang; Tsering Topgyal Phurpatsang; Tenzin Wangdrak
- Cinematography: Ranjan Palit
- Edited by: Paul Dosaj
- Music by: Andy Spence
- Distributed by: First Run Features
- Release date: 2005
- Running time: 90 minutes
- Countries: India; United Kingdom
- Languages: Tibetan; English

Dreaming Lhasa is a Tibetan-language film by veteran documentary filmmakers, Ritu Sarin and Tenzing Sonam, who have been making films about various aspects of Tibet under the banner of White Crane Films since 1990. Written by Tenzing, a first-generation Tibetan born and brought up in exile, Dreaming Lhasa is perhaps, the first Tibetan feature film to explore the state of exile and the issues of identity, culture and politics as they affect the Tibetan refugee community in India.

== Plot ==
Karma, a young Tibetan woman from New York City comes to Dharamshala, the exile headquarters of the Dalai Lama in India, in search of her roots. She is making a documentary film about former political prisoners who have escaped from Tibet. One of her interviewees is the recently arrived Dhondup. He reveals to her that his dying mother had made him promise to deliver an old charm box to an exile Tibetan named Loga, and appeals to her for help in locating the man.

Their enquiries reveal that Loga, a former CIA-trained resistance fighter, has been missing for the past fifteen years and is presumed to be dead. But is he really dead? As they set out to unravel the mysterious circumstances of his disappearance, Karma finds herself unwittingly attracted to Dhondup even as she is sucked into the vortex of his search, which takes them through the world of the exile Tibetan community in India and becomes a journey of self-discovery.

== Release ==
The film had its world premiere at the 2005 Toronto International Film Festival and has screened in over 30 film festivals worldwide, including the 2005 San Sebastian International Film Festival. Its US distributors, First Run Features, opened the film in New York, at the ImaginAsian Theatre, on 13 April 2007. The film had a limited theatrical release in the US, Switzerland and the Netherlands. The DVD was released in the US by First Run Features on 18 September 2007, and worldwide soon afterwards by White Crane Films.

== Production ==
In the absence of any kind of a film industry among the exile Tibetan community, the film was shot using a cast almost entirely made up of non-professionals. Only Jampa Kalsang, who plays Dhondup, had some prior acting experience. The rest of the cast was chosen through a casting call sent out on Tibet-related websites, and through an auditioning process in Dharamsala, India, where much of the film was shot. Tenzin Chokyi Gyatso, who plays Karma, normally works in a bank in suburban Washington DC, while Tenzin Jigme, the third main character in the film, is a real-life musician and a member of the popular Tibetan refugee rock band, JJI Exile Brothers. The technical crew consisted mainly of Indian professionals, while an enthusiastic bunch of Tibetans provided them with backup and support.

== Other information ==
Jeremy Thomas, the acclaimed British producer of The Last Emperor and other films directed by Bernardo Bertolucci, was the main Executive Producer of Dreaming Lhasa. Long-time Tibet supporter, Richard Gere, was also one of the film’s Executive Producers.

Andy Spence, the music composer, is a founder-member of the British pop group, New Young Pony Club.

The film was the first Super 16 to 35mm blow-up going the Digital Intermediate route in India. The post-production was mostly done at Prasad EFX in Mumbai.

== Reception ==
The New York Sun said that the film "remains a keenly felt and well-told story of nations and the individual people who form them, wherever they may actually live."
