= Brighton Rock =

Brighton Rock may refer to:

- Brighton Rock (novel), a 1938 novel by Graham Greene
  - Brighton Rock (play), a 1943 stage adaptation by Frank Harvey
  - Brighton Rock (1948 film), a 1948 film based on the novel, directed by John Boulting
  - Brighton Rock (musical), a 2004 musical by John Barry and Don Black, based on the novel
  - Brighton Rock (2010 film), a 2010 film based on the novel
- Brighton Rock (band), a Canadian glam metal band
- "Brighton Rock" (song), a 1974 song by Queen on the album Sheer Heart Attack
- Rock (confectionery), a candy often referred to by its place of origin, for instance "Blackpool rock" or "Brighton rock"

== See also ==
- New Brighton Rock, a 1984 rock concert staged in New Brighton, Merseyside, UK
