= Martin Phipps =

British composer

- Born: 1 August 1968 (age 58)
- Education: University of Manchester
- Occupations: Composer; Conductor
- Parent: Jack Phipps
- Website: coolmusicltd.com/composers/martin-phipps

Martin Phipps (born 1 August 1968) is a British composer who has worked on numerous film and television projects.

== Early life and education ==
He is the son of Sue Pears and Jack Phipps, an arts administrator who had previously founded a management agency, which acted for many leading musical figures (including Benjamin Britten, Phipps's godfather).

Phipps read drama at the University of Manchester.

== Career ==
Phipps enjoyed early critical success with Eureka Street, and went on to score the BBC period dramas North & South and The Virgin Queen, for which he was recognised with the Ivor Novello Award for Best Original Score.

Phipps scored Low Winter Sun for Channel 4, starring Mark Strong and Brian McCardie and Persuasion, the most recent ITV adaptation of Jane Austen's novel, as well as Grow Your Own, a feature for Warp Films. He also scored the BBC adaptation of Jane Austen's Sense and Sensibility, adapted by Andrew Davies. Phipps was then commissioned to score the BBC's Oliver Twist adaptation, for which he was recognised with the Ivor Novello Award 2008 for Best Television Soundtrack.

Phipps went on to score the Rowan Joffé-helmed drama, Hurndall for Talkback Thames followed by Wallander for Yellow Bird/Left Bank Pictures, starring Kenneth Branagh, for which he was recognised with the BAFTA Craft Award 2009 for Best Original TV Score. He then went on to write the music for the feature film Endgame, starring William Hurt, Derek Jacobi, Mark Strong, Jonny Lee Miller and Chiwetel Ejiofor, chronicling the breakdown of S. African apartheid, directed by Pete Travis. It was entered into competition at the Sundance Film Festival. He also scored Small Island for Ruby Films/BBC, winning the BAFTA Craft Award 2010 for Best Original Television Music. More recently, he completed the score for his first feature film, Brighton Rock and composed the music for the newest BBC adaptation of Great Expectations.

In 2005, Phipps wrote the score to the film Pierrepoint. Other credits include The Wife of Bath from the BBC's contemporary adaptation of the Canterbury Tales, and the contemporary drama Dirty Filthy Love. He also scored the British feature film, The Flying Scotsman, and The Line of Beauty.

Phipps scored the UK thriller feature Harry Brown for Cutting Edge/Marv Films, starring Michael Caine, as well as Rowan Joffé's feature adaptation of Graham Greene's Brighton Rock. Mike Diver described Phipps' score as "rich and sumptuous of tone and depth". He co-wrote the score with Emily Barker for the BBC drama The Shadow Line. Authored by Hugo Blick for the BBC, it was described by one critic as "a maddening, stylish experiment in doing something completely, admirably different with television". More recent credits include the first series of Peaky Blinders on BBC Two for which he was nominated for a BAFTA Craft Award and The Honourable Woman. His documentary work includes scoring the documentary Britain in a Day. More recently he composed the score of the film Woman in Gold in collaboration with Hans Zimmer.

Phipps composed the soundtrack for the 2016 miniseries War & Peace. Phipps said he "ended up coming onto the project early on", and that he was given room to "run with it... from the very beginning." The soundtrack was released on 13 May 2016. He also composed the theme to the same year's Victoria, as well as incidental music of the early episodes. The theme was sung by the Mediæval Bæbes.

Phipps also composed the soundtrack for season 3, season 4, season 5 and season 6 of The Crown.

== Filmography ==
=== Films ===
Year	Title	Director	Notes
2005	Pierrepoint	Adrian Shergold	
2006	The Flying Scotsman	Douglas Mackinnon	
2007	Grow Your Own	Richard Laxton	
2009	Endgame	Pete Travis	
2009	Harry Brown	Daniel Barber	Co-composed with Ruth Barrett, Pete Tong, Theo Green and Paul Rogers
2010	Brighton Rock	Rowan Joffé	
2014	X+Y	Morgan Matthews	
2014	The Keeping Room	Daniel Barber	
2015	Woman in Gold	Simon Curtis	Co-composed with Hans Zimmer
2019	The Aftermath	James Kent	
2022	The Princess	Ed Perkins	Documentary film
2022	The Railway Children Return	Morgan Matthews	Co-composed with Edward Farmer
2023	Napoleon	Ridley Scott	

=== Television ===
Year	Title	Studio	Notes
1996	The Adam and Joe Show	Channel 4	Title music composer
1999	Eureka Street	BBC Two	TV miniseries
2000	Shades	ITV	TV miniseries
2001	Bob & Rose	ITV	
2001	Nice Guy Eddie	BBC One	
2003	The Canterbury Tales	BBC One	
2004	New Tricks	BBC One	Composed for 6 episodes
2004	North & South	BBC One	
2006	The Virgin Queen	PBS	
2006	The Line of Beauty	BBC HD	
2007	Masterpiece	PBS	Episode: "The Ruby in the Smoke"
2007	Oliver Twist	BBC One	TV miniseries
2007	Persuasion	BBC One	TV film
2008	Sense and Sensibility	BBC One	
2008–2012	Wallander	BBC One	Co-composed with Vince Pope
2009	Whitechapel	ITV	
2011	The Shadow Line	BBC	Title music composed by Ruth Barrett
2011	Great Expectations	BBC One	Co-composed with Natalie Holt
2011–2016	Black Mirror	Channel 4 Netflix	Episodes: "The National Anthem" "Hated in the Nation"
2013	Peaky Blinders	BBC Two	Composed Series 1
2014	The Honourable Woman	BBC Two	
2016	War & Peace	BBC One	
2016	Victoria	ITV	Title music composer Main score by Ruth Barrett
2019–2023	The Crown	Netflix	Seasons 3-6; theme music composed by Hans Zimmer (succeeding Rupert Gregson-Williams and Lorne Balfe)
2021	Solos	Prime video	Composed for 7 episodes
2026	Steal	Prime video	Music by/Composer 6 episodes
