= Before I Go to Sleep (film) =

- British theatrical release poster
- Directed by: Rowan Joffé
- Written by: Rowan Joffé
- Based on: Before I Go to Sleep by S. J. Watson
- Produced by: Avi Lerner; Liza Marshall; Mark Gill; Matthew O'Toole; Ridley Scott
- Starring: Nicole Kidman; Mark Strong; Colin Firth; Anne-Marie Duff
- Cinematography: Ben Davis
- Edited by: Melanie Oliver
- Music by: Edward Shearmur
- Production companies: Studio Canal; Millennium Films; Scott Free Productions; Film i Väst
- Distributed by: Clarius Entertainment (United States); StudioCanal (United Kingdom); UGC Distribution (France); Svensk Filmindustri (Sweden)
- Release dates: 4 September 2014 (New Zealand); 5 September 2014 (United Kingdom)
- Running time: 92 minutes
- Countries: United Kingdom; United States; France; Sweden
- Language: English
- Budget: $22 million
- Box office: $15.1 million

Before I Go to Sleep is a 2014 mystery psychological thriller film written and directed by Rowan Joffé and based on the 2011 novel of the same name by S. J. Watson. An international co-production between the United Kingdom, the United States, France and Sweden, the film stars Nicole Kidman, Mark Strong, Colin Firth, and Anne-Marie Duff.

== Plot ==
Christine Lucas wakes up next to a man she does not know. The man explains that he is her husband, Ben, and that she suffered severe brain damage from a car accident fourteen years earlier, resulting in her having no memory of her life from her early twenties onwards.

Christine receives treatment from Dr. Mike Nasch, a neuropsychologist, who gives her a camera to record her thoughts and progress each day. He also calls her every morning to remind her to watch the video in the camera, but instructs her to keep the camera hidden from Ben. Nasch reveals that her memory loss occurred after she was attacked and left for dead near an airport hotel; they both surmise that Ben tells Christine it was due to a car accident to avoid upsetting her.

Over the course of her treatment, Christine faintly remembers a red-haired woman named Claire. Ben tells her that Claire was a friend who couldn't handle Christine's condition and ended contact with her. Later, Christine recalls that she has a son, Adam. She angrily confronts Ben over hiding their child, but he says Adam died of meningitis when he was eight. Christine also remembers the name Mike and believes it may be the name of her attacker, which she tells Nasch during an appointment. He hugs her to comfort her and almost kisses her, but she pulls back and then notices on his name badge that his first name is Mike. Christine flees. Nasch later tells Christine he is not able to treat her any more because he has developed feelings for her.

Christine learns that, several years after her attack, Ben had placed her in an assisted care facility and divorced her, then had a change of heart and brought her home to live with him. She also discovers that Claire had been trying to contact her at the care facility. Christine obtains Claire's phone number and meets her. Claire reveals that Christine had embarked on an affair prior to her attack, while Ben and Claire had a one-time sexual encounter following the attack owing to their shared grief at Christine's memory loss.

Claire gives Christine a letter written to her by Ben; he asked Claire to give it to Christine should she ever be well enough to read it. In the letter, Ben tells Christine that he loves her, but that he had to leave her for Adam's sake, as he had begun to be afraid of her. Christine shows Ben the videos she has made on the digital camera. However, Ben angrily accuses Christine of having an affair with Nasch, strikes her and storms out. Later by phone call, Claire informs Christine that Ben claims not to have seen Christine for several years. Christine describes the Ben she is living with and they realise he is not Ben. As she attempts to escape the house, "Ben" renders her unconscious.

The next morning, Christine again awakens with no memory but she finds the camera and sees her entry saying she loves "Ben" and wants to make a life with him. "Ben" calls Christine and tells her to pack for a trip that night. He then visits Nasch and tells him to stay away from Christine. That night, "Ben" takes her to a hotel close to where she had been found after the attack. He reveals that he is Mike, the man she had an affair with. Christine then remembers that Mike had wanted Christine to reveal their affair to Ben, but Christine refused and their argument culminated in Mike viciously attacking Christine, resulting in her amnesia. Mike deletes the videos on her camera and states that he is no longer interested in playing the part of Ben. He tells Christine that they shall live together or no one shall live. Another struggle ensues, but this time Christine manages to get away. She sets off the hotel fire alarm then flees, and is seen telling her story on the camera while waiting in an ambulance.

Christine wakes up in a hospital bed and is visited by Nasch, this time as a friend and not as her therapist. He assures her the man responsible for her condition has been arrested. He tells Christine that she has visitors and that he hopes the visit will provide the breakthrough they have been hoping for. The real Ben appears with Adam, who is alive. Christine's memories begin to return when she sees her son.

== Cast ==
- Nicole Kidman as Christine Lucas
- Colin Firth as Mike/Ben
- Mark Strong as Mike Nasch
- Anne-Marie Duff as Claire
- Dean-Charles Chapman as Adam
- Jing Lusi as Nurse Kate
- Rosie MacPherson as Emily
- Ben Crompton as warehouse caretaker
- Adam Levy as Ben Lucas
- Gabriel Strong as boy on bike
- Flynn MacArthur as boy in dream
- Hannah Blamires as mother in park
- Bern Collaço as doctor
- Chris Cowlin as police officer
- Laraine Dix as hospital patient
- Llewella Gideon as psychiatric nurse
- Kevin Hudson as man on bike
- Steve Munroe as warehouseman
- Nick Turner as Claire's friend

== Production ==
On 1 May 2011, Ridley Scott bought the film rights of the novel Before I Go to Sleep by S. J. Watson, and hired Rowan Joffé to direct and write the script. In February 2012 Nicole Kidman was in talks to join the film; later in May she joined to star as Christine. On 31 October 2012 Mark Strong also joined the cast of the film. According to The Hollywood Reporter on 16 November 2012, Kidman said she wanted Colin Firth to work with her again. They had already worked together in a drama, The Railway Man. On 6 February 2013, it was confirmed that Firth had joined the cast to lead with Kidman.

=== Filming ===
The film was shot in London and at Twickenham Studios.

== Release ==
The film was released in the United Kingdom on 5 September 2014 and released in the United States on 31 October 2014.

=== Home media ===
The film was released on DVD and Blu-ray on January 27, 2015.

=== Marketing ===
On 3 July 2014, the first UK trailer of the film was released by StudioCanal UK.

=== Critical reception ===
The film was met with generally mixed reviews from critics.On the review aggregator website Rotten Tomatoes, 36% of 118 critics' reviews are positive. The website's consensus reads: "If it doesn't completely avoid thriller clichés, Before I Go to Sleep still offers a stylish, fast-paced, and well-acted diversion."Metacritic, which uses a weighted average, assigned the film a score of 41 out of 100, based on 31 critics, indicating "mixed or average" reviews. Audiences polled by CinemaScore gave the film an average grade of "C+" on an A+ to F scale.

It has been unfavorably compared with Memento, a film released 14 years earlier. "What the brilliant Memento once used as a way to explore a truly inventive way of storytelling is here just a gimmick. It's shallow, it's silly, it's pat. It's... forgettable," wrote the New Jersey Star-Ledger. "Christopher Nolan's 2000 brain-twister Memento starred Guy Pearce as a man with a similar malady. The earlier film rigorously stuck within the logical confines of its premise. Joffé's is filled with far too many contradictions and implausible situations," wrote The Philadelphia Inquirer.

Kidman's performance has been positively received. Writing for Daily Star, critic Andy Lea said in a positive review that "Kidman puts in a chilling performance as the frail but determined Christine." David Edwards of Daily Mirror stated, "Leading lady Nicole Kidman hasn't been this good in ages" finishing with "Kidman is on top form as the nervy, spiky woman walking a psychological tightrope."

== See also ==
- The Red Squirrel (La ardilla roja), a 1993 Spanish film directed by Julio Medem
- Clean Slate, a 1994 film directed by Mick Jackson
- Memento, a 2000 film directed by Christopher Nolan
- 50 First Dates, a 2004 film directed by Peter Segal
- Mithya, a 2008 Indian film directed by Rajat Kapoor
