= Melanie Oliver =

New Zealand film editor

- Born: Melanie Ann Oliver; New Zealand
- Occupation: Film editor
- Years active: 1990–present

Melanie Ann Oliver is a New Zealand film editor. She is best known for her works in the films Anna Karenina (2012), Les Misérables (2012), The Danish Girl (2015) and Victoria & Abdul (2017).

Oliver won a British Academy Television Craft Award for editing the successful television film Longford (2006), as well as being twice nominated for a Primetime Emmy Award for editing part two of the miniseries Elizabeth I (2005) and episode "Independence" of the miniseries John Adams (2008).

== Career ==
Oliver was raised in New Zealand, where she completed a university degree in advertising and marketing. Her career in film began as an assistant editor under the tutelage of screenwriter/director Jane Campion on Campion's films An Angel at My Table (1990) and The Portrait of a Lady (1996). She relocated to England where she worked as an assistant editor at a documentary production company and began to edit her own short films. In 1997 she was hired by Joe Wright to edit Crocodile Snap, a short film he was directing for the BBC; Oliver credits this experience as her breakthrough. She then transitioned from working in film to television, eventually editing Tom Hooper's miniseries Elizabeth I (2005), for which she received an Emmy Award nomination, and Hooper's telefilm Longford (2006), which earned her a BAFTA Award for Best Editing in TV Fiction/Entertainment. In 2008 she collaborated with Hooper again on the miniseries John Adams; her editing was nominated for an American Cinema Editors Eddie Award and another Emmy.

Oliver returned to film editing in the mid-to-late 2000s, with Brick Lane (2007), The Damned United (2009), Creation (2009), and Jane Eyre (2011). In 2012 she reunited with Joe Wright to edit his film adaptation of Anna Karenina. The same year, she co-edited Hooper's adaptation of Les Misérables with Chris Dickens, who began editing as it was filmed while Oliver was more involved in editing during post-production to ensure that the film's music was perfectly synchronised with the images. Oliver and Dickens' work on Les Misérables received numerous accolades, including nominations for a Critics' Choice Movie Award for Best Editing, an Eddie Award for Best Edited Feature Comedy or Musical Film, and a Satellite Award for Best Editing. She later edited Pride (2014) and Before I Go to Sleep (2014). In 2015, she rejoined Hooper to edit his biographical film The Danish Girl.

== Selected filmography ==
The director of each film is indicated in parentheses.

- A Mulatto Song (Topher Campbell-1996)
- Crocodile Snap (Joe Wright-1997)
- Renegade TV Gets Dazed (?-1998)
- The End (Joe Wright-1998)
- Blood and Money (Joanna Bailey-2001)
- Puff Daddy: Keeping It Real (Bruce Goodison-2001)
- Dirty War (Daniel Percival-2004)
- Faith (David Thacker-2005)
- Longford (Tom Hooper-2006)
- Celebration (John Crowley-2007)
- Mansfield Park (Iain B. MacDonald-2007)
- Brick Lane (Sarah Gavron-2007)
- The Damned United (Tom Hooper-2009)
- Creation (Jon Amiel-2009)
- The Special Relationship (Richard Loncraine-2010)
- Jane Eyre (Cary Joji Fukunaga-2011)
- Anna Karenina (Joe Wright-2012)
- Les Misérables (Tom Hooper-2012)
- Pride (Matthew Warchus-2014)
- Before I Go to Sleep (Rowan Joffe-2014)
- The Danish Girl (Tom Hooper-2015)
- Bridget Jones's Baby (Sharon Maguire-2016)
- Victoria & Abdul (Stephen Frears-2017)
- Mary Magdalene (Garth Davis-2018)
- Judy (Rupert Goold-2019)
- Cats (Tom Hooper-2019)
- The Last Letter from Your Lover (Augustine Frizzell-2021)
- Matilda the Musical (Matthew Warchus-2022)
- Wicked Little Letters (Thea Sharrock-2023)
- Moana (Thomas Kail-2026)
