= Second Life (disambiguation) =

Second Life is an online virtual community.

Second Life may also refer to:

== Music ==
- "Second Life", a 2013 song by Kitty
- "Second Life", a 2019 song by Seventeen from the album An Ode
- "Second Life", a 2010 song by Zach Hill from the album Face Tat

== Other uses ==
- Second Life (film), a 2009 Portuguese film
- Second Life (TV series), a 2015 television series
- Second Life (novel), a 2015 novel by S. J. Watson

== See also ==
- Extra Life (disambiguation)
