= Sam Riley =

British actor (born 1980)

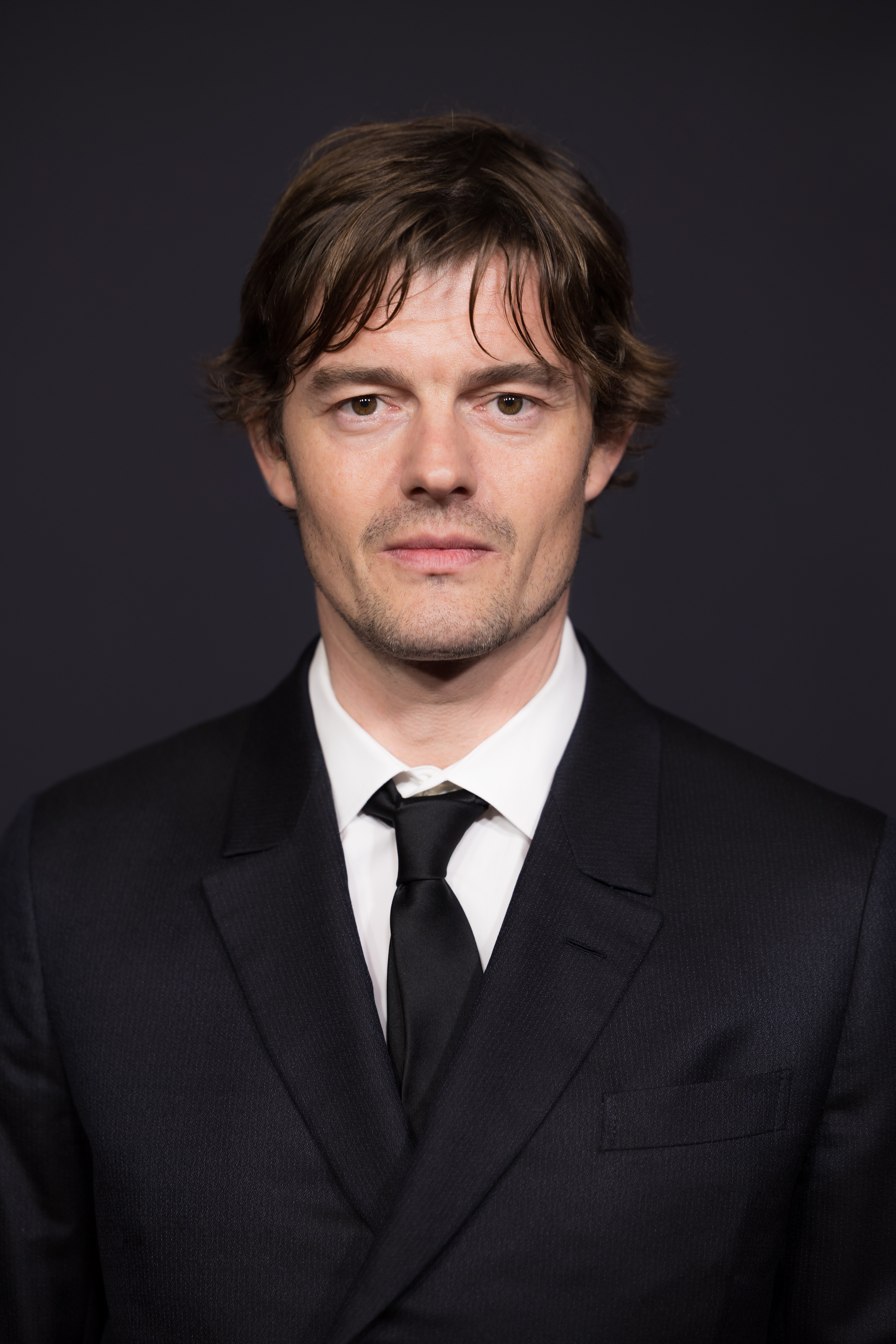
- Riley in 2024
- Born: 8 January 1980 (age 46); Menston, Bradford, West Yorkshire, England
- Occupations: Actor; singer
- Years active: 2002–present
- Spouse: Alexandra Maria Lara (m. 2009)
- Children: 1

Samuel Peter W. Riley (born 8 January 1980) is an English actor and singer. He is best known for his performance in the 2007 biographical film Control about the life of Ian Curtis, as protagonist Sal Paradise in the 2012 adaptation of the Jack Kerouac novel On the Road, and as Diaval in the 2014 film Maleficent. Riley received renown for his portrayal of Fitzwilliam Darcy in the 2016 film Pride and Prejudice and Zombies.

== Early life and education ==
Riley was born in Menston, Leeds, West Yorkshire, the son of Amanda, a nursery school teacher, and Andrew Riley, a textile agent. He was educated at Malsis School, an independent school in the village of Cross Hills in North Yorkshire, and at Uppingham School, an independent school in the market town of Uppingham in Rutland.

== Career ==
=== Acting ===
His breakthrough performance came when he played the role of Ian Curtis in the film Control, a biopic about the lead singer of the 1970s post-punk band Joy Division. The film received high critical acclaim due in good part to Riley's performance, which won him a selection of awards including the British Independent Film Award for "Most Promising Newcomer" a BAFTA "Rising Star" nomination; and a Mark Kermode nod for Best Actor 2007.

Prior to his portrayal of Ian Curtis, Riley played The Fall frontman Mark E. Smith in the Michael Winterbottom film 24 Hour Party People, which details the Factory Records era and featured Sean Harris as Ian Curtis. Riley's scenes, however, were omitted from the final cut.

In September 2007, Riley was cast in Gerald McMorrow's British science fiction film Franklyn. He starred as the lead role in 13, an English language remake of the French thriller 13 Tzameti, released in the U.S. 28 October 2011. He played the role of Pinkie Brown in Brighton Rock alongside Helen Mirren, an adaption of Graham Greene's novel, released 4 February 2011. He also starred in Walter Salles' film adaptation of Jack Kerouac's autobiographical On the Road playing the narrator and protagonist Sal Paradise. He also has a small role in the 2011 German comedy Woman in Love, in which his wife Alexandra Maria Lara plays the female lead. His role is listed as "Wagenmeister".

In Byzantium (2012), a film directed by Neil Jordan, he appears alongside Gemma Arterton and Saoirse Ronan as Darvell.

In 2012, Riley was cast as Diaval in Disney's Maleficent, alongside Angelina Jolie. The film was released May 2014.

In 2015, he played Benoit Labarie in Saul Dibb's film adaptation of Irène Némirovsky's novel Suite Française, opposite Michelle Williams, Matthias Schoenaerts, Kristin Scott Thomas and Ruth Wilson.

Riley was also cast as Fitzwilliam Darcy (Mr. Darcy) in the film, Pride and Prejudice and Zombies, released in February 2016.

Riley played the 'not-so welcome' returning prodigal brother David in the 2018 film Happy New Year, Colin Burstead by Ben Wheatley.

=== Modelling ===
He featured in the autumn/winter 2008 publicity campaign for the British fashion house Burberry, supervised by Christopher Bailey and shot by Mario Testino. He modelled the fall/winter 2014 Stefano Pilati-designed couture collection of Ermenegildo Zegna. He was named one of GQ's 50 best dressed British men in 2015.

=== Music ===
For a few years Riley was the lead singer of the Leeds band 10,000 Things, with whom he achieved moderate success. After their first release on indie label Voltage Records in 2002, they signed to major label Polydor for one self-titled album. They disbanded in 2005.

== Personal life ==
As of 2011, Riley lives in Berlin with his wife, Romanian-German actress Alexandra Maria Lara. They met while filming Control, married in August 2009 and have a son born in January 2014.

== Filmography ==
=== Film ===
Year	Title	Role	Notes
2007	Control	Ian Curtis	Bratislava International Film Festival Award for Best Actor; British Independent Film Award for Most Promising Newcomer; Chicago International Film Festival Award for Best Actor; Edinburgh International Film Festival Award for Best British Performance; Empire Award for Best Newcomer; Kermode Award for Best Actor; International Cinephile Society Award for Best Actor; London Film Critics Circle Award for British Breakthrough of the Year – Acting; Nominated – BAFTA Awards – Rising Star Award; Nominated – British Independent Film Award for Best Actor; Nominated – Evening Standard British Film Award for Best Actor; Nominated – London Film Critics Circle Award for British Actor of the Year; Nominated – Online Film Critics Society Award for Breakthrough Performer
2008	Franklyn	Milo	
2010	13	Vincent Ferro	
2010	Brighton Rock	Pinkie Brown	Nominated – Evening Standard British Film Award for Best Actor
2012	On the Road	Sal Paradise	
2012	Byzantium	Darvell	
2014	The Dark Valley	Greider	
2014	Maleficent	Diaval	
2015	Suite Française	Benoit Labarie	
2016	Pride and Prejudice and Zombies	Fitzwilliam Darcy	
2016	Free Fire	Stevo	
2018	Happy New Year, Colin Burstead	David	
2018	Sometimes Always Never	Peter	
2019	Radioactive	Pierre Curie	
2019	Maleficent: Mistress of Evil	Diaval	
2020	Rebecca	Jack Favell	
2021	The Vault	James	
2022	She Is Love	Idris	
2023	Firebrand	Thomas Seymour	
2023	Widow Clicquot	Louis Bohne	
2025	Islands	Tom	Premiered at 75th Berlin International Film Festival in Berlinale Special in February 2025.
2025	Bulk	Corey	

=== Television ===
Year	Title	Role	Notes
2007	Law & Order: Special Victims Unit	Uni Bruny	1 episode
2016	Tinkershrimp & Dutch	Michael the Fowl	5 episodes
2017	SS-GB	Douglas Archer	5 episodes
2026	Mint	Dylan	8 episodes
2026	Black Doves	Patrick	5 episodes
2026	Where's Wanda?	George	4 episodes
TBA	Berlin Noir	Robert Lanz	Upcoming series
