= Dashkevich =

Dashkevich (Belarusian: Дашкевіч, Polish: Daszkiewicz, Ukrainian: Дашкевич/Dashkevych) is a family name of Belarusian or Polish origin. It may refer to one of the following people:

- Zmitser Dashkevich, a Belarusian politician
- Ostap Dashkevych, a hetman of Ukraine
- Vladimir Dashkevich, a Russian composer
- Tracy Daszkiewicz, a public health official in Wiltshire, England
