= ABC Cinema, Brighton =

Former cinema in Brighton, England

ABC Cinema
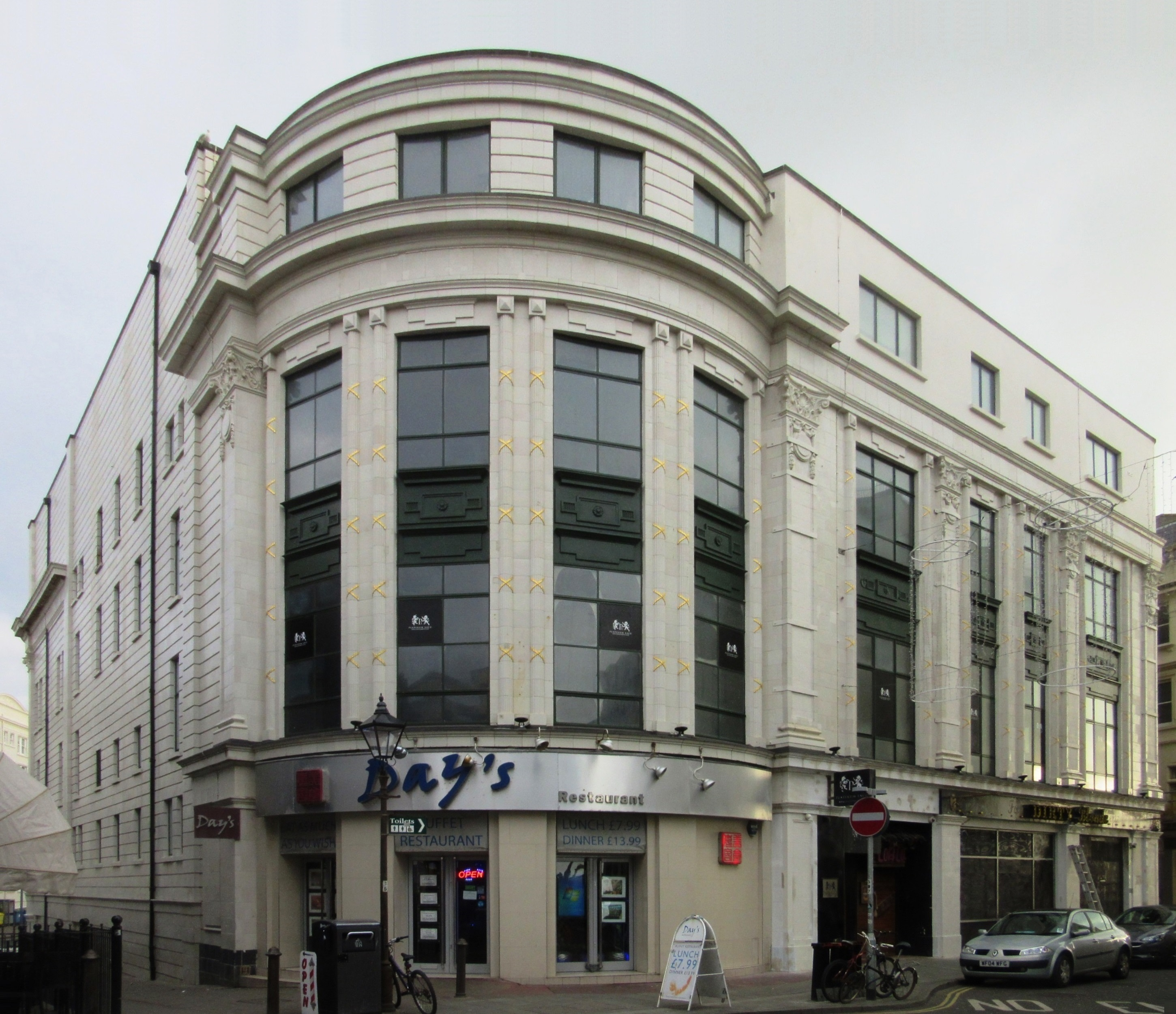
- East Street façade of the former cinema in December 2016

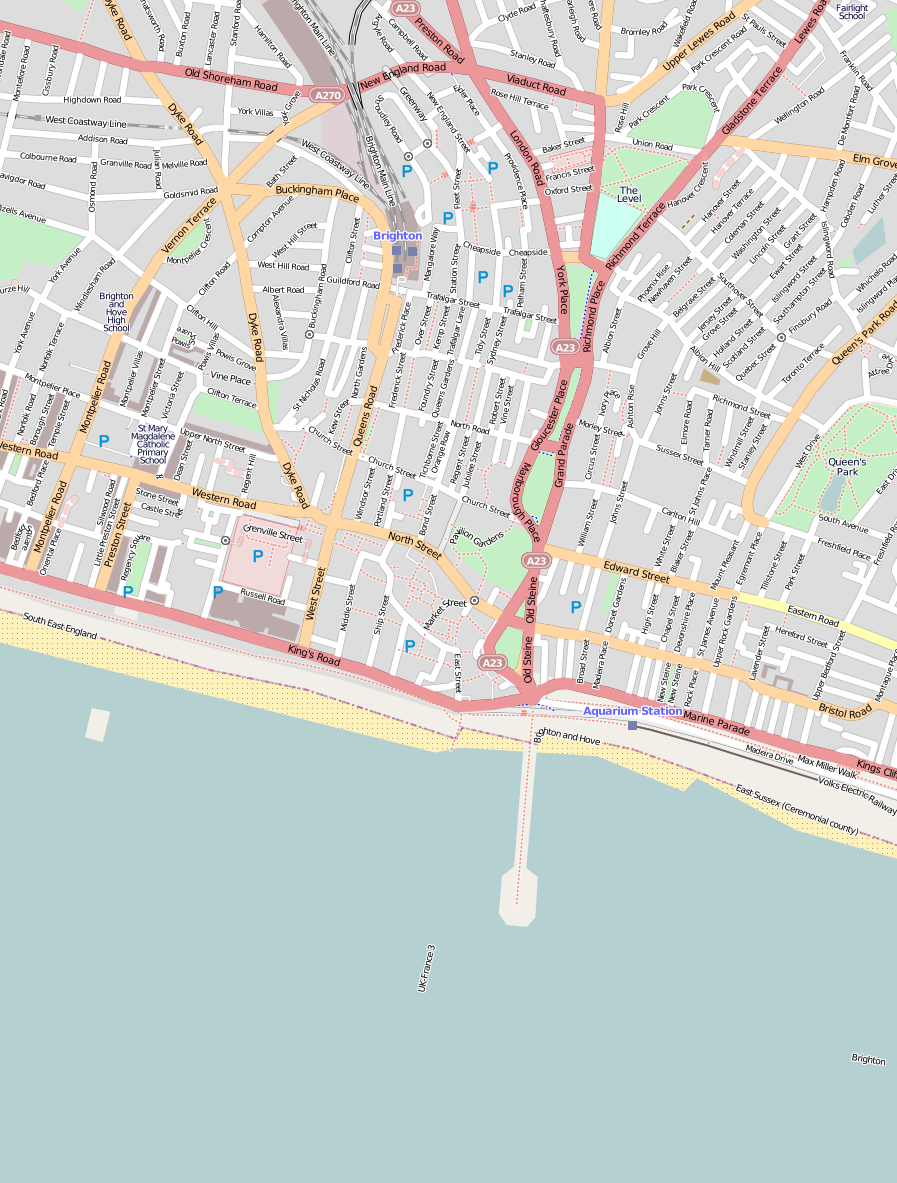
- Location within Brighton
- Former names: Savoy Cinema Theatre
- Location: 75 East Street, Brighton BN1 1NP, United Kingdom
- Coordinates: 50°49′12″N 0°08′19″W
- Owner: ABC Cinemas
- Capacity: 2,567
- Current use: Casino and bar
- Parking: 300 vehicles (underground)

Construction
- Built: 1930
- Opened: 1 August 1930
- Closed: 28 January 2000
- Cost: £250,000
- Architect: William R. Glen

The ABC Cinema (originally the Savoy Cinema Theatre) is a former cinema in Brighton, part of the English seaside city of Brighton and Hove. It also operated under the Cannon and Virgin brands briefly in the 1980s and 1990s. It was built in 1930, initially for Savoy Cinemas; but when that group became part of the new Associated British Cinemas (ABC) circuit later that year, it was redesigned by ABC's own architect William R. Glen and became the group's first major cinema. It was also the second-largest ABC ever built, and the largest cinema in Brighton based on seating capacity. Prominently sited, with a tall, curving entrance façade on East Street in The Lanes and another entrance on the Grand Junction Road facing the seafront and Palace Pier, it was one of Brighton's most important cinemas for much of the 20th century and was chosen as the venue for the world premiere of Brighton Rock in 1948. After closure in January 2000 the building was split up; part is now a casino, another section is a bar, and a restaurant formerly occupied another section. The building is on Brighton and Hove City Council's local list of heritage assets.

== History ==
The site on which the cinema was built, between Grand Junction Road, Pool Valley and the bottom of East Street, was previously occupied by Brill's Baths, a proprietary public bath-house. Such establishments were very popular in Brighton in the 18th and 19th centuries as an alternative to bathing in the sea. Built in 1823 by a Mr Lamprell, it was taken over by his nephew Charles Brill, who commissioned George Gilbert Scott to rebuild and extend it in 1869. Bathing establishments became less popular in the 20th century, and the building was bought by a developer and demolished in 1929.

The popularity of the Regent Cinema, which had opened in 1921, encouraged the development of rival cinemas. In 1929, shortly after the Regent had been extensively damaged by fire (leading to a temporary closure) and a scheme for a "super-cinema" on West Street had fallen through, the Brill's Baths site was acquired by Savoy Cinemas with the intention of building a cinema which would "match the Regent in splendour and scale". The group's in-house architect F.C. Mitchell designed it. Shortly afterwards, though, the newly created Associated British Cinemas (ABC) group acquired Savoy Cinemas and reconfigured the new cinema as an early flagship venue. It was redesigned by William R. Glen, the group's own architect, and a wide range of facilities were incorporated: two restaurants (one of which was also used as a ballroom), two cafés which overlooked the seafront, a Western Electric sound system, and an underground car park with a capacity of 300. £250,000 was spent on the scheme. The opulent Oriental-style interior was designed by Charles Muggeridge and was loosely inspired by the interior of the nearby Royal Pavilion.

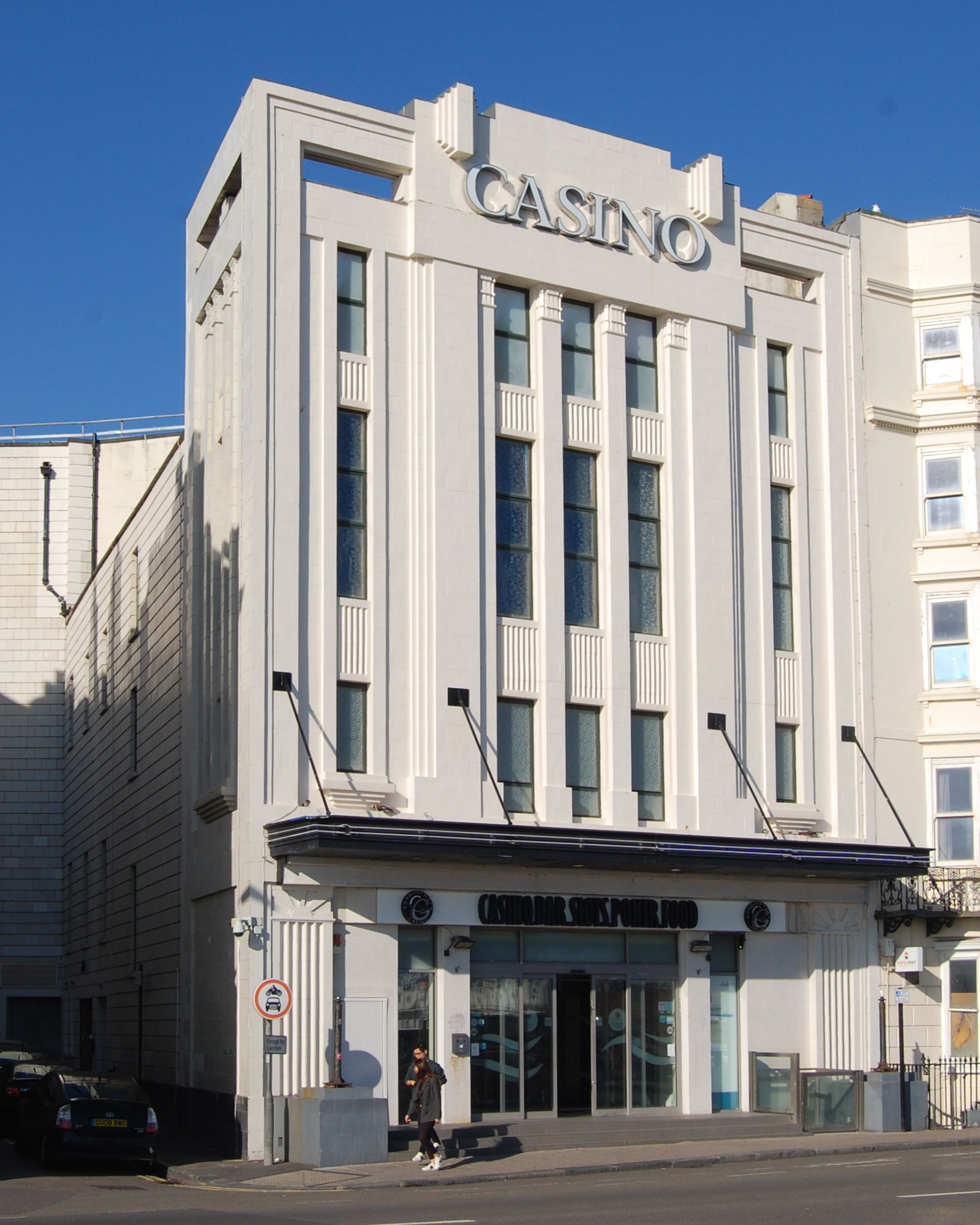
The building also has an entrance on Grand Junction Road – now the main entrance to the casino which occupies most of it.

The cinema opened on 1 August 1930, still under the Savoy brand (and known as the Savoy Cinema Theatre), showing new releases Loose Ends and Not So Quiet on the Western Front. Films typically received a one-week run and were changed on Fridays, although major hits such as All Quiet on the Western Front and King of Jazz were shown for longer. Films were also screened later than in any other Brighton cinema: throughout the 1930s there was an 11:45 pm showing, aimed at employees of Brighton railway works who came off shift late. During the Second World War Brighton Blitz, on 29 November 1940 an incendiary bomb hit the cinema, coming through the roof and landing in the auditorium, where it failed to explode.

After the war, the cinema gained a 24-hour licence, and was chosen as the venue for the world premiere of Brighton Rock, which was filmed locally. It took place at midnight on 8 January 1948, and many cast members attended. After this, it ran for two weeks. The Savoy name was dropped with effect from 26 April 1961 and the cinema was rebranded ABC, although the ABC group's triangular logo had already been mounted on the East Street façade several years before this. A scheme to replace the south (seafront-facing) entrance on Grand Junction Road with a mixed-use building of shops and flats was proposed in 1967 but was not followed through.

Decline set in during the 1970s, as was the case at other cinemas in Brighton. In November 1975, the auditorium, whose original seating capacity of 2,300 had later been expanded to 2,567 (1,059 at balcony level and 1,508 in the stalls), was subdivided to create four separate cinemas known as ABC 1, 2, 3 and 4. Much of the opulent interior decoration was stripped away as well. It reopened in April 1976. At this time it shared the first pick of films with the Odeon, which had opened in 1937 on West Street originally as part of the ABC group's "B circuit" (showing less popular films). It had reopened in new, larger premises in 1973 and was now, along with the ABC, one of Brighton's main cinemas following the demise of the Regent in 1973, closely followed by the closure of another Brighton "super-cinema", the Astoria Theatre, in 1977. ABC 1, the new main auditorium seated 820 and occupied most of the balcony; ABC 2 had a capacity of 346 and was situated where the front stalls had been; and ABC 3 (284 seats) and 4 (241 seats) were in the former rear stalls. After the ABC circuit was acquired by the Cannon Group in 1986, the cinema was rebranded with the Cannon name with effect from 18 December that year. Together with the Odeon, the cinema hosted Brighton's first film festival in 1987.

In 1990 it was stated that the Cannon Group was due to open an eight-screen multiplex at Brighton Marina in early 1991, "leaving the older cinema's future in some doubt". This cinema opened under the MGM Cinemas brand, but it was still owned by the wider Cannon group. The Cannon was put on the market in April 1991, but no buyer was found and it was still attracting reasonable audiences, so by 1994 (when tickets for most screenings were offered at a reduced rate) it was withdrawn from sale. The seating capacity was reduced to 810 at this time with the closure of ABC 1 and a reordering of the other three auditoria. Virgin Cinemas then bought the Cannon/MGM group and briefly rebranded the cinema before selling it in June 1996 to a newly formed ABC Cinemas company (unrelated to its predecessor). It stayed open until 28 January 2000.

The building was then subdivided, with the southern section and the upper floor sold to Grosvenor Casinos (accessed through the seafront-facing entrance on Grand Junction Road) and the northern (East Street) part initially becoming a pub, the Toad at the Picture House. Both sections had all of their interior decoration removed during the alterations. In 2007 the former pub was no longer in use, but by 2011 a buffet restaurant called Day's was operating there. This was closed by Brighton and Hove City Council in 2018 because of non-payment of business rates. By 2015 another part of the building was in use as a bar called Dirty Blondes.

The cinema can be seen in the background of some scenes in the 1979 film Quadrophenia.

== Architecture ==
The former cinema is Art Deco in style, albeit a freely interpreted version of it. The East Street (north) and the Grand Junction Road (south) elevations are treated differently: the latter is "strongly vertical", "opulent and streamlined", while that facing East Street is curved, with long fasces-style pilaster-like features and elements of Classical and, in the capitals, Egyptian architecture. All sides of the building are clad in white faience tiles by Shaw's Glazed Brick Company of nearby Lewes, which earned the cinema the nickname of "the white whale", and more than one million locally produced white bricks make up the walls. Although much larger than the surrounding buildings, especially on the small-scale East Street, it "provide[s] an interesting transition to the seafront". Despite the internal alterations, it is also significant for being the last of Brighton's super-cinemas to survive: the Regent and the Astoria have been demolished.

The south entrance was originally the main one. There are three sets of windows above the entrance canopy, in a 1–3–1 formation with tall pilasters separating the central group and rising to a frieze. Above this is a parapet. The entrance itself is flanked by fluted columns. The tall windows on the East Street elevation are also separated by pilasters.

Brighton and Hove City Council added the building to its local list of heritage assets in 2015, describing it as "a good example of 1930s Art Deco Cinema frontages" and "one of few surviving cinema buildings in the city", especially of its era; and noting that the façades are little altered and that glazed terracotta tiles are uncommon, particularly in this part of Brighton (thereby forming a contrast to many of the buildings in the conservation area in which it is situated).

== Bibliography ==
- Antram, Nicholas; Morrice, Richard (2008). Brighton and Hove. Pevsner Architectural Guides. London: Yale University Press. ISBN 978-0-300-12661-7.
- Antram, Nicholas; Pevsner, Nikolaus (2013). Sussex: East with Brighton and Hove. The Buildings of England. London: Yale University Press. ISBN 978-0-300-18473-0.
- Brighton Polytechnic. School of Architecture and Interior Design (1987). A Guide to the Buildings of Brighton. Macclesfield: McMillan Martin. ISBN 1-869865-03-0.
- Carder, Timothy (1990). The Encyclopaedia of Brighton. Lewes: East Sussex County Libraries. ISBN 0-86147-315-9.
- Eyles, Allen (2003). Brighton and Hove Cinemas. Images of England. Stroud: Tempus Publishing. ISBN 0-7524-3069-6.
- Gilbert, Edmund M. (1975) [1954]. Brighton: Old Ocean's Bauble. Hassocks: Flare Books. ISBN 0-901759-39-2.
