= Franklyn =

- Theatrical release poster
- Directed by: Gerald McMorrow
- Written by: Gerald McMorrow
- Produced by: Jeremy Thomas
- Starring: Eva Green; Ryan Phillippe; Sam Riley
- Cinematography: Ben Davis
- Edited by: Peter Christelis
- Music by: Joby Talbot
- Production companies: Recorded Picture Company; Film4; UK Film Council; HanWay Films
- Distributed by: eOne
- Release dates: 16 October 2008 (LFF); 27 February 2009 (United Kingdom)
- Running time: 95 minutes
- Country: United Kingdom
- Language: English
- Budget: £6 million

Franklyn is a 2008 British science fantasy film written and directed by Gerald McMorrow as his debut feature. The film stars Eva Green, Ryan Phillippe, and Sam Riley.

Franklyn had its world premiere at BFI London Film Festival on 16 October 2008, and was released in the United Kingdom on 27 February 2009, by eOne.

== Plot ==
In a comic book-like world, Jonathan Preest is the masked vigilante of Meanwhile City, where everyone is legally enforced to adopt a religion. Preest, the only atheist in town, learns that his nemesis, The Individual, has kidnapped a girl. While looking for her, he is captured by the local authorities. Promising to eventually release him, they bring Preest to an operating room to implant a homing device on him. Before they can do that, Preest fights his way out of the building.

In a reality like our own, Emilia is a troubled art student living in London. During one of her arts projects, she records herself calling an ambulance and taking a deadly amount of pills. The ambulance arrives in time to save her, and she wakes up in a hospital.

In that same building, Peter, a religious man, looks for his son David, who has become mentally unstable after returning from the war in Iraq. He has been reported to be at that hospital before fleeing.

After learning that the kidnapped girl has been killed by the Individual, Preest visits Wormsnake, his usual informant, and attacks him. Pretending he wants to arrange a meeting to talk things out, Preest gives Wormsnake a note with an address and tells him to give it to the Individual. He then hides in the building in front of the one referenced in the note and, holding a sniper rifle, awaits the Individual.

Another one of Emilia's projects is secretly following and recording strangers, occasionally disguising herself with a red wig. One of the strangers is named Milo, and his fiancée left him days before the wedding. Heartbroken, Milo starts believing an old childhood friend, a redhead named Sally, is everywhere he goes. He eventually talks to Sally, who looks a lot like Emilia, and arranges a date at a restaurant. Milo later learns from his mother that Sally is imaginary; a character he constructed as a child while dealing with the death of his father. He nonetheless goes to the restaurant the night of the date.

At a shelter for the homeless, Peter meets Bill, an old acquaintance of David from his time in Basra. David recently attacked Bill and gave him a note with an address. Bill, who looks a lot like Wormsnake, fears David will kill him.

After a conversation with the hospital's janitor and another botched suicide attempt, Emilia decides to confront her mother. It turns out that, as a child, Emilia was abused by her father and told her mother about it. For her entire life, Emilia has thought that her mother did not believe her. Her mother reveals that she did believe Emilia, and that is why they left her father. The two women reconcile.

Peter goes to the address in Bill's note, which turns out to be the building where Emilia lives. Baffled, he decides to go to the restaurant in front of the building, the same where Milo is "dating" Sally.

David, who looks a lot like Preest, breaks into Emilia's apartment, hits her and uses her window to aim a rifle at his father in the restaurant below. The Meanwhile City reality is actually a fantasy constructed by David after the trauma of both the war and losing his sister at a young age. When she died, Peter told David that her death was part of God's plan, in an attempt to reassure him. Peter's attitude had the opposite effect on David, who has resented his father ever since. Believing himself to be a hero, he shoots at the exact moment that Milo stands up to "kiss" Sally. The bullet ends up hitting Milo and makes everyone around him panic. Meanwhile, in yet another suicide attempt, Emilia turns on the gas heater. Realizing what he has actually done, David commits suicide by igniting the gas, causing an explosion that destroys the apartment. Emilia, who was running out of the apartment, survives. Leaving the building, she is spotted by Milo. As the paramedics arrive on the scene, Milo and Emilia meet.

== Cast ==
- Eva Green in a dual role as Emilia and Sally. Emilia is a damaged student who films her would-be suicide attempts as installations for her art degree. Eva Green has compared her to real people, Sophie Calle and Tracey Emin and described Sally as "full of life, very witty, big sense of humor."
- Ryan Phillippe as Jonathan Preest, a masked vigilante detective from Meanwhile City. Preest is the only atheist in town.
  - Luke Pettican as young Jonathan Preest
- Sam Riley as Milo Franklyn, a young man who has just been jilted at the altar. Riley was cast based on his performance as Ian Curtis in the 2007 film Control.
- Bernard Hill as Peter Esser, a Cambridge church warden looking for his wayward son in London.
- James Faulkner as Pastor Bone
- Art Malik as Tarrant, the head of Meanwhile, City's Ministry
- Vauxhall Jermaine as Leon
- Susannah York as Margaret
- Richard Coyle as Dan
- Kika Markham as Naomi
- Stephen Walters as Wormsnakes/Wasnik

== Production ==
Writer-director Gerald McMorrow wrote the original science fiction script Franklyn as his feature debut. It depicts a similar dystopia to his 2002 short Thespian X. In October 2006, actor Ewan McGregor was cast as the lead in the film, which was slated to begin production in summer 2007. However, McGregor broke his leg in a biking accident in February 2007 during the second series of Long Way Round and was forced to leave the project. Actors Eva Green, Ryan Phillippe, and newcomer Sam Riley were cast in Franklyn in September 2007. Phillippe was the last to be cast in what McMorrow termed a 'now or never' situation, saying of their first meeting: "You have preconceptions about people... You expect the bleach-blond Californian kid and what you got was an incredibly erudite, brought-up-the-wrong-side-of-the-tracks Philadelphia actor. When I met him we did not stop talking all afternoon."

McMorrow's visual inspiration for Meanwhile City came from the religious iconography he saw in Mexico City shopping malls. He later explained: "The idea was that if you're going to have a capital city based on religion, you've got somewhere like Florence or Rome and send somewhere like that three miles into the sky... Part of Preest's delirium and fantasies are based on the religion surrounding him and comics he read and films he saw. He sort of pieces together a jigsaw of his own delusions." Preest's mask was primarily influenced by Claude Rains' film of H. G. Wells' novel The Invisible Man. Preest also bears a resemblance to the character Rorschach in Watchmen, not only in terms of clothing but in terms of character.

Franklyn had a budget of £6 million, of which £1 million was provided by the UK Film Council through its Premiere Fund. Production began on 24 September 2007 in and around London, and was completed by December 2007. Major locations included an East End bar and Greenwich Naval College, where many of the CGI sequences were shot. McMorrow described his approach, "I used an atypical and off-kilter background, and told a story that wouldn't normally be told. The film was set around some tricky locations but we managed to shoot it." The film entered post-production by April 2008.

== Reception ==
Franklyn opened to mixed reviews, receiving a 57% Fresh rating on Rotten Tomatoes. Rights to Franklyn were purchased from sales and financier HanWay Films by Contender Films for the United Kingdom, and Seville Pictures for Canada, with both distributors operating under their parent company Entertainment One. Franklyn premiered at the 52nd London Film Festival on 16 October 2008. The film was released theatrically in the United Kingdom on 27 February 2009.

Dave Calhoun of Time Out opined: "Produced by British industry veteran Jeremy Thomas, McMorrow’s admirable if not entirely coherent debut follows the lives of four people in and around London who are attempting to cope with various crises in their lives, from a relationship break-up and the search for a missing son to the psychological after-effects of military service. The film treads a fine line between realism and fantasy, occasionally dipping out of the world as we know it to visit a seductively strange vision of the capital that appears part-futuristic and part-medieval (and which gives the film its name). Riley follows Control by leaning heavily on middle-distance stares and up-turned collars, while Green is a troubled art student with a good line in haute couture, and Philippe is a troubled ex-soldier. The main problem is that by the time this tricksy film finally plays its hand, many viewers may already have been lost at the wayside."

Derek Elley of Variety thought the premise better suited to a novella rather than a feature film, believing that Franklyn lacked an emotional payoff. Elley criticized the script for not developing the ideas it introduced and for lacking background on the characters. The critic also considered Phillippe and Riley to be poor casting in their roles, while Green could not present her dual roles dramatically. Jason Solomons of The Observer reviewed the film, "The visual style is impressive but the storylines are thin and the characters all extremely irritating." Fionnuala Halligan of Screen International weighed in: "It's unusual in the current film-making climate to see an independent director making such an ambitious debut as Gerald McMorrow's Franklyn. He aims high, visually and conceptually, but a more experienced director would have trouble finding the right tone to pull this intricate plot off. Notices should be at least encouraging: McMorrow has pulled off a very handsome look on a limited budget."
