= Bath Fringe Festival =

Annual art festival in Bath, England

- Dates: May–June
- Location: Bath, Somerset
- Years active: Since 1981
- Website: Festival website

The Bath Fringe Festival is an annual art festival, held in Bath, England.

Bath Fringe was founded in 1981 as a counterbalance to the 'classical'-dominated Bath Music Festival, which some people perceived to be elitist and out-of-touch with what a younger local audience wanted. In many ways the Bath Fringe was a direct descendant of the Walcot Festivals of the 1970s and 1980s, which had included elements of theatre, pop festival, ‘happening’, eco-activism and local creativity, supported by Bath Arts Workshop.

The festival is among the oldest continually operating in England, and includes around 200 events, taking place around the late May Bank Holiday, running for 17 days at the end of May and beginning of June.

== Organisation ==
After the initial 1981 fringe festival, it became smaller until by 1991-2 it hosted fewer than a dozen events. A new group, a cooperative of local artists, promoters, venue managers and audience members revitalised the festival during the 1990s. Bath Fringe tends to try to create other organisations to run specific events or strands, so has variously given birth to:

- FAB (Fringe Arts Bath) - the visual arts part of the festival
- Walcot Independence Day — a large and popular outdoor party with much local creativity. Discontinued
- Streats — street, outdoor, site-specific, installations, performances in unusual spaces, who run the annual Bedlam Fair street festival, financed through the Fringe. Part of the Independent Street Arts Network.
- Little Fiets – green-powered and activist events like ‘The Wheel Thing’.
- 20:20 Vision - An immersive, new writing mini-festival created by Fake Escape that has run in conjunction with Bath Fringe since 2013

== Character ==
Many of the people working on events, and the committee that sets it all up, are volunteers, although it does have 2 part-time workers. In common with many Fringe Festivals all round the world most of the programme consists of people presenting their own events in their own venue or one hired for the duration – Bath Fringe does however run a core programme of street/outdoor/tented events itself and it maintains an Open Access policy, not imposing artistic constraints on work that participants put on themselves. The major tasks of the organisation revolve around the production of a print programme and website, and facilitating others to put on or include events. The relative financial independence of any individual sponsor or venue is maintained although funding was received from the local Bath and North East Somerset council and Arts Council England.

== Bath Fringe in history ==
The southwest holds some of Britain’s major greenfield festivals - Glastonbury, WoMaD, Big Green Gathering and others are all held within 50 miles of Bath – and the city had an important place in the development of British Pop Festivals and Free Festivals — its popular Festival credentials go back to the pioneering Bath Festival of Blues and Progressive Music. Many of the people working at the festival (technicians, facilities) also work at the big events, and there is some crossover of performers too. Bath Fringe sits in the ‘Festival Scene’ tradition as much as in the development of Fringe Theatre, although the Walcot Festival emphasis on outdoor performance and ‘guerilla’ events put it as a pioneer in the development of what are currently called ‘Street Arts’.

== See also ==
Fringe Theatre
