= Second Life (novel) =

2015 novel by S. J. Watson

- First edition
- Author: S. J. Watson
- Cover artist: Mark Owen / Trevillion and Shutterstock
- Language: English
- Genre: Thriller, suspense
- Publisher: Doubleday (UK); HarperCollins (US)
- Publication date: 12 February 2015(UK)
- Publication place: United Kingdom
- Media type: Print, audio & ebook
- Pages: 425
- ISBN: 978-0-857-52020-3

Second Life is the second novel of S. J. Watson, published in February 2015.

== Plot ==
Second Life is the story of Julia, who has a perfect life with her husband Hugh and their adopted son, until an incident changes everything. Her sister Kate is murdered in an apparently random attack in Paris and the police seems to be stuck in their investigations. Julia decides to inquire into the murder on her own and finds out that her sister was using online sites to meet up with strangers in order play out her sexual fantasies. Julia starts visiting some of these sites herself in hope of finding someone connected to Kate.

== Reception ==
Writing for The Independent, Simmy Richman gave the book a mixed review, stating that while the book was not a bad thriller, it seemed like it was being written with the idea of a film adaptation in mind first, and contains a number of continuity errors and implausible plot points. They ultimately summarized the book as being "simply efficient". Mark Lawson, writing for The Guardian, similarly gave it a mixed review, describing it as a disappointing follow up to Watson's first book, Before I Go to Sleep. He also criticized the seeming attempt to attract the fanbase of books like Fifty Shades of Grey, though ultimately stated that the book was gripping and suspenseful enough to suggest that Watson's third book might be better. In a review for The Observer, Alison Flood was more positive, stating that there were a number of things that Watson did extremely well. However, they criticized the ending as being "bizarre and unsatisfying".

== Film adaptation ==
The film rights for the novel were acquired in May 2015 by Reese Witherspoon's production company, Pacific Standard.
