= Brighton Rock (play) =

Brighton Rock is a 1943 British play by Frank Harvey that ran for a hundred performances at the Garrick Theatre in the West End. Richard Attenborough and Dulcie Gray starred in the original theatrical production, and there had previously been one-week try-outs at the Grand Theatre, Blackpool and Bristol Hippodrome.

Inspired by the 1938 novel of the same name by Graham Greene, the play portrays the downfall of an ambitious young criminal in Brighton. Gray's performance as the luckless waitress Rose led to her being offered a contract with Gainsborough Pictures. However, she was passed over for the role of Rose in the 1947 film version of Brighton Rock, in favour of Carol Marsh. Others in the cast included William Hartnell, Norman Pierce, Harcourt Williams and Hermione Baddeley, several of whom reprised their roles in the 1948 film adaptation.

== Bibliography ==
- Wearing, J.P. The London Stage 1940-1949: A Calendar of Productions, Performers, and Personnel. Rowman & Littlefield, 2014.
