= Extra Life =

An extra life is a video game item that fully or partially restores a defeated character so the player can resume or retry the part of the game which knocked that character out.

Extra Life may also refer to:

- Extra Life (fundraiser), a fundraising event
- Extra Life (band), an experimental band from Brooklyn
- Extra Lives: Why Video Games Matter, a book by Tom Bissell
- Extra Lives, a game by indie game developer MDickie

== See also ==
- Second Life (disambiguation)
