= Sanctuary (2012 film) =

2012 Irish-Polish film

- Theatrical film poster
- Directed by: Norah McGettigan
- Written by: Norah McGettigan; Gabriel Enrique Vargas
- Produced by: Andrew Freedman; Katarzyna Slesicka
- Starring: Jan Frycz; Anne-Marie Duff
- Cinematography: Marius Matzow Gulbrandsen
- Edited by: Mariusz Kus
- Release dates: July 13, 2012 (Galway); October 26, 2012 (Poland)
- Running time: 90 mins.
- Countries: Ireland; Poland
- Languages: English; Polish

Sanctuary is a 2012 Irish-Polish drama film, directed by Norah McGettigan, who co-wrote it with Gabriel Enrique Vargas. It stars Jan Frycz and Anne-Marie Duff. It premiered at the Galway Film Fleadh in 2012, then subsequently released in Poland later that same year.

== Synopsis ==
Irish-made road-movie set in the African Sahara, telling the story of Isobel and her transvestite friend Deecy as they travel in the region, trying to find Isobel's brother who has been abducted.

== Cast ==
- Jan Frycz as Jan Kuczynski
- Anne-Marie Duff as Maire Kuczynski
- Agnieszka Żulewska as Nadia Kuczynska
- Fiona Browne as Dr. Caroline Franke
- David Fennelly as Billy
- Stella McCusker as Mrs. Lawlor
- Agnieszka Mandat as Housemaid

== Reception ==
Agnieszka Le Nart of Culture.pl praised the film and lauded the filmmaker, stating it "effortlessly evokes the twin perils of heartbreak and hope that inevitably follow great loss. At once personal and profound, art-house yet everyday, Norah McGettigan has crafted an elegiac, challenging yet beautiful film that belies her status as a first-time film maker."

Patryk Czekaj of Letterboxd rated the film 2/5 stars, opining it is "an overly-melancholic, dry, and emotionally-disconnected meditation on life and death. Quality-wise it’s like an episode of a basic Polish TV drama."
