= Faculty of Public Health =

- Formation: 1972
- Location(s): London, NW1; United Kingdom
- Members: 4000
- President: Professor Kevin Fenton
- Website: www.fph.org.uk

The Faculty of Public Health (FPH) is a public health association in the United Kingdom established as a registered charity. It is the standard setting body for public health specialists within the United Kingdom, setting standards for training, examination, and specialist practice across the four countries of the UK. It is also a source of knowledge and guidance around public health, and advocates for public health nationally and globally.

The current president is Tracy Daszkiewicz, who took office in July 2025 for a three-year term.

== History ==
The Faculty of Public Health (formerly the Faculty of Community Medicine and then the Faculty of Public Health Medicine) was formed in 1972 as a result of a key recommendation of the Royal Commission on Medical Education (1965–68). It was set up as a joint, autonomous faculty by the three Royal Colleges of Physicians of the United Kingdom (London, Edinburgh and Glasgow).

== Mission ==
FPH states its mission as:

As the professional membership body for public health we will work to promote and protect human health and its wider determinants for everyone in society by:

- Playing a leading role in assuring an effective public health workforce.
- Promoting public health knowledge.
- Advocating for the reduction of inequalities and for the very best conditions for health and wellbeing to flourish.

== Membership ==
FPH has a paid membership of around 4,000 in several classes:

- Fellows (FFPH) (formerly FFPHM)
- Members (MFPH)
- Specialty Registrar Members
- Diplomate Members (DFPH)
- International Practitioner
- Practitioner Members
- Associate Members
- Student Members

== Training ==
The Faculty of Public Health (FPH) is responsible for overseeing the quality of training and professional development of public health consultants in the UK. They set and maintain the professional standards in the discipline.

== Advocacy ==
The Faculty of Public Health works to improve the public's health and wellbeing by working collaboratively with their 4,000 members to encourage them to share, discuss, and develop various projects and elements of policy and best practice.

Much of the Faculty's policy work is guided by their Special Interest Groups that are overseen by their policy committees.

== Affiliations ==
FPH is a registered charity and an official supporting organisation of HIFA2015 (Healthcare Information For All by 2015).

FPH is a member of the Academy of Medical Royal Colleges

FPH is a member of the World Federation of Public Health Associations.

== Prizes and awards ==
FPH has a number of prizes and awards which identify and highlight excellence in public health practice.

=== Alwyn Smith Prize ===
The Alwyn Smith Prize is a discretionary prize awarded annually "to the FPH member or fellow judged to have made the most outstanding contribution to the health of the public by either research or practice in community medicine (public health medicine)."

=== Bazalgette Professorship ===
The Bazalgette Professorship recognises a Fellow of FPH for major contributions to public health policy and/or practice through research translation for the benefit of UK population health.
