= The Salisbury Poisonings =

2020 British television series

- Genre: Crime drama
- Written by: Adam Patterson; Declan Lawn
- Directed by: Saul Dibb
- Starring: Anne-Marie Duff; Rafe Spall; MyAnna Buring; Mark Addy; Annabel Scholey; Darren Boyd; Nigel Lindsay; Clare Burt; Ron Cook; Stella Gonet; Andrew Brooke; William Houston; Jonathan Slinger; Johnny Harris
- Music by: Rael Jones
- Country of origin: United Kingdom
- Original language: English
- No. of series: 1
- No. of episodes: 3 (as first shown)

Production
- Producer: Karen Lewis
- Running time: 55 minutes
- Production company: Dancing Ledge Productions

Original release
- Network: BBC One
- Release: 14 June – 16 June 2020

The Salisbury Poisonings is a fact-based drama television series, starring Anne-Marie Duff, Rafe Spall and Annabel Scholey which portrays the 2018 Novichok poisonings and decontamination crisis in Salisbury, England, and the subsequent Amesbury poisonings. The series was broadcast in three parts on BBC One in June 2020, and has been shown in four parts elsewhere. It was created by Adam Patterson and Declan Lawn for Dancing Ledge Productions.

== Synopsis ==
On 4 March 2018, emergency services receive a call to attend to Sergei and Yulia Skripal who have been found unconscious on a park bench in Salisbury city centre. Medical practitioners are initially puzzled by their illness, and police and the local public health department become involved. A national emergency is precipitated when it is learned that Skripal is a former Russian military intelligence officer who acted as a double agent for the UK's intelligence services during the 1990s and early 2000s. It emerges that he and his daughter were poisoned with a highly potent Novichok agent which was smeared on the front-door handle of their residence. The docudrama also deals with the incidental exposure of several other persons, including a police officer and an uninvolved couple who found a perfume bottle containing the nerve agent which they administered to themselves. At the end of the series, the real-life people involved in the story are pictured returning to the scene, and some film is shown of Dawn Sturgess, the only person to die from their exposure to the Novichok.

== Cast ==
- Anne-Marie Duff as Tracy Daszkiewicz
- William Houston as Ted Daszkiewicz
- Rafe Spall as DS Nick Bailey
- Annabel Scholey as Sarah Bailey
- Darren Boyd as Supt Dave Minty
- Nigel Lindsay as DCC Paul Mills
- Amber Agar as DI Lata Mishra
- Wayne Swann as Sergei Skripal
- Jill Winternitz as Yulia Skripal
- Johnny Harris as Charlie Rowley
- Barry Aird as Matthew Rowley
- MyAnna Buring as Dawn Sturgess
- Stella Gonet as Caroline Sturgess
- Melanie Gutteridge as Claire Sturgess
- Ron Cook as Stan Sturgess
- Mark Addy as Ross Cassidy
- Clare Burt as Mo Cassidy
- Duncan Pow as Dr. James Haslam
- Emma Stansfield as Nurse Emma Black
- Shereen Martin as Dr. Rebecca Jenner
- Jonathan Slinger as Prof. Tim Atkins
- Andrew Brooke as Alistair Cunningham
- Chris Wilson as Police Officer
- Kimberley Nixon as Hannah Mitchell
- Michael Shaeffer as Stephen Kemp
- Remy Beasley as Georgia
- Sophia Ally as Gracie Sturgess
- Judah Cousin as Toby Daszkiewicz
- Stephanie Gil as Ellie Bailey
- Kiera Thompson as Annie Bailey
- Mark Horton as Craig

== Episodes ==
No.	Title	Directed by	Written by	Original release date	UK viewers (millions)
1	"Episode 1"	Saul Dibb	Adam Patterson & Declan Lawn	14 June 2020	11.65
The Skripals and DS Bailey fight to survive, whilst the director of public health in Wiltshire, Tracy Daszkiewicz, and the emergency services try to locate the source of the nerve agent to prevent further casualties.
2	"Episode 2"	Saul Dibb	Adam Patterson & Declan Lawn	15 June 2020	10.77
CID officer Nick Bailey’s condition worsens as Tracy struggles to protect local residents against the numerous deposits of Novichok being found across the city.
3	"Episode 3"	Saul Dibb	Adam Patterson & Declan Lawn	16 June 2020	10.39
Several months later, the city is starting to forget and heal—until a scavenged perfume bottle leads to tragic consequences for local couple Dawn and Charlie.

== Reception ==
Writing in The Guardian, Lucy Mangan praised the show's script and direction as being "admirably restrained", and compared the calm actions of its characters facing a "new normal" to the reactions of the public during the COVID-19 pandemic.

== Release and distribution ==
Worldwide distribution is handled by Fremantle. In June 2020 it was announced that AMC signed an agreement with Fremantle to exclusively broadcast the show in the United States. The AMC broadcast is slated to premiere 25 January 2021.

The series was shown over four nights on SBS TV in Australia from 24 August 2020.

In December 2021 the series was re-released on Netflix and Disney Plus.

== See also ==
- Poisoning of Sergei and Yulia Skripal
