= Brighton Rock (2010 film) =

2010 film by Rowan Joffé based on the 1938 novel

- Theatrical release poster
- Directed by: Rowan Joffé
- Screenplay by: Rowan Joffé
- Based on: Brighton Rock by Graham Greene
- Produced by: Paul Webster
- Starring: Sam Riley; Andrea Riseborough; Andy Serkis; John Hurt; Sean Harris; Helen Mirren
- Cinematography: John Mathieson
- Edited by: Joe Walker
- Music by: Martin Phipps
- Production companies: StudioCanal Features; Optimum Releasing; UK Film Council; BBC Films; Kudos Film and Television
- Distributed by: Optimum Releasing
- Release dates: 13 September 2010 (TIFF); 4 February 2011 (United Kingdom)
- Running time: 111 minutes
- Country: United Kingdom
- Language: English
- Budget: $12 million
- Box office: $1.8 million

Brighton Rock is a 2010 British crime film written and directed by Rowan Joffé and loosely based on Graham Greene's 1938 novel of the same name. The film stars Sam Riley, Andrea Riseborough, Andy Serkis, John Hurt, Sean Harris and Helen Mirren.

The novel had previously been made into a film under the same title by the Boulting brothers that premiered in 1948. Although the novel and original film are both set in the 1930s, the 21st-century adaptation is set during the Mods and Rockers era of the 1960s.

Sam Riley plays "Pinkie", the role originally played by Richard Attenborough. Filming began in October 2009. It was largely filmed in the nearby town of Eastbourne, with Eastbourne Pier standing in for Brighton Pier, and at Beachy Head. Some scenes were shot at Hedsor House in Buckinghamshire and in Brighton itself.

== Plot ==
In 1964, Pinkie Brown, the sociopathic enforcer of a Brighton gang, murders Fred Hale, who had killed the gang leader Kite. Brown befriends Rose, a young waitress who witnessed the gang's activity, to keep an eye on her. She falls in love with him. He marries her to prevent her from being compelled to provide evidence against him. Ida, Rose's employer and a friend of Hale's, takes it upon herself to save the girl from the monster she has married.

== Cast ==
- Sam Riley as Pinkie Brown
- Andrea Riseborough as Rose
- Andy Serkis as Mr Colleoni
- John Hurt as Phil Corkery
- Helen Mirren as Ida
- Sean Harris as Hale
- Phil Davis as Spicer
- Nonso Anozie as Dallow
- Craig Parkinson as Cubitt
- Steve Evets as Mr Wilson
- Maurice Roëves as Chief Inspector

== Production ==
Rowan Joffé was originally uninterested in the project, which as first proposed was to be a remake of the 1948 film. After re-reading the novel, however, Joffé "fell absolutely in love with the character of Rose" and convinced the studio to let him adapt the novel directly. Joffe later explained why he did his own adaptation of the novel:

The novel was worthy of a contemporary adaptation. In fact, it makes it almost more dutiful as a filmmaker if you love the novel, to bring it to life without the restriction of censorship. I mean, a lot of the Catholicism was cut out of the original film because they didn’t want to offend Catholics... there are aspects of the film where if critics were to be honest about, and few of them have been certainly in England, that the 1947 version is a rather tame adaptation and certainly fails to do justice to the character of Rose because the original black and white was made in a period where we were culturally and politically very patronizing to women.

Apropos of the location, Pinkie kills Spicer by shoving a stick of Brighton rock candy down his throat.

== Release ==
Brighton Rock premiered at the Toronto International Film Festival in September 2010 and the BFI London Film Festival in October 2010.

The film was released theatrically in the United Kingdom on 4 February 2011, and in Australia on 14 April 2011. In the United States, IFC Films released the film in August 2011, theatrically in New York City and Los Angeles, and elsewhere via video-on-demand.

== Reception ==
Brighton Rock received mixed reviews from critics. Review aggregator Rotten Tomatoes reports that 51% of 96 critics gave the film a positive review, for an average rating of 5.7/10. The site's critics consensus reads: "Brighton Rock is a lean noir boasting an appealing trio of stars, but its old-fashioned presentation only reinforces how little it distinguishes itself from the superior original." Metacritic, which assigns a weighted average score from 1 to 100 to reviews from mainstream critics, gave the film a 57 based on 24 reviews indicating "mixed or average reviews". Stephen Holden wrote in The New York Times, "Mr. Joffé has turned Brighton Rock into a full-scale film noir with the stylistic undertow of a more modern British gangster movie. As potentially lethal as the thugs may be, they are also slightly over-the-hill small-time bookies who seem anything but invincible, and the movie gives each a complicated personality. Andy Serkis is outstanding as the oily Colleoni, a smirking sybarite and crime lord with playboy airs." Holden noted "Mr. Riley, now 31, is a little too old to play a teenage gangster, and it throws the movie off somewhat. If Pinkie's recklessly impulsive behavior is that of a frightened teenager, Mr. Riley's slick hair, facial scar and cold, wide-eyed stare suggest a seasoned smoothie who has watched a lot more dirty water slosh under the bridge than any teenager could have witnessed." Nevertheless, Holden concluded "By discarding most of the theological debate [found in the book], the movie is no longer a passion play but a gritty and despairing noir. That’s good enough for me." Philip Kemp of Sight and Sound criticized the film's ending, writing, "It’s a major miscalculation – and makes ultimate nonsense of Joffe’s claim not to be remaking the 1947 film."
