= Final Cut (novel) =

2020 novel by S. J. Watson

- First edition
- Author: S. J. Watson
- Language: English
- Publisher: Doubleday
- Publication date: 6 Aug 2020
- Publication place: United Kingdom
- Media type: Print
- Pages: 416

Final Cut is the third novel by the English author S. J. Watson, published in August 2020 by Transworld Publishers under their imprint Doubleday.

== Location ==
In an interview for Crime Fiction Lover, Watson reveals that "I've always loved books in which the setting feels very particular, and almost like a character in itself... I think it's a case of using the real place as a leaping off point – taking from it the things that are evocative and that lend the work the tone you're looking for, while also bending it to my own fictional needs. Robin Hood's Bay had exactly the atmosphere I wanted, but I didn't want to set the book there as I needed to take liberties with the setting and the characters."

== Plot ==
Documentary filmmaker Alex travels to Blackwood Bay, a quaint former smugglers' Yorkshire village set on a rugged coast. Her task is ostensibly to chronicle the inhabitants but she has a hidden agenda to investigate the disappearance of three teenage girls. A website has been set up inviting the villagers to submit videos themselves, for Alex to moderate. Alex herself suffers from fugue state and cannot recall her childhood but remembers that she lived in Blackwood Bay as a child. The past catches up with Alex as the current teenage girls living in the village are also in danger...

== Reception ==
Dipal Acharya in Evening Standard explains that Watson "attempts to navigate some complex questions raised by social media, such as how our default communities are more likely to be found online than next door, how we document everything from banal daily rituals to shocking acts of abuse on our smartphones so relentlessly and openly, the disconnect between our online and real life personas which embolden us in damaging ways, as well as how we process trauma." But Dipal concludes that "his investigation of these themes is undermined by the plot, which veers between improbable and completely implausible. As with so many books that follow successful debuts, it is also frustratingly long. Ironically, Final Cut could do with a little trim.

More reviews are more positive though:

Alison Flood writing in The Observer praises the novel "The reader begins to suspect the reality of Alex’s past just as she does, with Watson adroitly bringing the strands of his story together to create a disturbing journey to a shocking truth.

Kirkus Reviews writes "Watson gradually turns up the heat while carefully teasing out wicked secrets...and Alex, who has her own secrets, makes an appealing, if possibly unreliable, narrator. The darkness runs deep in this skillfully plotted chiller."

In Publishers Weekly, Clare Conville writes " A tight, brisk plot drives this sharp character study. Watson perfectly capture small town ennui while illustrating how corruption can hide in plain sight."
