= Robyn Scott =

New Zealand journalist, writer, businesswoman

- Born: 9 January 1981 (age 45); United Kingdom
- Education: University of Cambridge
- Occupations: Entrepreneur and writer
- Writing career
- Notable work: Twenty Chickens for a Saddle
- Website: Official website

Robyn Scott (born 9 January 1981) is a British-born writer and entrepreneur.

She studied at Auckland University and Cambridge University. She was a Gates Scholar. Her first book, Twenty Chickens for a Saddle, a memoir about growing up in Botswana, was published in March 2008. Her second book, Big Like Coca-Cola, is about a group of maximum security prisoners in South Africa who have adopted AIDS orphans. Scott is also a co-founder of start-up OneLeap, and of Southern African social enterprises Brothers for All and Mothers for All. She is presently CEO of policy platform Apolitical.

== Biography ==
Born in England, Scott moved with her parents to New Zealand briefly and then Botswana, where she spent most of her childhood. She attended high school in Bulawayo, Zimbabwe and subsequently studied Bioinformatics at the University of Auckland followed by a Master of Bioscience Enterprise at the University of Cambridge. She is an ambassador for the Access to Medicine Index and a World Economic Forum Young Global Leader. She was on Wired's 2012 Smart List of Fifty People Who Will Change The World. She is now CEO of Apolitical, a global platform for policymakers that specialises in government innovation.

== Bibliography ==
=== Books ===
- Scott, Robyn (2009). Twenty chickens for a saddle: the story of an African childhood. London: Bloomsbury. ISBN 9780747596561.
- Scott, Robyn (Forthcoming). Big like Coca-Cola.

=== Articles ===
- Scott, Robyn (4 November 2005). "Housing challenge winners revealed". Financial Times.

=== Radio ===
- Hammersley, Ben (host); Scott, Robyn (speaker); Edwards, Giles (producer) (22 October 2014). "Risk and reward | When crazy makes sense: the case for more radical social innovation". Four Thought. London. Event occurs at 8.45pm. BBC Radio 4.

=== TEDx lectures ===
- TEDx Talks (15 May 2012). "The power of human | Robyn Scott at TEDxCalicoCanyon". Ted.com. Archived from the original on 12 December 2021.
- TEDx Talks (30 June 2014). "Leadership lessons behind bars | Robyn Scott at TEDxOxbridge". Ted.com. Archived from the original on 12 December 2021.
