= Jack Phipps =

British arts administrator

John Richard Noel "Jack" Phipps CBE (24 December 1925 – 6 August 2010) was a British arts administrator.

== Origins and education ==
Phipps was born at Chipata (then "Fort Jameson") in Northern Rhodesia (now Zambia), the son of John Nigel Phipps, a tea planter. The Phipps family originated in Wiltshire, John Nigel Phipps being the great-grandson of the coffee merchant John Lewis Phipps.

Phipps was educated at Harrow School (briefly), St John’s College, Johannesburg, and at Merton College, Oxford.

== Career ==
After a four-year spell as a management trainee at the Daily Mail, Phipps went to work for Ian Hunter at the Harold Holt music management agency in 1954, before he and his wife set up their own management agency in 1965. Their clients included Benjamin Britten (who was also godfather to Phipps’s son Martin), Pilar Lorengar, Jessye Norman and Jill Gomez. During his career Phipps forged close links with many musicians, including Colin Davis, Daniel Barenboim, Bernard Haitink and Yehudi Menuhin. In 1969, Phipps acted as co-director of the Bath International Music Festival. This led to an approach from the Arts Council of Great Britain, which in 1970 asked him to organise regional tours of opera, ballet and drama. In his capacity as director of touring, he did much to encourage the development of the regional opera companies and regional theatre. Apart from a brief interlude as general manager of the Aldeburgh Festival, he remained at the Arts Council until his retirement in 1991. In the year of his retirement, he was appointed CBE.

== Personal life ==
Phipps was married twice: firstly to Anne Nichol Smith, in 1950, with whom he had two children, Polly and Simon; and secondly to Sue Pears (the niece of Sir Peter Pears) with whom he had a son, the composer Martin Phipps.
