= Anne-Marie Duff =

British actress (born 1970)

Anne-Marie Duff OBE
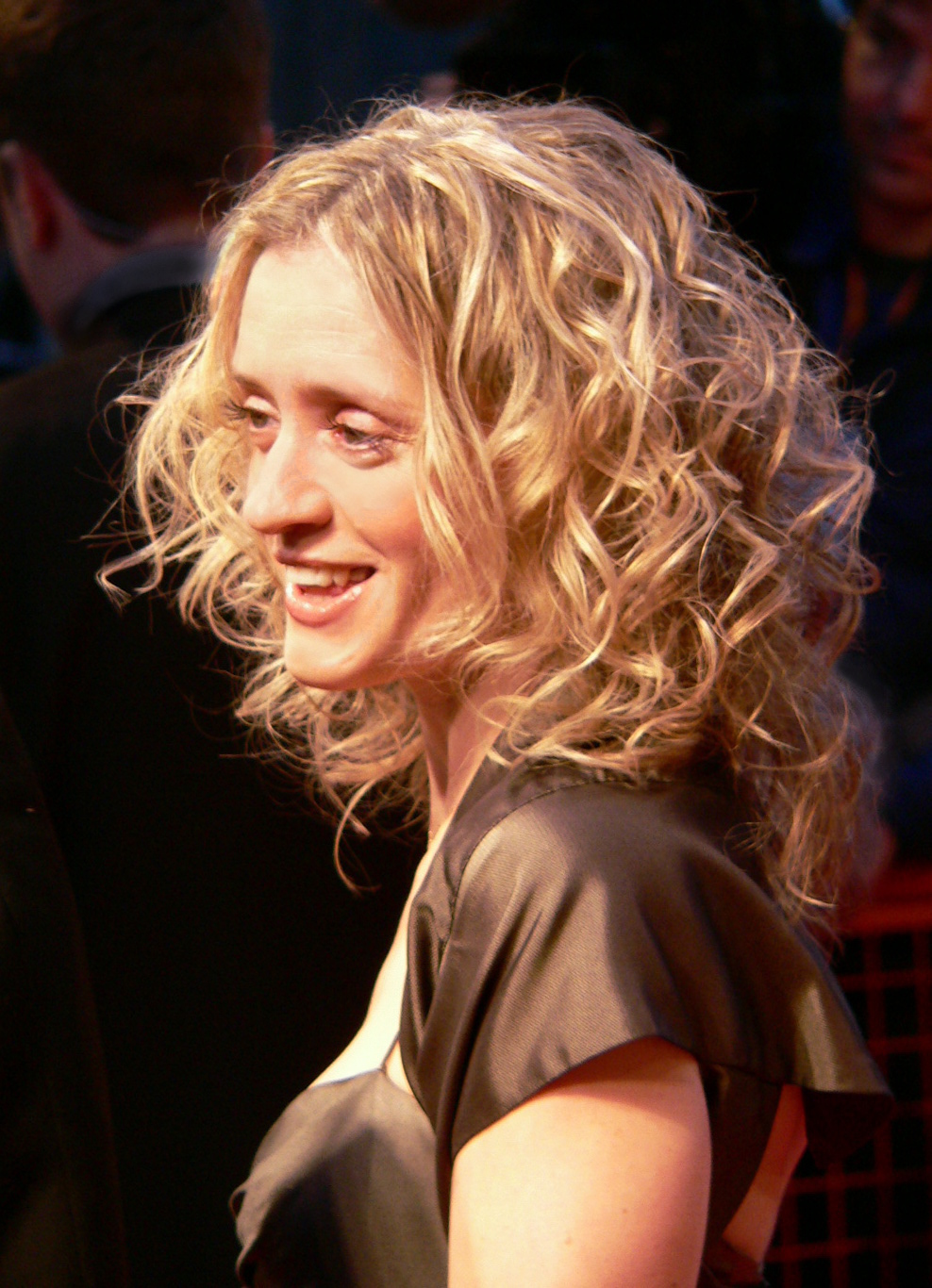
- Duff in 2007
- Born: 8 October 1970 (age 56); London, England
- Education: Drama Centre London (BA)
- Occupations: Actress; narrator
- Years active: 1994–present
- Spouse: James McAvoy (m. 2006; div. 2016)
- Children: 1

Anne-Marie Duff (born 8 October 1970) is a British actress and narrator. She is best known for her BAFTA-nominated television roles in Shameless and The Virgin Queen, and her performance as Grace Williams in Bad Sisters, for which she won the Best Supporting Actress BAFTA in 2024.

She initially rose to fame for her role in Peter Mullan's The Magdalene Sisters (2001), before appearing in films, such as Notes on a Scandal (2006), Garage (2007), Is Anybody There? (2008), The Last Station (2009), Nowhere Boy (2009), Before I Go to Sleep (2014) and Suffragette (2015).

== Early life and education ==
Duff was born in London on 8 October 1970, the younger of two children of Irish immigrants: her father, a painter and decorator at Fuller's Brewery in Chiswick, was from County Meath and her mother was from County Donegal and worked in a shoe shop. The family lived in Southall, London, and Duff attended Mellow Lane School. While at school, she joined the school choir, where she discovered she could 'really sing'. She paid for singing lessons with a woman who taught classical singing, who made a huge impact. Duff initially thought about pursuing a career as a singer and talked about it in great depth with her teacher, who looked at her and said, 'I think you have the soul of an actor.' At an early age, Duff attended a local youth theatre, Young Argosy, linked to the Argosy Players, in order to battle her shy nature; she soon became hooked on the stage. After further study of Film and Theatre, at the age of 19, she attended the Drama Centre in London, alongside John Simm, Anastasia Hille and her good friend Paul Bettany.

== Career ==
=== Screen work ===
After graduating from Drama Centre, Duff made her first television appearance in ITV drama Trial & Retribution as Cathy Gillingham for two episodes in 1997. She later made appearances in series such as Amongst Women, in Aristocrats as Lady Louisa Lennox and in 2003 BBC television film Charles II: The Power and the Passion as Henrietta of England. She first came to the attention of the British public in 2002 for her work playing Margaret in The Magdalene Sisters. She also had a minor role in Holby City as Alison McCarthy. Duff played Holly in the first series of Simon Nye sitcom, Wild West, alongside Dawn French and Catherine Tate in 2002. In 2002, Duff appeared in her first major film role as Margaret McGuire in The Magdalene Sisters.

Duff's first critical acclaim came for her portrayal of Queen Elizabeth I in the lavish 2005 BBC television miniseries The Virgin Queen, which also starred Tom Hardy, Emilia Fox and Sienna Guillory. For Elizabeth I, she was nominated for the British Academy Television Award for Best Actress in both 2006 and 2007. She was awarded the BAFTA Cymru Award for Best Actress for her work in the 2007 television film The History of Mr Polly.

Following her breakthrough, Duff started working in films, first appearing in Notes on a Scandal, alongside Judi Dench. After film roles in Irish film Garage and The Waiting Room, she next appeared in a main role in comedy film French Film and Is Anybody There? in 2008. In 2009, Duff received further attention when she played the mother of John Lennon, Julia Stanley, a role for which she won British Independent Film Award for Best Supporting Actress in Nowhere Boy. She also appeared in The Last Station, a biopic about Leo Tolstoy's later years, in which she played his devoted daughter Sasha. She appeared in less-known film roles following this before her appearance in the 2014 film Before I Go to Sleep. Throughout this time, Duff continued to appear on mainstream television in Parade's End, a five-part BBC/HBO/VRT television serial adapted from the tetralogy of eponymous novels (1924–1928) by Ford Madox Ford as Edith Duchemin and in BBC One crime drama From Darkness which premiered in October 2015, appearing in the starring role. Of Duff's performance, Metro stated "Not a fan of police procedural dramas? Good, because this ain't that. From Darkness is a character-driven tale of one women's journey and resolve and it includes a bloody brilliant performance by Duff."

In 2015, she played Violet Miller in the film Suffragette, a working-woman who introduces Maud Watts (Carey Mulligan) to the fight for women's rights in east London.

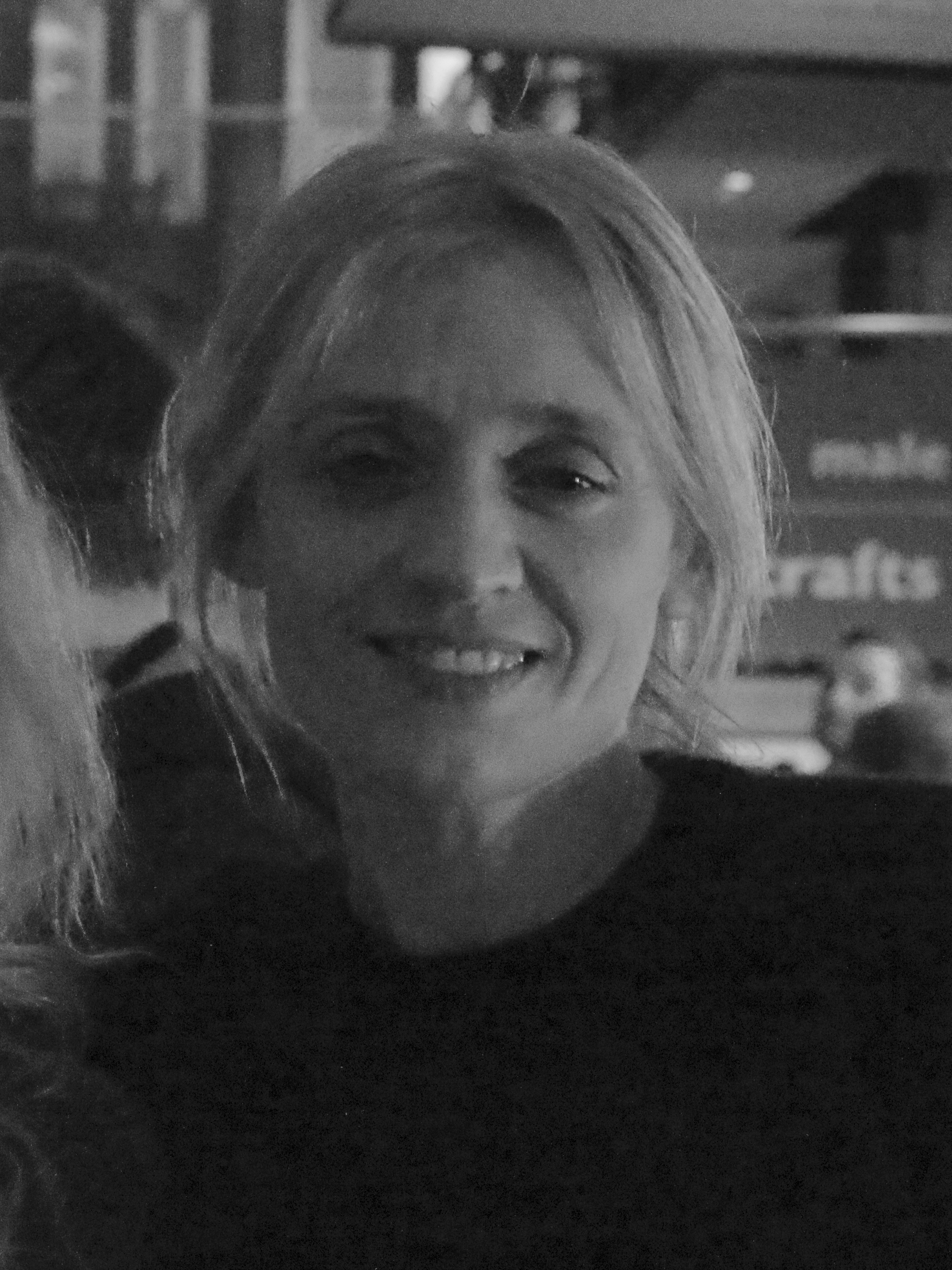
Duff at the press night for the Royal Exchange Theatre's play Husbands & Sons in 2016

In 2016, Duff was cast in an BBC animated miniseries of Watership Down, alongside her former husband James McAvoy. It premiered in December 2018; Duff appeared as Hyzenthlay. In 2019, Duff once again appeared with McAvoy in the BBC One and HBO adaption of Philip Pullman's His Dark Materials.

In 2020, Duff portrayed Erin Wiley, the estranged heroin addict mother of established character Maeve in the second season of the Netflix original series Sex Education. She later returned to the role for the third season. In June 2020, Duff appeared in a main role as Tracy Daszkiewicz in three-part drama The Salisbury Poisonings. The series portrays the 2018 Novichok poisoning crisis in Salisbury, England, and the subsequent Amesbury poisonings.

Duff narrated the BBC Two documentary Hospital in 2017.

In 2022, Duff portrayed Grace Williams in the Irish black comedy series Bad Sisters. She won Best Supporting Actress for this role at the 2023 British Academy Television Awards and the 19th Irish Film & Television Awards.

=== Stage work ===
An accomplished theatre actor, she has worked extensively with the Royal National Theatre, including its 1996 production of Helen Edmundson's adaptation of Leo Tolstoy's War and Peace, and also in London's West End (Vassa, Collected Stories). Credits at the National Theatre include Collected Stories, King Lear and the title character in Marianne Elliott's production of George Bernard Shaw's Saint Joan to great acclaim. In 2011 she played Alma Rattenbury in Terence Rattigan's final play Cause Célèbre at The Old Vic, directed by Thea Sharrock. In 2026, she is to star as Julie Robson in Helen Edmundson's new play, Some Woman at the National Theatre.

Duff was nominated for a Laurence Olivier Award in 2000.

== Personal life ==
Duff married Scottish actor James McAvoy in 2006, and gave birth to their son in 2010. On 13 May 2016, Duff and McAvoy announced they were divorcing. To minimise disruption to their son's life, they initially shared a home in North London when not working elsewhere.

She admits to being "a hopeless romantic. And that means sometimes I'll burn with pain as well as burn with desire, I will. 'Cos that's the nature of opening your heart up to someone else ... This sounds ironic, of course, but sometimes in a marriage you are never closer than the moment at which the two of you decide it's time to finish."

Duff was appointed Officer of the Order of the British Empire (OBE) in the 2025 New Year Honours for services to drama.

=== Activism ===
In 2007, she was one of nine female celebrities to take part in the What's it going to take? campaign promoting awareness of domestic abuse in the United Kingdom.

== Acting credits ==
=== Film ===
| Year | Production | Role | Notes |
|---|---|---|---|
| 1998 | Mild and Bitter | The Woman | Short film |
| 2001 | Enigma | Kay | |
| 2002 | The Magdalene Sisters | Margaret | |
| 2006 | Notes on a Scandal | Annabel | |
| 2007 | Garage | Carmel | |
| 2007 | The Waiting Room | Anna | |
| 2008 | Is Anybody There? | Mum | |
| 2008 | French Film | Sophie | |
| 2009 | The Last Station | Sasha Tolstoy | |
| 2009 | Nowhere Boy | Julia Lennon | |
| 2012 | Sanctuary | Maire | |
| 2013 | Closed Circuit | Melissa | |
| 2014 | Before I Go to Sleep | Claire | |
| 2015 | Molly Moon and the Incredible Book of Hypnotism | Librarian (Lucy Logan) | |
| 2015 | Suffragette | Violet Miller | |
| 2016 | Miranda's Letter | Mother | Short film |
| 2017 | On Chesil Beach | Marjorie Mayhew | |
| 2026 | Aschenputtel: A Marionnette Show | Narrator | A puppet short film based on the Grimm Brothers' variant of the fairytale Cinderella. |

=== Television ===
| Year | Production | Role | Notes |
|---|---|---|---|
| 1997 | Trial & Retribution | Cathy Gillingham | Series 1; episodes 1 & 2: "Trial & Retribution I" - Parts 1 & 2 |
| 1998 | Amongst Women | Sheila | Mini-series; episodes 1–4 |
| 1999 | Aristocrats | Lady Louisa | Mini-series; episodes 2–5 |
| 2000 | Reach for the Moon | Cath Bird | Mini-series; unknown episodes |
| 2001 | The Way We Live Now | Georgiana Longestaffe | Mini-series; episodes 1–4 |
| 2002 | Sinners | Anne Marie / Theresa | Television film |
| 2002 | Holby City | Alison McCarthy | Series 4; episode 32: "Lives Worth Living" |
| 2002 | Wild West | Holly | Series 1; episodes 1–6 |
| 2002 | Doctor Zhivago | Olya Demina | Mini-series; episodes 1 & 2 |
| 2003 | Charles II: The Power and the Passion | Minette (Henrietta of England) | Mini-series; episode 3 |
| 2004–2005, 2013 | Shameless | Fiona Gallagher | Main role. Series 1 & 2; 18 episodes, & series 11; episode 14 |
| 2005–2006 | The Virgin Queen | Queen Elizabeth I | Mini-series; episodes 1–4 |
| 2006 | Born Equal | Michelle | Television film |
| 2007 | The History of Mr Polly | Miriam Larkins | Television film |
| 2008 | Pop Britannia | Herself - Narrator | Mini-series; episodes 1–3 |
| 2009 | Margot | Margot Fonteyn | Television film |
| 2012 | Accused | Mo Murray | Series 2; episode 2: "Mo's Story" |
| 2012 | Parade's End | Edith Duchemin | Mini-series; episodes 1–3 & 5 |
| 2015 | From Darkness | Claire Church | Mini-series; episodes 1–4 |
| 2016 | Murder | DCI Mirella Goss | Mini-series; episode 2: "Lost Weekend" |
| 2017 | Hospital | Herself - Narrator | Series 1; episodes 1–6 |
| 2018 | Watership Down | Hyzenthlay (voice) | Mini-series; episodes 1–4 |
| 2019 | His Dark Materials | Ma Costa | Series 1; episodes 1–3, 5 & 6 |
| 2020 | The Salisbury Poisonings | Tracy Daszkiewicz | Mini-series; episodes 1–3 |
| 2020–2021 | Sex Education | Erin Wiley | Netflix Original series 2 & 3; 11 episodes |
| 2022–2024 | Suspect | Dr. Susannah Newman | Series 1 & 2; 16 episodes |
| 2022–2024 | Bad Sisters | Grace Williams / Grace Reilly | Apple TV+ series 1 & 2; 14 episodes |
| 2024 | The Read | Herself - Narrator | Series 3; episode 2: "A Christmas Carol" |
| 2025 | Reunion | Christine Mokhtar | Episodes 1–4 |

=== Radio and audio ===
| Year | Production | Role | Notes |
|---|---|---|---|
| 1997 | The Playboy of the Western World | Sarah Tansey | Radio drama |
| 1998 | Twelfth Night | Viola | |
| 2000 | The Art of Love | Cypassis | |
| 2000 | Diary of a Provincial Lady | Mamselle | Radio series |
| 2001 | A Time That Was | Sim | Radio drama |
| 2003 | Stranges and Brothers | Rosalind | Radio drama |
| 2003 | Carmilla | Laura | Radio drama |
| 2004 | Life Half Spent | Joanne | Radio play |
| 2004 | Jane Eyre | Narrator | Radio drama |
| 2005 | Ears Wide Open | Diane | |
| 2005 | Othello | Desdemona | Audiobook |
| 2006 | The Queen at 80 | Narrator | Radio series |
| 2006 | The Possessed | Liza / Marya | Radio drama |
| 2006 | Look Back in Anger | Alison | Rehearsed reading |
| 2007 | Kingdom of the Golden Dragon | Narrator | Radio drama |
| 2008 | Twenty Chickens for a Saddle | Narrator | Radio drama |
| 2009 | The Little Mermaid | Narrator | Radio drama |
| 2010 | Thumbelina | Narrator | Radio drama |
| 2011 | Cause Célèbre | Alma Rattenbury | Radio drama |
| 2015 | Kingdom of Cloud | Juliet | Radio drama |
| 2015 | The Master and Margarita | Margarita | Radio drama |
| 2017 | A Streetcar Named Desire | Blanche DuBois | Radio drama |
| 2020 | Tess of the D'Urbervilles | Narrator | Audiobook |
| 2020 | The Mill on the Floss | Narrator | Audiobook |
| 2021 | The Absolute Book | Narrator | Audiobook |
| 2022 | Unmade Movies: Dennis Potter's The White Hotel | Narrator | Audiobook |

=== Theatre ===
| Year | Production | Role | Notes |
|---|---|---|---|
| 1994 | Uncle Silas | Maud Ruthyn | |
| 1994 | The Mill on the Floss | First Maggie | |
| 1995 | La Grande Magia | Amelia | |
| 1995–1996 | Peter Pan | Wendy | |
| 1996 | War and Peace | Natasha | |
| 1997–1998 | King Lear | Cordelia | |
| 1999 | Vassa | Lyudmila | |
| 1999–2000 | Collected Stories | Lisa | |
| 2000 | A Doll's House | Nora | |
| 2002 | The Daughter in Law | Minnie | |
| 2004 | The Playboy of the Western World | Pegeen Mike | |
| 2005 | Days of Wine and Roses | Mona | |
| 2007 | The Soldier's Fortune | Lady Dunce | Young Vic, London |
| 2007 | Saint Joan | Joan | Olivier Theatre, London |
| 2011 | Cause Célèbre | Alma Rattenbury | Old Vic, London |
| 2012 | Berenice | Berenice | Donmar Warehouse, London |
| 2013 | Strange Interlude | Nina Leeds | National Theatre, London |
| 2013 | Macbeth | Lady Macbeth | Broadway debut, Lincoln Center Theater |
| 2015 | Husbands & Sons | Lizzie Holroyd | Co-production between National Theatre, London and Royal Exchange, Manchester |
| 2016 | Oil | May | Almeida Theatre, London |
| 2017 | Common | Mary | Royal National Theatre, London |
| 2017 | Heisenberg | Georgie | Wyndham’s Theatre, London |
| 2018 | Macbeth | Lady Macbeth | Royal National Theatre, London |
| 2019 | Sweet Charity | Charity Hope Valentine | Donmar Warehouse, London |
| 2022 | The House of Shades | Constance Webster | Almeida Theatre, London |
| 2024–2025 | The Little Foxes | Regina Giddens | Young Vic, London |
| 2026 | Some Woman | Julie Robson | National Theatre, London |

== Awards and nominations ==
| Year | Award | Category | Nominated work | Result |
|---|---|---|---|---|
| 2000 | Laurence Olivier Awards | Best Actress in a Supporting Role | Collected Stories | Nominated |
| 2001 | Shanghai Television Festival | Best Actress | Sinners | Won |
| 2004 | Irish Film and Television Awards | Best Actress in a TV Drama | Shameless | Won |
| 2005 | Irish Film and Television Awards | Best Actress in a TV Drama | Shameless | Nominated |
| 2005 | Broadcasting Press Guild | Best Actress | Shameless | Won |
| 2005 | British Academy Television Awards | Best Actress | Shameless | Nominated |
| 2006 | British Academy Television Awards | Best Actress | Shameless | Nominated |
| 2006 | Royal Television Society | Best Female Actor | Shameless | Won |
| 2007 | British Academy Television Awards | Best Actress | The Virgin Queen | Nominated |
| 2007 | Evening Standard Theatre Awards | Best Actress | Saint Joan | Won |
| 2007 | Irish Film and Television Awards | Best Actress in a Lead Role in Television | The Virgin Queen | Nominated |
| 2008 | Laurence Olivier Awards | Best Actress | Saint Joan | Nominated |
| 2008 | BAFTA Cymru | Best Actress | The History of Mr Polly | Won |
| 2008 | Irish Film and Television Awards | Best Actress in a Supporting Role | Garage | Nominated |
| 2010 | Evening Standard British Film Awards | Best Actress | Nowhere Boy | Won |
| 2010 | British Independent Film Awards | Best Supporting Actress | Nowhere Boy | Won |
| 2010 | London Film Critics' Circle Award | British Supporting Actress of the Year | Nowhere Boy | Won |
| 2010 | BAFTA Award | Best Actress in a Supporting Role | Nowhere Boy | Nominated |
| 2010 | Empire Award | Best Actress | Nowhere Boy | Nominated |
| 2010 | Irish Film and Television Awards | Best Actress in a Supporting Role in a Film | Nowhere Boy | Nominated |
| 2010 | Satellite Award | Best Supporting Actress – Motion Picture | Nowhere Boy | Nominated |
| 2012 | Irish Film and Television Awards | Best Actress in a Film | Sanctuary | Nominated |
| 2015 | British Independent Film Awards | Best Supporting Actress | Suffragette | Nominated |
| 2019 | Evening Standard Theatre Awards | Best Musical Performance | Sweet Charity | Won |
| 2022 | Peabody Award | Entertainment | Bad Sisters | Won |
| 2023 | British Academy Television Award | British Academy Television Award for Best Supporting Actress | Bad Sisters | Won |
