= Gerald McMorrow =

English writer & filmmaker (born 1970)

- Born: 12 February 1970 (age 55); London, England
- Occupation(s): Filmmaker, Writer

Gerald McMorrow (born 12 February 1970) is an English writer and filmmaker.

== Career ==
McMorrow studied cinema in New York and began his career directing music videos for artists like Tom Jones and Catatonia. He later worked with advertising, directing television advertisement for agencies like Saatchi & Saatchi and winning one Creative Circle and British Television Advertising Award.

In 2002, he debuted in filmmaking, writing and directing the short film "Thespian X", which won the "TCM Prize" in the London Film Festival. In 2008, he made his debut in feature films with Franklyn, a sci-fi story split between two parallel universes. The contemporary London and a dystopic-otherworldly metropolis called Meanwhile City.

== Work ==
- Franklyn (2008)
