= Tracy Daszkiewicz =

British public health official

- Alma mater: Open University; Manchester University; Nottingham Trent University; Hill College; University of the West of England; University of Hertfordshire
- Employer: Public Health England; Wiltshire Council (–2020)
- Awards: (2022); honorary doctorate (2022, Open University)

Tracy Daszkiewicz (born 17 November 1973) is Executive Director of Public Health and Strategic Partnership at Aneurin Bevan University Health Board. She is also the current President of the Faculty of Public Health and was formerly the Director of Public Health and Safety for the county of Wiltshire, England, where in 2018 she played a leading role in the response to the Novichok poisoning of Sergei and Yulia Skripal in Salisbury.

== Career ==
She began her career as a health clinic receptionist in Coventry, then undertook a degree in social work with the Open University.

=== Novichok poisonings ===
Although she had worked for Wiltshire Council for ten years, she had only been in post as Director of Public Health for three months at the time of the Skripal poisonings in March 2018 (she had previously served in the post in an interim role). Her work on the incident, and the subsequent poisonings of Charlie Rowley and Dawn Sturgess (the latter fatal), resulted in her being profiled by The Guardian in January 2019.

She was portrayed by Anne-Marie Duff (and was briefly seen, as herself, in a non speaking role) in the three-part BBC Television drama The Salisbury Poisonings, screened in June 2020, in preparation for which she was "interviewed extensively" by the programme makers. Lawrence Bowen, the series' executive producer, said:

When we met her and spoke to her, we felt that we'd sort of found a core point of view that sort of made sense of all these multiple points of view that we’d discovered in the research.

Daszkiewicz was reported as saying that her character in the series is a composite of many different people who dealt with the aftermath. The series resulted in her receiving renewed media attention, including an interview in The Telegraph, which described her as:

instrumental at every stage following the Skripal poisonings, from the initial response to declaring Salisbury safe.

=== Later work ===
She also played a leading role in Wiltshire Council's response to the 2020 COVID-19 pandemic.

In June 2020, she joined Public Health England as Deputy Director of Population Health and Wellbeing for South-West England.

== Awards ==
Daszkiewicz received an honorary degree from the University of the West of England in 2022.

== Personal life ==
Daszkiewicz is married to Ted (played by William Houston in The Salisbury Poisonings), with three daughters and a son. As of 2020, the couple live near Salisbury.
