= S. J. Watson =

English writer

- Born: 1971 (age 54–55); Stourbridge
- Occupation: Writer
- Writing career
- Language: English language

Steve "S. J." Watson (born 1971) is an English writer. He debuted in 2011 with the thriller novel Before I Go to Sleep. Rights to publish the book have been sold in 42 countries and it has continued to be an international bestseller.

== Personal life ==
Watson was born in Stourbridge, Worcestershire (now West Midlands). He studied physics at the University of Birmingham and then moved to London, where he worked in various hospitals and specialized as an audiologist in the diagnosis and treatment of hearing-impaired children. In the evenings and weekends he wrote fiction.

== Writing career ==
In 2009 Watson was accepted for the first course Writing a Novel at the Faber Academy. The result was his debut, Before I Go to Sleep. He was introduced to literary agent Clare Conville on the last night of the course and she agreed to represent him. The book was published in 2011. In the same year, the rights to adapt the film for the big screen by was purchased. The film was released in 2014.

Watson's second novel, Second Life, was published in February 2015, with two further books scheduled for 2017 and 2019.

S. J. Watson published his third novel, Final Cut, with Transworld. It is about a documentary film-maker who starts to uncover a seaside community's "dark and extraordinary secret".

In June 2026, it was announced that Watson’s fourth novel, Before I Sleep Forever, would be published by Orenda Books on 6 May 2027. The novel is a sequel to his debut, and revisits its protagonist, Christine Lucas.

== Media interest ==
Media interest in Before I Go to Sleep was considerable, and Watson himself was the subject of a profile in The Sunday Times before its UK publication, and The Wall Street Journal before its US publication. Watson has been profiled by Books+Publishing, and interviewed by Kirsty Lang on BBC Radio 4's Front Row. He was also interviewed by Simon Mayo when Before I Go to Sleep was chosen as Mayo's book club book of the month.

== Published works ==
- —— (2011). Before I Go to Sleep. Text Publishing Company. ISBN 9781921758157.
- —— (2015). Second Life. Transworld Publishers. ISBN 9780857520203.
- —— (2020). Final Cut. Transworld Publishers. ISBN 9780062382160.
- —— (2027). Before I Sleep Forever. Orenda Books. ISBN 9781917764957.
