= Brighton Rock (1948 film) =

Film by John Boulting

- Directed by: John Boulting
- Written by: Graham Greene; Terence Rattigan
- Based on: Brighton Rock (1938 novel) by Graham Greene; Brighton Rock (1943 play) by Frank Harvey
- Produced by: Roy Boulting
- Starring: Richard Attenborough; Hermione Baddeley; William Hartnell; Carol Marsh
- Cinematography: Harry Waxman
- Edited by: Peter Graham Scott
- Music by: Hans May
- Production companies: Charter Film Productions; Associated British Picture Corporation
- Distributed by: Pathé Pictures
- Release date: 8 January 1948 (Brighton)
- Running time: 92 minutes
- Country: United Kingdom
- Language: English
- Budget: £192,436
- Box office: £190,147 (UK)

Brighton Rock (initially released in the United States as Young Scarface) is a 1948 British film noir directed by John Boulting, produced Roy Boulting, and starring Richard Attenborough, Hermione Baddeley, William Hartnell and Carol Marsh in her film debut. It is based on the 1938 novel by Graham Greene, who also co-wrote the screenplay with Terence Rattigan, and its 1943 stage adaptation by Frank Harvey.

The film follows "Pinkie" Brown (Attenborough), a psychopathic young mob enforcer, who murders a journalist and later desperately tries to cover his tracks. In the process, he tries to manipulate a naive young woman (Marsh) into a romantic relationship. The title comes from the old-fashioned confectionery "a stick of rock": the character Ida (Baddeley) in the film says that like Brighton rock she doesn't change—as the name Brighton stays written the whole way through.

Brighton Rock was released by Pathé Pictures on January 8, 1948. Though a commercial success, it polarized critics on initial release due to its violence and dark themes. Retrospective reviews have been very positive, with the film considered a quintessential British film noir, and the British Film Institute ranking at No. 15 in its 1999 survey of the top 100 British films.

== Plot ==
In Brighton in June 1935, a gangster named Kite is found dead, shortly after a newspaper published a story exposing local rackets and gang wars. Kite's old gang, now led by the psychopathic teenaged hoodlum Pinkie Brown, learns that the reporter who wrote the story, Fred Hale, will be in town for one day for a promotional stunt (similar to the real-life "Lobby Lud" promotion). Fred will play "Kolley Kibber", leaving cards around town that can be redeemed for a monetary prize, with a larger prize for the first person who publicly identifies Fred as Kolley Kibber.

Pinkie and the gang hold Fred responsible for Kite's death. They confront Fred in a local pub, threaten him, and pursue him through the crowded resort town before Pinkie finally murders Fred on the ghost train. While Fred is attempting to elude the gang, he meets brassy, outgoing Ida Arnold, a middle-aged entertainer currently appearing in a local show. Ida takes a liking to Fred and notes that he appears to be afraid. The police think that Fred's death is a heart attack or suicide, but Ida suspects foul play and begins her own amateur investigation.

To establish an alibi for himself, Pinkie sends one of his gang members, Spicer, to distribute Fred's "Kolley Kibber" cards throughout the town, making it look like Fred was going about his business normally. Spicer errs by leaving one card under the tablecloth in a restaurant, creating a risk that the waitress would be able to identify Spicer. Pinkie visits the restaurant and discovers that the sweet, naive young waitress Rose found the card and noticed that it was not Fred who left the card, and is sure she would recognise the person who did, as she has a good memory for faces. Pinkie warns Rose not to speak about the person who left the card, and as part of gaining her confidence, asks her out on a date. Without fully understanding why he has said this, Rose trusts Pinkie and agrees that she will say nothing.

Pinkie is also being pressured by Colleoni, the older and more powerful leader of a rival gang, and owner of the large Cosmopolitan Hotel. He is also pursued by the police, who want him to leave town to avoid further gang warfare. Deciding that Spicer is a liability, Pinkie sends him to the racetrack in hopes that Colleoni's men will kill him there. However, Pinkie is also attacked by Colleoni's men, receiving a long scar on his right cheek, and runs off thinking Spicer is dead. However he is told later that Spicer lived. Pinkie ends up finishing Spicer off himself by pushing him down a stairwell in front of several witnesses.

Rose falls in love with Pinkie, discovering he is also a Catholic, and he decides to marry her so she cannot testify against him. After their wedding, at Rose's request he makes a record of his voice at a fairgrounds booth, on which he says, "What you want me to say is I love you. Well here is the truth. I hate you, you little slut. You make me sick." Rose cherishes the record, wrongly assuming that it contains Pinkie's profession of love, although she does not have a gramophone to play it on and is unaware of its true contents. Ida, who by now suspects Pinkie of killing both Fred and Spicer, poses as Rose's mother to visit her while Pinkie is out and warn her about Pinkie, but Rose is loyal to Pinkie and Ida leaves.

Ida's visit makes Pinkie decide he needs to kill Rose too, and he confides to his last remaining gang member, Dallow, his plan to get Rose to enter a suicide pact with him and kill herself first. Pinkie also tries to destroy the voice recording he made to avoid its becoming evidence after Rose's death, but only succeeds in scratching it. Dallow objects, saying Rose's death is unnecessary because Ida is about to leave Brighton, having been unable to find any convincing evidence against Pinkie. Colleoni has also paid off Pinkie and Dallow to leave town, and they go for a final drink with Rose before departing.

When Ida enters the bar, the paranoid Pinkie decides to carry out his plan for Rose's death, and takes her for a walk on the pier. Pinkie convinces Rose he will soon be hanged and the two of them should commit suicide in order to always stay together. He gives Rose his gun and tries to get her to shoot herself first. Rose is torn between her love for Pinkie and the Catholic prohibition against suicide, and hesitates. Meanwhile, Dallow and Ida, both wishing to protect the innocent Rose, alert police, who rush onto the pier after Pinkie. Upon seeing the police, Rose throws the gun into the water and Pinkie tries to run away, but falls from the pier to his death. A grief-stricken Rose later plays the damaged record of Pinkie's voice, which sticks on Pinkie's words "I love you" without playing the rest.

== Cast ==
- Richard Attenborough as Pinkie Brown
- Hermione Baddeley as Ida Arnold
- Carol Marsh as Rose Brown
- William Hartnell as Dallow
- Harcourt Williams as Prewitt
- Wylie Watson as Spicer
- Nigel Stock as Cubitt
- Alan Wheatley as Fred Hale
- Virginia Winter as Judy
- Reginald Purdell as Frank
- George Carney as Phil Corkery
- Charles Goldner as Colleoni
- Lina Barrie as Molly
- Joan Sterndale-Bennett as Delia
- Harry Ross as Bill Brewer
- Campbell Copelin as Police Inspector
- Marianne Stone as lazy waitress
- Norman Watson as racecourse evangelist

Uncredited

- Carl Ramon as Charlie, the barman
- Ronald Shiner as the look-out
- Constance Smith as singer

== Themes ==
Like the book and like other Greene film adaptations such as The Third Man (1949), the film deals with Roman Catholic doctrines concerning the nature of sin and the basis of morality; damnation, forgiveness and mercy. Rose, and Pinkie (ostensibly), are Catholics, as was Greene; their beliefs are contrasted with Ida's strong but non-religious moral sensibility.

== Production ==
=== Development ===
Greene and Terence Rattigan wrote the screenplay for the 1948 film adaptation, produced and directed by John and Roy Boulting, with assistant director Gerald Mitchell. The ironic ending of the film, in which Rose's damaged gramophone record of Pinkie's voice sticks and repeats the words "I love you", was changed against Greene's wishes from his original story, in which Rose is about to hear the entire recording and will realise that Pinkie hated her. This is described by Greene as "The greatest horror of all". The filmmakers believed censors were likely to object to the more tragic original ending.

The Colleoni gang was modelled after the Sabini racetrack gang of the 1930s, which fought public battles with straight razors in its competition to control crime at racecourses in southern England, including one at Brighton. A former Sabini gang member named Carl Ramon served as technical adviser, including teaching Attenborough how to behave as Pinkie. Ramon also appeared in a non-speaking role as a barman.

=== Casting ===
Most of the principal cast reprised their roles from the 1943 West End play: Richard Attenborough, William Hartnell, Norman Pierce, Harcourt Williams and Hermione Baddeley. The Boultings later stated that they had not actually seen the play, but cast Attenborough on the strength of his performance in In Which We Serve (1942). Instructed to lose weight for the film, Attenborough trained with Chelsea F.C.

Newcomer Carol Marsh was cast as Rose after responding to a newspaper advertisement for a 16 or 17-year-old girl, "frail, innocent, naive, and tolerably but not excessively pretty." Although the film was her most significant role, in 1997 she said that she "had never seen the film and couldn't bear to."

=== Filming ===
Much of the filming was done on location in Brighton, although some locations were recreated at Welwyn Studios. The scenes where Fred is pursued through Brighton were shot with hidden cameras, capturing footage of Brighton residents and tourists engaged in their regular activities, unaware that a movie was being made. The climax of the film takes place at the Palace Pier, which differs from the novel, the end of which takes place in the nearby town of Peacehaven.

The Brighton borough council was opposed to the location shooting, due the film's depiction of the city's criminal underworld, resulting in the guerrilla-style techniques. To appease the local authorities, the filmmakers included an opening disclaimer:

"Brighton today is a large, jolly, friendly seaside town in Sussex, exactly one hour's journey from London. But in the years between the two wars, behind the Regency terraces and crowded beaches, there was another Brighton of dark alleyways and festering slums. From here, the poison of crime and violence and gang warfare began to spread, until the challenge was taken up by the Police. This is a story of that other Brighton - now happily no more."

== Release ==
First screened to the trade and cinema distributors on 25 November 1947, the film held its World Premiere at the ABC Cinema in Brighton on 8 January 1948, followed by a Gala Premiere at the Leicester Square Warner Cinema London on 9 January 1948.

It was banned in New South Wales.

== Reception ==
=== Box office ===
Brighton Rock was described in the trade papers as being a "notable box office attraction" in British cinemas in 1948.

As of 1 April 1950 the film earned distributor's gross receipts of £147,124 in the UK of which £94,902 went to the producer.

=== Critical reception ===
At the time of its release, Brighton Rock caused a critical uproar in Britain due to its depictions of crime and violence, with the Daily Mirror critic denouncing the razor-slashing scenes as "horrific" and concluding, "This film must not be shown."

The Monthly Film Bulletin wrote: "Brighton Rock is disappointing and difficult to follow. Those who have not read the book will be completely at sea, and those who have will be irritated at the tricks played with a superb story. One requires a knowledge of race-gang language to understand what the characters are talking about. The photography, especially in the latter half, is good, but there is not enough Brighton to be seen. It is well acted. Richard Attenborough, as Pinkie, is all Pinkie should be, ruthless, craven, sinister and sadistic, and he looks and lives the part. Carol Marsh, a new find, is a restrained Rose, and Hermione Baddeley, as always, is fruity, common and kind."

Some reviewers, as well as author Greene, also objected to the final scene as sentimental and contrary to the original book's darker ending.

It was less successful in the United States (where it was released as Young Scarface) and critics did not consider its violence excessive.

The film is an example of what theorist Peter Wollen has called a "Spiv cycle" movie, defined by its sympathetic treatment of post-war gangsters.

Over time, Brighton Rock has maintained a good reputation, with the Encyclopedia of Film Noir calling it "superb".

In the British Film Institute's 1999 survey of the top 100 British films, it ranked at #15.

== Remake ==
A new adaptation of the novel, written and directed by Rowan Joffé, was released in the United Kingdom on 4 February 2010. Joffé changed the setting from the 1930s to the 1960s, during the mods and rockers era.

== Revival ==
The original film had a run at Film Forum in New York City 19–26 June 2009, and The New York Times previewed the revival, saying "both [Greene's] Catholicism and his movie-friendliness are in full cry in John Boulting's terrific 1947 gangster picture."

== See also ==
- BFI Top 100 British films
