= Brighton Rock (novel) =

1938 novel by Graham Greene

- First edition cover
- Author: Graham Greene
- Language: English
- Genre: Thriller
- Set in: Brighton in the 1930s
- Publisher: William Heinemann Ltd
- Publication date: 1938
- Publication place: United Kingdom
- Media type: Print (hardback)
- Pages: 361
- OCLC: 3459054
- Dewey Decimal: 823/.912
- LC Class: PZ3.G8319 Br PR6013.R44

Brighton Rock is a novel by Graham Greene, published in 1938 and later adapted for film and theatre. The novel is a murder thriller set in 1930s Brighton. The first of Greene's works to explore Catholic themes and moral issues, its treatment of class privilege and the problem of evil is paradoxical and ambivalent.

== Plot ==
The murder of the gang boss Kite allows the seventeen-year-old sociopath Pinkie to take over his gang. The murder of Kite had been brought about because of a report by Charles "Fred" Hale in the Daily Messenger about his slot machine racket. Now Hale has been sent to Brighton to distribute cards anonymously for a newspaper competition and realises that he is being hunted by Pinkie's mob.

Hale meets middle-aged Ida Arnold by chance in a pub and then on the Palace Pier as the mob is closing in, but he is snatched away without her realising what has happened to him. To confuse the police investigation, Pinkie has gang member Spicer distribute Hale's cards about the town and then tries to retrieve one card from the café in which sixteen-year-old Rose is working as a waitress. Since Rose had spotted Spicer leaving the card, Pinkie realises that she can now disprove his trail of deception and must take measures to prevent this. He therefore courts Rose until she falls in love with him, his aim being to marry her so that she cannot testify against him. In reality he looks down on her, since she comes from the same socially deprived neighbourhood as himself, and is even repelled by her physically.

Back in London, Ida reads about the inquest on Hale's death, which had found that he died of heart failure. Remembering the state of terror that Hale was in when she last saw him, she decides to go down to Brighton and discover the full story. While there she recruits the help of one of her old bed-fellows and manages to finance her trip with a lucky bet at long odds. Her enquiries soon establish the broad outlines of the story, even though Rose consistently refuses to co-operate and warns Pinkie of Ida's investigation.

Pinkie is summoned to an interview with Colleoni, a leading mobster whose aim is to take over all the illegal operations in Brighton. At the time Pinkie is too cocksure to take up Colleoni's invitation to join his operation. Afterwards he pretends to have reconsidered in order to get Colleoni to murder Spicer, whom Pinkie suspects of being close to turning informer. In fact both men are set up for a razor attack at the horse races but escape separately. Discovering that Spicer is still alive, Pinkie throws him to his death from an unstable staircase in their lodgings and implicates their terrified solicitor Prewitt (Note: In the original edition of the novel, the solicitor's name was Drewitt. It was changed to Prewitt ca. 1970.) into helping him cover up the murder.

Prewitt has also helped Pinkie and Rose avoid the legal obstacles to their marriage and Pinkie now discovers that Rose has known of his criminality all along but not minded. Feeling trapped, and with what remains of his gang disintegrating, Pinkie proposes a suicide pact to Rose, on the pretence that Ida is close to having him arrested by the police. His plan is to get her to shoot herself at the developing resort of Peacehaven but not to fulfil his part of the pact. Ida meanwhile has tailed them, sensing that Rose may be in danger, and has brought a policeman along with her. Pinkie's attempt to throw vitriol at his attackers misfires and, blinded by it himself, he runs over a cliff to his death.

Rose later goes to confession and explains to the priest that she had wanted to accompany Pinkie even into damnation. She is told that since Pinkie had loved her, then there was good in him and she might become the means for his ultimate salvation. She leaves, looking forward to playing a recording he made on the day of their marriage, not realising that it really contains the declaration of his hatred.

== Themes ==
There is an incidental link between this novel and Greene's earlier A Gun for Sale (1936), in that the murder of the gang boss Kite, mentioned in A Gun For Sale, allows the seventeen-year-old sociopath Pinkie to take over his gang and thus sets the events of Brighton Rock in motion.

Although ostensibly an underworld thriller, the book is also noted as the first of Greene's series of religious novels and deals with Roman Catholic doctrine concerning the nature of sin and the basis of morality. Pinkie and Rose are Catholics (as was Greene), and their beliefs are contrasted with Ida's sentimental sense of right and wrong. Greene is also initiating here the series of moral problems with which his later novels wrestle. In this case he is asking what place has a creature as heartless as Pinkie within God's infinite mercy. Rose had wanted to share in the damnation that Pinkie had earned, but the solution to her dilemma only arises indirectly in her interview in the confessional. There the priest refers her to the example of an unnamed Frenchman who rebelled against the Catholic doctrine of divine judgment and "who decided that if any soul was going to be damned, he would be damned too." This was, in fact, the case of the writer Charles Péguy.

Another aspect of the problem's difficulty is the impossibility of changing an environmentally conditioned character, as suggested in the title of the novel. Primarily, rock is a hard type of confectionery sold at seaside resorts, with the town's name embedded in the centre and elongated down its length, so that it is revealed wherever the stick is broken. At the most obvious level, it stands for the tawdry 1930s seaside town, from a disadvantaged part of which both Pinkie and Rose have emerged. But in terms of the plot it is also the murder weapon ironically chosen to choke Hale. And beyond that again, it is the symbol of unchangeable human nature for the trite and morally neutral Ida. It was against just such seeming inflexibility that Péguy reacted.

The tourist aspect of Brighton and the gangsterism that takes advantage of it are at odds but depend on each other. The affluent characters coming and going in its luxury hotels and bars contrast with the down-and-out beachcomber, the old woman crouching to say her rosary in an alley, and characters like Pinkie and Rose struggling to escape the slums that bred them. Then there is the irreconcilable difference between the Catholic ideological interpretations of good and evil and Ida's humanistic moral intuition, which goes far beyond a simple contrast of alternatives. The two are mutually exclusive. So, when Ida declares in her argument with Rose in Chapter 7:

"I know the difference between Right and Wrong. They didn't teach you that at school," Rose didn't answer; the woman was quite right: the two words meant nothing to her. Their taste was extinguished by stronger foods - Good and Evil.

This leads to a further paradox on which the novel dwells more than once: that, their common origin apart, Pinkie and Rose are so much opposites that they make a whole. As another interpreter has commented, "Their only possible relation is the paradox of the Catholic novel".

== Adaptations ==
A number of dramatic adaptations continue to be made from the novel. The first of those designed for the stage was written by Walter Kerr and Leo Brady for the Catholic University of America Theatre in Washington, D.C. The show starred Eric Linden as Pinkie and ran from 4 – 10 February in 1942. In Britain the following year, Frank Harvey's play ran for a hundred performances at the Garrick Theatre in the West End, starring Richard Attenborough and Dulcie Gray.

In 2004, composer John Barry and lyricist Don Black wrote a musical version based on the novel. The show opened in London's Almeida Theatre on 20 September and ran until 13 October. However, owing to poor reviews, it failed to get a West End transfer. A more successful adaptation followed in 2018, when Bryony Lavery's play opened at York Theatre Royal in February before touring the UK.

Terence Rattigan and Greene himself wrote the screenplay for a 1948 film, produced and directed by John and Roy Boulting. It again starred Richard Attenborough as Pinkie, with Carol Marsh as Rose. In the United States, the film was released under the title Young Scarface. The climax differs from the novel in taking place at the Palace Pier. In the new century, Rowan Joffé directed a film adaptation which was released in 2010, starring Sam Riley as Pinkie, Andrea Riseborough as Rose and Helen Mirren as Ida Arnold. In a chronological departure from Greene's 1930s novel, the film is set in the Mods and Rockers subculture of a divided Brighton in the 1960s.

There have also been two radio adaptations. Evelyn Russell's 90-minute dramatisation for the BBC Home Service was aired in 1953 with Jimmy Thompson as Pinkie. In 1994, Ken Whitmore adapted the story for a five-episode BBC Radio dramatisation, directed by John Yorke and starring Steven Mackintosh as Pinkie.
