= Before I Go to Sleep =

2011 novel by S. J. Watson

- First edition, with quote from Tess Gerritsen
- Author: S. J. Watson
- Cover artist: Veronique Beranger / Getty Images
- Language: English
- Genre: Thriller, Suspense
- Publisher: Doubleday (United Kingdom); HarperCollins (United States)
- Publication date: April 2011 (United Kingdom); June 2011 (United States)
- Publication place: United Kingdom
- Media type: Print, audiobook, ebook
- Pages: 368
- ISBN: 0-85752-017-2
- Followed by: Second Life

Before I Go to Sleep is the first novel by S. J. Watson, published in the spring of 2011. It became both a Sunday Times and The New York Times bestseller and has been translated into over 40 languages. It has become a bestseller in France, Canada, Bulgaria and the Netherlands. It reached number 7 on the U.S. bestseller list, the highest position for a debut novel by a British author since J. K. Rowling. The New York Times described the author as an "out-of-nowhere literary sensation". He wrote the novel between shifts whilst working as a National Health Service (NHS) audiologist.

== Plot ==
The novel is a psychological thriller about a woman suffering from anterograde amnesia. She wakes up every day with no knowledge of who she is. The novel follows her as she tries to reconstruct her memories from a journal she has been keeping. She learns that she has been seeing a doctor who is helping her to recover her memory, that her name is Christine Lucas, that she is 47 years old and married and has a son. As her journal grows it casts doubts on the truth behind this knowledge as she determines to discover who she really is.

== Reception ==
- John O'Connell writing in The Guardian is full of praise: "it's exceptionally accomplished – like David Nicholls's One Day, a brilliant example of how an unpromisingly high-concept idea can be transformed by skilful execution", "The structure is so dazzling it almost distracts you from the quality of the writing. No question, this is a very literary thriller." and concludes "The most unnerving aspect of Before I Go to Sleep is the way it is rooted in the domestic, the suburban, the trivial. Forget whizz-bang futurism: it proceeds from ordinary life in tiny, terrifying steps, and is all the better for it. The Escher staircase has an oatmeal carpet."
- James Kidd of The Independent has minor reservations :"Watson's take on the material is clever, convincing and moreish. Christine's life is mundane, but filled with tantalising possibilities: the early chapters fly by as you wonder exactly who to trust. The fun comes from spotting the plot holes that Watson later exploits for all they're worth." and he concludes "The ending feels hurried; a sentimental postscript to the meticulously plotted main event. But these are minor gripes. Before I Go to Sleep is an enjoyable and impressive first novel."
- Craig Ranapia in the New Zealand Listener also has reservations, but concludes that the novel is 'slickly readable': "Watson scrupulously plays fair as he unpicks the tangled web surrounding our heroine, until the denouement. The last section turns on a character’s opportune inattention – after being surreally observant for the previous 300 pages – so the last piece of the puzzle can be uncovered. It was a cheat I couldn’t forgive or forget." but concludes "Before I Go to Sleep is still a slickly readable trip across familiar ground that leaves me looking forward to Watson’s second novel."

== Awards ==
- Winner of the 2011 Crime Writers' Association John Creasey (New Blood) Dagger
- Winner of the Galaxy National Book Award for Thriller & Crime Novel of the Year, 2011
- Winner of the Dutch Crimezone Debut of the Year, 2012
- Winner of the French SNCF du polar Prize for best Crime Novel, 2012
- Winner of the Crimefest Audible Sounds of Crime Award for Best Unabridged Audiobook, 2012 (read by Susannah Harker)

== Publication history ==
- 2011, UK, Doubleday, ISBN 0-85752-017-2, Pub date 1 Apr 2011, Hardback
- 2011, Australia, Text Publishing, ISBN 1921758155, Pub date 2 May 2011, Paperback
- 2011, US, HarperCollins, ISBN 0-06-206055-4, Pub date 14 Jun 2011, Hardback
- 2012, UK, Black Swan, ISBN 0-552-16413-5, Pub date 1 Jan 2012, Paperback
- 2012, UK, Audiobooks, ISBN 1846573688, Pub date 1 Mar 2012, audio (read by Susannah Harker)
- 2012, US, HarperCollins, ISBN 0-06-206056-2, Pub date, 07 Deb 2011, Paperback

== Film adaptation ==
Ridley Scott acquired the film rights and hired Rowan Joffé as director. Nicole Kidman leads as Christine Lucas with Colin Firth as her husband. Mark Strong plays Dr Edmund Nash and Anne-Marie Duff plays Christine's friend, Claire. The film was shot in London and at Twickenham Studios.

== See also ==
- Mithya
- Memento
- 50 First Dates
- Nenu Meeku Telusa? Telugu
