= Twenty Chickens for a Saddle =

2008 memoir by Robyn Scott

- First edition
- Author: Robyn Scott
- Language: English
- Publisher: Bloomsbury Publishing
- Publication date: May 6, 2008
- Publication place: United Kingdom
- Media type: Print (Hardback)
- Pages: 464 pp (first edition, hardback)
- ISBN: 0-7475-9596-8 (first edition, hardback)
- OCLC: 191890812

Twenty Chickens for a Saddle: The Story of an African Childhood is a 2008 memoir by British author Robyn Scott.
