= Rowan Joffé =

British screenwriter and director (born 1973)

- Born: Rowan Marc Joffé; 1973 (age 52–53); London, England
- Occupations: Film director, screenwriter
- Parent(s): Roland Joffé; Jane Lapotaire
- Relatives: Nathalie Lunghi (half-sister)

Rowan Marc Joffé (born 1973) is a British screenwriter and director. He is the son of director Roland Joffé and actress Jane Lapotaire, and half-brother of actress Nathalie Lunghi. Joffé began writing plays in university and was eventually awarded a Cameron Mackintosh bursary.

Joffé's first two screenwriting projects (Last Resort and Gas Attack) both won the Best New British Feature Award at the Edinburgh International Film Festival. His 2003 television drama Turkish Delight, about a bored housewife who starts a new job belly dancing, won the Royal Television Society's Best Drama Award (Midland). He directed The Shooting of Thomas Hurndall which won the Best Single Drama Award at the 2009 BAFTA TV Awards.

In 2009, Joffé directed his first feature film, his own adaptation of the novel Brighton Rock which relocates the action to the 1960s.

In 2010, Joffé wrote a screenplay based on the novel A Very Private Gentleman by Martin Booth. It was directed by Anton Corbijn, with George Clooney in the leading role and was eventually released under the title The American.

Joffé's next project as director was an adaptation of the S. J. Watson novel Before I Go to Sleep, with Nicole Kidman in the lead. Joffé also wrote the screenplay adaptation.

In 2017, Tin Star, for which Joffé serves as creator and producer, debuted on Sky Atlantic. The series, starring Tim Roth, was picked up by Amazon Prime Video streaming service for distribution in the United States.

== Filmography ==
Feature films

Year	Title	Director	Writer	Executive producer
2000	Last Resort	No	Yes	No
2007	28 Weeks Later	No	Yes	No
2010	The American	No	Yes	No
2010	Brighton Rock	Yes	Yes	No
2014	Before I Go to Sleep	Yes	Yes	No
2019	The Informer	No	Yes	Yes
2023	Locked In	No	Yes	No
2025	Ballad of a Small Player	No	Yes	No

TV films

Year	Title	Director	Writer
2001	Gas Attack	No	Yes
2007	Secret Life	Yes	Yes
2008	The Shooting of Thomas Hurndall	Yes	No

TV series

Year	Title	Director	Writer	Executive producer	Creator	Notes
2003	The Afternoon Play	No	Yes	No	No	Episode "Turkish Delight"
2017–20	Tin Star	Yes	Yes	Yes	Yes	Wrote 13 episodes; Directed episode "Fun and (S)Laughter"
2026–present	Nocturne	No	Yes	Yes	Yes	
