= Carol Marsh =

English actress (1926–2010)

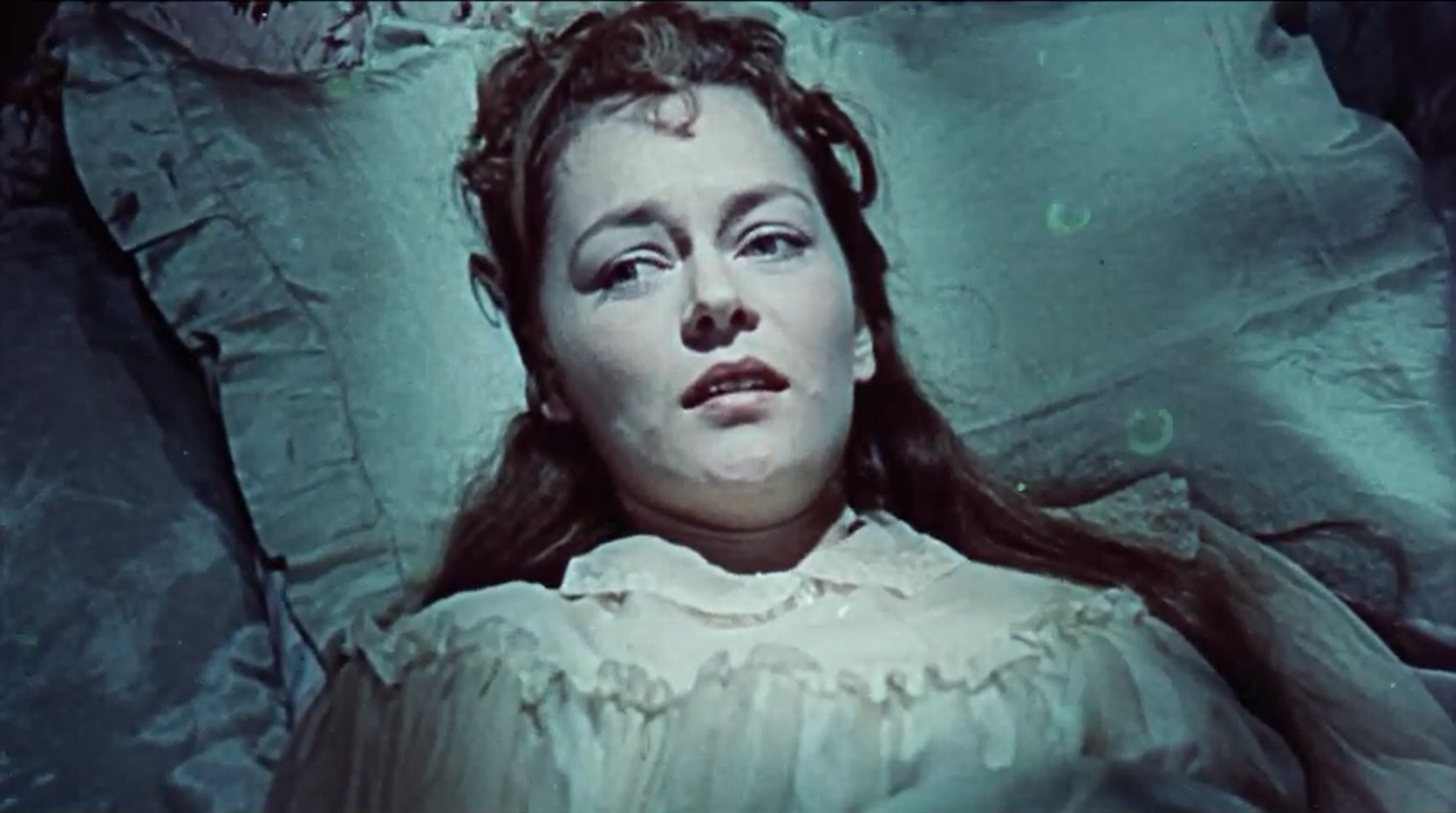
- Marsh in Dracula
- Born: Norma Lilian Simpson; 10 May 1926; Southgate, London, England
- Died: 6 March 2010 (aged 83); London, England
- Occupation: Actress
- Years active: 1947-1974

Carol Marsh (born Norma Lilian Simpson; 10 May 1926 – 6 March 2010) was an English actress best known for playing the part of Rose in the 1947 film Brighton Rock and Lucy Westenra in the 1958 Hammer Horror film Dracula.

== Early life ==
Marsh was born in Southgate in north London and was educated at a convent school, where she often performed in school plays. She won a scholarship to the Royal Academy of Music, where she studied speech and drama as well as singing. She then trained at the Rank Organisation's "charm school", before joining Rank's repertory company at Worthing.

== Career ==
In 1947 Marsh was selected for the role of Rose in the film Brighton Rock after more than 3,000 applicants auditioned. She was twenty-one when she made the film, but later told journalist Nigel Richardson that she had an emotional age of about ten, and was 'preyed upon' during the filming: "People were very, very cruel. Why didn’t they just leave me alone? ... I’ve never seen the film and I couldn’t bear to …. All I’ve seen are when I’ve been sitting at home and clips come on the TV. I was riveted by one shot of me running down the Pier and saying ‘Pinkie!’ I thought, My God what a sweet little girl. So naturally sweet."

After Brighton Rock, Marsh's other notable film roles included Alice in a French-made version of Alice in Wonderland (1949), Susan Graham in Helter Skelter (1949), Fan Scrooge, the sister of Ebenezer Scrooge (played by Alastair Sim) in Scrooge (1951), and as Lucy in the first Hammer version of Dracula (1958), alongside Christopher Lee and Peter Cushing.

From 1950 to the mid-1970s Marsh also appeared in a number of British television dramas, beginning with The Lady's Not For Burning alongside Richard Burton. In the 1970s she appeared on the London West End stage in Agatha Christie's The Mousetrap. She also worked extensively on radio, performing in over a hundred BBC radio plays between 1950 and the 1980s, as well as other radio appearances, including on Children's Hour and Woman's Hour.

== Personal life ==
In later life, Marsh lived largely as a recluse in Bloomsbury, London, where she died on 6th March 2010. She never married.

== Filmography ==
Year	Title	Role	Notes
1947	Brighton Rock	Rose	
1949	Alice in Wonderland	Alice	
1949	Marry Me!	Doris Pearson	
1949	Helter Skelter	Susan Graham	
1949	The Romantic Age	Patricia	
1951	Scrooge	Fan Scrooge	
1952	Salute The Toff	Fay Gretton	
1952	Private Information	Georgie	
1958	Dracula	Lucy Holmwood	
1959	Man Accused	Kathy Riddle	

In addition, between 1950 and 1980s she appeared in numerous television and radio dramas.
