= Death of Jay Slater =

2024 death of a British man in Tenerife, Spain

Jay Slater
- Publicity photo of Slater
- Born: Jay Dean Slater; 26 April 2005
- Died: 17 June 2024 (aged 19); Juan López ravine, Buenavista del Norte, Spain
- Cause of death: Traumatic head injuries
- Body discovered: 15 July 2024
- Burial place: Accrington, Lancashire, England
- Education: West End Primary School; Rhyddings High School
- Occupation: Apprentice bricklayer

In June 2024, 19-year-old British man Jay Slater died in Tenerife, Spain. He had attended a music festival in Playa de las Américas on 16 June, before travelling to the north of the island with two people he met at the festival. On the morning of 17 June, Slater disappeared while attempting the 45-kilometre (28 mi) walk back to his accommodation.

On 15 July 2024, the Spanish police found Slater's body in the vicinity of his last mobile phone location. His traumatic head injuries were consistent with a fall from height, and an inquest into his death found that it was accidental with no third party influence.

Slater's disappearance and death drew substantial media interest. Conspiracy theories about his disappearance circulated on social media, particularly on TikTok and Facebook. Members of the public who travelled to the area during the search were criticised as armchair detectives, while social media users were also criticised for engaging in trolling.

== Background ==
Jay Dean Slater was born to Debbie Duncan and Warren Slater; he had an older brother, Zak. His parents were separated. Slater was educated at West End Primary School and Rhyddings High School in Oswaldtwistle, Lancashire, before attending Accrington and Rossendale College, where he was studying as an apprentice bricklayer. Between the ages of 6 and 17, he played for Huncoat United F.C.

At the time of his disappearance, Slater was aged 19, weighed 70 kilograms (150 lb) and was 1.8 metres (5 ft 11 in) tall. He was of slim build, and had black hair and blue eyes.

== Disappearance ==
Locations relating to Slater's disappearance
1 Slater's apartment, Los Cristianos
2 NRG Festival, Papagayo Beach Club
3 Casa Abuela Tina en Masca
4 Last mobile phone GPS data
5 Body found

Slater attended the three-day NRG Music Festival at Papagayo Beach Club in south Tenerife on the afternoon of 16 June 2024. After the festival, Slater went to the mountain village of Masca with two men he met at the festival, both of whom police deemed to be unconnected to the disappearance.

On 17 June, at around 08:00 WEST, the owner of cafe/villa Casa Abuela Tina in Masca told him that his bus was due at 10:00. She later drove past Slater "walking quickly" in the wrong direction.

At 08:21, Slater called a friend with whom he had travelled to Tenerife, saying he was in the mountains. Another friend called Slater at 08:32, having a conversation lasting approximately two minutes, followed by another call at 08:50 for 22 seconds. Slater told her he was "lost", as he had missed the bus to get south and was attempting to walk from Masca to where he was staying in Los Cristianos on the south coast of Tenerife, a distance of 45 kilometres (28 mi) or 10 to 11 hours on foot. Slater said that his phone had 1% battery, he needed water and that he had "cut his leg" on a cactus, before the call cut out. His last known location was the Teno Nature Reserve. Slater had earlier posted an image on his Snapchat account showing him at the doorway of a property, tagged with the location of the park. He also made a video call to the friend with whom he had travelled to Tenerife, who thought he heard Slater slip on gravel. At 09:04, Slater was reported missing.

== Investigation and search ==
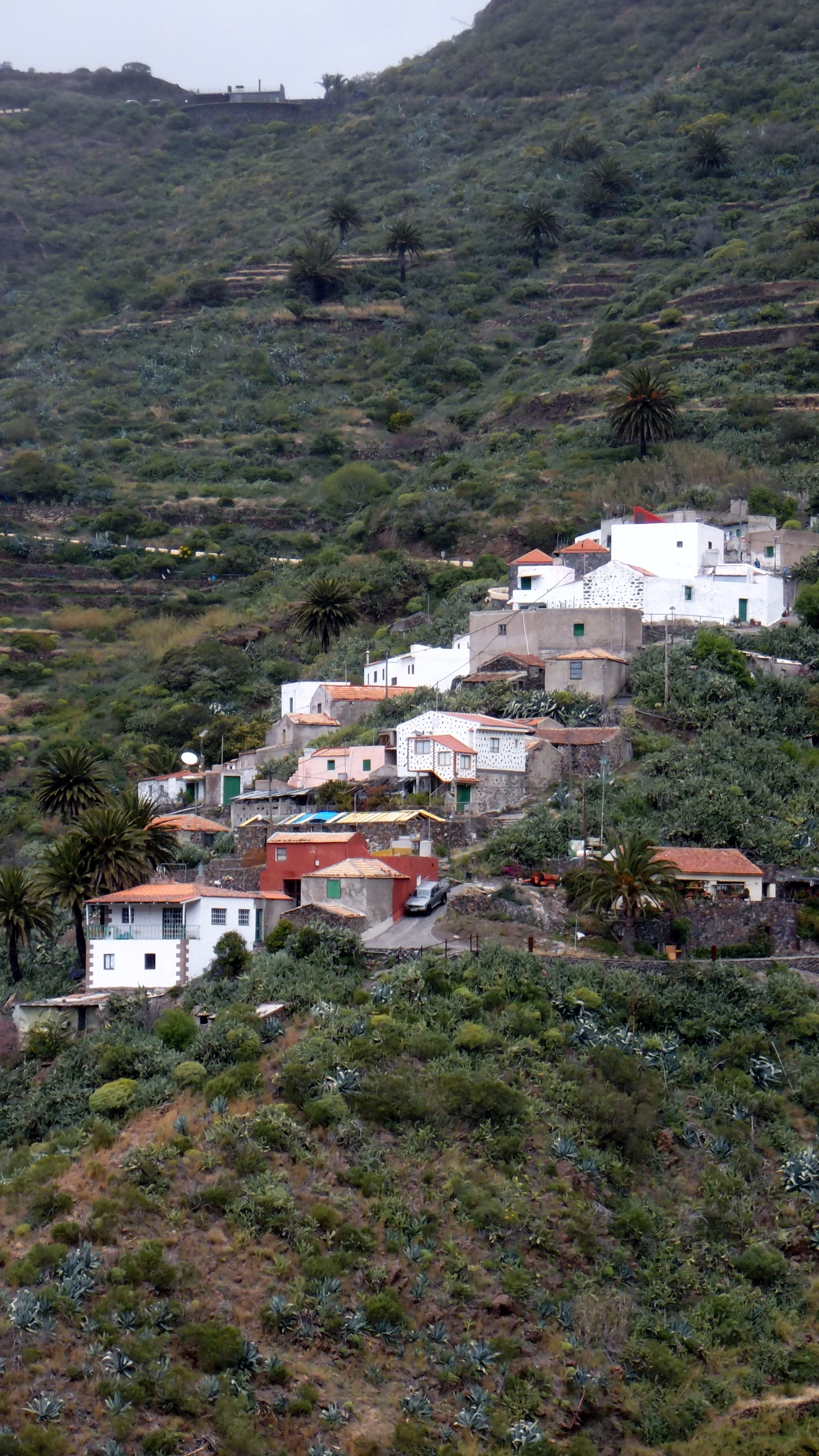
Looking west to Casa Abuela Tina en Masca (top) where Slater was last seen alive

After the report of Slater's disappearance, an extensive search headed by the Guardia Civil commenced, involving drones, sniffer dogs and helicopters. The Asociación SOS Desaparecidos classed Slater as "highly vulnerable".

On 19 June, the search was temporarily moved to the Los Cristianos area due to a potential lead, but this was disregarded and the search returned north to his last known location at the Teno Nature Reserve. Local Guardia Civil and rescuers also searched a 600-metre-deep (2,000 ft) ravine in the Teno Nature Reserve.

The search for Slater was initially focused on two British men he had made friends with in Tenerife three days before his disappearance. Slater left Playa de las Américas in a car with the men, who drove him 35 km (22 mi) north to an Airbnb in Masca. However, police later confirmed that they were "not relevant" to the search after being questioned briefly by Spanish police and flew back to the UK. On 24 June, a blurry CCTV image taken in Santiago del Teide was shared by Slater's family, who they believed was him around ten hours after he was reported missing.

The next day, police officers looking for Slater stumbled across a Scottish hiker in a ravine. The 51-year-old was reported missing on 21 June after failing to return from a hike near where Slater was last seen. Officers stated that he would not have managed to get out of the ravine "by his own means" due to the "difficulty and lack of communication" in the area, but the hiker stated that he was experienced and did not need rescuing.

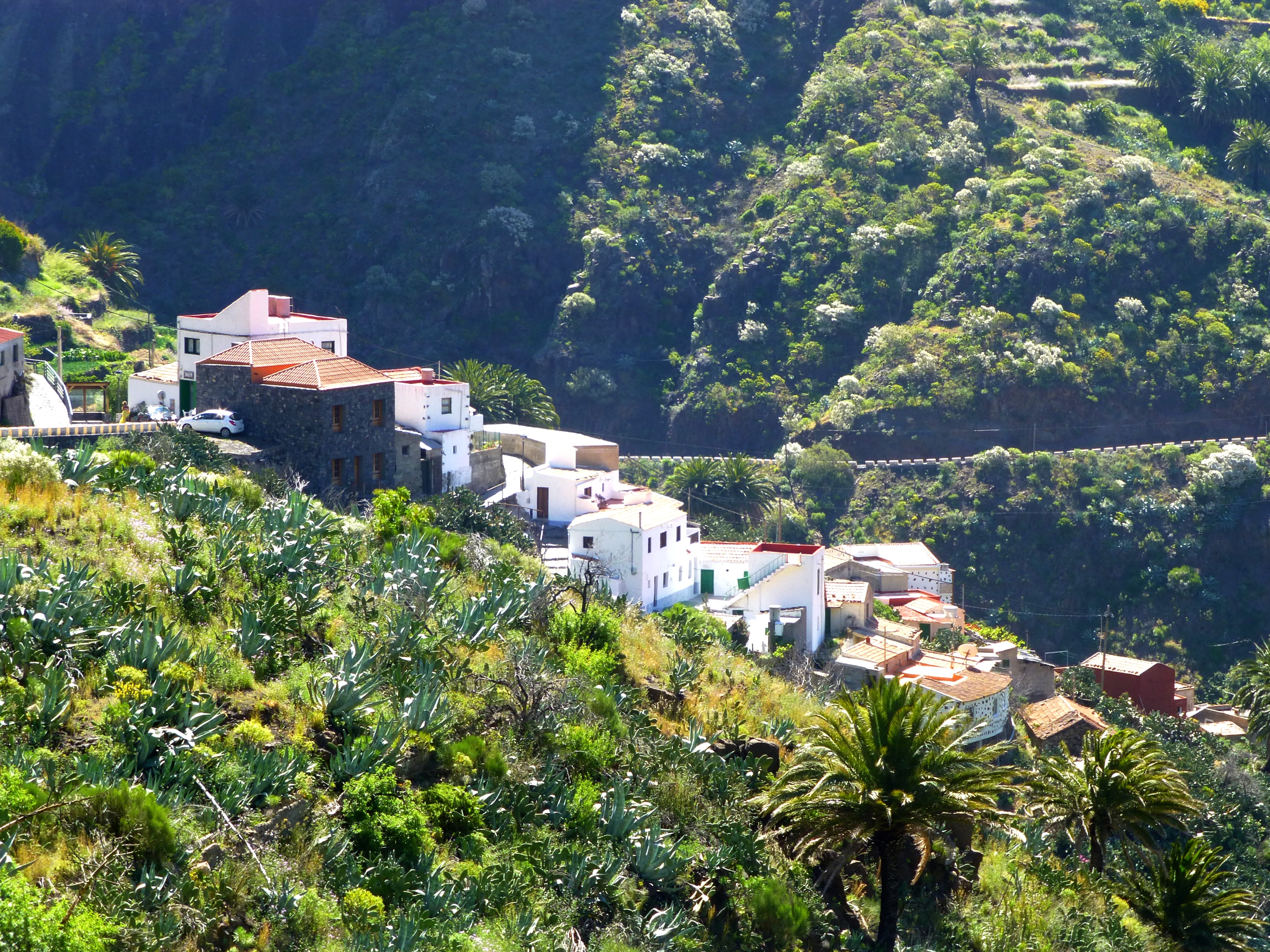
Looking east to Casa Abuela Tina (top left)

Comprehensive searches, involving specialist dogs drafted in from Madrid, found no trace of Slater. On 29 June, the Guardia Civil stepped up their search, urging volunteer associations to take part. Despite the efforts of between 30 and 40 volunteers and rescue workers in the Masca and surrounding areas, nothing of interest was found. The next day, on 30 June, it was claimed the search for Slater was discontinued by the Guardia Civil. The search continued under a court order of secrecy, to avoid "curious onlookers" due to the high level of interest in the case.

The local police declined to state whether it was actively investigating if Slater's disappearance was linked to a parallel investigation. On 2 July, they stated there was no indication Slater had been the victim of a crime. On 14 July, a specialist team of six volunteers and four dogs based in the Netherlands were deployed to the island, mounting a new search for Slater and said "there is more we can do".

== Discovery of body ==
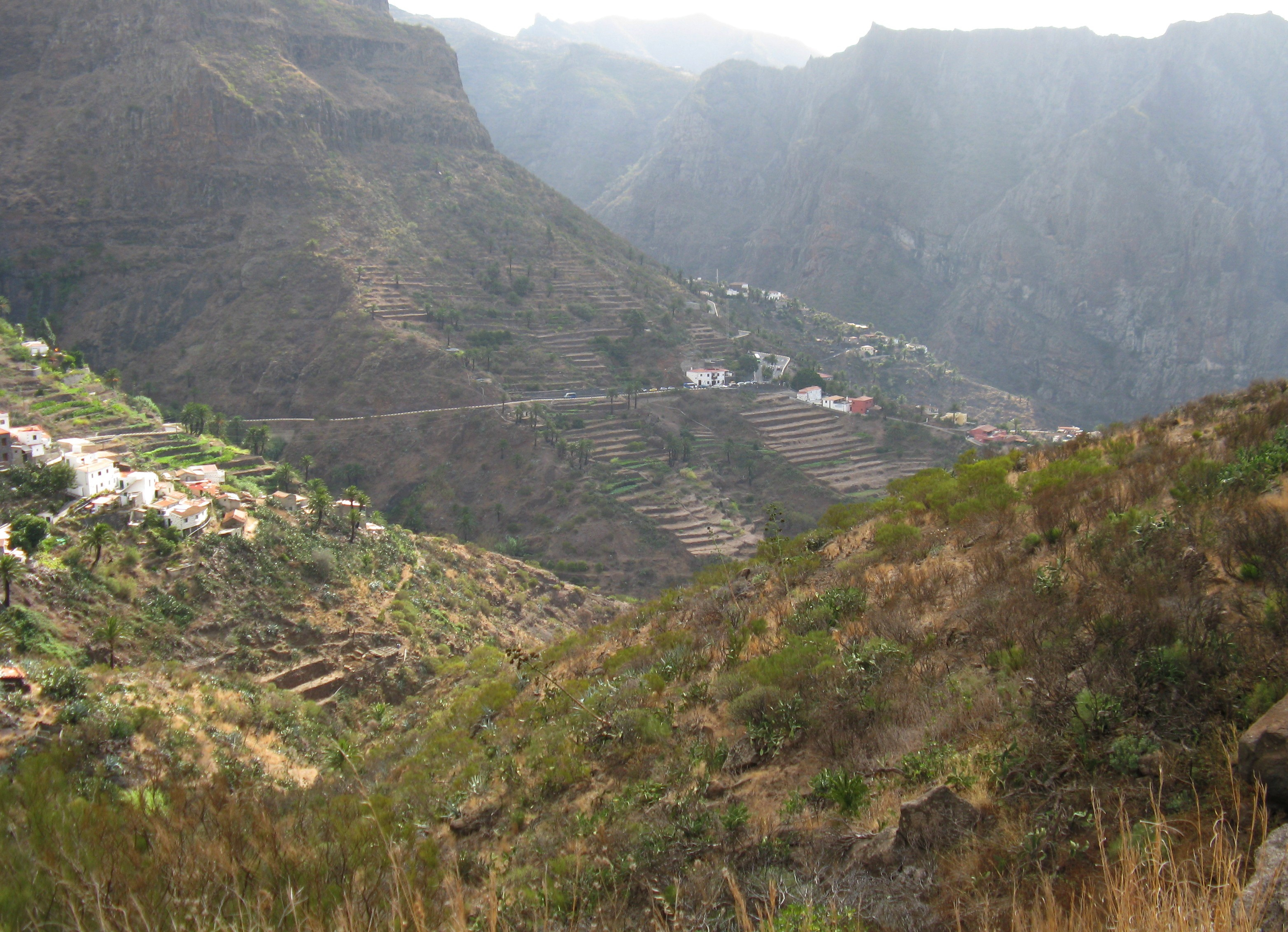
Mountainous terrain around Masca

On 15 July, the Spanish police reported the discovery of human remains in the vicinity of the area of interest, close to the last known location of Slater's mobile phone. This was the Juan López ravine, some 10 km from the coast. The body was found with Slater's possessions and clothes. Tenerife newspaper El Día reported that a helicopter from the regional government's emergency rescue service was used to help recover the remains due to the inaccessible terrain.

The next day, a preliminary autopsy by the Guardia Civil and the Canary Islands Higher Court of Justice confirmed the body found in the area was that of Slater through DNA fingerprinting. The body had shown advanced decomposition due to being exposed to the elements in the hot climate for several weeks. The autopsy proposed that he died as a result of injuries from an accidental fall or a "plunge from height due to the broken bones he suffered".

His body remained in Spain before being repatriated to the UK. The coroner ordered a post-mortem examination to be held in the UK, which concluded Slater died of traumatic head injuries, consistent with a fall from height. The report also highlighted that his death would have been instantaneous.

== Responses ==
The disappearance of Slater sparked national and international attention, which dominated the global media. The attention of Slater's disappearance has been compared to that of Madeleine McCann in 2007.

On 18 June, Slater's mother, Debbie Duncan, and his brother, Zak, flew to Tenerife. Duncan said she believed Slater had been "taken against his will". Slater's father, Warren, stated he was experiencing "a living hell" and that "somebody must know something". Former Metropolitan Police officer Mark Williams-Thomas, who helped in the search for Nicola Bulley, had reached out to Duncan to offer assistance.

On 22 June, organizers of the New Rave Generation Music Festival, which Slater attended before his disappearance, released a statement describing the situation as "devastating".

Slater's disappearance led to some press reporting of the disappearance of Kevin Ainley twenty years previously. Ainley was from Lancashire, living in Yorkshire and had relocated to south Tenerife a few months before his disappearance in June 2004 which was not widely reported at the time. Another comparable case was that of Steven Cook who went missing in Crete but was found dead with an inquest recording an open verdict. On 20 July, the sustained interest in Slater was contrasted with the disappearance of Damien Nettles and Jack O'Sullivan.

Tenerife newspaper El Día reported that according to missing persons organisation SOS Desaparecidos, Slater was one of 82 missing people in the Canary Islands, dating back to 1981, with 50 on Tenerife alone, including 22 foreigners. Figures from Spain's Interior Ministry revealed that Slater's was one of 27 unsolved missing persons cases from 2008 onwards.

Then-Foreign Secretary, David Cameron, stated that the British government were doing all they could to support the search for Slater. Following the confirmed death, the local Member of Parliament, Sarah Smith, said that she was assisting the family in getting government support.

A documentary produced by ITN, The Jay Slater Mystery: Missing or Murdered?, was set to air on Channel 5 in July, but was later removed from its schedules after Slater's body was found.

=== Social media ===
A GoFundMe page entitled 'Get Jay Slater Home' was launched to help raise funds for his family. Following the start of the fundraiser, GoFundMe published a statement, with a spokesperson saying "all campaigns are under review and no money will be transferred unless we can verify it goes straight to his family". This came after widespread online speculation about the intention of how the money would be used. The administrator of a Facebook group set up to help the search said the funds raised would go to Slater's friends and family staying in Tenerife. At least seven fake GoFundMe pages were set up in Slater's name, which were later deleted.

On 22 June, the family and friends of Slater feared his Instagram account had been hacked after it was accessed multiple times since his disappearance. Slater's mother was later subjected to a series of messages on social media and received "sickening" prank calls from unknown numbers claiming they had taken Slater and were holding him for ransom. She later described being "terrorised" by the internet trolls, stating the abuse had not stopped even after Slater's funeral and denied rumours he had stolen a £12,000 Rolex watch before his disappearance.

As with the death of Nicola Bulley, a number of conspiracy theories were posted on social media regarding Slater's disappearance, often based on unconfirmed rumours and false screenshots of messages online from people connected to the case. On Facebook, a number of groups were set up discussing theories about his whereabouts. On TikTok, over 30 million videos were made under the tag "Jay Slater Opinions", many of which were speculation that Slater was tricking everyone for money. TikTok users had also arrived in Tenerife to help with the search and post updates to their followers. Slater's uncle feared third-party involvement. Some social media users who engaged in trolling were strongly criticised. Ginger Gorman, author of Troll Hunting and global cyberhate expert, said it gives trolls targeting Slater's family a feeling of power and was depressing but not surprising in respect of Slater. Another author of a book on social media, Sara Polak, described it as apophenia and said that it fits in with the cultural trope that 19-year-old boys are not to be trusted. Amazon was criticised for allowing various conspiracy theory books to be made available on its website and on Kindle, that detailed on Slater's disappearance.

Labour MPs Sarah Smith and Chris Webb called on UK prime minister Keir Starmer to put tougher sanctions in place to deter online trolls before they get started. Sarah Manavis in the magazine New Statesman cited the case as an example of how "if our true crime culture is not contained now, we will be forever desensitised to stories of personal tragedy", in reference to the conspiracy theories, accusations and mockery that were made about Jay Slater on social media before and after he was found dead.

Matt Searle, CEO of missing persons charity LBT Global, criticised social media users for speculating about Slater, describing them as "armchair detectives" and "so-called experts", as well as urging them to stop. Speaking to BBC News, Searle stated he intended to raise the matter with Home Secretary Yvette Cooper. Ahead of Slater's funeral, Searle stated a number of "heartless" scammers running social media accounts had offered access to a fake live stream of the funeral service in exchange for likes, follows and money.

=== Criticism of police ===
On 21 June, Lancashire Constabulary published a statement regarding Slater's disappearance. It said they had "specialist officers" who were continuing to support Slater's family, and had offered support to the Guardia Civil who rejected it, however, the offer remained open and they would be in contact should their position change. Slater's mother renewed calls for British police to help with the search, adding there had been a "problem with the language barrier".

The Spanish police faced criticism for calling off the search for Slater on 30 June, less than two weeks after his disappearance. Mayor of Santiago del Teide, Emilio Navarro, defended the decision and said police were continuing to investigate several lines of inquiry. Navarro was later criticised for claiming that several witnesses had seen Slater watching a Euro 2024 football match in Tenerife hours after he was last heard from, resulting in local police to investigate the potential sightings, which was later dismissed.

The police were later criticised for its handling of the investigation, with claims that many of the "basics have been overlooked" by the search teams. Former police detective Mark Williams-Thomas, who investigated the disappearance of Nicola Bulley, also criticised the local police for their approach to the investigation and for rejecting help from Lancashire Police in the search for Slater.

=== Tributes and funeral ===
After Slater's disappearance, the Lancashire Post reported that Oswaldtwistle had "turned the streets blue" with hundreds of ribbons. After confirmation of Slater's death, an emotional vigil in memory of him was attended by around 100 people in his native Oswaldtwistle, Lancashire, in which dozens of blue balloons carrying messages were released into the sky. At the West End Methodist Church, a special memorial service was held where people were invited to light a candle for Slater and sign a book of condolence.

The headteachers of West End Primary School and Rhyddings High School paid tribute to their former pupil, stating "all members of the school communities, both past and present, share in our condolences". The Accrington and Rossendale College, where Slater was studying as an apprentice bricklayer, said it was "deeply saddened" to hear the news of his death, describing him as a "hard-working apprentice with a very bright future ahead of him".

The funeral of Slater was held on 10 August, attended by up to 500 people. Slater's family had said his funeral service would be a "celebration" of his life. Mourners attending were asked to wear something blue in his memory. The service heard Slater "touched the lives of so many people", as memories of his junior football achievements at Huncoat United were shared by its manager who described Slater as a "natural footballer" who "always played with a smile on his face". He was remembered as a "loving son", a "cherished brother" and "a loyal friend to many".

== Inquest ==
An inquest into Slater's death began in May 2025 at Preston Coroner's Court, overseen by senior coroner James Adeley, who had also presided over the Nicola Bulley case. Several of Slater's friends, who were holidaying with him in Tenerife, failed to attend as witnesses. Toxicology reports presented at the hearing found Slater's body had traces of alcohol, MDMA, cocaine, and ketamine. The court heard he had sent Snapchat videos to friends that morning – one filmed in the back of a car heading to an Airbnb in Masca, and another capturing mountain views between 05:50 and 07:20 on 17 June, the day he went missing. Medical experts confirmed Slater died from a head injury consistent with a fall, with no signs of assault, restraint, or suggestion he was "under any threat from anybody". After an adjournment, the inquest resumed on 24 July and concluded the next day. The inquest found that it was estimated he fell 20 to 25 metres (66 to 82 ft), causing fractures to his skull and pelvis. Adeley ruled Slater's death accidental, with no evidence of third-party involvement.

== See also ==
- List of solved missing person cases (2020s)
