= Los Gigantes =

Los Gigantes The Giants
- Town
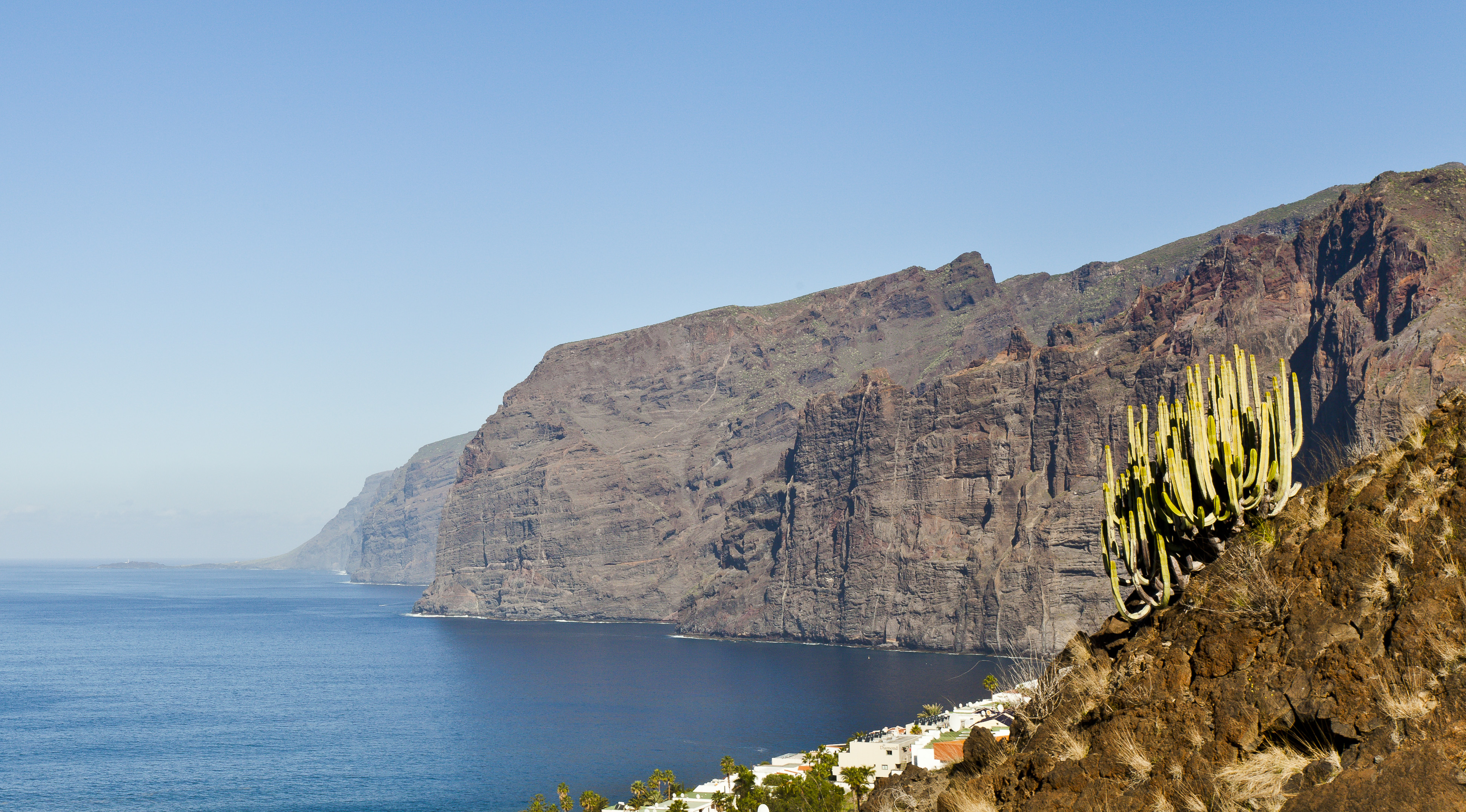
- The town and harbour seen from the cliffs

- Location within the Canary Islands Location within the Province of Santa Cruz de Tenerife
- Coordinates: 28°14′38″N 16°50′25″W
- Country: Spain
- Canary Island: Tenerife
- Municipality: Santiago del Teide
- Website: Los Gigantes.com website

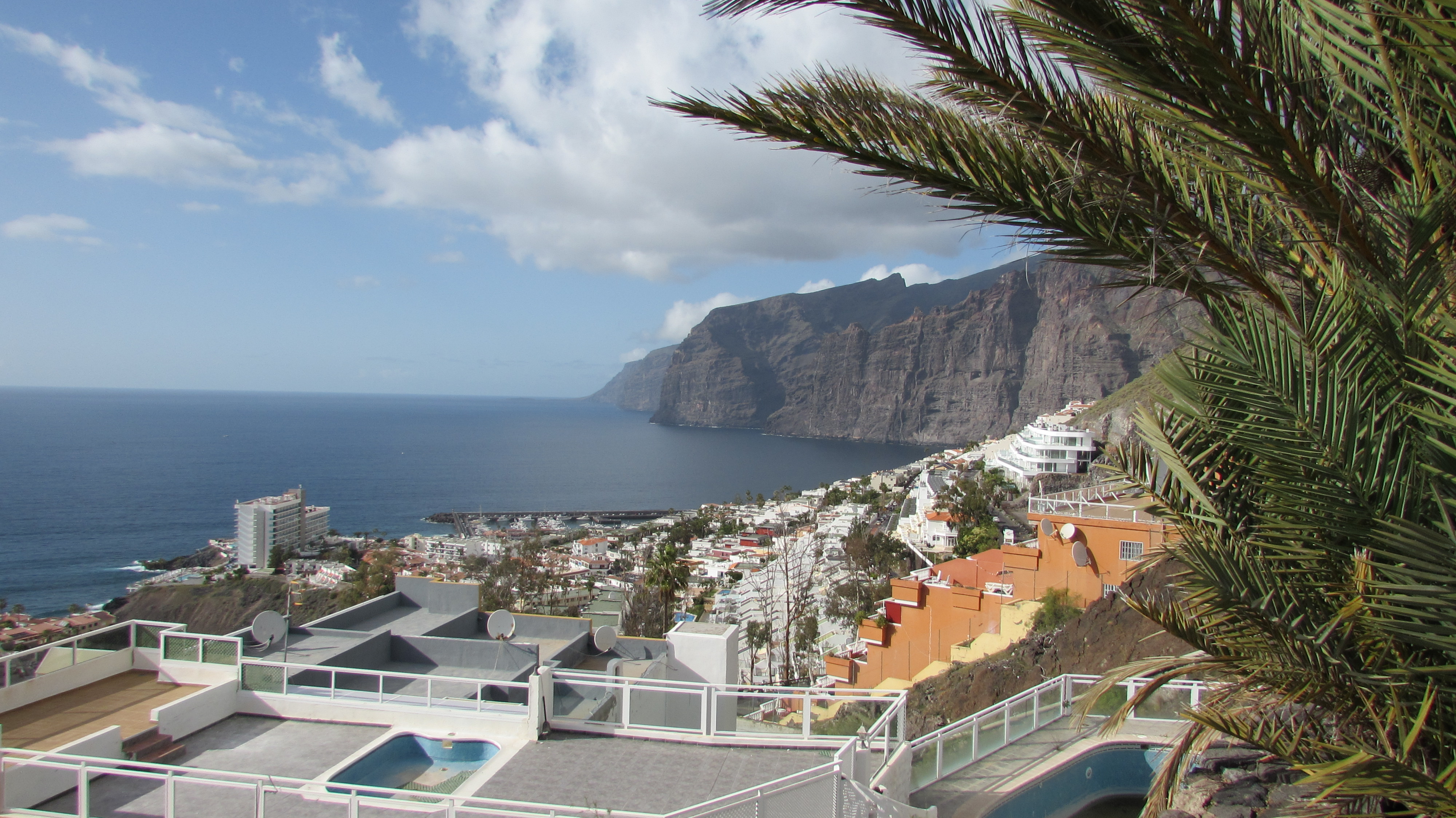
View of Los Gigantes from above

Los Gigantes is a resort town in the Santiago del Teide municipality on the west coast of the Canary Island Tenerife. Its main feature are the giant rock formations, Acantilados de Los Gigantes, that rise from the sea to a height of 500–800 metres (1,640–2,625 ft) after which the town has been named. Los Gigantes means "The Giants".

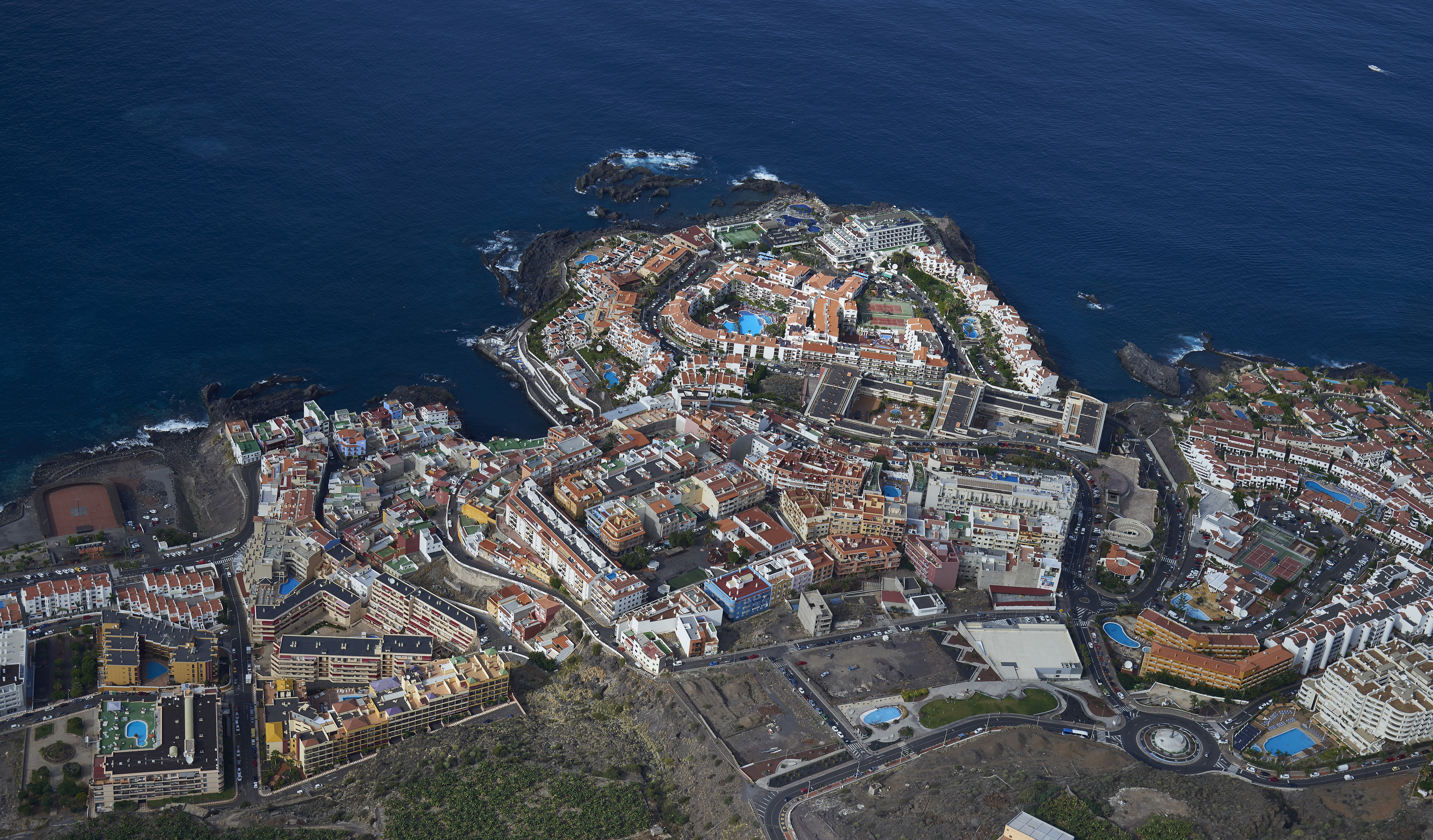
Aerial photo of Los Gigantes

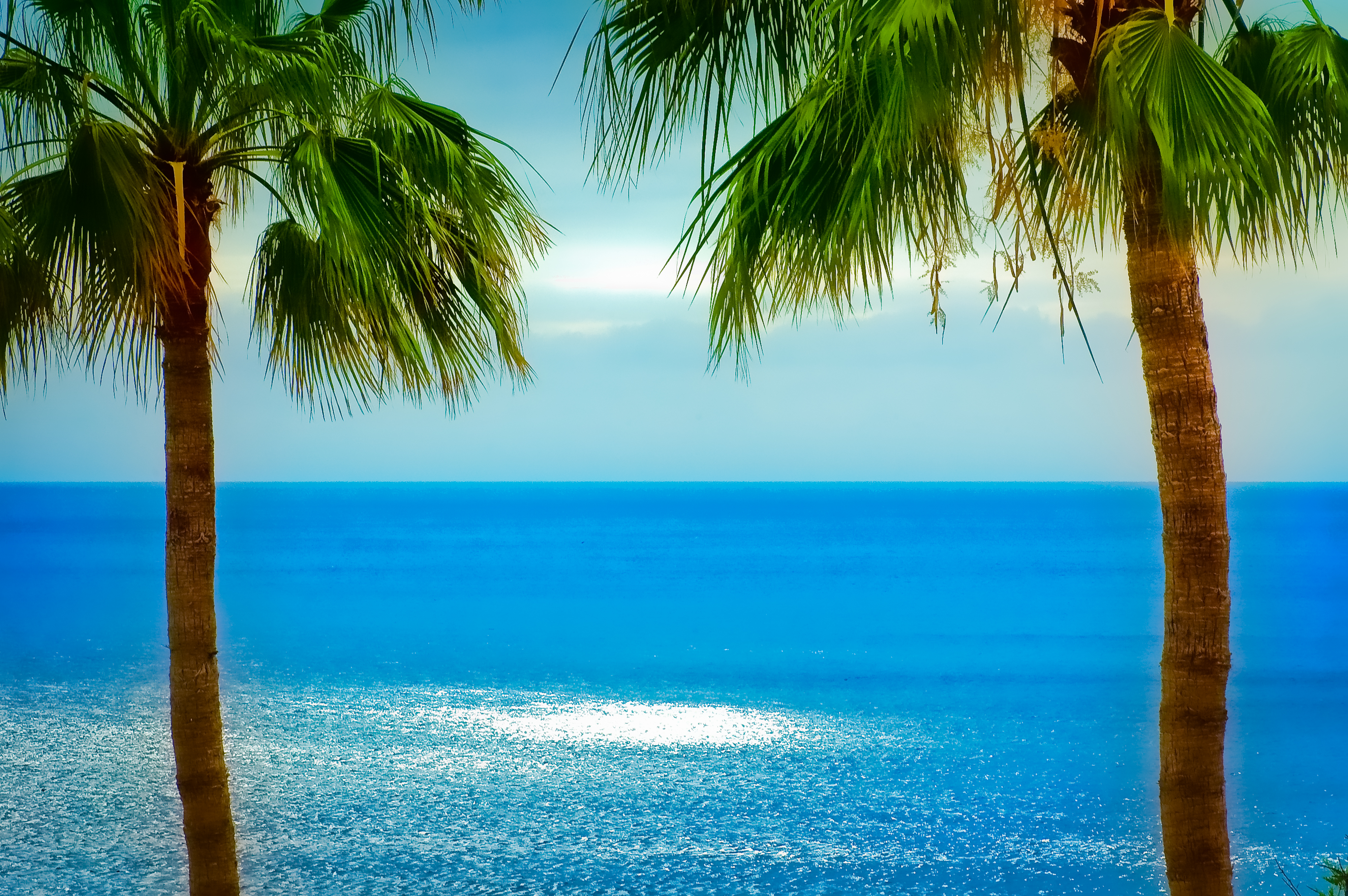
View from Los Gigantes

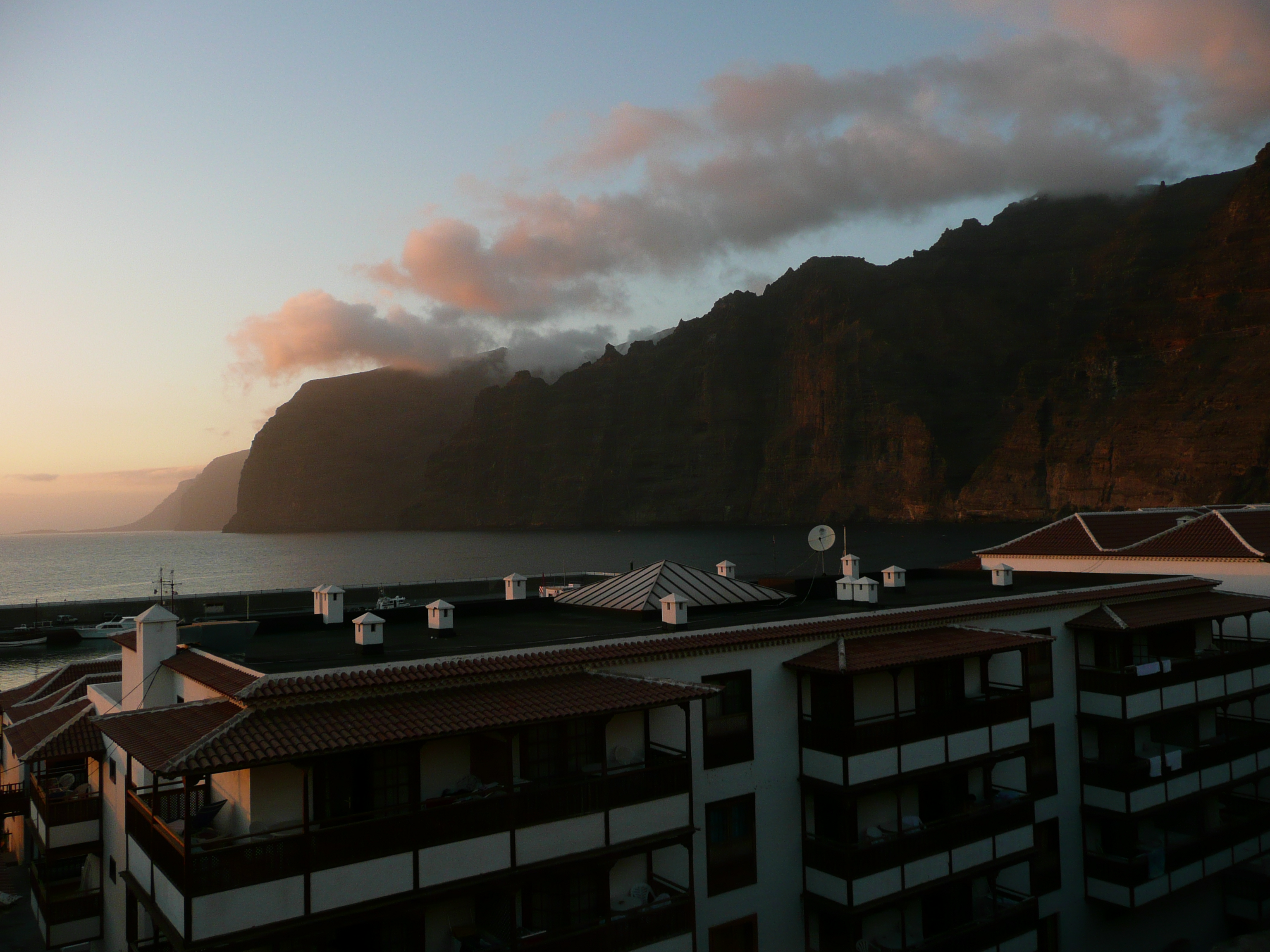
The sun setting over Los Gigantes

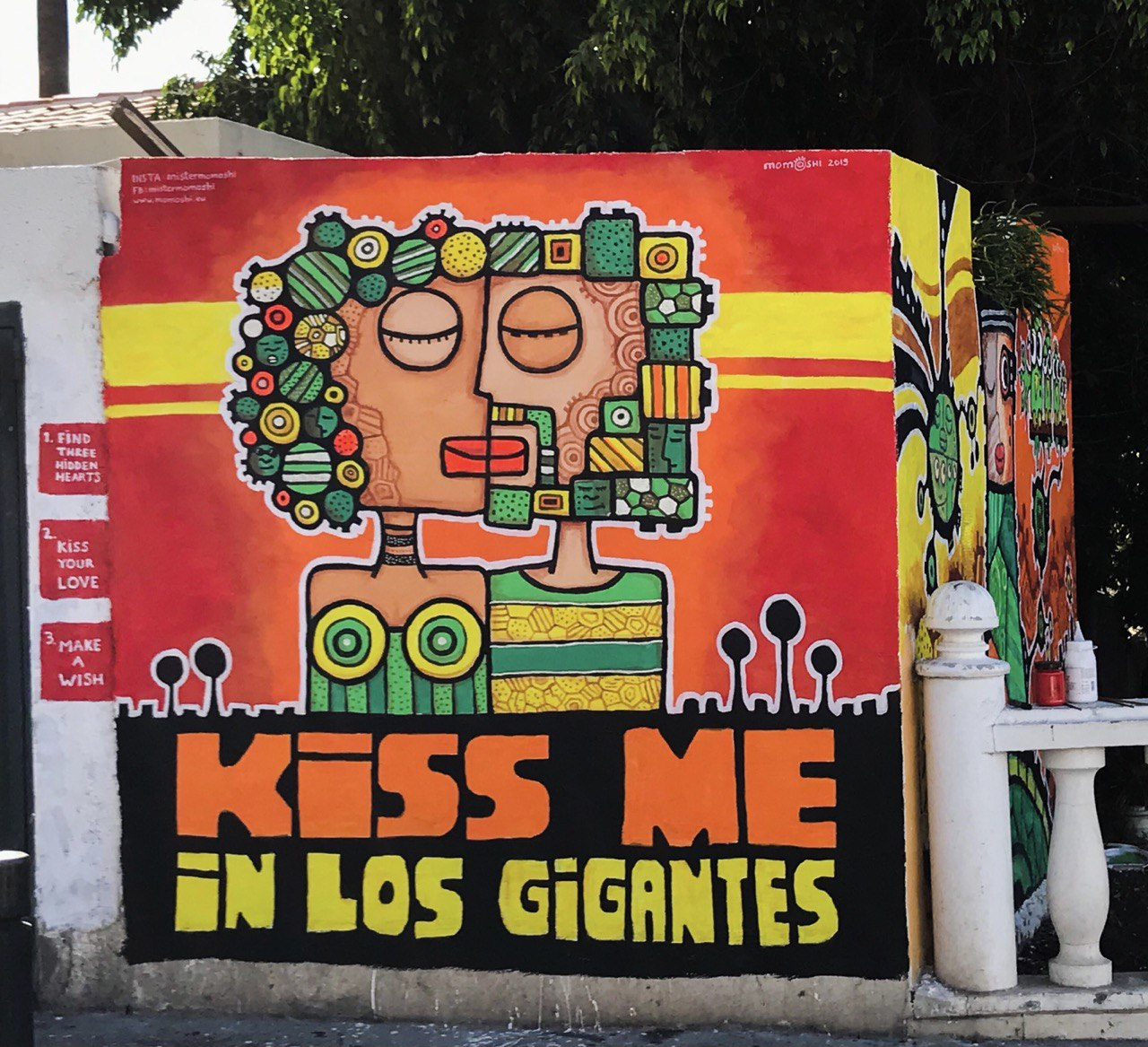
Interactive Mural, lucky charm for lovers

Nearby to the south are the resorts of Puerto de Santiago and Playa de la Arena. Three kilometres (1.9 mi) to the north is the village of Masca which can be reached by boat or car.

The town has a marina surrounded by concrete walls to dampen the effect of the rough seas around the area. A small black sand beach lies between the rocks and the marina. The marina has a boulevard with many restaurants. Near the harbour is a lido.

The cliffs at Los Gigantes, Acantilados de Los Gigantes in Spanish, are one of the island's major tourist attractions. There are three viewpoints in the village, the main one on main road to towards Tamaimo, another above the sports club and a third on a coastal path around the Hotel Barcelo. The village has many small shops and restaurants servicing the tourists that visit the area, especially on the one-way road loop around church and plaza, and also near to the marina and beach.

Each year, in February, there is a carnival which parades through the village. As can be expected of a town resort, Los Gigantes has only one hotel but many apartments compared to regular residences.

== Demographics ==
Population for Los Gigantes, Tenerife

Year	Pop.	±%
2000	2,134	—
2001	2,194	+2.8%
2002	2,398	+9.3%
2003	2,493	+4.0%
2004	2,536	+1.7%

Year	Pop.	±%
2005	2,581	+1.8%
2006	2,617	+1.4%
2007	2,640	+0.9%
2008	2,692	+2.0%
2009	2,721	+1.1%

== Notable residents ==
- Hans Henning Atrott, German philosopher, born 1944

== See also ==
- White Cliffs of Dover in the United Kingdom
- Cliffs of Moher in Ireland
- Cabo Girão on Madeira
