= Lucy Harris (politician) =

British Conservative Party politician and advisor (born 1990)

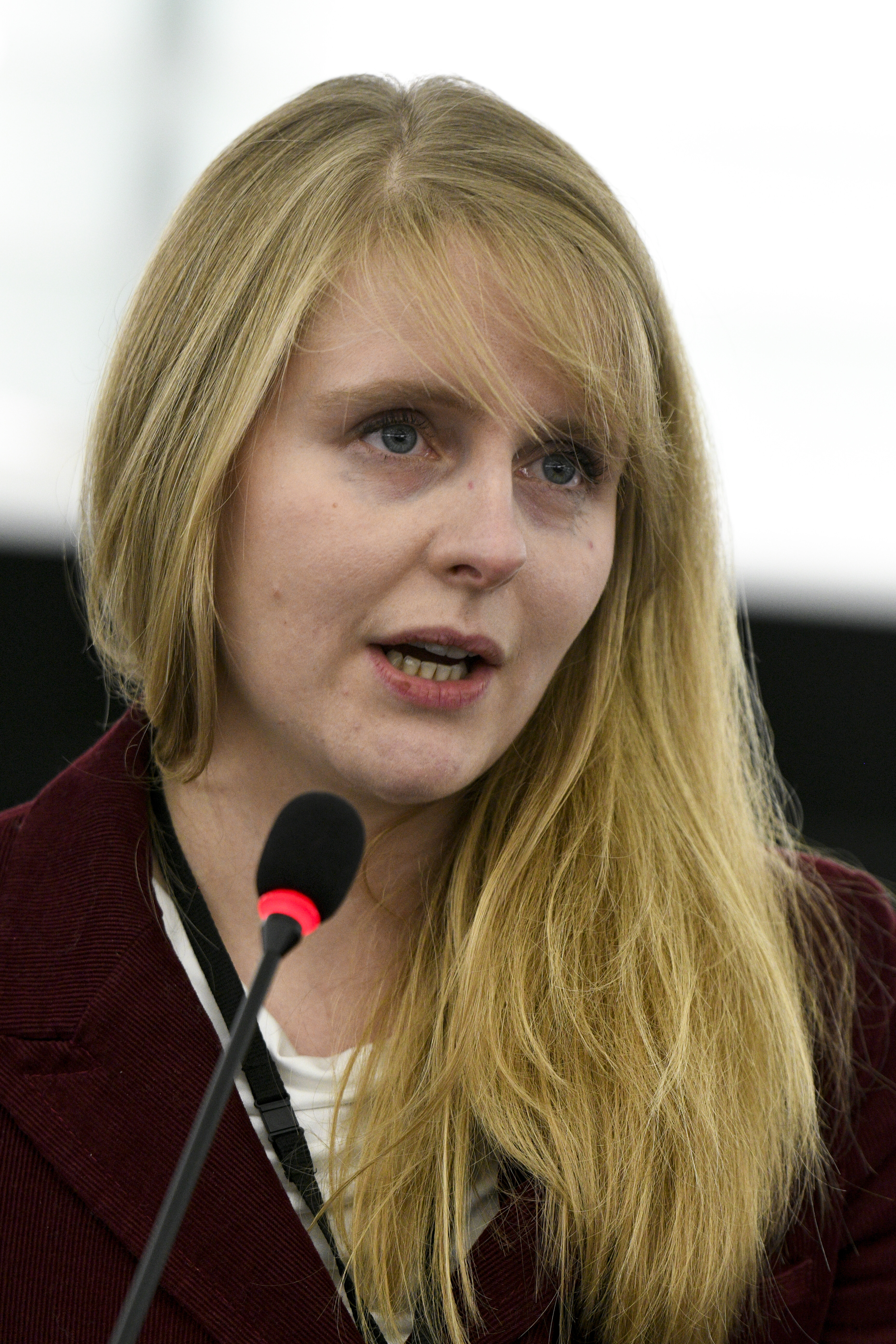
- Harris in 2019

Member of the European Parliament for Yorkshire and the Humber
- In office 2 July 2019 – 31 January 2020
- Preceded by: Linda McAvan
- Succeeded by: Constituency abolished

Personal details
- Born: 19 October 1990 (age 35) Ipswich, Suffolk, England
- Party: Conservative (since 2020)
- Other political affiliations: Independent (2019–2020); Brexit (2019)
- Education: City, University of London; University College London
- Occupation: Politician

Lucy Elizabeth Harris (born 19 October 1990) is a former British Conservative Party politician and advisor. She was elected as a Brexit Party Member of the European Parliament (MEP) for the Yorkshire and the Humber constituency in the 2019 European parliamentary election. She held this role until the United Kingdom's withdrawal from the EU. Prior to her political career, she worked in publishing as a corporate communications executive for The Quarto Group, and later the Greater London Authority.

== Early life and career ==
Harris was born on 19 October 1990 in Ipswich, Suffolk. She grew up in Suffolk and received her early education at Farlingaye High School in Woodbridge, Suffolk, where she was part of the senior choir. Harris moved to Italy in 2010 after successfully applying for financial support from the European Union's Erasmus Programme to study abroad. Over the next two years, she lived in Turin and then Rome, where she studied singing and taught herself Italian. She studied classical singing at the Guildhall School of Music and Drama and City, University of London, graduating in 2014, and completed a master's degree in Publishing at University College London in the following year. Harris has worked as a corporate communications executive for The Quarto Group, and as a press officer for the GLA Conservatives. She has also performed solo soprano at the Royal Albert Hall.

== Political career ==
Harris voted for Brexit in the 2016 United Kingdom European Union membership referendum and said that this was the first time that she had voted for anything, as she felt that the EU was undemocratic and corrupt. In November 2018, she founded Leavers of Britain, a social club for Brexit supporters in the United Kingdom. Harris created the club as a safe space for Brexit supporters who she felt were being vilified for their views; she previously claimed to have been vilified by a fellow commuter on the Tube, who allegedly labelled her "stupid" and "racist" because she was carrying a bag with an anti-EU slogan. Harris has written pro-Brexit articles for the British internet magazine Spiked.

She stood as a candidate for the Brexit Party in the 2019 European parliamentary election. She was second on her party's list, and was elected as one of three of its MEPs for the Yorkshire and Humber constituency. In a BBC Radio 5 Live interview prior to the EU parliamentary elections, Harris suggested that leaving the EU would have a "short-term" negative effect on the economy, which she estimated to last for "30 years" but that it was a cost worth paying for regaining sovereignty and democracy. She was a member of the Committee on International Trade, and was part of the delegation to the EU–Chile Joint Parliamentary Committee in the European Parliament.

On 5 December 2019, Harris resigned her party's whip and became an independent MEP to support the Conservative Party in the December general election. Harris later became a Conservative MEP in January 2020, and held this role until the United Kingdom's withdrawal from the EU in the same month. She was a special adviser in the Department for Levelling Up, Housing and Communities in 2022; as of March 2023, she no longer held this role.

== Post-political career ==
In January 2026, Harris was hired as a senior adviser by communications firm Weber Shandwick to "help guide clients in the era of populist politics".

== Personal life ==
Harris has been in a relationship with former special adviser Hugh Bennett since 2019. They became engaged in December 2022.
