= Disappearance of Luke Durbin =

English disappearance case

Luke Durbin
- Photograph of Luke widely circulated in the wake of his disappearance and used for his missing poster by the charity Missing People.
- Born: 4 December 1986
- Disappeared: 12 May 2006 (aged 19); Ipswich, Suffolk, England
- Status: Missing for 20 years, 5 months and 18 days
- Education: Farlingaye High School
- Height: 5 ft 10 in (1.78 m)
- Mother: Nicki Durbin
- Relatives: Alicia Durbin (sister)

Luke Durbin (born 4 December 1986) disappeared during the early hours on Friday 12 May 2006 from Ipswich, Suffolk. Durbin vanished after a night out with friends and was reported missing by his mother on the afternoon of Saturday 13 May 2006.

== Background ==
Durbin lived with his mother, Nicki and sister Alicia in Hollesley, Suffolk, both of whom he shared a close relationship with. An avid guitarist, he enrolled in a music technology course at a college in Colchester, Essex, although he dropped out after a year due to issues with the daily commute. Durbin then worked periodical jobs over the next year, until acquiring a job at a greengrocer in Aldeburgh, a month and a half before his disappearance. Durbin has been described as easygoing and affectionate, often bringing back groceries to cook for his mother and sister.

His family stated his disappearance was uncharacteristic, having always been communicative over his whereabouts.

== Disappearance ==
1 04:00 Zebra crossing to bus station, Dogs Head Street location of last confirmed sighting of Luke Durbin.

Durbin's friend Alex, a chef in London, had returned for the weekend to see friends and family, prompting Durbin to take time off work alongside another friend, Zach. Durbin rode his new motorbike to Alex's place in Woodbridge, planning to spend the night. At Alex's home he left his motorbike, as well as his wallet, keys, phone and a change of clothes. Durbin wore a black/grey long-sleeved collared shirt under a reversible plum-grey sweatshirt, alongside faded denim jeans with a motif on the side thigh, and brown suede shoes.

After some drinks at a local pub, Durbin, Alex and Zach then took a cab from Woodbridge to Ipswich to go clubbing at Zest nightclub, although Alex took a taxi back shortly after having too much to drink. After some hours at Zest nightclub, Durbin lost contact with Zach after the latter went to purchase drinks.

Durbin was reported at Ipswich train station, a 5-minute walk from Zest nightclub, at around 02:00-03:00 AM BST. After being told no trains were running, Durbin is next spotted on CCTV at around 03:45 AM BST heading to Hawk Express Cabs. Having left his wallet at Alex's place, the receptionist suggested Durbin call his mother for her bank card details. He refused, stating he did not wish to wake her.

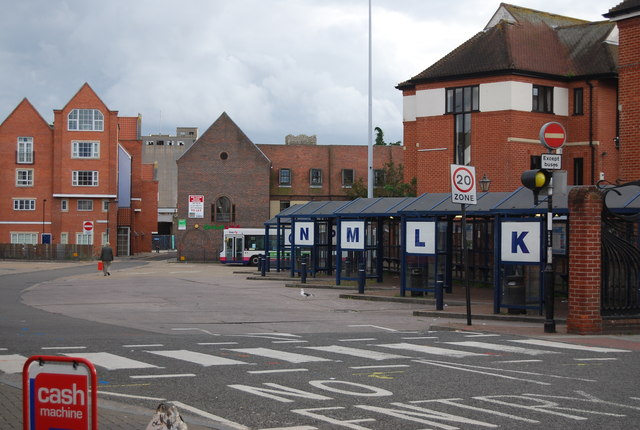
Zebra crossing to bus station, location of last confirmed sighting of Durbin

Durbin is then spotted on CCTV walking across the zebra crossing on Dogs Head Street, headed towards the bus station, at 04:00 AM. This is the last positive sighting of Durbin. Shortly after, a silver or white Volvo 440 is caught on CCTV with registration 'M206 LYE', later discovered to be false plates. The vehicle is of primary interest to investigators.

The next day, Durbin's family assumed he had gone to work, although after contacting friends and his work over his whereabouts, he was reported missing by his mother.

== Unconfirmed sightings ==
A witness reported seeing an individual matching Durbin's description walking near Foxhall Stadium in Ipswich on 12 May 2006 between 7:30-8:00 AM. This lead was reinvestigated in mid-late 2011 but failed to produce new evidence.

On 13 May 2006, between 11:00 AM to 2:00 PM, two witnesses reported seeing Durbin in a dark blue Renault Mégane being driven by a man, near the Turban Centre car park in Quayside, Woodbridge.

In late March 2007, a classmate of Durbin's from Farlingaye High School reported seeing him outside Aldwych Theatre in Drury Lane, London.

== Subsequent events ==
After a fatal shooting of a patron in December 2006, a police appeal to the Ipswich Borough Council led to a revocation of Zest nightclub's licence, leading to an immediate closure in January 2007. Council members cited the club's reputation for attracting violent criminals and failing to ensure a safe environment as grounds for its closure.

In March 2008, Durbin's mother - alongside Valerie Nettles, mother of missing teen Damien Nettles - organised a 'March for the Missing' event. The event intended to raise awareness over the scale of how many go missing every year in the United Kingdom, in addition to appealing to the government to provide financial support to the Missing People charity.

In August 2011, a 29-year-old man and a 24-year-old woman were arrested for identity fraud after using Luke Durbin's details to make online purchases in August 2007. The pair were questioned but ultimately released.

In June 2012, a 40-year-old man and a 25-year-old were arrested on suspicion of the murder of Durbin. Both were eventually bailed after questioning and a search of their homes.

The LotToDo Theatre Company's December 2012 production 'The Missing' re-enacted Durbin's story based on material from interviews with his family and friends. The production took place at The Etcetera Theatre in Camden, London.

In March 2019, to mark the 25th anniversary of the Missing People charity, artist Ben Moore curated the Unmissable exhibition at The Other Art Fair, located at the Old Truman Brewery in Brick Lane, London. A group of artists commissioned 25 portraits of the missing over the years, with Durbin's portrait painted by artist Ru Knox.

In April 2020, a Channel 5 documentary explored Durbin's drug dealing history and his ties to gangs in Brixton, London. The documentary speculated that Durbin owed money to dealers within his network. According to investigators, after Durbin's shift concluded at the greengrocer, he went on to finalise a drug deal in Woodbridge, before meeting up with Alex and Zach on the night he disappeared.

Suffolk Police have described Durbin's disappearance to be one of their most baffling cases.

== Criticism of investigation ==
Durbin's mother has voiced her criticisms towards the initial police investigation, stating it wasn't taken seriously enough, leading to "grave mistakes" and missing a crucial window in declaring it a murder investigation. Following a review in 2010, the Suffolk Police relaunched Durbin's case as a murder inquiry, referring the case to their Major Investigations Team (MIT).

== See also ==
- List of people who disappeared mysteriously (2000–present)
- Disappearance of Damien Nettles – A teenager who disappeared under somewhat similar circumstances from the Isle of Wight on 2 November 1996.
- Missing People
