= Farlingaye High School =

Location
- Ransom Road; Woodbridge, Suffolk, IP12 4JX; England
- Coordinates: 52°06′02″N 1°18′15″E

Information
- Type: Academy
- Established: 1950s
- Department for Education URN: 136834 Tables
- Ofsted: Reports
- Headteacher: Peter Smith
- Gender: Coeducational
- Age: 11 to 18
- Website: www.farlingaye.suffolk.sch.uk

Farlingaye High School is a co-educational secondary school and sixth form with academy status located in Woodbridge in the English county of Suffolk within East Anglia.

The catchment area for the school draws students from a wide area of nearby countryside, including the entire Sandlings peninsula, as well as the town of Woodbridge.

Upon inspection, the school received an 'outstanding' rating from Ofsted in 2013.

== History ==
Previously a community school administered by Suffolk County Council, Farlingaye High School converted to academy status on 1 July 2011. However the school continues to coordinate with Suffolk County Council for admissions.

The school was first rated outstanding by Ofsted under the leadership of the previous head teacher Sue Hargadon. She was head teacher at Farlingaye for 20 years up until summer 2016, when she retired. Following Hargadon's retirement Dr. Andy Sievewright took over as headteacher. In August 2023 Dr. Sievewright retired with Peter Smith, who had previously served as deputy head, taking over from his role as headteacher.

On 25 January 2018, the school became the 5th school in the UK to become a member of the "Schools: Partners of The Future" (PASCH) initiative, a global network of 2,000 schools which "place a high value on German".

On 1 September 2019, the school partnered with Bungay High School and Kesgrave High School to establish a new multi-academy trust, called East Anglian Schools Trust. Farlingaye is currently the registered office address of the new multi-academy trust.

== Notable Pupils ==
- Milo Parker, actor
- Lucy Harris, politician who was elected as Member of the European Parliament (MEP) for the Yorkshire and the Humber in 2019
- Luke Durbin - alumnus, greengrocer and musician who mysteriously disappeared in the early hours of 12 May 2006.
