= Unsolved: The Boy Who Disappeared =

- Genre: Documentary
- Country of origin: United Kingdom
- No. of seasons: 1
- No. of episodes: 8

Production
- Production location: Cowes
- Running time: 15 minutes

Original release
- Network: BBC Three
- Release: 25 July 2016

External videos
- Unsolved: The Boy Who Disappeared (BBC)

Unsolved: The Boy Who Disappeared is an eight-part documentary series broadcast by online channel BBC Three (available exclusively through iPlayer), with all episodes released simultaneously on 25 July 2016 at 10 am. The series follows the 1996 disappearance of Damien Nettles, a 16-year-old boy who went missing one night on the Isle of Wight. Investigative journalists Bronagh Munro and Alys Harte spent three months looking into the case, speaking to involved parties and analysing evidence. Both reporters had previously worked on flagship BBC current affairs documentary programme Panorama.

Episodes run for 15 minutes each, giving a total run time of approximately 120 minutes. The video episodes are supplemented by a range of other features such as maps, documents and character profiles published on the show's BBC mini-site.

Valerie Nettles, Damien's mother, praised the team for their efforts in the case, having previously been frustrated by progress. She provided the team with a large amount of evidence to assist with their investigation.

The show has been widely compared to the podcast Serial and the Netflix programme Making a Murderer, two hugely successful investigations into purported miscarriages of justice in the USA. In contrast to the cases featured in those shows, no-one has been convicted of any crime associated with Nettles' disappearance. It was one of the anticipated highlights of the early schedule following BBC Three's move to being an online-only channel. Damien Kavanagh, BBC Three controller, said We are innovating with new ways to tell stories at BBC Three and Unsolved is the perfect example of how our move online has opened up new possibilities for storytelling. Harte described the filming as an experimental format for BBC Three with cameras following their every move.
