= Santiago del Teide =

- Municipality
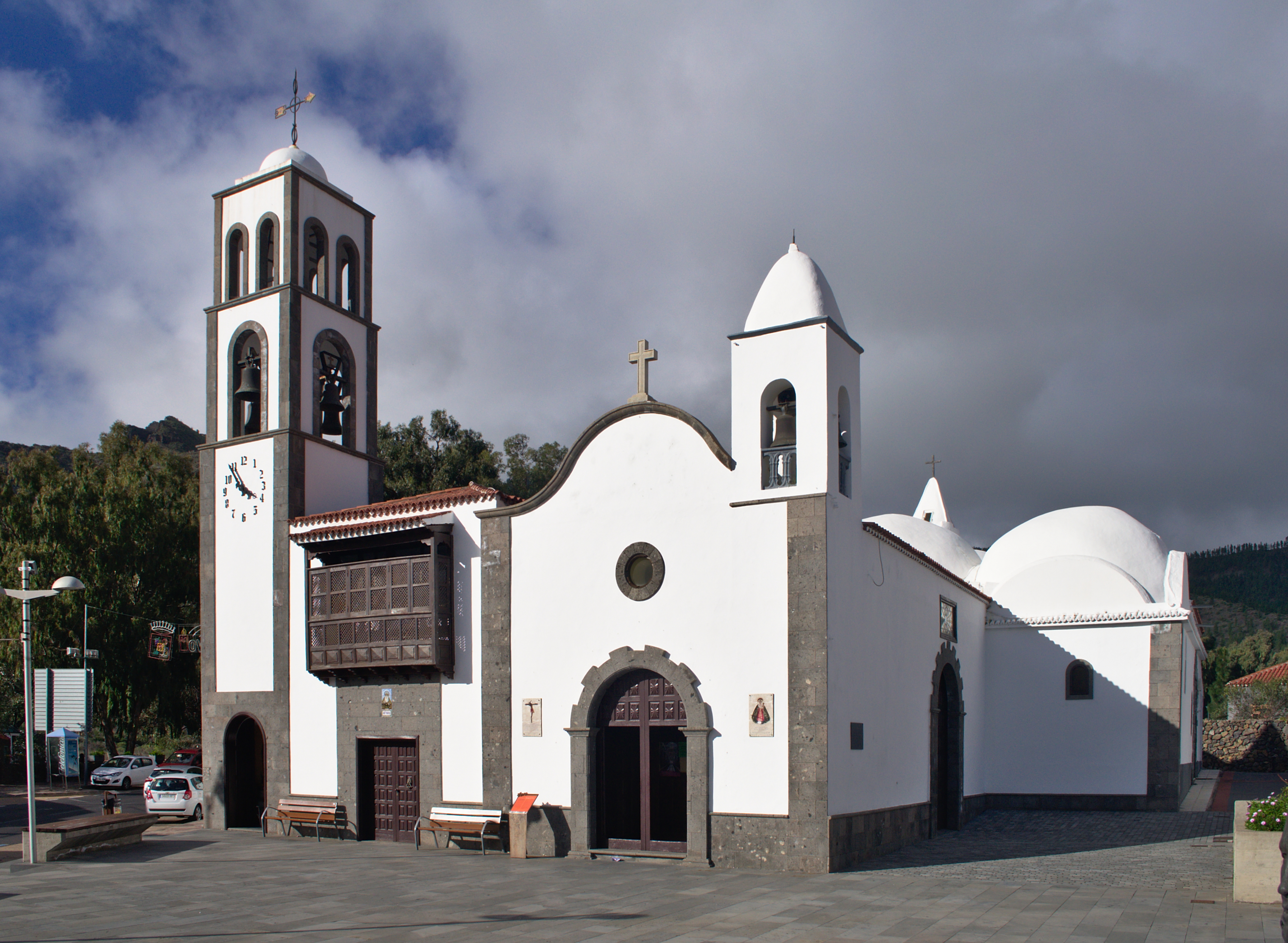

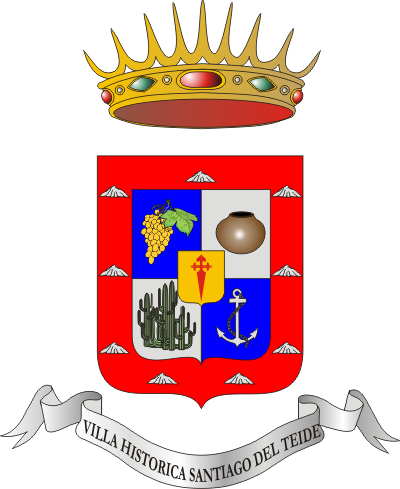
- Flag Coat of arms

- Location in Tenerife

- Location in Province of Santa Cruz de Tenerife Santiago del Teide (Canary Islands) Santiago del Teide (Spain, Canary Islands)
- Coordinates: 28°17′50″N 16°48′50″W
- Country: Spain
- Autonomous Community: Canary Islands
- Province: Tenerife
- Island: Tenerife

Government
  - Mayor: Juan D. Gorrín Ramos (PP)

Area
  - Total: 52.21 km^{2} (20.16 sq mi)
- Elevation (AMSL): 925 m (3,035 ft)

Population (2025-01-01)
  - Total: 12,582
  - Density: 241.0/km^{2} (624.2/sq mi)
- Time zone: UTC+0 (CET)
  - Summer (DST): UTC+1 (CEST (GMT +1))
- Postal code: 38690 / 38683
- Area code: +34 (Spain) + 922 (Tenerife)
- Climate: Csb
- Website: www.santiagodelteide.org

Santiago del Teide is a town and a municipality in the western part of the island Tenerife, Canary Islands, and part of the province of Santa Cruz de Tenerife. The area of the municipality is 52.21 km^{2}, the population is 12,634 (2013). Beach resort towns in the municipality are Los Gigantes, Puerto de Santiago and Playa de la Arena. The steep cliffs Acantilados de Los Gigantes are situated on the coast of the municipality.
