= Acantilados de Los Gigantes =

Cliffs in Spain

Coordinates: 28°17′47″N 16°51′21″W

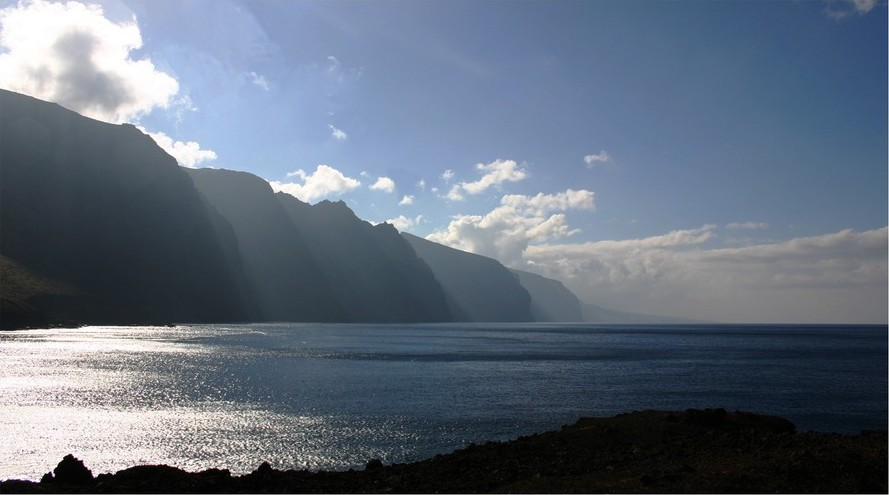
Cliffs of the Giants area, view from the North.

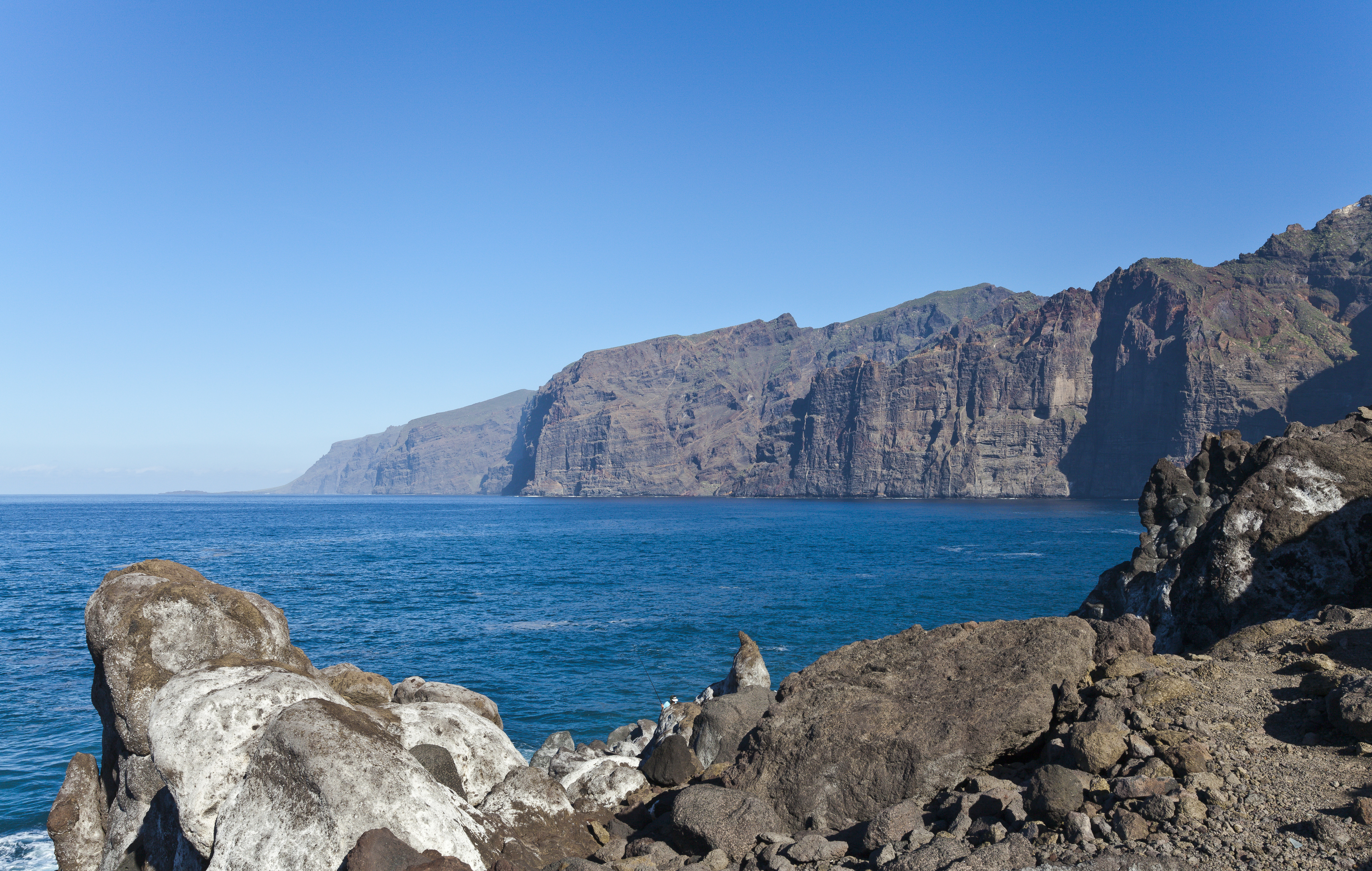
View from the South.

Acantilados de Los Gigantes ("Cliffs of the Giants") are vertical cliffs along the western coast of Tenerife. They are vertical walls reaching heights of 500 metres in some places. They are a basaltic geological feature. In times of the Guanches they were known as the "Wall of Hell" (Muralla del Infierno).

== Tourism ==
The panoramic location and the weather has favored the development of a major tourist resort in recent years. The town of Los Gigantes developed in the 1960s following British investment, with a black sand beach, a marina and a natural pool. Near the village are several tourist resorts such as Playa de La Arena and Puerto de Santiago, etc. This area is 125 km from the island's capital, Santa Cruz de Tenerife and 45 km from the international airport.
