= Disappearance of Damien Nettles =

Unsolved 1996 British missing person case

Damien Nettles
- Born: Damien Richard Nettles; 21 June 1980; Gleneagles Hospital in Singapore
- Disappeared: 2 November 1996 (aged 16); Cowes, England
- Status: Missing for 30 years
- Height: 6 ft 4 in (193 cm)
- Parents: Edward Nettles (father); Valerie Nettles (mother)
- Relatives: Sarah Nettles (sister); Melissa Nettles (sister); James Nettles (brother)

Damien Richard Nettles (born 21 June 1980) disappeared from Cowes on the Isle of Wight on 2 November 1996 at the age of 16 during a night out with a friend. Nothing has been seen of him since. The investigation into his disappearance has been ongoing ever since, with five men arrested in 2011, although no charges have been brought.

== Background ==
Damien Richard Nettles was born 21 June 1980, one of four children of Valerie and Edward Nettles. At the time of his disappearance, he was approximately 6 feet 4 inches (1.93 metres) tall. He was a fan of the rock band Nirvana and was often seen wearing Doc Martens boots.

== Disappearance ==
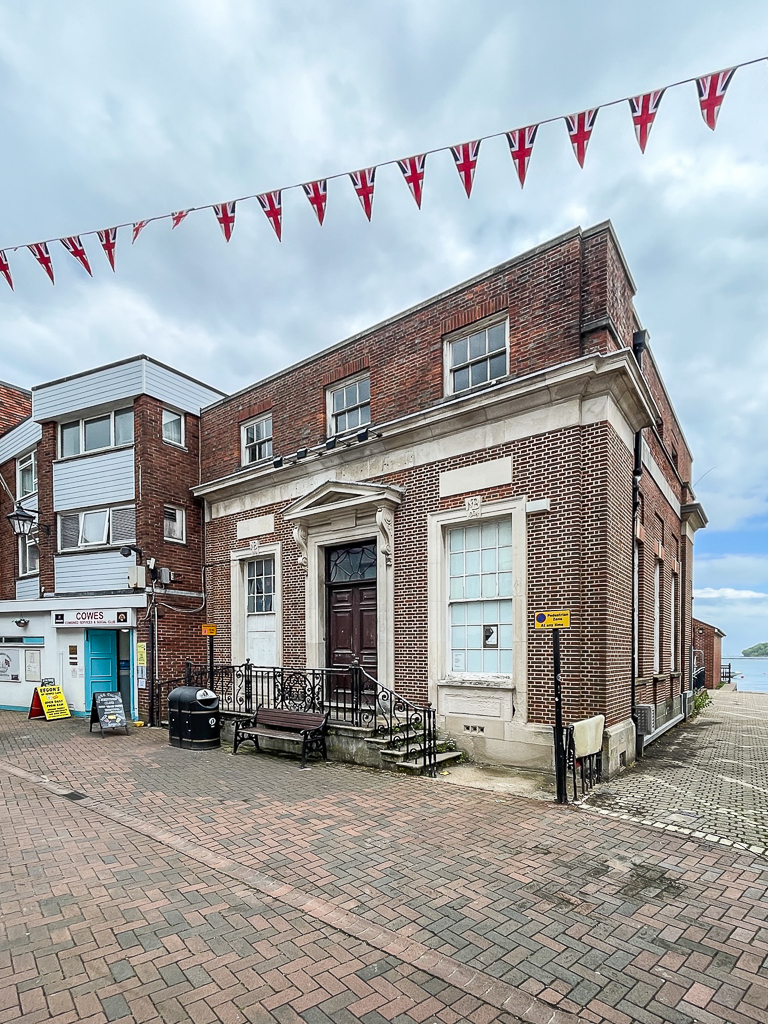
High Street junction with Sun Hill public slipway where Damien was last seen on CCTV around midnight

Locations in the search for Damien Nettles
1 22:00 Damien enters Yorkies chip shop.
2 00:02 Last CCTV location sighting walking alone.

External videos
- YouTube videos
- Yorkies chip shop CCTV

On the night of his disappearance, Nettles was wearing blue jeans and a black fleece jacket. It is believed that he did not take a bag or any personal belongings with him when he left home. Nettles planned to attend a party with his friend Chris Boon, who lived in East Cowes. His father drove him to Boon's house.

Nettles and Boon attended the party but later left to buy cider. Nettles was seen leaving the party carrying a black camera, which has never been found. The pair then travelled to West Cowes by ferry. After returning to West Cowes, Nettles entered Yorkies, a fish and chip shop on the High Street, but left without ordering anything. The friends later made unsuccessful attempts to enter local pubs and parted company at Northwood Park, with Boon returning home. Nettles then returned to the High Street, bought chips from Yorkies, and was later seen walking around the area until midnight.

One witness reported seeing Nettles attempting to open the doors of a blue Ford Fiesta at around 23:15 in the Harbour Lights pub car park. Another witness reported seeing Nettles at a bus stop near a Co-operative Group supermarket. According to the witness, Nettles briefly boarded a bus but got off after speaking with the driver. The witness alleged that Nettles had attempted to photograph the driver with his camera and thanked him as he left the bus.

A third witness in his car stated that a person matching Nettles' description was eating chips while sitting with his arms and legs drawn close to his body. The witness further stated that the individual approached him and said, "They are watching us", before wiping rain from the car window and walking towards the High Street.

== Investigation ==
Several witnesses reported that Nettles appeared intoxicated and possibly confused on the night of his disappearance. It was also alleged that local drug dealer Bunny Iles had sold drugs to him. Nettles' former girlfriend, Abbie Scott, said that she believed there were aspects of his life that he kept secret and suspected that he may have been involved with drugs. Not all witness accounts from the night could be fully verified, as some CCTV footage was reportedly lost by police.

Eight arrests have been made in connection with Nettle's disappearance. In May 2011, five people were arrested on suspicion of murder: a 48-year-old man from Sandown, a 45-year-old person from Cowes, a 50-year-old person from Newport, aged 50, a 37-year-old person from Ryde, and a 40-year-old person from Gravesend, Kent. All were released on bail and no further charges followed. A sixth arrest was made in July 2011 when a 38-year-old man from East Cowes was arrested and later released.

On 1 November 2011, a 44-year-old man and a 35-year-old woman from Cowes were arrested on suspicion of conspiracy to murder following information received by police. Both were questioned in custody and linked to an address in Marsh Road, Gurnard, which was searched by police for evidence relating to the case. They were later released.

On 4 October 2013, Hampshire Constabulary announced a £20,000 reward for information for a period of six months. Despite receiving around 30 pieces of information, the investigation remained unresolved, and the reward was not extended despite appeals from Nettles' family.

On 25 July 2016, the BBC Three series Unsolved: The Boy Who Disappeared, was broadcast and examined the case.

Nettles' family became aware that CCTV footage may have captured him on Cowes High Street. His mother identified him in the footage, which showed him alone, eating, and walking along the street shortly after midnight. The footage was believed to show his last known movements. The footage was subsequently lost by police. In 2005, Nettles' mother complained to the Independent Police Complaints Commission about the loss of the footage and the handling of the investigation. She was informed that the matter involving the officer responsible for the lost tapes had already been dealt with.

It has been claimed that Nettles' mother has conveyed how disheartened she had found herself, because of the police's management of the case. Evidence ended up being misplaced, along with records failing to be kept, hindering any possible progression of the case. The call log made to police on the night of Nettles' disappearance no longer exists, and the records detailing which officers were on duty that night were lost. However, the case remains open. Other criticisms towards the handling of the investigation include requests made to commence searches both on land and air being rejected, and the error made by police who initially listed Nettles (aged 16) as a missing adult rather than a missing child. Members of the public campaigned by protesting and participating in a march. Their aim was to convince police to dig at Parkhurst Forest and Gurnard, as claims were made that Nettles' remains may be buried there. However, police declined this request, as they believed the claims made to them came from untrustworthy sources.

Theories emerged that Nettles fell into the sea following his night out, but his mother dismissed these assumptions. She was convinced he suffered at the hands of a gang. She revealed that in spite of Cowes' upscale reputation, there are people there associated in supplying others with drugs.

In March 2002, Hampshire Constabulary's major crime department was passed the case, and details of the investigation were entered on to the Holmes computer system. It was at this point that an informant, who in the 1990s was connected to a local drug dealer named Nicky McNamara, alleged he told police what happened to Nettles. In 2010, the informant approached Nettles' mother as he felt no action had been taken regarding his claims. She was told by the informant that McNamara got into an altercation with Nettles, resulting in McNamara unintentionally giving Nettles a fatal punch. The informant claimed his body was concealed for three weeks in a drug den, then later buried in Cowes. The police investigated, arranged searches and made arrests after Nettles' mother took the information to them, but they concluded that the informant couldn't be trusted. McNamara died in 2002 of a heroin overdose. It was claimed that McNamara made a deathbed confession regarding his involvement in Nettles' disappearance.

Other theories suggested that Nettles may have fallen victim to a sexual predator. Between 1999 and 2002, police received two separate reports alleging that he had been sexually assaulted and later killed by a local sex offender. The first allegation was dismissed after police determined that the suspect had moved away from the area before Nettles disappeared. The second was dismissed when a person claiming responsibility for sexually assaulting Nettles was unable to provide supporting evidence.

In 2024, Nettles' mother was featured in an article comparing her son's disappearance with the disappearance of Jack O'Sullivan and the death of Jay Slater.

Despite numerous investigations, public campaigns and documentaries concerning the case, Nettles' whereabouts remain unknown.

== See also ==
- List of people who disappeared mysteriously (2000–present)
- Disappearance of Luke Durbin

== Bibliography ==
- Nettles, Valerie (5 September 2019). The Boy Who Disappeared. Kings Road Publishing. ISBN 978-1-78946-093-3.
