= Rhyddings =

Location
- Haworth Street; Oswaldtwistle; Accrington, Lancashire, BB5 3EA; England
- 53.74566°N 2.39076°W

Information
- Type: Academy
- Local authority: Lancashire
- Trust: LET Education Trust
- Department for Education URN: 148921 Tables
- Ofsted: Reports
- Interim Headteacher: Dave Lancaster
- Gender: Mixed
- Age: 11 to 16
- Enrolment: 642 as of January 2025
- Capacity: 771 as of January 2025
- Website: www.rhyddings.co.uk

Rhyddings (formerly Rhyddings High School and then Rhyddings Business and Enterprise School) is a mixed secondary school in Oswaldtwistle in the English county of Lancashire.

== History ==
A new "hi tech" building for the school opened in March 2003, replacing the annex which had been in use since the 1920s.

The former headteacher was Paul Trickett, who replaced Barry Burke. Burke took over from his predecessor, Joyce Moore, in January 1998. She began as headteacher in 1974, being the first woman headteacher at a mixed school in Lancashire.

In December 2013, it was reported that a quarter of teachers faced redundancy, due to more schools competing for fewer pupils. In June 2014, Trevor Ainsworth, the deputy headteacher, announced his retirement from the school, after spending his entire teaching career in Rhyddings, starting in 1977.

The school was inspected by Ofsted in 2014 and judged Good.

In January 2016, the school was named one of "329 Failing Secondary Schools".. Rhyddings most recent inspection was in 2025.

Previously a community school administered by Lancashire County Council, in June 2022 Rhyddings converted to academy status. The school is now sponsored by the LET Education Trust.

== Academics ==
Rhyddings offers GCSEs and BTECs as programmes of study for pupils.

== Notable former pupils ==
- Vicky Entwistle, actress
- Paul Manning, undercover police officer and whistleblower
- Jay Slater, a 19-year-old man who disappeared in Tenerife and was later found dead in a ravine by police
