= Hans Henning Atrott =

German activist (1944–2018)

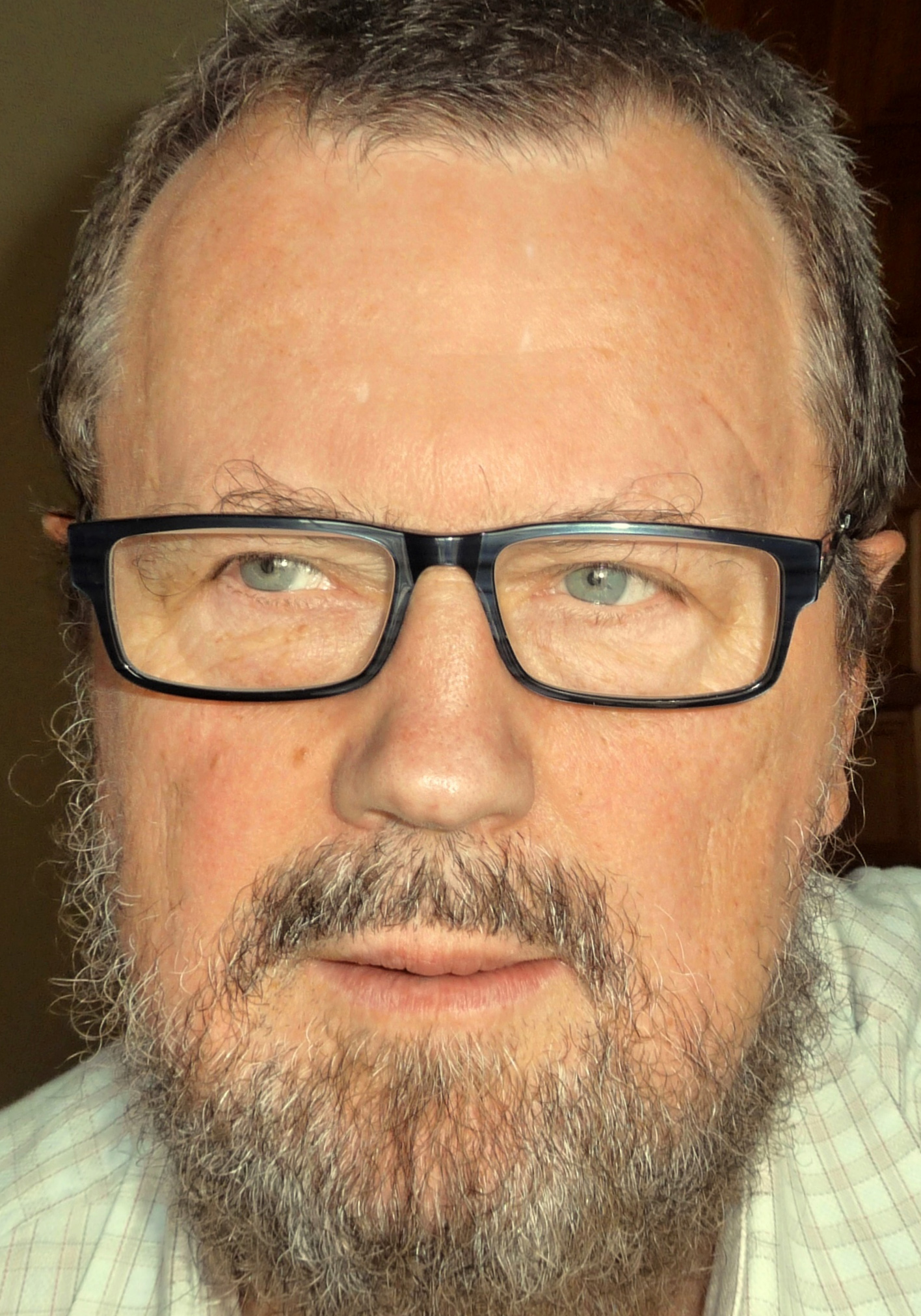
Atrott in 2011

Hans Henning Atrott, also Hans Atrott, (born 12 January 1944 in Memel, East Prussia now Klaipėda, Lithuania - 2018) was notable for his commitment in the German right-to-die movement.

== Biography ==
His father was Protestant minister at James Church in Memel. Neither of his parents survived World War II. He spent his childhood with his maternal grandparents and in Christian boarding schools.

He studied philosophy, political science and sociology (of medicine) at LMU Munich and the Bavarian School of Public Policy. As student from 1969 to 1971, he was federal, i.e., national, chairman of the Association of East Prussian Students in Germany (Studentenbund Ostpreußen).

Atrott was the founder and first president of the German society for voluntary euthanasia (D.G.H.S.) then based in Augsburg, Bavaria, and former secretary (executive director) of the World Federation of Right to Die Societies. He introduced living wills ("Patientenverfügungen") in Germany and was the first to promote voluntary euthanasia after World War II within Germany.

He self-published his theories in his books "Jesus' Bluff - The universal Scandal of the World (M. Magnes)", in 2009 and in 2015 "Cross and Crime - Jesus Came to Crucify the World (The Gospel of Philip)." Both books have been translated into Spanish, the latter, in addition, into French.

From 1978 until his death, he was married to Anita Atrott (born 7 March 1958). Atrott left Germany in 1995. He was a father and grandfather. Depending on the seasons of a year, towards the end of his life, he shared his time between Klaipéda, (Lithuania), Los Gigantes (Spain) and Switzerland, where his descendants also live. He died in 2018.
