= Masca Gorge =

Valley in Spain

Coordinates: 28.295°N 16.851°W

Masca Gorge (Spanish: Barranco de Masca) is a narrow valley in the north-west of the island of Tenerife. The gorge is situated within the Teno Massif. The gorge is a popular tourist destination due to its dramatic scenery and unique geology. An eight-kilometre long walking trail begins at Masca village and continues for the length of the gorge to finish at Masca beach (Spanish: Playa de Masca), approximately ten kilometres from the north-west tip of Tenerife.

== Geology ==
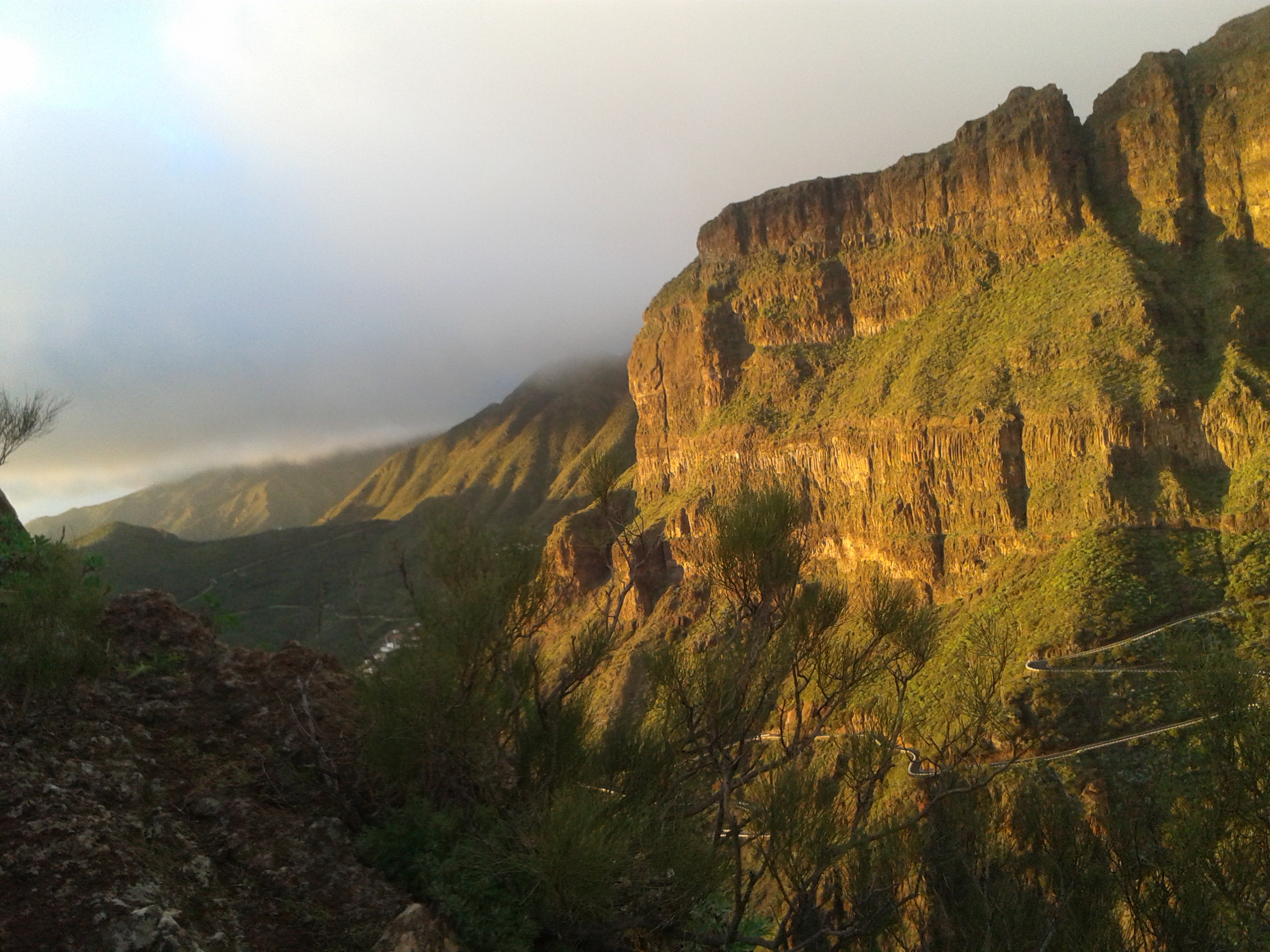
View of Barranco de Masca in the golden hour.

Masca Gorge is found within the Teno Massif, a Miocene-age volcanic formation composed of basaltic lava flows. Much of the gorge itself is formed by steeply-dipping volcanic flows. These flows are generally less than a metre thick and mostly basaltic with scoriaceous inclusions. The flows have subsequently been intruded by several swarms of dykes, many of which form cross-cutting relationships.

A particular formation of interest is the Masca Unconformity. The unconformity consists of a polymictite breccia that varies in both thickness and dip angle depending on location. Within Masca Gorge, the breccia may be 10 – 15 metres, thick, and dip at an angle of 30 - 60 degrees to the north.
