= El Día (Canary Islands) =

Spanish newspaper of Santa Cruz de Tenerife

- Type: Daily newspaper
- Format: Tabloid
- Founded: 1910; 115 years ago
- Political alignment: Canarian nationalism
- Language: Spanish
- Headquarters: Santa Cruz de Tenerife
- Website: eldia.es

El Día (The Day) is a Spanish language newspaper published in the city of Santa Cruz de Tenerife (Canary Islands, Spain), founded in 1910 under the name of La Prensa. It is the largest paper in Santa Cruz de Tenerife. According to EGM, it is the newspaper with the most daily readers in the Canary Islands on average.
