= Playa de la Arena =

Resort down in Tenerife, Spain

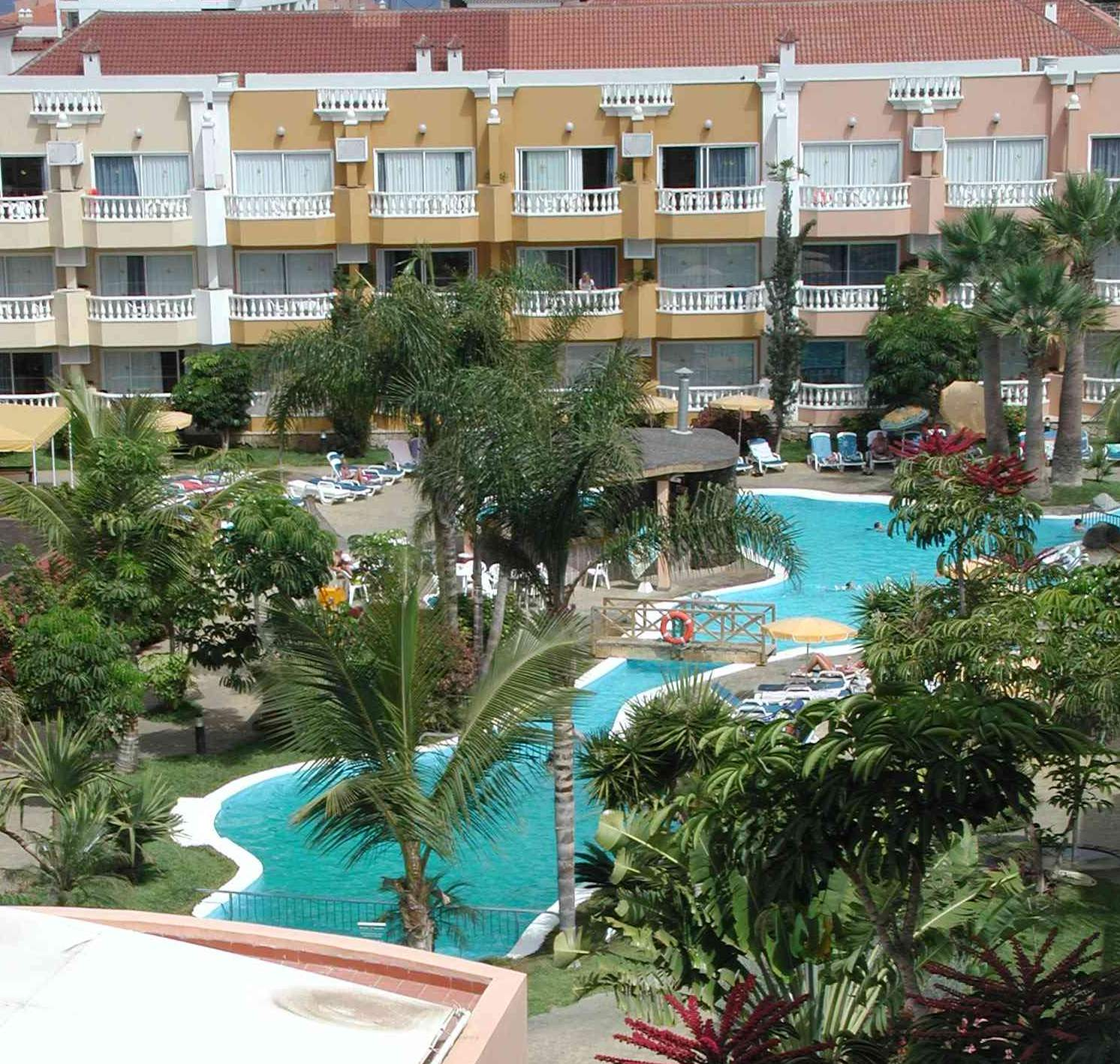
The resort of Barcelo Varadero, just south of Playa De La Arena

Playa de la Arena is a resort town located south of Los Gigantes and Puerto Santiago resorts in the Santiago del Teide municipality on the West Coast of Tenerife, Spain. Located close to Los Gigantes, the prominent cliffs of the resort can be seen from across Playa De La Arena (translation: 'Beach of Sand', i.e. sandy beach). The resort contains many restaurants, bars, and shops aimed predominantly to tourists. Playa de la Arena's main business is tourism, with around 5.8 million tourists in 2023. The playa is entirely made of black, natural, volcanic sand. The beach has been awarded the European Blue Flag for cleanliness for years.

== Tourism ==
Playa de la Arena receives tourists mainly from Spain and the United Kingdom but also from Lithuania, Poland, Germany, and the Netherlands. There are three leading hotels in Playa de la Arena: the Playa de la Arena hotel, which can be seen from the central part of the town, Barcelo Varadero, and the Bahia Flamingo.

=== Hotel Playa La Arena ===
The Hotel Playa La Arena is situated in the resort of Puerto Santiago, on the rise, overlooking Playa de la Arena village. The hotel has 432 rooms, three bars, a piano (evening), nightclub (every night), a pool (daytime) and two restaurants, one by the pool and a pool snack bar. The hotel is part of the 'Be Live' chain, whose parent company, 'Edustro SA' (Madrid), is developing on behalf of the group a brand new complex of residential homes and apartments 'Residencial Playa de la Arena' on the hill rising above the resort. This development aims to protect the area surrounding and overlooking the group's latest flagship hotel, the 'Hotel Costa Los Gigantes', which opened in late 2008. The development was delayed due to planning issues, as the land spanned two neighboring authorities.

=== Barcelo Varadero ===
South of Playa de la Arena, is the Barcelo Varadero resort in El Varadero, around 500 meter/550 yard from Playa de la Arena. The hotel, part of the Barcelo hotel chain, has 319 apartments spaced over six blocks, named from A to F, as well as three swimming pools and a tennis court.

=== Bahia Flamingo ===
With 142 rooms, the hotel Bahia Flamingo stands next to Barcelo Varadero. The hotel offers leisure and sports activities such as tennis, archery and football.
