= Masca =

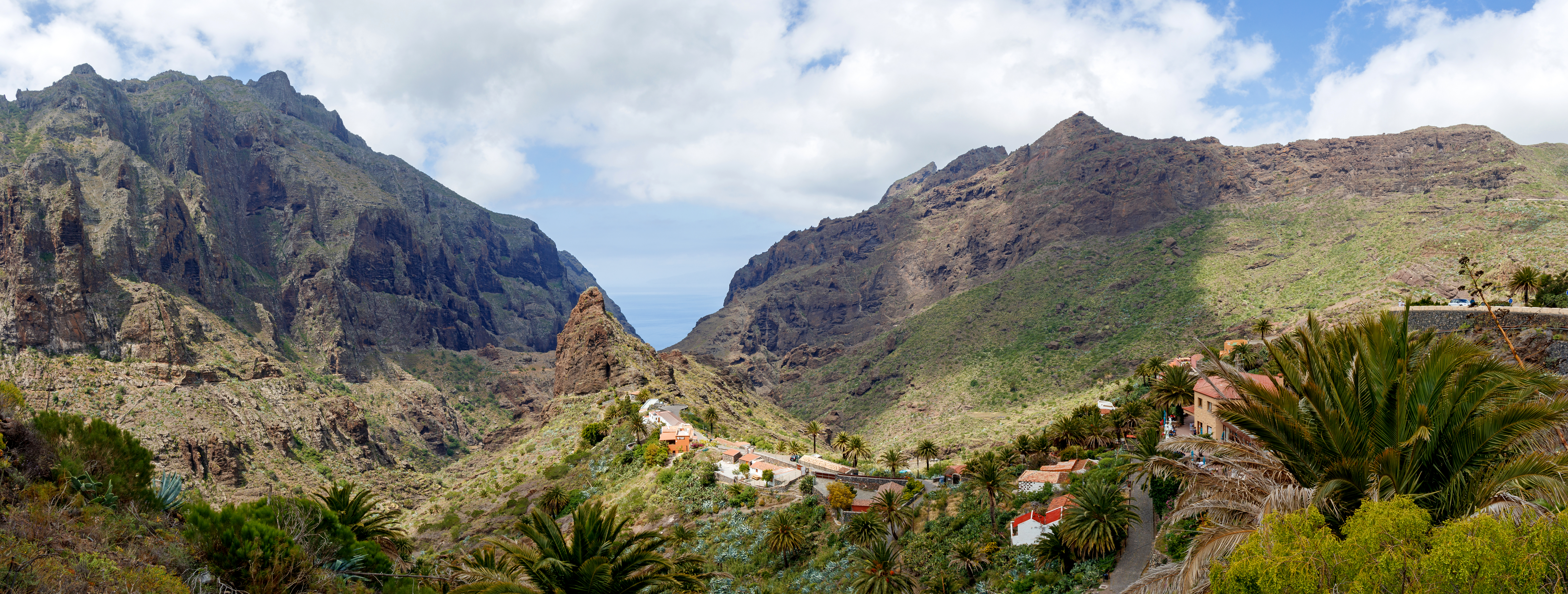
- Masca in Tenerife

- Location in the Canary Islands
- Coordinates: 28°18′19″N 16°50′25″W
- Country: Spain
- Autonomous community: Canary Islands
- Province: Santa Cruz de Tenerife
- Island: Tenerife
- Municipality: Buenavista del Norte

Population (2013)
  - Total: 99
- Time zone: WET
  - Summer (DST): WEST
- Official language(s): Spanish

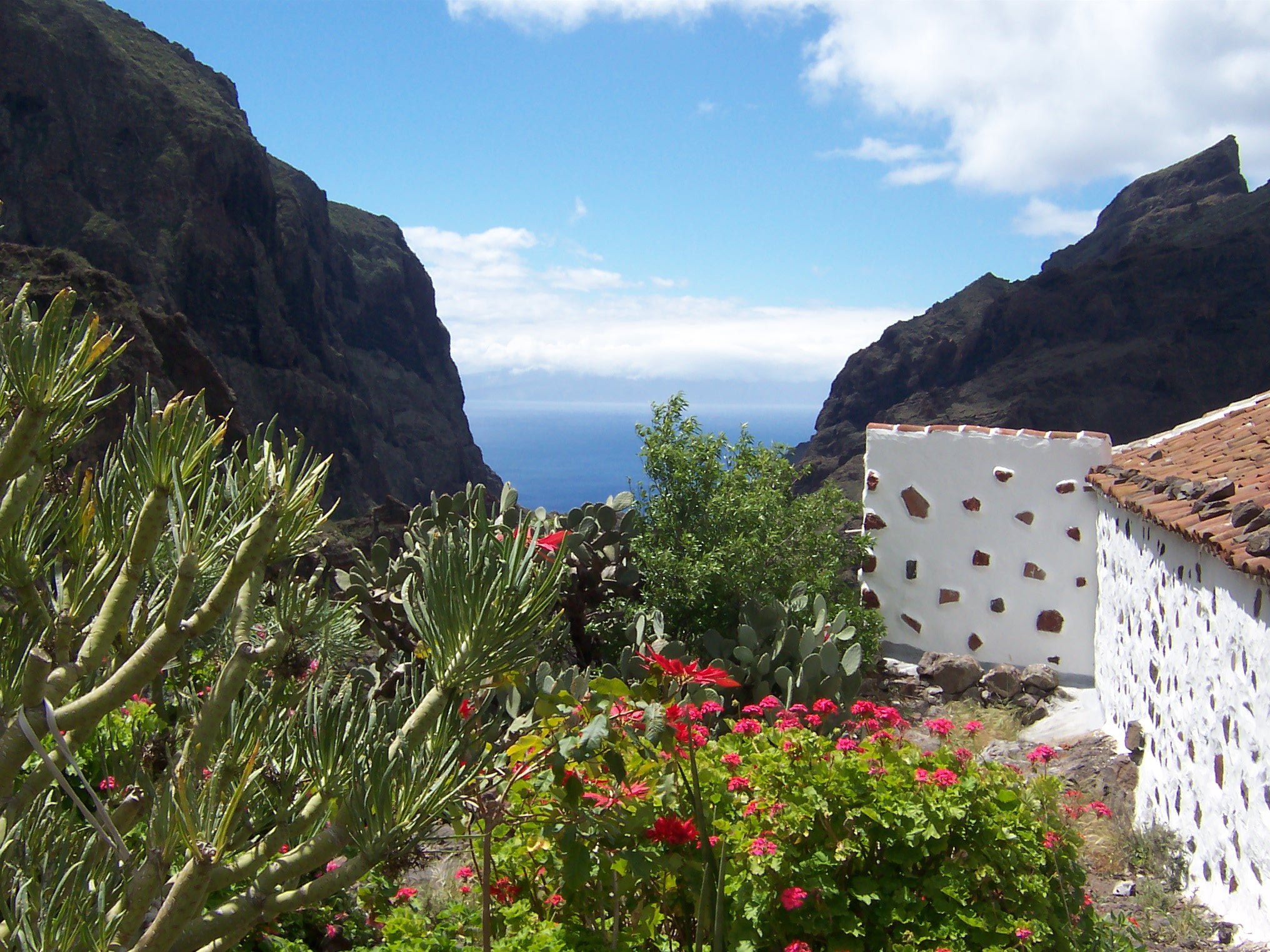
View of La Gomera from Masca

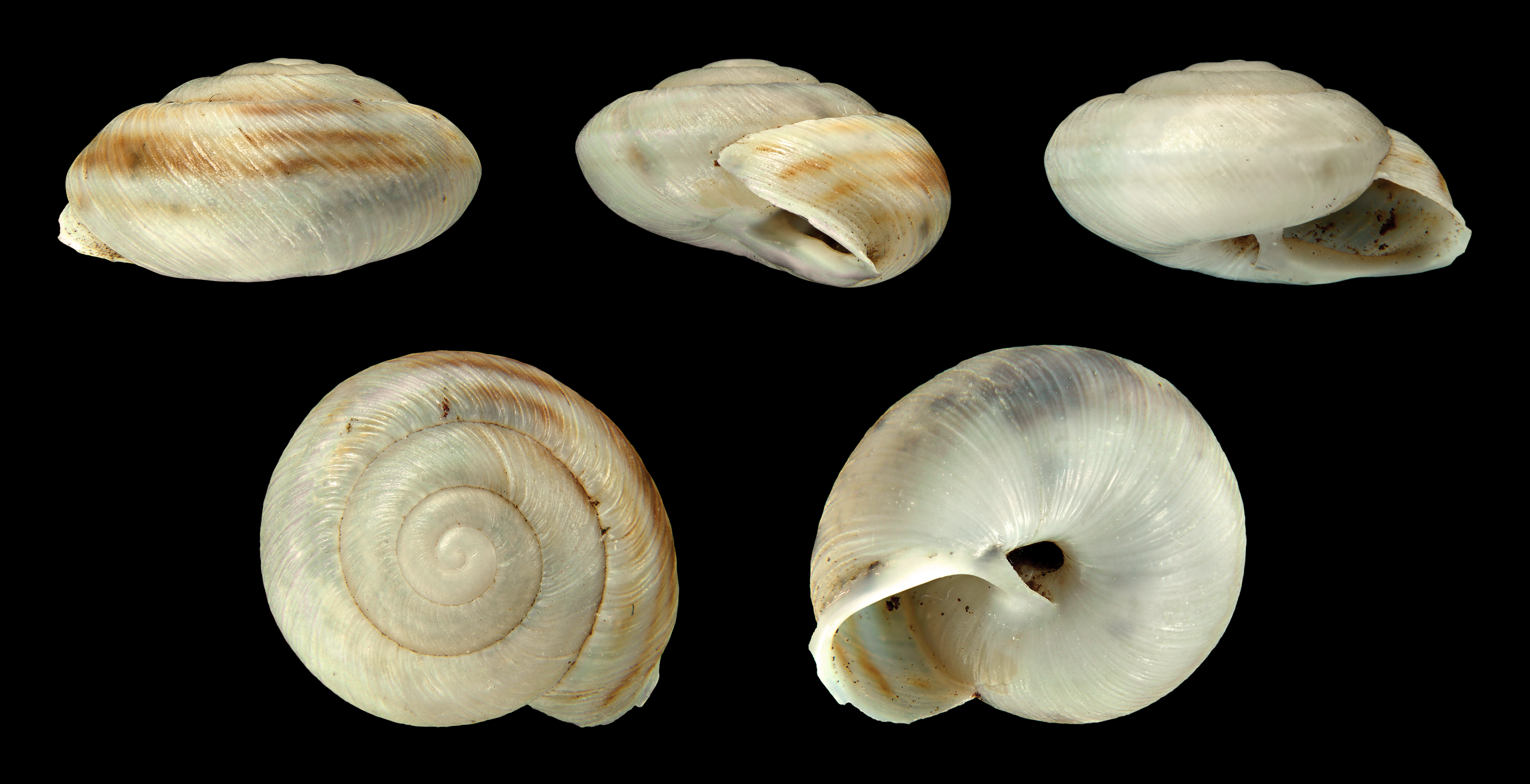
Shell of Hemicycla mascaensis, an endemic land snail of Tenerife, named after the village of Masca

Masca is a small mountain village on the island of Tenerife. It was originally a Guanche settlement before the Spanish conquest in 1496. The village is now home to around 90 inhabitants. The village lies at an altitude of 650 m in the Macizo de Teno mountains, which extend up to the northwesternmost point of Tenerife.

Forests including cypresses and palm trees abound. The village lies at the head of the Masca Gorge. The trail from the village down the gorge to the beach on the Atlantic Ocean is a popular, though strenuous, hiking route, which takes about 3 hours each way. These "hiking routes" are not just demanding but also strenuous, with conditions that can be life-threatening without the proper preparation.ref>"Fire outbreak in Masca near search area for missing Brit Jay Slater". Canarian Weekly. 30 June 2024.</ref>
