= List of films at the 2014 Sundance Film Festival =

The following is a list of all films shown at the 2014 Sundance Film Festival.

== Feature competition ==
The following films were shown in competition at the 2014 Sundance Film Festival.

=== U.S. Documentary ===
The following 16 films were selected for a world premiere in U.S. Documentary Competition program. Dinosaur 13 by Todd Miller served as the opening film of the program.

Title	Director	Year	First showing
Alive Inside: A Story of Music and Memory	Michael Rossato-Bennett	2013	January 18
All the Beautiful Things	John Harkrider	2013	January 20
Captivated: The Trials of Pamela Smart	Jeremiah Zagar	2014	January 17
The Case Against 8	Ben Cotner and Ryan White	2013	January 18
Cesar's Last Fast	Richard Ray Perez and Lorena Parlee	2013	January 19
Dinosaur 13	Todd Miller	2014	January 16
E-Team	Katy Chevigny and Ross Kauffman	2013	January 18
Fed Up	Stephanie Soechtig	2013	January 19
The Internet's Own Boy: The Story of Aaron Swartz	Brian Knappenberger	2014	January 20
Ivory Tower	Andrew Rossi	2013	January 18
Marmato	Mark Grieco	2014	January 17
No No: A Dockumentary	Jeffrey Radice	2014	January 20
The Overnighters	Jesse Moss	2013	January 17
Private Violence	Cynthia Hill	2013	January 19
Rich Hill	Andrew Droz Palermo and Tracy Droz Tragos	2014	January 19
Watchers of the Sky	Edet Belzberg	2014	January 20

=== U.S. Dramatic ===
The following 16 films were selected for a world premiere in U.S. Dramatic Competition program. Whiplash by Damien Chazelle served as the opening film of the program.

Title	Director	Year	First showing
Camp X-Ray	Peter Sattler	2014	January 17
Cold in July	Jim Mickle	2014	January 18
Dear White People	Justin Simien	2013	January 18
Fishing Without Nets	Cutter Hodierne	2013	January 17
God's Pocket	John Slattery	2013	January 17
Happy Christmas	Joe Swanberg	2013	January 19
Hellion	Kat Candler	2014	January 17
Infinitely Polar Bear	Maya Forbes	2013	January 18
Jamie Marks Is Dead	Carter Smith	2014	January 19
Kumiko, the Treasure Hunter	David Zellner	2014	January 20
Life After Beth	Jeff Baena	2014	January 19
Low Down	Jeff Preiss	2013	January 19
The Skeleton Twins	Craig Johnson	2013	January 18
The Sleepwalker	Mona Fastvold	2013	January 20
Song One	Kate Barker-Froyland	2014	January 20
Whiplash	Damien Chazelle	2014	January 16

=== World Cinema Documentary ===
The following 12 films were selected for a world premiere in World Cinema Documentary Competition program. The Green Prince by Nadav Schirman served as the opening film of the program.

Title	Director	Year	First showing
20,000 Days on Earth	Iain Forsyth and Jane Pollard	2014	January 20
Concerning Violence	Göran Hugo Olsson	2014	January 17
The Green Prince	Nadav Schirman	2014	January 16
Happiness	Thomas Balmès	2014	January 17
Love Child	Valerie Veatch	2014	January 17
Mr. Leos caraX	Tessa Louise-Salomé	2014	January 20
My Prairie Home	Chelsea McMullan	2014	January 17
The Notorious Mr. Bout	Tony Gerber and Maxim Pozdorovkin	2014	January 17
The Return to Homs	Talal Derki	2014	January 17
Sepideh – Reaching for the Stars	Berit Madsen	2014	January 17
We Come as Friends	Hubert Sauper	2014	January 18
Web Junkie	Shosh Shlam and Hilla Medalia	2014	January 19

=== World Cinema Dramatic ===
The following 12 films were selected for a world premiere in World Cinema Dramatic Competition program. Lilting by Hong Khaou served as the opening film of the program.

Title	Director	Year	First showing
52 Tuesdays	Sophie Hyde	2013	January 18
Blind	Eskil Vogt	2013	January 17
Difret	Zeresenay Berhane Mehari	2014	January 18
The Disobedient	Mina Djukic	2014	January 20
God Help the Girl	Stuart Murdoch	2013	January 18
Liar's Dice	Geetu Mohandas	2013	January 18
Lilting	Hong Khaou	2013	January 16
Lock Charmer (Spanish: El cerrajero)	Natalia Smirnoff	2013	January 21
To Kill a Man	Alejandro Fernández Almendras	2013	January 17
Viktoria	Maya Vitkova	2013	January 19
Wetlands	David Wnendt	2013	January 18
White Shadow	Noaz Deshe	2013	January 17

=== Short Programs ===
The following 66 short films were selected from a record 8,161 submissions.

==== USA Narrative Short Films ====
Title	Country	Director	Year	Minutes	First showing
130919 • A Portrait of Marina Abramović	USA	Matthu Placek	2013	7	January 21
Afronauts	USA	Frances Bodomo	2014	13	January 18
The Big House (Al Bayt Al Kabeer)	USA, Yemen	Musa Syeed	2013	5	January 17
The Bravest, the Boldest	USA	Moon Molson	2014	17	January 17
Catherine	USA	Dean Fleischer-Camp	2013	13	January 17
Chapel Perilous	USA	Matthew Lessner	2013	14	January 17
Cruising Electric (1980)	USA	Brumby Boylston	2013	2	January 18
Dawn	USA	Rose McGowan	2013	17	January 16
Dig	USA	Toby Halbrooks	2013	10	January 18
The End of Eating Everything	USA	Wangechi Mutu	2013	8	January 17
Funnel	USA	Andre Hyland	2013	8	January 19
Gregory Go Boom	USA	Janicza Bravo	2013	17	January 16
Here Come the Girls	USA, Norway	Young Jean Lee	2013	20	January 17
I'm a Mitzvah	USA	Ben Berman and Josh Cohen	2014	19	January 17
The Immaculate Reception	USA	Charlotte Glynn	2013	16	January 17
Jonathan's Chest	USA	Christopher Radcliff	2014	14	January 17
Kekasih	USA, Malaysia	Diffan Sina Norman	2013	9	January 18
Master Muscles	USA	Efrén Hernández	2013	14	January 17
Me + Her	USA	Joseph Oxford	2014	13	January 18
Person to Person	USA	Dustin Guy Defa	2014	18	January 18
Rat Pack Rat	USA	Todd Rohal	2014	19	January 17
Verbatim	USA	Brett Weiner	2013	7	January 17

==== International Narrative Short Films ====
Title	Country	Director	Year	Minutes	First showing
2 Girls 1 Cake	Denmark	Jens Dahl	2013	13	January 17
Best	United Kingdom	William Oldroyd	2012	3	January 17
Black Mulberry	Georgia, France	Gabriel Razmadze	2012	22	January 17
Burger	United Kingdom, Norway	Magnus Mork	2013	11	January 17
Butter Lamp	France, China	Hu Wei	2013	16	January 16
The Cut	Canada	Geneviève Dulude-De Celles	2013	15	January 17
Exchange & Mart	United Kingdom	Cara Connolly and Martin Clark	2013	15	January 18
Here I Am...There You Are...	Israel	Dikla Jika Elkaslassy	2013	12	January 18
Life's a Bitch	Canada	François Jaros	2013	5	January 17
Metube: August Sings Carmen (Habanera)	Austria	Daniel Moshel	2013	4	January 17
Mi nina mi vida	Canada	Yan Giroux	2013	19	January 17
More Than Two Hours	Iran	Ali Asgari	2013	15	January 17
My Sense of Modesty	France	Sébastien Bailly	2013	21	January 16
Mystery	Spain	Chema García Ibarra	2013	11	January 19
Pleasure	Sweden	Ninja Thyberg	2013	15	January 17
Syndromeda	Sweden	Patrik Eklund	2013	22	January 17
Wakening	Canada	Danis Goulet	2013	9	January 19

==== Documentary Short Films ====
Title	Country	Director	Year	Minutes	First showing
Choreography	USA	David Redmon and Ashley Sabin	2013	9	January 17
Fe26	USA	Kevin Jerome Everson	2014	7	January 18
Godka Cirka (A Hole in the Sky)	Spain, France, USA	Alex Lora and Antonio Tibaldi	2013	10	January 18
Hacked Circuit	USA	Deborah Stratman	2014	15	January 18
I Think This Is the Closest to How the Footage Looked	Israel	Yuval Hameiri and Michal Vaknin	2012	9	January 17
The Last Days of Peter Bergmann	Ireland	Ciaran Cassidy	2013	20	January 18
The Lion's Mouth Opens	USA	Lucy Walker	2013	14	January 18
Love. Love. Love.	Russia	Sandhya Daisy Sundaram	2013	12	January 18
Notes on Blindness	United Kingdom, USA, Australia	Peter Middleton and James Spinney	2014	13	January 17
Of God and Dogs	Syrian Arab Republic	Abounaddara Collective	2013	12	January 18
One Billion Rising	USA	Eve Ensler and Tony Stroebel	2013	9	January 19
Remembering the Artist, Robert De Niro, Sr.	USA	Perri Peltz and Geeta Gandbhir	2013	40	January 17
Tim and Susan Have Matching Handguns	USA	Joe Callander	2013	2	January 17
Untucked	USA	Danny Pudi	2013	15	January 16

==== Animated Short Films ====
Title	Country	Director	Year	Minutes	First showing
Allergy to Originality	USA	Drew Christie	2012	4	January 16
Astigmatismo	Spain	Nicolai Troshinsky	2013	4	January 17
Blame It on the Seagull	Norway	Julie Engaas	2013	13	January 17
Crime: The Animated Series (Marcus McGhee)	USA, Canada	Alix Lambert and Sam Chou	2013	5	January 18
Marilyn Myller	USA, United Kingdom	Mikey Please	2013	6	January 17
The Obvious Child	United Kingdom	Stephen Irwin	2013	12	January 17
Passer Passer	USA	Louis Morton	2013	4	January 17
Phantom Limb	United Kingdom, Australia	Alex Grigg	2013	5	January 17
Piece, Peace	South Korea	Jae-in Park	2013	7	January 17
The Present	Taiwan	Joe Hsieh	2013	15	January 17
Subconscious Password	Canada	Chris Landreth	2013	11	January 16
White Morning	United Kingdom	Paul Barritt	2013	12	January 17
Yearbook	USA	Bernardo Britto	2013	6	January 17

== Non-competition features ==
The following films were shown out of competition at the 2014 Sundance Film Festival.

=== Premieres ===
The following 19 feature films were selected for a world premiere in non-Competition program.

Title	Director	Year	First showing
Boyhood	Richard Linklater	2013	January 19
Calvary	John Michael McDonagh	2013	January 19
Frank	Lenny Abrahamson	2013	January 17
Hits	David Cross	2014	January 21
I Origins	Mike Cahill	2014	January 18
Laggies	Lynn Shelton	2013	January 17
Little Accidents	Sara Colangelo	2014	January 22
Love Is Strange	Ira Sachs	2014	January 18
A Most Wanted Man	Anton Corbijn	2013	January 19
Nick Offerman: American Ham	Jordan Vogt-Roberts	2013	January 23
The One I Love	Charlie McDowell	2014	January 21
The Raid 2: Berandal	Gareth Evans	2013	January 21
Rudderless	William H. Macy	2013	January 24
They Came Together	David Wain	2014	January 24
The Trip to Italy	Michael Winterbottom	2014	January 20
The Voices	Marjane Satrapi	2013	January 19
White Bird in a Blizzard	Gregg Araki	2014	January 20
Wish I Was Here	Zach Braff	2013	January 18
Young Ones	Jake Paltrow	2013	January 18

=== Documentary Premieres ===
The following 12 films were selected for Documentary Premieres program.

Title	Director	Year	First showing
The Battered Bastards of Baseball	Chapman Way and Maclain Way	2014	January 20
Finding Fela	Alex Gibney	2014	January 17
Freedom Summer	Stanley Nelson Jr.	2013	January 17
Happy Valley	Amir Bar-Lev	2013	January 19
Lambert & Stamp	James D. Cooper	2014	January 20
Last Days in Vietnam	Rory Kennedy	2013	January 17
Life Itself	Steve James	2014	January 19
Mitt	Greg Whiteley	2013	January 17
This May Be the Last Time	Sterlin Harjo	2013	January 19
To Be Takei	Jennifer M. Kroot	2014	January 18
We Are the Giant	Greg Barker	2014	January 18
Whitey: United States of America v. James J. Bulger	Joe Berlinger	2014	January 18

=== Spotlight ===
The following 8 films were selected for Spotlight program.

Title	Director	Year	First showing
Blue Ruin	Jeremy Saulnier	2013	January 17
The Double	Richard Ayoade	2013	January 17
Ida	Pawel Pawlikowski	2013	January 21
Locke	Steven Knight	2013	January 17
The Lunchbox	Ritesh Batra	2013	January 19
Only Lovers Left Alive	Jim Jarmusch	2013	January 20
R100	Hitoshi Matsumoto	2013	January 18
Stranger by the Lake	Alain Guiraudie	2013	January 17

=== Next ===
The following 11 films were selected for a world premiere in Next program to highlight the American cinema.

Title	Director	Year	First showing
Appropriate Behavior	Desiree Akhavan	2014	January 18
Drunktown's Finest	Sydney Freeland	2013	January 18
The Foxy Merkins	Madeleine Olnek	2013	January 20
A Girl Walks Home Alone at Night	Ana Lily Amirpour	2014	January 19
Imperial Dreams	Malik Vitthal	2014	January 20
Land Ho!	Martha Stephens and Aaron Katz	2014	January 19
Listen Up Philip	Alex Ross Perry	2014	January 20
Memphis	Tim Sutton	2014	January 17
Obvious Child	Gillian Robespierre	2013	January 17
Ping Pong Summer	Michael Tully	2014	January 18
War Story	Mark Jackson	2014	January 19

=== Park City at Midnight ===
The following 8 films were selected for Park City at Midnight program.

Title	Director	Year	First showing
The Babadook	Jennifer Kent	2014	January 17
Cooties	Jonathan Millott and Cary Murnion	2014	January 18
Dead Snow 2: Red vs. Dead	Tommy Wirkola	2014	January 19
The Guest	Adam Wingard	2014	January 17
Killers	The Mo Brothers	2014	January 20
The Signal	William Eubank	2014	January 20
EDC 2013: Under the Electric Sky	Dan Cutforth and Jane Lipsitz	2013	January 18
What We Do in the Shadows	Taika Waititi and Jemaine Clement	2014	January 19

=== From the Collection ===
The following 2 films were selected for From the Collection program.

Title	Director	Year	First showing
Clerks	Kevin Smith	1994	January 24
Hoop Dreams	Steve James	1994	January 20

=== New Frontier Films ===
The following 7 films were selected for New Frontier Films program.

Title	Director	Year	First showing
The Better Angels	A.J. Edwards	2013	January 18
The Girl from Nagasaki	Michel Comte	2013	January 21
HitRecord on TV	Joseph Gordon-Levitt	2014	January 17
Living stars	Gastón Duprat & Mariano Cohn	2013	January 17
The Measure of All Things	Sam Green	2014	January 20
This World Made Itself; Myth and Infrastructure; Dreaming of Lucid Living	Miwa Matreyek	2013	January 19
Through a Lens Darkly: Black Photographers and the Emergence of a People	Thomas Allen Harris	2013	January 17

=== Sundance Kids ===
The following 2 films were selected for Sundance Kids program.

Title	Director	Year	First showing
Ernest & Celestine	Stéphane Aubier, Benjamin Renner and Vincent Patar	2013	January 18
Zip & Zap and the Marble Gang	Óskar Santos	2013	January 18

=== Free Fail Film ===
The following film was shown at Free Fail Film program.

Title	Director	Year	First showing
Bottle Rocket	Wes Anderson	1996	January 20

=== Surprise Screenings ===
Title	Director	Year	First showing
Nymphomaniac: Vol. I	Lars von Trier	2013	January 21
