= Harkrider =

Harkrider is a last name. Notable people with this last name include:

- John D. Harkrider, writer and director of the 2014 American documentary All the Beautiful Things
- John W. Harkrider, a director of the 1929 American musical comedy Glorifying the American Girl
- Kip Harkrider (born 1975), American Olympic baseball player
- Ryan Harkrider, lead singer of The Nightowls, an American soul musical group
- Colonel Harkrider, a character in Best Foot Forward, a 1943 American musical
