= Heather Simms =

American actress (born 1970)

- Simms in 2026
- Born: Heather Alicia Simms; February 25, 1970 (age 56); Hartford, Connecticut, U.S.
- Occupation: Actress
- Years active: 1996–present

Heather Alicia Simms (born February 25, 1970) is an American actress.

== Early life ==
Born in Hartford, Connecticut. She was raised in New York City, where she attended Midwood High School in Brooklyn, New York.

== Career ==
Simms has appeared in a number of Broadway and Off-Broadway productions, including Ma Rainey's Black Bottom , A Raisin in the Sun and Gem of the Ocean. Her film credits includes Broken Flowers (2005), The Nanny Diaries (2007), and The Light of the Moon. She also provided voice acting for All the Beautiful Things, Red Dead Revolver, Grand Theft Auto: San Andreas, Grand Theft Auto: The Ballad of Gay Tony and Mafia III.

Simms has also guest-starred in a number of television series, including Homicide: Life on the Street, Law & Order, Law & Order: Criminal Intent, Third Watch, The Good Wife, Swarm, and The Equalizer. She had recurring roles in the Netflix series Luke Cage in 2018 playing Auntie Ingrid, and in the Oprah Winfrey Network prime time soap opera The Kings of Napa as Yvette King in 2022. She has since recurred in the series Single Drunk Female, Miss Governor, and Sheriff Country.

== Filmography ==
Key
†	Denotes film or TV productions that have not yet been released

=== Film ===
Year	Title	Role	Notes
1999	Stomping Down at Sugar Love's	Sugar Love	Short
2003	Head of State	Tish	
2003	Kings County	Ethiopia	
2004	Shock Act	Officer Jones	Short
2005	Flutter Kick	Miss Watkins	Short
2005	Broken Flowers	Mona	
2007	Life Support	Woman #2	TV movie
2007	NY's Dirty Laundry	Dhalia	
2007	You Belong to Me	Nicki	
2007	The Nanny Diaries	Murnel	
2009	Stream	Janice Quinn	Short
2012	Red Hook Summer	Sister Sharon Morningstar	
2014	All the Beautiful Things	Barron's Mother (voice)	
2017	Roxanne Roxanne	Ms. Gina	
2017	The Light of the Moon	Detective Becca Miller	
2020	Vampires vs. the Bronx	Gladys Carter	
2026	Lucy Is A Good Girl †	Professor Amity	

=== Television ===
Year	Title	Role	Notes
1996	Homicide: Life on the Street	Maya Sanborn	Episode: "Prison Riot"
1999	Third Watch	Julie	Episode: "Welcome to Camelot"
1999	Law & Order	Serena Lester	Episode: "Haven"
2001	Third Watch	Liz Johnson	Episode: "He Said/She Said"
2004	Whoopi	Bobbi	Episode: "Don't Hide Love"
2005	Law & Order	Althea Sands	Episode: "Birthright"
2005	Law & Order: Criminal Intent	Rosella	Episodes: "No Exit"
2005–06	As the World Turns	Nurse Jacobs	Regular Cast
2006	Law & Order: Criminal Intent	Paulette Leger	Episodes: "Tru Love"
2010	The Good Wife	Female Guard	Episode: "Nine Hours"
2018	Seven Seconds	Elle	Episode: "Boxed Devil" & "Bailed Out"
2018	Sneaky Pete	Lola	Episode: "Inside Out"
2018	The Last O.G.	Tamara	Episode: "Swipe Right"
2018	Luke Cage	Auntie Ingrid	Recurring Cast: Season 2
2018	Random Acts of Flyness	Auntie Jess	Episode: "Items Outside The Shelter But Within Reach"
2019	Broad City	Doris	Episode: "Lost and Found"
2020	High Maintenance	Pam-Anne Charles	Episode: "Soup"
2020	For Life	Alice Martin	Episode: "The Necessity Defense"
2021	Blue Bloods	Diana Brooks	Episode: "Redemption"
2022	Bull	Vernice Rice	Episode: "False Positive"
2022	The Kings of Napa	Yvette King	7 episodes
2023	Swarm	Loretta Greene	Episode: "Fallin' Through the Cracks"
2023	Single Drunk Female	Annalisa	3 episodes
2025	Miss Governor	Senator Grace	2 episodes
2025	The Equalizer	Elita	Episode: "Taken"
2025–26	Sheriff Country	Laurie	2 episodes

=== Video games ===
Year	Title	Role	Notes
2004	Red Dead Revolver	Bad Bessie / Cheryl Lynn / Dancing Girl	Voice
2004	Grand Theft Auto: San Andreas	Denise Robinson	Voice
2009	Grand Theft Auto IV: The Ballad of Gay Tony	The People of Liberty City	Voice
2016	Mafia III	Additional Voices	Voice
2021	Grand Theft Auto: The Trilogy – The Definitive Edition	Denise Robinson	Remaster of Grand Theft Auto: San Andreas only

=== Theatre ===
Year	Title	Role	Venue	Ref.
2003	Ma Rainey's Black Bottom	Dussie Mae	Broadway, Royale Theatre	
2004	A Raisin in the Sun	Ruth/Beneatha (Understudy)	Broadway, Royale Theatre	
2004	Gem of the Ocean	Black Mary (Standby)	Broadway, Walter Kerr Theatre	
2013	Vanya and Sonia and Masha and Spike	Cassandra (Understudy)	Broadway, John Golden Theatre	
2023	Purlie Victorious	Missy Judson	Broadway, Music Box Theatre	
2026	School Girls; Or, the African Mean Girls Play	Headmistress Francis	Broadway, Samuel J. Friedman Theatre	
