= Disobedient =

Disobedient may refer to:

- The Disobedient (Serbian: Neposlušni), a 2014 Serbian drama film
- Disobedient (album), by American metalcore band Stick to Your Guns
- Disobedient, a live album by Chris Carter

== See also ==
- Disobedience (disambiguation)
