= Life After Beth =

2014 film by Jeff Baena

- Theatrical release poster
- Directed by: Jeff Baena
- Written by: Jeff Baena
- Produced by: Michael Zakin; Liz Destro
- Starring: Aubrey Plaza; Dane DeHaan; Molly Shannon; Cheryl Hines; Paul Reiser; Matthew Gray Gubler; John C. Reilly
- Cinematography: Jay Hunter
- Edited by: Colin Patton
- Music by: Black Rebel Motorcycle Club
- Production companies: American Zoetrope; Abbolita Productions; Starstream Entertainment; XYZ Films
- Distributed by: A24
- Release dates: January 19, 2014 (Sundance); August 15, 2014 (United States)
- Running time: 85–89 minutes
- Country: United States
- Language: English
- Budget: $2.4 million
- Box office: $274,717

Life After Beth is a 2014 American zombie comedy film (Note: Writer-director Jeff Baena said that instead of attaching a genre, he saw it as a "relationship film", while stars Dane DeHaan and Aubrey Plaza humorously said it was a "rom-com-zom-dram" (romantic comedy zombie drama). A 2016 zombie almanac described it as a "mumblecore relationship break-up zomcom".) written and directed by Jeff Baena. The film stars Aubrey Plaza, Dane DeHaan, Molly Shannon, Cheryl Hines, Paul Reiser, Matthew Gray Gubler, and John C. Reilly. A cameo by Garry Marshall was one of his final film appearances.

Baena wrote the script in 2003; though it was well received in Hollywood, an early production quickly fell through. Nearly a decade later, Plaza was introduced to the script independently of her relationship with Baena, and wanted to star. Her involvement – and the coincidental postponement of another film Baena was working on – meant that Life After Beth entered production quickly in 2012, with principal photography taking place in the summer of 2013.

Inspired by the story of Orpheus and Eurydice, it follows Zach (DeHaan) after his girlfriend Beth (Plaza) has died and been reanimated as a zombie: Zach struggles in trying to grieve the Beth he knew while also trying to prevent the zombie Beth's deterioration. Rather than focusing on the zombie apocalypse happening, the film follows Zach navigating his relationship in suburbia.

It premiered in competition at the 2014 Sundance Film Festival on January 19, 2014, and was given a limited release on August 15, 2014. The film received mixed reviews, with praise for Plaza's performance; opinions differed on Baena's writing, particularly in terms of zombie tropes and the film's ending, and management of genre and tone.

== Plot ==
Zach Orfman is devastated when his girlfriend, Beth Slocum, dies after being bitten by a venomous snake while hiking. He begins spending time with Beth's parents, Geenie and Maury; when Zach confesses that he and Beth were having problems in their relationship, Maury tries to brush it off.

When Geenie and Maury suddenly stop contacting Zach, he visits their house and sees Beth through a window. Zach yells to be let in but his brother Kyle, a security officer, escorts him off the premises. Zach breaks in to the Slocum's that night and discovers that Beth has risen from the dead and her parents have been hiding her. He begins having arguments with Geenie and Maury about Beth. They are reluctant to let her leave the house during daytime and refuse to tell her that she died. When Zach takes Beth on a daytime date in the park, her face starts to blister and Maury bans Zach from seeing Beth. Zach continues to sneak in.

Beth grows increasingly violent and begins having severe mood swings. Zach notices other people around town acting similarly and tries to sort out his thoughts by talking to childhood friend, Erica Wexler. As they leave the diner, Zach accidentally runs Beth over with his car. Unharmed, she scares helpful bystanders away by screaming at them. After a violent confrontation with Erica, when Beth mistakenly assumes Zach is cheating on her, Zach brings Beth to her grave and tells her the truth. Zach tries to break up with her, only for her to angrily drive off in his car.

Maury implores Zach to tell Beth that he lied about her being dead and promise to stay with her forever, to which Zach reluctantly agrees, noticing that Beth's emotional stability slows her zombie behavior. He tries to run away with her, wanting to avoid the growing problems with the town, which also agitate Beth, but Maury knocks him out to take Beth home. Once Zach wakes, he returns home to find burnt bodies in the backyard, which he believes to be his family.

Zach prepares to leave the state, but changes his mind and drives back to the Slocum house. He finds the house in disarray and discovers that Beth, now a full-fledged bloodthirsty zombie, has eaten Maury and some of Geenie's fingers. Zach enables Geenie to escape and calms Beth by promising to hike with her. They run into Kyle, who is hunting zombies and explains that their parents are still alive and have fled to a safehouse. Kyle gives Zach his handgun and encourages him to put Beth out of her misery. Zach and Beth stop by a cliff. He tearfully apologizes for never doing the things she wanted when she was still alive. They profess their love to each other before Zach shoots her in the head.

Zach is reunited with his family at the safehouse, along with a traumatized Erica, who was forced to kill her own grandmother. The survivors make plans to leave town, but the power suddenly returns and a TV news report claims things have returned to normal. Some time later, Zach visits Beth and Maury's graves. Zach invites Erica for dinner and she accepts, smiling as they drive off.

== Cast ==
- Dane DeHaan as Zach Orfman
- Aubrey Plaza as Beth Slocum
- John C. Reilly as Maury Slocum
- Molly Shannon as Geenie Slocum
- Cheryl Hines as Judy Orfman
- Paul Reiser as Noah Orfman
- Matthew Gray Gubler as Kyle Orfman
- Anna Kendrick as Erica Wexler
- Paul Weitz as Mr. Levin
- Alia Shawkat as Roz
- Adam Pally as Diner Sommelier
- Jim O'Heir as Chip the Mailman
- Garry Marshall as Grandpa Orfman
- Thomas McDonell as Dan
- Rob Delaney as News Anchor
- Nick Offerman as Documentary Narrator

== Production ==
=== Writing and development ===
Jeff Baena wrote the screenplay for Life After Beth – originally titled Winged Life after a line in a William Blake poem – in two weeks in 2003 as production was wrapping on I Heart Huckabees, his first major film credit. His initial ideas were of a girlfriend suddenly dying, the boyfriend seeing her through a window one day, and the couple trying to make their relationship work. Baena was going through a break-up around the time, which he felt subconsciously influenced his story. He said that the film for him was about a bad relationship, the wish fulfillment of getting back together, and the curse of reconciliation being a disaster; he also reflected that the story is not necessarily about break-ups, but how people work through any kind of personal pain. Predominantly a working screenwriter before he directed Life After Beth, it was his only spec script and the first film he wrote with the intention of directing himself. It appeared on the inaugural Black List – an industry survey of the most promising unproduced scripts – and was cited as an example of outstanding writing in coverage guidelines.

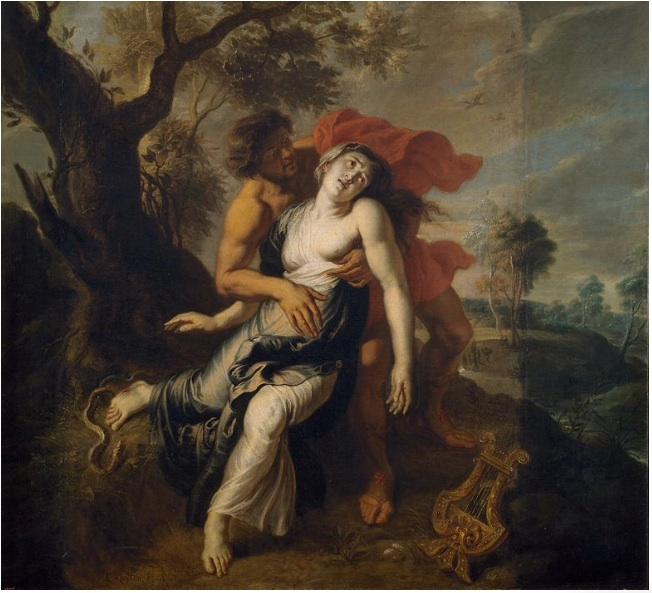
The Death of Eurydice by Erasmus Quellinus II

Eternity

He who binds to himself a joy
Does the winged life destroy
But he who kisses the joy as it flies
Lives in eternity's sun rise

— William Blake

Not specifically interested in making a zombie film, Baena was thematically influenced by Blake's poem "Eternity" and inspired by the story of Orpheus and Eurydice, which also gave the Orpheus-substitute character Zach his last name of Orfman. In writing Zach's emotional response to his girlfriend's return, Baena was drawn to "the Todorovian sort of hesitation between the marvelous and the uncanny" – to create uncertainty in whether the girlfriend character had been resurrected or was part of a scam or otherwise – and using the fantastical setting to explore grounded character dynamics.

In 2004, the film was in development at Fox Searchlight Pictures with Joseph Gordon-Levitt as Zach. When this production fell through, Baena put the project down until the agent of comic actress Aubrey Plaza was looking for a role for Plaza to break away from being typecast as characters similar to her role as April Ludgate on Parks and Recreation. Plaza's agent remembered the script and showed Plaza, who said it was "one of the best scripts that [she had] ever read". Baena and Plaza were already in a relationship but, because Baena had moved on from the project, he had not considered Plaza for the role of Beth until she brought up the script to him and he felt she was ideal for the role.

Baena attached producer friend Michael Zakin, at which point the project gained momentum. He said Life After Beth moved into production very quickly; Baena pivoted to focus on the film when pre-production for Joshy, which he had intended to be his directorial debut, had to be postponed by collaborator Adam Pally for personal reasons. They had received a California Tax Credit for Joshy and needed to shoot something in California within 100 days, filming an extra scene for Life After Beth to achieve this and then going ahead with production. Producer Liz Destro noted that the pre-production was helped by having availability for lead actors Plaza and Dane DeHaan, which brought in financing. Baena also attributed production speed to how he found it easier to gather support after the 2000s zombie film revival, compared to the initial production attempt in 2004 when zombie comedy was not an established genre.

He said that despite some initial "feelings of disappointment and unresolved crap" when the film was picked back up, he discarded those thoughts and got on with making it. He made some technical rewrites, including removing a layer of the film that reflected on the early presidency of George W. Bush that he felt lacked relevancy, but did not want to rewrite it any further as he did not want the core of his story to be affected by the influence of major zombie films (naming Shaun of the Dead and Zombieland) that had been released after 2003.

=== Casting ===
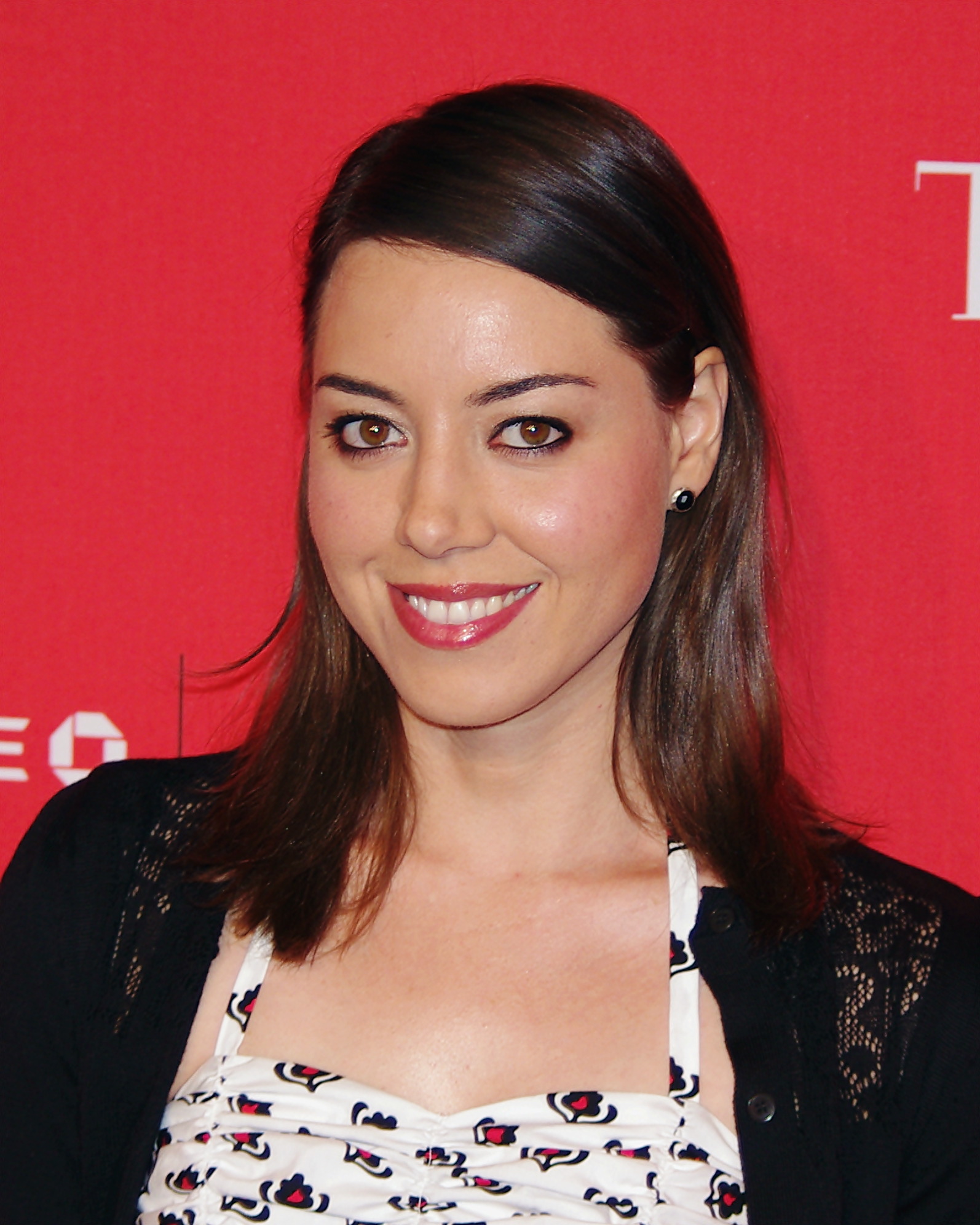
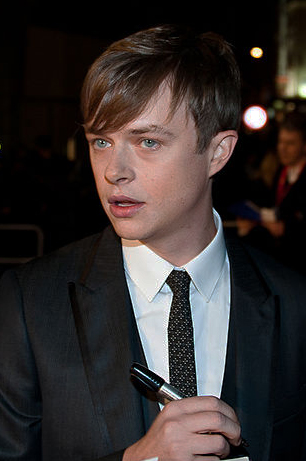
Aubrey Plaza (left, pictured in 2012) and Dane DeHaan (right, pictured in 2013) play the main characters in Life After Beth.

When production began with Plaza attached, Baena reached out to John C. Reilly – to whom he had been introduced by close friend Miguel Arteta – with the script and signed him on. Attracting the cast then "snowballed", with DeHaan joining next; Baena wanted a more dramatic actor to keep the film grounded and asked DeHaan after they met at a poker night Baena hosted. The ensemble cast includes a number of popular comedic actors, many of whom Baena had personally approached with the concept and felt lucky they responded, explaining that much of the supporting cast were performers he had admired since he was young and just wanted to work with. When Baena met with Reilly about his role, Reilly suggested Molly Shannon to play opposite him; Shannon was sent the script and enjoyed how Baena wrote family, as well as the humor in his realism. Neither she nor Cheryl Hines were interested in doing zombie films; when Hines was sent the script it was not labelled as a zombie film and she was interested in the character relationships.

Baena had enjoyed filmmaker Paul Weitz's role in Chuck & Buck, directed by Arteta, and pushed hard to get Weitz to make a cameo; Weitz rescheduled a vacation to be involved and would continue appearing in Baena's future films, along with Plaza, Reilly, Shannon and Pally. Plaza and Pally had been at Upright Citizens Brigade together in the early 2000s, and Baena knew – and began collaborating on ideas with – Pally from playing basketball together. Baena sought out actor Paul Reiser, saying that Reiser's performance in Aliens "was really a seminal moment for me [Baena]"; they had lunch to discuss the film, with Baena happy to bring on a Jewish actor who he felt connected with the material. He also wanted to get another filmmaker, Garry Marshall, to act in the film and managed to connect with him through Fred Roos, who had served with Marshall in the Korean War and was friends with Life After Beth executive producer Francis Ford Coppola. Life After Beth was one of Marshall's last acting roles.

Anna Kendrick joined the cast when Plaza, a close friend, asked her to be in the film with the prospect of fighting her. Plaza also brought on Parks and Recreation castmates Nick Offerman and Jim O'Heir for brief cameos. Kendrick, Shannon, Hines, Reiser and Matthew Gray Gubler were announced to have joined during the first week of filming. Principal photography fit into Gubler's break between seasons of Criminal Minds; filming also began two weeks after DeHaan wrapped filming on The Amazing Spider-Man 2, and (per Baena) ran simultaneous with Reilly filming for Guardians of the Galaxy.

=== Filming ===
Principal photography began in Los Angeles on July 8, 2013, though Baena had originally intended to film it in his hometown of Miami, and lasted 22 shooting days. The opening scene, of Beth hiking, had been shot in 2012; Baena had originally not intended to show Beth prior to her death in the film but decided contextualizing some of her personality would be interesting as a cold open.

Destro explained that they kept the production as small and low budget as they could while adhering to union regulations; the budget ended up at $2.4 million. As Baena had always written the film to direct himself as low-budget, he had kept the number of locations low, with minimal special effects and stunts. In one stunt, Plaza tore the muscles of her abdominal wall. Despite the comic acumen of the cast, Baena said that the film was "95%-98% the script", only incorporating improvisation from some lines Reilly and Plaza had come up with in rehearsals that he liked and added to it. He had expected that, as a small production, there would be little time for rehearsals and improvisation but still gave his cast "license to do whatever they wanted as long as it serviced the movie". The film was told from character Zach's perspective, with the crew making sure the camera was always at his eye level. As a visual reference for the film, Baena said he was inspired by Robert Altman's 3 Women, though obliquely.

The film was shot on Arri Alexa and Canon 5D Mark III digital cameras, with older lenses. Baena said the Arri Alexa was so clear and sharp it became a little uncanny. For the film, they used more naturalistic lighting compared to other zombie films of the time. The production design removed anything red from the film besides blood, so that it would have more of an effect when first seen. Where sets were constructed instead of practical, Baena and cinematographer Jay Hunter still aimed for realism in terms of the physical and lighting limitations of the space.

=== Post-production ===
Post-production had limited time. The crew were given 22 days – the minimum (equal to shooting days) allowed under Directors Guild of America rules – for editing, while availability of Skywalker Ranch for mixing and the deadline for entry to the Sundance Film Festival also posed limits. An early cut was submitted to Sundance in October 2013. Post-production was completed in January 2014. The score was composed by the band Black Rebel Motorcycle Club (BRMC), a group Baena knew and had discussed working on film music with around the time he wrote the screenplay for Life After Beth. As a rock group, BRMC were not used to making music that was intended for the background. They also faced difficulties in coordinating with Baena due to their touring and recording schedule. Baena and Hunter were involved in editing: due to the uncanny nature of the digital film, they took discontinued 250 ASA (likely Vision2) Kodak film to overlay the movie, for its film grain. They specifically added more film grain for later nighttime scenes when "it kind of starts going off the tracks".

== Zombie depiction ==
The zombies appear as a metaphor for a break-up and trying to keep hold of young love, but Baena developed his depiction of zombies in depth. He drew heavily on philosophical ambiguity, including Jacques Derrida's branch of relativist thought, in his thematic approach to zombies as between life and death. He felt that while he did "observe a lot of the zombie tropes [he tried] to reinvent them at the same part." He compared the way his zombies return to their previous lives out of habit to Dawn of the Dead, and the presence of zombie characters who still have mental faculties to Day of the Dead. Professor David Gillota wrote that Life After Beth is more comedy than horror, and Baena's zombies lean more to body humor than the social critique of George A. Romero's Dead films.

Considering fast-moving zombies to be like rabid but otherwise normal people, while also wanting to keep his depiction close to humans, Baena made his zombies "middle-speed". He combined a gradually-increasing amount of the incredible strength and violence typically seen in slow-moving zombies with middle speed in order to emphasize the scarier parts of seeing humans become zombies.

Baena also chose to have his zombies be mostly intact as humans, and to be sentient with personalities, to explore the "emotional and spiritual violence" of the deceased characters seemingly being able to reintegrate into their loved ones' lives before deteriorating. This also led into the film characters being Jewish, as Jewish burial preparation does not include autopsies or embalming bodies, with Baena thinking this made them more likely to return as zombies. He also considered how and why zombies, which are often depicted as eating brains, would get nutrition, and suggested that people with digestive issues would not become zombies.

For the deterioration, Baena came up with five stages of his zombies' physical and mental states becoming more monstrous. The essay "Zombies Want Serious Commitment: The Dread of Liquid Modernity in Life After Beth, Burying the Ex and Nina Forever" from 2017 zombie study collection Romancing the Zombie noted that Beth's deterioration seemed to begin when Zach tried to break up with her the first time, connecting her physical and mental states together, as well as her condition with his devotion to her. In showing his zombies having cognitive differences, Baena showed his zombies being soothed by smooth jazz. He had read about the use of smooth jazz to improve the immune system on a subliminal level and incorporated this, with the idea that as zombies only function at "such a basic human level" the music genre would appeal to them.

Plaza did not base her performance on any preexisting zombie media, both due to the lack of movies that show zombies as having emotions and humanity, and her understanding that zombies are reinvented by each creator and she could make Beth original. Life After Beth was one of the first pieces of zombie media to feature a female zombie as a protagonist, "a notable [addition] to the ever-adapting zombie genre" that professor Elizabeth Aiossa wrote also reflected contemporaneous topics of female sexuality and body politics.

== Release ==
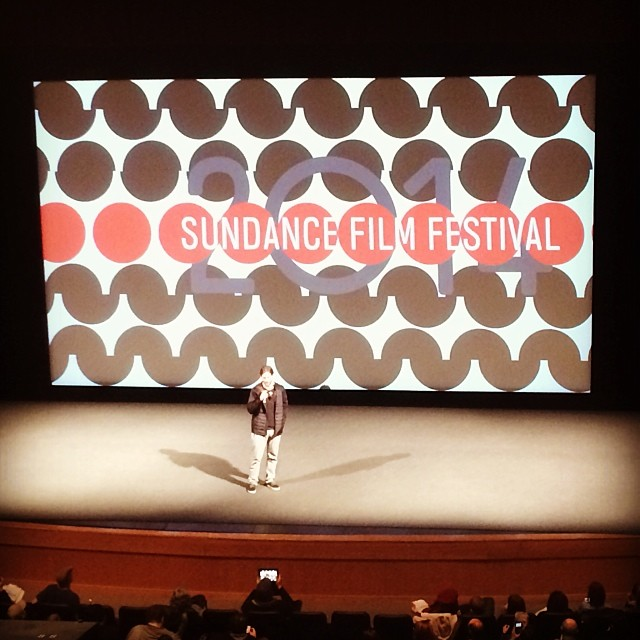
Baena speaking at the Sundance premiere of Life After Beth

The film premiered on January 19, 2014, at the 2014 Sundance Film Festival. Baena had thought that if it was accepted to Sundance, it would be in the Midnight selection of genre films, and was pleasantly surprised when it was a selection in the Dramatic Competition: it ended up in the main selection due to its dramedy story and a lack of much horror or gore. Out of Sundance, Life After Beth went to the European Film Market trade fair, with sales handled by XYZ Films. North American sales were through WME and CAA, and it was picked up by distributor A24.

Through an A24 partnership, it was first released digitally on DirecTV in July 2014, before a simultaneous release on August 15, 2014 in the United States, being made available for streaming and given theatrical premieres at the ArcLight Hollywood in Los Angeles and the Angelika Film Center in New York. The two-theater opening took $18,000, with The Hollywood Reporter describing the $9,000 location average as "muted". The film then had a limited release in the top fifty domestic markets. It was released internationally by various distributors, including Universal Pictures International. In the United Kingdom, it played at FrightFest in August 2014 before being released through Koch Media on October 3. It was R-rated in the US and certified 15 in the UK.

Though Alia Shawkat and Thomas McDonell are still credited in the film, their scenes were completely cut and can be found among the eleven deleted scenes included in home video extras. Life After Beth was released on Blu-ray in the United States on October 21, 2014, with the deleted scenes and other special features: a short documentary about the making of the film titled "Life After Beth: The Post Mortem"; the film's seven trailers; an audio commentary version featuring Baena, Plaza, DeHaan and Gubler; and a clip of Gubler repeatedly improvising different takes on one scene.

== Reception ==
=== Critical response ===
Life After Beth received mixed reviews. On review aggregator Rotten Tomatoes the film has a 46% rating, with an average score of 5.5/10 based on 94 reviews. The site's consensus states, "In spite of Aubrey Plaza's committed performance, Life After Beth remains a sketch-worthy idea that's been uncomfortably stretched to feature length." On Metacritic, which assigns a normalized rating out of 100 based on reviews from critics, the film has a score of 50 out of 100 based on 30 reviews, indicating "mixed or average" reviews.

Mark Kermode praised the cast and highlighted Plaza for "ricocheting between adolescent snarkiness and cadaverous rage". Richard Corliss also celebrated Plaza's performance, saying she "plausibly navigates Beth's journey into full-throttle Linda Blair demonic dementia", as did Jason Bailey of Flavorwire, who felt the film was at its best when working around her energy, and other reviewers. Empire's Owen Williams wrote that Plaza was the only actor in the film not cast to type, and able to "[sink] her teeth into a role that lets her literally chew the scenery." Jordan Raup of The Film Stage instead opined that Plaza was "sadly wasted" with a character neither funny nor scary. The Irish Times's Tara Brady thought Plaza's performance grew "too silly", and praised DeHaan for his "splendidly unconventional leading man." Berkshire, in praising the whole cast, also thought DeHaan showed through the film he was "shaping up to be one of the most idiosyncratic leading men of his generation." David Edelstein felt the chemistry of Plaza and DeHaan anchored the film.

Bailey wrote that "Baena's control of the material is occasionally uncertain", while Kermode felt that Baena controlled his film's tone, also praising the writing choice to forgo explaining the appearance of zombies. Brady was instead disappointed that the "initially clever" film offered no explanations. Brian Eggert of Deep Focus Review gave a negative review based in his criticism of the handling of tone, saying that though the film was "not without its fair share of charms and laughs, the central notion of zombie physical romance is handled in an unbelievable way." Raup's critical review was focused on the writing and direction; he opined that the film had "no discernible vision behind the camera" and said Baena "cop[ped] out" with the ending. Dan Brightmore for NME enjoyed Baena's ability to handle romantic moments as well as slapstick, while Irish Independent's Aine O'Connor thought the tone was "odd and all over the place, it's neither comedy nor horror".

Peter Bradshaw wrote that the film was not as successful a "romzomcom" as either Shaun of the Dead or Warm Bodies (2013), and James White in SFX agreed that Life After Beth "isn't quite as assured as Shaun in its tone"; White acknowledged Baena's combination of wild swings and emotional moments and felt "the result is a less entertaining experience as a whole." Williams thought that the film's tone "is not at all about Shaun-style splatstick, and far more along the lines of Jay and Mark Duplass' Cyrus." While Edelstein and Bradshaw thought the film became cliched when it entered the standard zombie part of the story, White said it did well at avoiding most classic tropes "for something that tries to feel fresh even as its title character rots." In a glowing review, Variety's Geoff Berkshire asserted that Baena "has fun [...] manipulating zombie movie tropes to play with audience expectations"; Berkshire also praised Baena's control of tone and his "sharp and very amusing" plotting of the film, calling it a "notably self-assured debut". Williams and Robbie Collin both concluded that the film showed there was still life in the zombie-comedy genre.

Though giving a positive review, Brightmore said "the film feels slight and you'll be left wishing this spoof had a little more bite." O'Connor thought that it became tired quickly even as the zombies developed. Brady instead wrote that even with "nowhere to go", the film was "an outsized, monstrous romance, [that] is funny and likeable." Jordan Hoffman thought the initial scenes played well for drama but was annoyed when the film continued as dramedy, thinking that "when you've got a juicy premise like 'Zombie Aubrey Plaza' the last thing anyone wants to watch is histrionic yapping."

=== Accolades ===
Both Kendrick and Reilly were nominated as Best Supporting Performance at the 2014 BloodGuts UK Horror Awards. Ain't It Cool News listed Life After Beth as the 26th best horror film of 2014. In 2016, it was ranked the 38th best ever zombie film and described as "the best zom-rom-com since Shaun Of The Dead" in critics' collection Zombies: The Ultimate Celebration, edited by horror film journalist Rosie Fletcher. Later in 2016, Life After Beth was included on The AU Review's list of the Top 10 Horror Films You Really Haven't Seen.

Organization	Date of ceremony	Category	Recipient(s)	Result	Ref.
Edinburgh International Film Festival	June 29, 2014	Audience Award	Life After Beth	Nominated	
Fangoria Chainsaw Awards	June 1, 2015	Best Screenplay	Jeff Baena	Nominated	
Sundance Film Festival	January 26, 2014	U.S. Grand Jury Prize: Dramatic	Life After Beth; Jeff Baena	Nominated	
Rondo Hatton Classic Horror Awards	April 29, 2015	Best Independent Film	Life After Beth	Nominated	
