= The Recruiter =

The Recruiter may refer to:

- The Recruiter (2004 film), a 2004 Russian language film directed by Gulshat Omarova
- The Recruiter (2008 film), a 2008 documentary film directed by Edet Belzberg
- The Recruiter (Squid Game), a character in Squid Game
- The Recruiter (Deadpool), a character in Deadpool

== See also ==
- Recruiter
