= American soldier =

American soldier may refer to:

- A member of the United States Armed Forces
- "American Soldier" (song), by Toby Keith, 2003
- American Soldier (album), by Queensrÿche, 2009
- An American Soldier (opera), a 2014/2018 composition by Huang Ruo, libretto by David Henry Hwang
- The American Soldier, a 1970 West German film by Rainer Werner Fassbinder
- An American Soldier or The Recruiter, a 2008 American documentary film by Edet Belzberg
