= No No: A Dockumentary =

- Sundance film poster
- Directed by: Jeff Radice
- Produced by: Jeff Radice; Chris Cortez; Jeffrey Brown; Mike Blizzard
- Cinematography: John Fiege
- Edited by: Sam Wainwright Douglas
- Music by: Adam Horovitz
- Release date: January 20, 2014 (Sundance)
- Running time: 100 minutes
- Country: United States
- Language: English

No No: A Dockumentary is a 2014 American documentary film directed and produced by Jeffrey Radice. The film premiered in the competition category of the U.S. Documentary Competition program at the 2014 Sundance Film Festival on January 20, 2014.

== Synopsis ==
The film details the life story of American professional baseball player Dock Ellis, his prolific career, his addictions to alcohol and amphetamines, his efforts to help other addicts until his death in 2008, and the no-hitter he threw while under the influence of LSD.

== Reception ==
The film received overwhelmingly positive response from critics. Duane Byrge of The Hollywood Reporter gave the film a positive review, writing:

More than just a documentary focusing on one man’s life, No No: A Dockumentary is not told just between the foul lines. It rounds several story bases: It flexes as a window on the cataclysmic changes of the late 1960s and ’70s, and documents Ellis’ substance abuse."

In Indiewire, Steve Greene wrote:

No No: A Dockumentary becomes a supremely successful biography in acknowledging the reason for Ellis’ fame while showing how that story is just a sliver of what defined his later years" and that "No-No exists as both a measured and vibrant portrait in equal measure, a fitting tribute to a life that encompassed both of those same qualities."

Amber Wilkinson of The Daily Telegraph gave the film four out of five stars and praised the director Jeff Radice:

Radice takes an inventive approach to Ellis's story, using a terrific Seventies soundtrack, animation and manipulated still photography – frequently featuring trippy pops of colour – to maintain the momentum. He also approaches the tale with a sense of humour, even though he never plays down the havoc the pitcher's addictions wreaked on his personal life. An effortless home run."

Drew Taylor, in his review for The Playlist, praised the film:

"No No is a jazzy, joyful exploration of a man that, if he wasn't able to actually change the system, was at least happy with giving it the middle finger."
