= Todd Douglas Miller =

American filmmaker

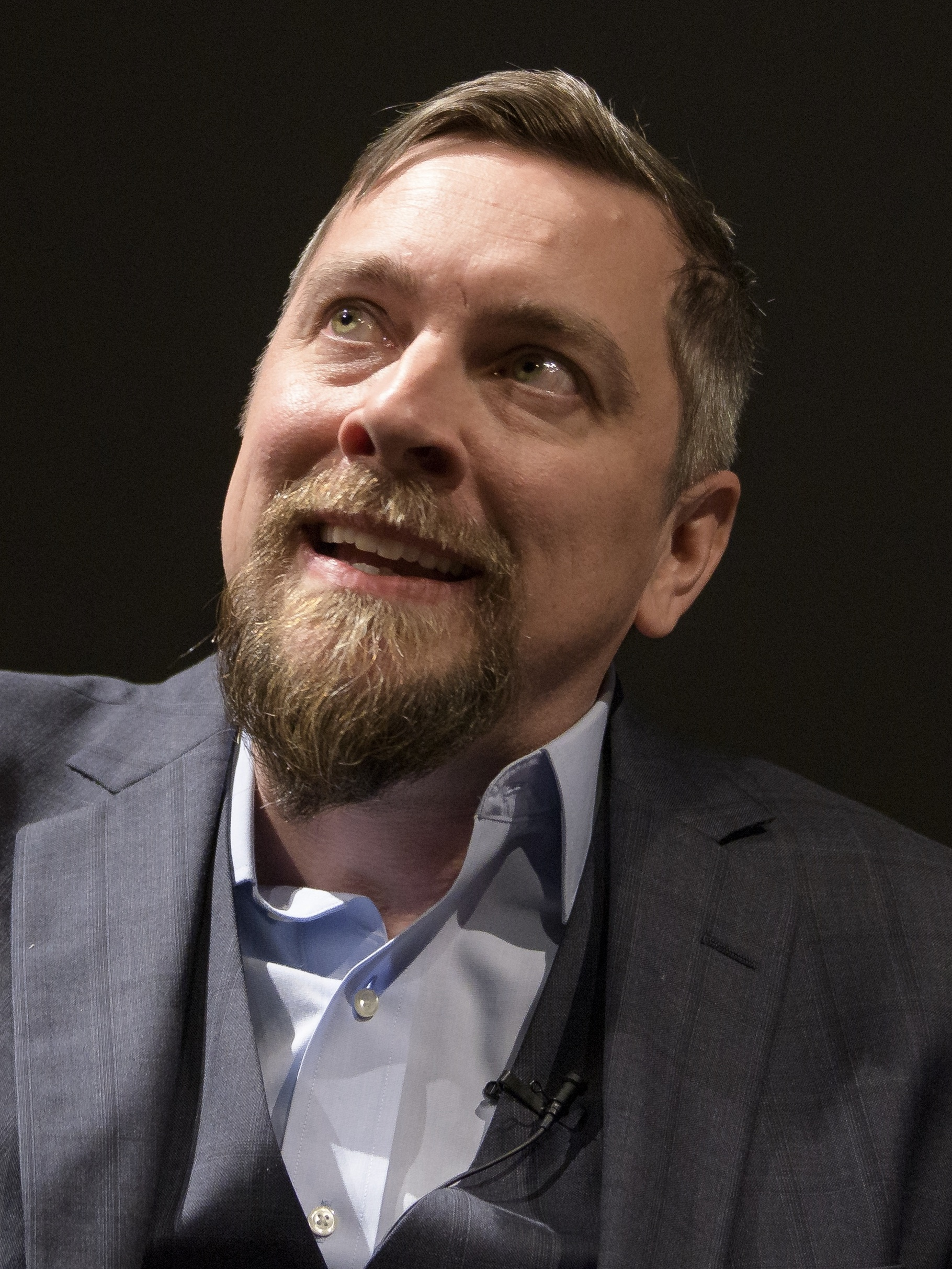
- Miller in 2019
- Occupation: Filmmaker
- Years active: 2001–present
- Known for: Dinosaur 13; Apollo 11

Todd Douglas Miller is an American filmmaker known for directing the documentary films Dinosaur 13 and Apollo 11.

== Early life and career ==
Miller grew up in Columbus, Ohio. In the 1990s, Miller attended the Motion Picture Institute in Detroit, Michigan and Eastern Michigan University.

He is a member of the Academy of Motion Picture Arts and Sciences.

== Filmography ==
Year	Title	Language	Director	Editor	Producer	Notes
2001	Gahanna Bill	English	Yes	No	Yes	As Todd Miller
2008	Scaring the Fish	English	Yes	Yes	Yes	As Todd Miller
2014	Dinosaur 13	English	Yes	Yes	Yes	Emmy Award
2019	Apollo 11	English	Yes	Yes	Yes	Primetime Emmy Award, Peabody, PGA, ACE, Critics' Choice and Sundance winner

== Accolades ==
- 2014 Sundance Film Festival - US Documentary Grand Jury Prize (nominated)
- 2014 Black Hills Film Festival - Best Documentary (won)
- 2015 News and Documentary Emmy Award - Outstanding Science and Technology Programming (won)
- 2019 Primetime Emmy Award for Outstanding Picture Editing For Nonfiction Programming (won)
- 2019 Primetime Emmy Award for Outstanding Directing for a Documentary/Nonfiction Program (nominated)
- 2019 Outstanding Producer of Documentary Theatrical Motion Pictures (won)
- 2019 Cinema Eye Honors - Outstanding Achievement in Editing (won)
- 2019 American Cinema Editors Awards - Best Edited Documentary (Feature) (won)
- 2019 Sundance Film Festival - Special Jury Award for Editing (won)
- 2019 Sundance Film Festival - US Documentary Grand Jury Prize (nominated)
- 2019 Stephen Hawking Medal for Science Communication - Film Community (won)
- 2019 Los Angeles Film Critics Association Awards - Best Editing (won)
- 2019 Critics' Choice Documentary Awards - Best Director (nominated)
- 2019 Critics' Choice Documentary Awards - Best Editing (won)
- 2019 Critics' Choice Documentary Awards - Best Documentary Feature (won)
- 2019 Critics' Choice Documentary Awards - Best Archival Documentary (won)
- 2019 Critics' Choice Documentary Awards - Best Science/Nature Documentary (won)
- 2019 Peabody Awards - Documentary (won)
- 2019 British Academy Film Awards - Best Documentary (nominated)
- 2019 Independent Spirit Awards - Best Documentary Feature (nominated)
