= Gregory Go Boom =

- Film poster
- Directed by: Janicza Bravo
- Written by: Janicza Bravo
- Produced by: Janicza Bravo; Deborah J. Chesebro; Brett Gelman
- Starring: Michael Cera; Brett Gelman; Sarah Burns
- Cinematography: Christian Sprenger
- Edited by: Janicza Bravo; Cine Bravo
- Music by: Heather Christian
- Production companies: Jash; CYRK Production
- Release date: May 23, 2013
- Running time: 18 minutes
- Country: United States
- Language: English

Gregory Go Boom is a 2013 comedy drama short film, written and directed by Janicza Bravo. The film premiered at Jash during YouTube Comedy Week on May 23, 2013.

The film later screened at 2014 Sundance Film Festival on January 17, 2014. It won the Grand Jury Prize for Narrative Short at the festival.

== Plot ==
Gregory, a paraplegic man, tries dating for the first time and discovers that life is very different than he had imagined.

== Cast ==
- Michael Cera as Gregory
- Brett Gelman as Tom
- Sarah Burns as Rose
- Anna Rose Hopkins as Summer / Cheyenne
- Stephanie Allynne as Willie
- Mireya Lucio as Crystal
- Nick Ortega as Carlos
- Holly Kaplan as Waitress

== Reception ==
Gregory Go Boom received mostly positive reviews from critics. Liana Maeby of HitFix praised Cera and the film by saying that Gregory is a good little short that's worth watching simply to see Michael Cera play a character that looks like "Napoleon Dynamite crossed with Yertle the Turtle." Derek Deskins of Lonely Reviewer, praised the film by saying that Gregory Go Boom is an interestingly dark and ominous short that will make you view Michael Cera completely differently."

== Accolades ==
Year	Award	Category	Recipient	Result
2014	Sundance Film Festival	Short Film Grand Jury Prize	Janicza Bravo	Nominated
2014	Sundance Film Festival	Short Film Jury Award: U.S. Fiction	Janicza Bravo	Won
