= Shored Up =

- Film poster
- Directed by: Ben Kalina
- Produced by: Ben Kalina
- Cinematography: Jen Schneider
- Edited by: Marc D'Agostino
- Music by: Paul Damian Hogan
- Production company: Mangrove Media
- Distributed by: Brainstorm Media
- Release dates: May 5, 2013 (Montclair Film Festival); January 17, 2014 (Sundance)
- Running time: 84 minutes
- Country: United States
- Language: English

Shored Up is a 2013 documentary film, produced and directed by Ben Kalina. The film premiered at 2013 Montclair Film Festival on May 5, 2013.

The Film broadcast on DirecTV on October 23, 2013. It had a theatrical release in United States on November 29, 2013. It won the Hilton Worldwide LightStay Sustainability Award (including $25,000 grant) at 2014 Sundance Film Festival.

The film was banned from screening at North Carolina Museum of Natural Sciences.

== Synopsis ==
The film explains the dangers of accelerating Sea-Level Rise through devastating effects of Hurricane Sandy.

== Reception ==
Shored Up received mostly positive reviews from critics. Geoff Berkshire of Variety praised the film by saying that "Ben Kalina's sturdy documentary debut delivers a sobering examination of the threat of rising sea levels." Neil Genzlinger of The New York Times, gave the film a positive review that "The film not only explores the fruitlessness of trying to stabilize shorelines that nature prefers to keep in flux, but it also looks at issues like who benefits from, and who pays for, these expensive efforts." Daphne Howland in her review for The Village Voice said that "Our seemingly innate desire to hang on to disappearing sand, which is essentially what our barrier islands are, is beautifully illustrated by the film's cinematography and historical footage."
