= God's Pocket =

- Theatrical release poster
- Directed by: John Slattery
- Written by: John Slattery; Alex Metcalf
- Based on: God's Pocket by Pete Dexter
- Produced by: Lance Acord; Jackie Kelman Bisbee; Sam Bisbee; Emily Ziff; Philip Seymour Hoffman; John Slattery
- Starring: Philip Seymour Hoffman; Richard Jenkins; Christina Hendricks; John Turturro; Eddie Marsan; Peter Gerety; Caleb Landry Jones; Domenick Lombardozzi; Joyce Van Patten
- Cinematography: Lance Acord
- Edited by: Tom McArdle
- Music by: Nathan Larson
- Production companies: Park Pictures; Cooper's Town Productions; Shoestring Pictures
- Distributed by: IFC Films
- Release dates: January 17, 2014 (Sundance Film Festival); May 9, 2014 (United States)
- Running time: 88 minutes
- Country: United States
- Language: English
- Box office: $170,000

God's Pocket is a 2014 American drama film directed by John Slattery, his feature film directorial debut. Slattery co-wrote the screenplay with Alex Metcalf, based on the 1983 novel of the same name by Pete Dexter. The film stars Philip Seymour Hoffman, John Turturro, Christina Hendricks, and Richard Jenkins. The film premiered at the 2014 Sundance Film Festival to mixed critical reviews, and was picked up for domestic distribution by IFC Films. The film is set in a poor working class South Philadelphia neighborhood modeled on Devil's Pocket, but filmed in Yonkers, New York, and New Jersey.

Hoffman died within two weeks of the film's premiere at Sundance's 2014 U.S. Dramatic Competition.

== Plot ==
Mickey Scarpato and wife Jeanie attend the funeral of Leon, her son and his stepson. In a voice-over, alcoholic journalist Richard Shelburn reads from his column about the "working men of God's Pocket".

Three days earlier, we see Mickey having sex with Jeanie as Leon takes pills before going to his job as a day laborer. While at work during lunch hour, Leon racially taunts an older African-American worker while brandishing a knife. The man bashes Leon on the head, killing him. Later, the workers at the site tell the police the death was an accident.

Mickey, Arthur, and Sal have arranged to steal a truck filled with meat by paying off the truck's driver. Sal punches the driver for being too curious. After the theft, a power outage leads to problems about where to store the meat. Arthur explains to Mickey that he owes Sal "20 large".

Back at home, Jeanie tells Mickey that Leon is dead but she does not believe it was an accident.

In his office, Richard, who is drinking, is told by his editor that he missed 42 days of work last year. At a bar, Richard meets an aspiring young journalist, whom he takes to bed, but cannot perform because he has had too many drinks.

At a bar run by McKenna, Mickey receives condolences on the death of his stepson. McKenna tells him they're collecting money for the funeral, which will turn out to be the $1,440.

Mickey makes arrangements for Leon with funeral director "Smilin' Jack" Moran, but worries about the expense. Jack insists Jeannie would not want something cheap.

At McKenna's bar, the patrons complain about errors in the newspaper story about Leon's death. Richard is assigned by his editor to cover the story; when he later visits McKenna's bar, he is warmly received by the patrons.

Mickey tells Alfred that Jeanie has doubts about the official cause of Leon's death, and Alfred asks Sal for help. Sal sends two men to the worksite to pressure the workers. However, they find only the foreman, alone, who fights back and gouges out the eye of one of the men.

At an off-track betting site, Mickey advises Alfred to bet on a horse named Turning Leaf. Alfred is worried about the #6 horse in the race. Alfred's concerns prove to be correct as the #6 horse wins and Mickey loses a lot of money.

Richard visits Jeanie for his story and immediately falls for her. He invites her to his place by the lake, and she goes because she hopes that he will investigate Leon's death. At a picnic near the lake, Richard talks about how much he is admired in the city. On the ride home, he tells Jeanie he loves her, but she appears indifferent to him.

Smilin' Jack and Mickey argue over money at the funeral home and get into a physical fight. Jack apologizes but locks Mickey outside with Leon's corpse. Mickey puts Leon's body in his truck. When Mickey goes to sell the meat from the theft, the buyer refuses it after seeing the corpse in the truck with the meat.

Sal and an accomplice visit the flower shop run by Aunt Sophie in search of Arthur, who Sal blames for the attack on the men (one of whom was his cousin). Protecting Arthur, Sophie shoots both men dead and calls the police, claiming they were trying to rob her store.

Mickey tries to sell his truck for money to pay for the funeral services. He does not want the buyer to see what's in the back. When the buyer's employee takes the truck for a test drive, Mickey chases the truck on foot. Seeing Mickey in chase, the driver runs a red light, causing a crash that spills meat and Leon's corpse onto the street.

Mickey forces the buyer to give him six grand for the truck. He uses the money to pay Smilin' Jack, but Leon's body is back in the morgue.

At the bar, a patron tells Mickey that everyone thinks Richard and Jeanie are sleeping together.

The movie then returns to its opening sequence. In a voice-over, Richard calls people of the Pocket "dirty faced and uneducated."

Richard returns to McKenna's bar but is told he is unwelcome. The patrons think his article insulted them. Despite his insistence that he's on their side, a group of men drag him outside to beat him. Mickey tries to protect Richard, but is told by McKenna "you ain't from here either." Richard is beaten as Jeanie watches from her house across the street.

Mickey visits Arthur and Sophie in Florida, where they are hiding after she killed Sal.

== Cast ==
- Philip Seymour Hoffman as Mickey Scarpato
- Richard Jenkins as Richard Shelburn
- Christina Hendricks as Jeanie Scarpato
- John Turturro as Arthur "Bird" Capezio
- Eddie Marsan as "Smilin' Jack" Moran
- Peter Gerety as McKenna
- Caleb Landry Jones as Leon Hubbard
- Domenick Lombardozzi as Sal Cappi
- Joyce Van Patten as Aunt Sophie
- Molly Price as Joanie
- Bridget Barkan as Joyce
- Lenny Venito as truck buyer
- Glenn Fleshler as Coleman Peets
- Arthur French as 'Old Lucy'
- Matthew Lawler
- Danny Mastrogiorgio
- Eddie McGee as Petey Kearns

== Reception ==
God's Pocket received mixed reviews from critics. On Rotten Tomatoes, the film has a rating of 36% based on 101 reviews, with an average score of 5.45/10. The website's critical consensus reads: "Well-cast but frustratingly clichéd, God's Pocket fails to strike a sensible balance between comedy and drama." On Metacritic, the film received a score of 51 out of 100, based on 27 critics, indicating "mixed or average" reviews.

The Hollywood Reporter called it a "half-good effort" that lacked the "snap, precision and stylistic smarts a mixed-tone project like this requires." Screen International called it "too shaggy and tonally inconsistent to hold together." Stephanie Merry from the Washington Post said, "What began as an intriguing snapshot begins to feel grotesque and inscrutable."

The film received some positive reviews from notable critics. Richard Roeper said, "John Slattery's direction is skilled and steady... Great actors at the top of their game working with rich material." David Edelstein of Vulture said, "Slattery adapted the book with Alex Metcalf and gets the tone just right. The film is damnably amusing." In a Sundance first-look review, The Guardian gave the film 4 out of 5 stars. The New York Post said the film was "crafted with great skill".

== Release ==
IFC Films gave the film a limited release on May 9, 2014. Domestically, the film's widest release was in 80 theaters, generating only $170,000 in box office.

Arrow Films acquired the UK rights and Electric Entertainment handled the international rights.
