= Janicza Bravo =

American writer, director, and photographer

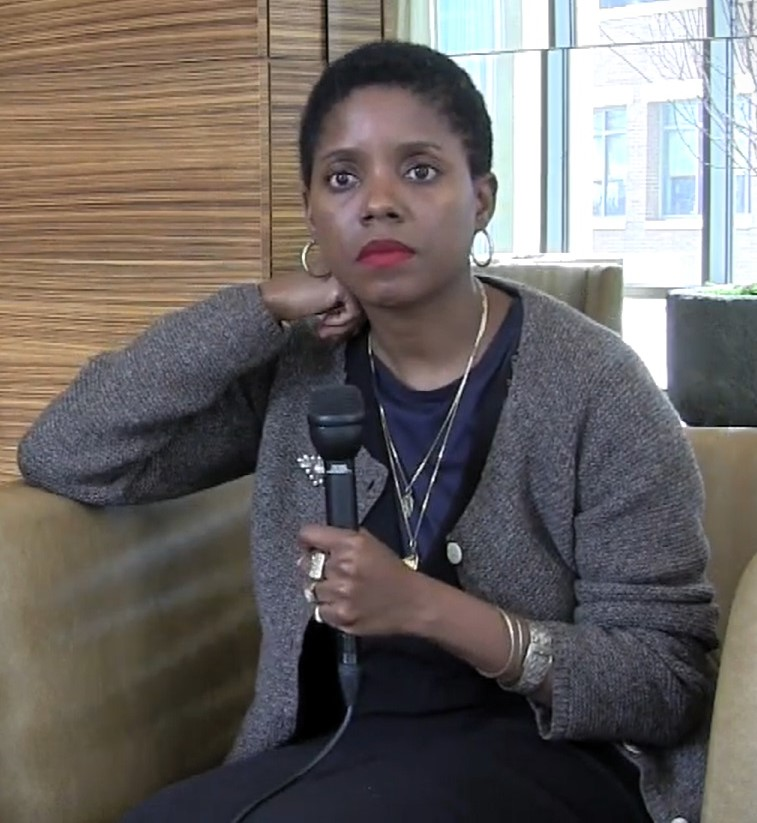
- Bravo in 2017
- Born: New York City, U.S.
- Education: New York University
- Occupations: Film director; film producer; screenwriter
- Years active: 2010–present
- Notable work: Gregory Go Boom (2013); Lemon (2017); Zola (2021)
- Spouse: Brett Gelman (m. 2015; div. 2018)

Janicza Bravo (/dʒəˈnɪksə/) is an American film director, film producer, and screenwriter. Her films include Gregory Go Boom, a winner of the short-film jury award at the Sundance Film Festival; Lemon, co-written with Brett Gelman; and Zola, co-written with playwright Jeremy O. Harris.

== Early life and education ==
Bravo was born in New York City, the daughter of Ana María Ford and Rafael Ángel Landers. Her parents, who are tailors, are both from Colón, Panama. Her mother enlisted in the U.S. military when Bravo was an infant. From the time she was three months old to a teenager, she grew up between Colón and an Army base in Panama City, Panama, until her family moved back to the United States. She spent time going back and forth between the United States and Panama throughout her childhood. When she was 12, her family moved to Crown Heights, Brooklyn.

Bravo attended the Playwrights Horizons Theater School of the New York University Tisch School of the Arts, where she majored in directing and design for theater, which included costume and set design.

Several years after college, she moved to Los Angeles, worked as a stylist and produced small theater productions before she was approached by a cinematographer who offered assistance with filmmaking.

== Career ==
After graduating from college Bravo worked as a stylist and wardrobe designer.

Bravo got her start writing and directing a series of short films. Her first film, Eat, starred Katherine Waterston and Brett Gelman and debuted at the 2011 SXSW Film Festival and was picked up by Vice. The film told the story of a woman who is locked out of her apartment and meets an odd neighbor.

Her second film, the 2013 dark comedy named Gregory Go Boom, won the short-film jury award at the Sundance Film Festival and featured Michael Cera as a paraplegic who lives near the Salton Sea. The film was shot on location in Bombay Beach and Slab City, California. Bravo worked with JASH to produce and release the film online. The film's title was inspired by the 1976 François Truffaut film, Small Change, where the boy falls out the window yet survives.

Her third short film, 2014's Pauline Alone, features Gaby Hoffmann as a Craigslist-obsessed woman. In 2014, she was named one of Filmmaker magazine's "25 New Faces of Independent Film".

In 2015, Bravo shot a featurette on Victoria Beckham for Glamour's 25th Anniversary Women of the Year Awards called "Victoria Beckham Is Living a Life Filled with Style and Grace".

In 2016, Bravo released the short film, Hard World for Small Things, a live-action virtual reality film that was a "day in the life" depiction of South Central. The project was grant funded by Eve Cohen and James Kaelan of Seed and Spark. The film was inspired by the death of a cousin, visiting from Panama, who in the summer of 1999 was asphyxiated by the police in the Flatbush neighborhood of Brooklyn is a case of mistaken identity. It was shot using GoPro cameras for the virtual reality company Wevr, and was shown at the Sundance Film Festival, Tribeca Film Festival, and the AFI Festival Los Angeles. The title of the film was inspired by a line of dialog in the 1955 film noir film, The Night of the Hunter, and marked a distinct departure in theme, as it focused on race and politics.

Also in 2016, Bravo took the short, Woman in Deep, to the 2016 SXSW Film Festival. The film stars Alison Pill and was grant-funded via The Nantucket Project.

In 2016, Bravo directed her first feature, an independent film called Lemon, which she co-wrote with then-husband Brett Gelman. The film stars Gelman, Michael Cera, and Judy Greer, and includes performances by Nia Long, Fred Melamed, Shiri Appleby, Rhea Perlman, David Paymer, Gillian Jacobs, Megan Mullally, Martin Starr, Jeff Garlin, and Marla Gibbs. After a somewhat turbulent pre-production process, the film was picked up by Killer Films and Burn Later Productions and premiered at Sundance in 2017.

In addition to creating her own work, Bravo directed season 1 episode 9, "Juneteenth", of the FX television show Atlanta, which stars and was created by Donald Glover, as well as season 3 episode 5, "Bertie's Birthday", of the Netflix television show Love, which was created by and stars Paul Rust. For the Amazon series The New Yorker Presents, she directed and co-adapted a short film based on Hallie Cantor's story "Couple's First Dinner Party, Serves Six," starring Tunde Adebimpe, Jon Daly, Brett Gelman, Alia Shawkat, Hannah Simone, and Michaela Watkins.

Bravo's latest film, Zola, was directed and co-written by Bravo, along with playwright Jeremy O. Harris. The film is based on a 148-tweet thread by Detroit waitress Aziah "Zola" Wells about a trip she took to Florida with a sex worker named Jessica. Zola had its world premiere at the 2020 Sundance Film Festival, where it was nominated for the Grand Jury Award.

In 2022, Bravo was one of nine directors commissioned to design a series of rooms at the Metropolitan Museum of Art for the exhibition In America: An Anthology of Fashion.

In March 2025 she directed the acclaimed "Worms" episode of The Bear.

In April 2026, it was announced that Bravo will direct Good Thing, a biographical film about Martha Stewart.

== Personal life ==
Bravo speaks Spanish fluently and is Afro Latina.

In December 2015, Bravo married her long-time boyfriend, actor Brett Gelman. Gelman and Bravo met in New York City while working on a New York Lotto commercial. In 2016, they resided in Los Angeles. They divorced in 2018.

== Awards ==
- 2014: Sundance Film Festival, Short Film Grand Jury Prize (nominated) – Gregory Go Boom
- 2014: Sundance Film Festival, Short Film Jury Award: US Fiction – Gregory Go Boom
- 2026: Bravo won a Gracie Award from the Alliance for Women in Media Foundation for best Director – Comedy for "Worms."

Organizations	Year	Category	Work	Result	Ref.
Directors Guild of America Awards	2026	Outstanding Directing – Comedy Series	The Bear (for "Worms")	Nominated	

== Filmography ==
=== Film ===
Year	Title	Director	Writer	Producer	Editor	Notes
2011	Eat	Yes	Yes	No	Yes	Short
2013	Gregory Go Boom	Yes	Yes	Yes	Yes	Short
2014	Pauline Alone	Yes	Yes	Yes	Yes	Short
2015	Woman of the Year	Yes	No	No	No	Short
2016	Hard World for Small Things	Yes	Yes	Yes	No	Short
2016	Woman in Deep	Yes	Yes	Yes	No	Short
2016	Man Rots From the Head	Yes	Yes	Yes	No	Short
2017	Lemon	Yes	Yes	Yes	No	
2017	Hell In The Afternoon	Yes	Yes	Yes	No	Short
2020	Zola	Yes	Yes	No	No	
2022	Women's Tales: House Comes With a Bird	Yes	Yes	No	No	Miu Miu short
2026	Is God Is	No	No	Yes	No	
TBA	Preppy †	Yes	No	Yes	No	Filming

=== Television ===
Year	Title	Director	Writer	Producer	Notes
2015	Hot Package	No	Yes	No	5 episodes
2016	The New Yorker Presents	Yes	Yes	No	Episode: "Couple's First Dinner Party, Serves Six"
2016	Atlanta	Yes	No	No	Episode: "Juneteenth"
2018	Divorce	Yes	No	No	Episode: "Ohio"
2018	Love	Yes	No	No	Episode: "Bertie's Birthday"
2018	Here and Now	Yes	No	No	Episode: "Yes"
2018	Dear White People	Yes	No	No	Episode: "Volume 2: Chapter IX"
2018	Forever	Yes	No	No	2 episodes
2020	Mrs. America	Yes	No	No	Episode: "Houston"
2020	Little America	No	Story	No	Episode: "The Cowboy"
2021	In Treatment	Yes	No	No	4 episodes
2021	Them	Yes	No	No	Episode: "Covenant I."
2022	Kindred	Yes	No	Executive	Directed episode: "Dana"
2023	Poker Face	Yes	No	No	Episode: "The Hook"
2024	The Listeners	Yes	No	Executive	Directed 4 episodes
2025	The Bear	Yes	No	No	Episode: "Worms"
2025	Too Much	Yes	No	No	Episode: "One Wedding and a Sex Pest"

=== Acting roles ===
Year	Title	Role	Notes
2013	In a World...	Snacks	
2017	Love	Lorna	Episode: "Friends Night Out"
2018	Camping	Nina-Joy	8 episodes
2019	Greener Grass	Marriott	
2020	Fully Realized Humans	Mare	
2022	Sharp Stick	Mercedes	
2025	Too Much	Kim Keith Independiente	5 episodes
