= Disobedience (disambiguation) =

Civil disobedience is the active, professed refusal to obey certain laws, demands, and commands of a government, or of an occupying international power.

Disobedience may also refer to:

- Disobedience (2003 film), a drama directed by Licínio Azevedo, starring Rosa Castigo
- Disobedience (novel), by Naomi Alderman
  - Disobedience (2017 film), a film adaptation of the novel, directed by Sebastián Lelio and starring Rachel Weisz
- Disobedience: Chris T-T Sings A.A. Milne, a 2011 album from Chris T-T
- "Disobedience", a song by KMFDM from their 1995 album Nihil

== See also ==
- Disobedient (disambiguation)
- Insubordination
