= Of God and Dogs =

- Directed by: Abounaddara Collective
- Screenplay by: Abounaddara Collective
- Produced by: Abounaddara Collective
- Release date: January 18, 2014 (Sundance)
- Running time: 12 minutes
- Country: Syria
- Language: Arabic

Of God and Dogs is a 2014 documentary short film, directed by Abounaddara Collective. Abounaddara Collective is a Damascus based independent film company that specializes in documentaries.

The film later screened at 2014 Sundance Film Festival on January 18, 2014. It won the Grand Jury Prize at the festival. The film later screened at 2014 Sundance London Film Festival on April 26, 2014.

== Synopsis ==
The film narrates the story of a soldier, who had killed an innocent man and now seeks vengeance from God.

== Accolades ==
Year	Award	Category	Recipient	Result
2014	Sundance Film Festival	Short Film Grand Jury Prize	Abounaddara Collective	Won
