= Alive Inside: A Story of Music and Memory =

Alive Inside
- Promotional poster
- Directed by: Michael Rossato-Bennett
- Written by: Michael Rossato-Bennett
- Produced by: Michael Rossato-Bennett; Alexandra McDougald; Regina Scully
- Cinematography: Shachar Langlev
- Edited by: Mark Demolar; Michael Rossato-Bennett; Manuel Tsingaris
- Music by: Itaal Shur
- Production company: Projector Media
- Distributed by: Projector Media; BOND/360; City Drive Films
- Release dates: January 18, 2014 (Sundance); July 18, 2014 (United States)
- Running time: 78 minutes
- Country: United States
- Language: English
- Box office: $250,200

Alive Inside: A Story of Music and Memory is a 2014 American documentary film directed and produced by Michael Rossato-Bennett. The film premiered in the competition category of U.S. Documentary Competition program at the 2014 Sundance Film Festival on January 18, 2014. It won the Audience Award: U.S. Documentary at the festival. The documentary explores diseases that impair neurological function, such as Alzheimer's disease and dementia, and proposes a treatment option that is claimed to improve a patient's quality of life. It discusses that the elderly community are on the decline in social status and that western society neglects old age to idealize youth. It includes a series of interviews with individuals on neurology, geriatrics, and music. The documentary tells the story of patients and their experience with music and creating personalized playlists for elderly patients with dementia and Alzheimer's disease based on their music preferences.

== Plot summary and cast ==
Henry: He was a 94-year-old nursing home resident with dementia. After engaging with music, he claimed to become more animated, recalling aspects of his past he had not been able to answer before. Neurologist Oliver Sacks quotes the German philosopher Immanuel Kant stating that "music is the quickening art" to explain that Henry had been brought to life by the music being presented to him.

Gill: He was a nursing home resident that would become agitated at his loss of freedom and would not take his medication as prescribed. After the music intervention, Gill was depicted as being much happier, because as G. Allen Power, a geriatrician stated, "music creates spontaneity that you cannot create in an institution".

Denise: She was a patient diagnosed with bipolar-schizophrenia that had been a resident of her facility for two years. After the music intervention, she is taped setting aside the walker she had been using for the entire duration of her stay at the nursing home and dancing. She was visited by a volunteer musician, Samite Mulondo, who described the music as an outlet to release her frustrations.

Steve: He was a patient with multiple sclerosis whose childhood and adulthood was filled with his love for music and the instruments he played. He said that moving to his facility left him isolated from that part of his life. After being introduced to music, he stated, "after 8 years I finally had the opportunity to get my music".

John: He was a WWII veteran with severe dementia. He had a background as a performer when he was a young adult. Prior to experiencing the music, he was very quiet and remained quite still, and could not recognize younger photos of himself. After the music intervention, he began to sing along to the music and dance in his wheelchair.

Mary Lou: A woman with Alzheimer's whose husband was her caregiver. She feared being sent to a nursing home as her disease progressed. She had difficulty formulating words and often lost her train of thought. After experiencing the music intervention, she explained about how she felt when listening to the music: "it can't escape me if I am in this place".

Nell: She had severe dementia and her husband, Norman, had been her caregiver for ten years. She did not use medication. He had been playing music and believed the music is what had kept her from long-term care in a facility.

== Production ==
A kickstarter crowdfunding project to finish the film and develop an app was formed in 2012.

After its premiere at the Sundance Film Festival, BOND/360 did a service publicity deal for the theatrical distribution of the film. The film was released on July 18, 2014, in the United States. The film was released on DVD and Blu-ray Disc. The film ran on Netflix for 3 years and then on Amazon Prime. It has since been released on Vimeo.

== Reception ==
The film received mostly positive responses from critics. Rob Nelson in his review for Variety said that "Michael Rossato-Bennett captures some amazingly transformative results in the treatment of dementia through music." He writes that the "over-the-top narration often sounds cloying and banal," but Nelson endorses the medical and historical context of the film. Duane Byrge of The Hollywood Reporter gave the film a positive review, saying it was "A gloriously inspirational film documenting music's healing power in Alzheimer patients." He says the director has a "sharp cinematic scalpel", revealing the "magic in the music". Steve Greene from Indiewire said that "Alive Inside provides a sense of idealism amid bleak situations. When discussing the impact of music on an environment so often typified by isolation, one of the patients describes his desire for freedom." He says the film is "scattered but moving", adding that "The most potent emotional response comes from the mixture of joy, gratitude and recognition of the passage of time visible on a handful of respondents' faces as they're experiencing a song from their younger days." He says the film's shortcoming is that the moments of watching the subjects enjoy the magic of music are too often "relegated to part of a longer montage or used merely to enforce an industry professional's point", and that the subtitled "nod to Cohen's organization [is] ... where the film loses focus".

== Awards and honors ==
- 2014 : 2014 Sundance Film Festival, Audience Award: U.S. Documentary
- 2014 : Hotdocs - Canadian International Documentary Festival - Toronto (Canada) - Nomination
