= Dinosaur 13 =

- Sundance Film poster
- Directed by: Todd Douglas Miller
- Produced by: Todd Douglas Miller
- Cinematography: Thomas Petersen
- Edited by: Todd Douglas Miller
- Music by: Matt Morton
- Production companies: CNN Films; Statement Pictures
- Distributed by: Lionsgate
- Release date: January 16, 2014 (Sundance)
- Running time: 100 minutes
- Country: United States
- Language: English

Dinosaur 13 is a 2014 American documentary film directed and produced by Todd Douglas Miller. The film premiered in competition category of U.S. Documentary Competition program at the 2014 Sundance Film Festival on January 16, 2014.

After its premiere at the Sundance Film Festival, CNN Films and Lionsgate acquired distribution rights of the film, leading to broadcast on CNN, theatrical release, and DVD packaging. In 2015 Dinosaur 13 won the Emmy for Outstanding Science and Technology Programming at the 36th Annual News and Documentary Emmy Awards.

== Plot ==
The film depicts events that began in 1990, when American paleontologist Sue Hendrickson working with Pete Larson and his Black Hills Institute of Geological Research team discovered the largest and most complete Tyrannosaurus rex skeleton ever found (nicknamed "Sue") while digging in the badlands near Faith, South Dakota. The skeleton was seized from the institute by the federal government, followed by a 10-year-long battle with the FBI, the National Park Service, the Bureau of Indian Affairs, and Maurice Williams, the landowner on whose property the bones were discovered. Pete Larson also spent 18 months in prison, on unrelated charges of customs violations.

== Reception ==
The film received positive response from critics. On review aggregator website Rotten Tomatoes, the film has an approval rating of 73% based on reviews from 49 critics, with an average rating of 6.2/10. The site's critics consensus states: "It's undeniably slanted and doesn't cover as much of the story as it should, but Dinosaur 13 makes for gripping documentary viewing, flaws and all". On Metacritic, the film has a score of 66 out of a 100 based on 27 critics, indicating "generally favorable" reviews.

Dennis Harvey, in his review for Variety, called the documentary "engrossing". Duane Byrge of The Hollywood Reporter gave the film positive review and said that it involves a "story of scientific discovery and petty politics". Eric Kohn from Indiewire in his review said that "A subset of the recent scientific-documentary-as-thriller tradition epitomized by The Cove and Blackfish, Todd Douglas Miller's Dinosaur 13 is both awe-inspiring and tragic".

Donald Clarke of The Irish Times had praised the ending of Dinosaur 13 calling it "bittersweet" and "genuinely unfair", adding plainly and simply "Do not miss [it]".

Tom Huddleston of Time Out wrote "Using home-video footage and talking-head interviews, [the film] dramatically depicts the thrill of archaeological discovery".

According to Andrew O'Hehir of Salon.com Dinosaur 13 has the "elements of legal thriller, political drama, academic throwdown and scientific geek-out [all-in-one].

Kim Newman of the Empire also praised the film, saying that "[Similar to] The Cover and Man on Wire, this doc[umentary] comes clad in the garb of a thriller. And a heck of a good one at that".

Even though the film was praised by critics, Rob Staeger of The Village Voice was of a different opinion. His verdict was that "Unfortunately, Dinosaur 13 never manages to display the story's many complex parts in a way that enables viewers to grasp the whole beast".

After the film aired, The Society of Vertebrate Paleontology, a society of professional paleontologists that depends largely on government grants for research, issued a statement of full support for legally protecting fossils on public land and criticized Dinosaur 13 for implying that government ownership of fossil specimens impedes paleontological science.

Following its release on Blu-ray, the film was reviewed by Brian Orndorf of Blu-ray.com, who said that "If The Cove and Blackfish taught us anything, it's that documentaries don't necessarily require facts and figures to support a subject matter".

== Bibliography ==
- Hornaday, Ann (August 14, 2014). "'Dinosaur 13' movie review: Whose T. rex is it, anyway?". The Washington Post.
- Turan, Kenneth (August 14, 2014). "Review 'Dinosaur 13' richly details how huge find devolved into grief". Los Angeles Times.
