= Happiness (2013 film) =

2013 documentary film by Thomas Balmès

- Promotional poster
- Directed by: Thomas Balmès
- Written by: Thomas Balmès
- Produced by: Thomas Balmès; Kaarle Aho; Juliette Guigon; Patrick Winocour
- Cinematography: Thomas Balmès; Nina Bernfeld
- Edited by: Alex Cardon; Ronan Sinquin
- Music by: Sea Power
- Production companies: Arte France; ITVS International; TBC Productions; Quark Films; Making Movies Oy
- Release date: November 2013 (International Documentary Festival Amsterdam)
- Running time: 80 minutes
- Countries: France; Finland
- Language: English

Happiness is a 2013 French-Finnish documentary film written, directed and produced by Thomas Balmès. The film had its world premiere at International Documentary Festival Amsterdam in November 2013 and premiered in-competition at the 2014 Sundance Film Festival on 17 January 2014. It won the Documentary World Cinema Cinematography Award at the festival.

The film premiered at 2014 Thessaloniki Documentary Festival in Views of the World section, on 16 March 2014. It also premiered at 2014 San Francisco International Film Festival on 27 April 2014.

== Synopsis ==
In 1999, when Jigme Singye Wangchuck authorized television and the Internet throughout Bhutan, it had a rapid impact on the country. The film follows events through the eyes of an eight year old monk named Peyangki, praying eagerly for a TV set in Laya, the last village in Bhutan to be connected to the internet and global media.

== Reception ==
Happiness received generally positive reviews upon its premiere at the 2014 Sundance Film Festival. Stephen Farber in his review for The Hollywood Reporter wrote of the film, "Striking images of a Himalayan mountain village invigorate this award-winning doc." Dan Nailen of Salt Lake Magazine criticized the film by saying, "Happiness is far from perfect, and is somewhat predictable in its view that technology doesn't have the answers for a poor remote village," but ultimately adds, "Still, the joy of watching Peyangki mature as a monk while keeping his playful spirit is undeniable, and the film offers a glimpse into a world rarely seen by Westerners. It's well worth the time spent delving into Peyangki's world."

== Accolades ==
Year	Award	Category	Recipient	Result
2014	Sundance Film Festival	World Cinema Grand Jury Prize: Documentary	Thomas Balmès	Nominated
2014	Sundance Film Festival	Cinematography Award: World Cinema Documentary	Thomas Balmès and Nina Bernfeld	Won
2014	Sheffield International Documentary Festival	Sheffield Youth Jury Award - Special Mention	Thomas Balmès	Won
2014	Sheffield International Documentary Festival	Sheffield Youth Jury Award	Thomas Balmès	Nominated
