= The Nightowls =

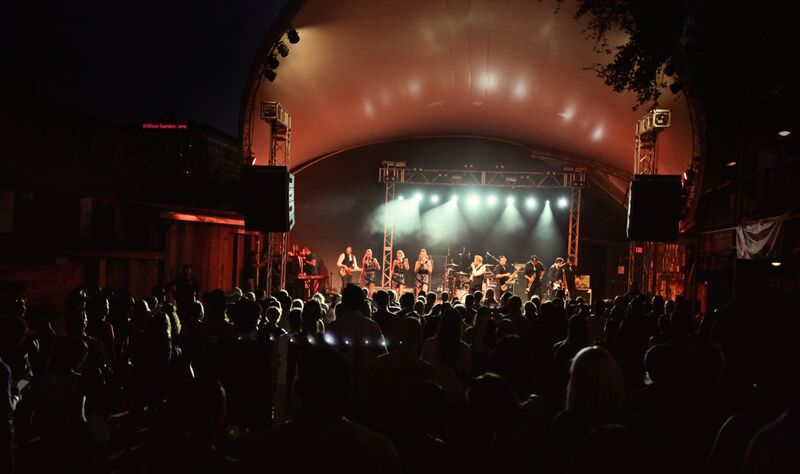
- The Nightowls performing at Stubbs in Austin in 2015

Background information
- Origin: Austin, Texas, United States
- Genres: Soul, R&B, Funk
- Years active: 2011–present
- Label: Nine Mile Records
- Members: Ryan Harkrider; Kamilla Lamar; Rob Alton; Andrew McLemore; Rydog Johnson; Zol Waterhouse; Vince Wiley; Luke Scallan; Justin Hights; Billie Bravo
- Past members: Tara Williamson; Ben Petree; Ellie Carroll; Javier Stuppard; Michael Rey; Amos Trystman; Sara Stein
- Website: http://www.wearethenightowls.com

The Nightowls are an American musical group from Austin, Texas, whose debut album Good As Gold was named Top 10 of the 2014 Austin Music Awards Albums of the Year. Their sound combines R&B, Funk and soul music. Lead singer and multi-instrumentalist Ryan Harkrider formed The Nightowls in 2011. His song "Nobody Ever Wants to Leave" was commissioned in 2009 by The Austin Convention and Visitor's Bureau as Austin's official theme song. The Nightowls have released three full-length albums and two EP's. Two of which were recorded at the iconic Soul/R&B studios - FAME Studios in Muscle Shoals, Alabama and Royal Studios in Memphis, Tennessee.

== Career ==
=== Good as Gold ===
The Nightowls released their debut album, Good as Gold, in December 2013. On January 7, 2014, The Nightowls released "Good as Gold" as a single. In a review of Good as Gold, Cashbox described The Nightowls as a soul band rooted in the Motown sound but able to move in new directions. Indie Music said The Nightowls sound like a band straight out of the glorious R&B past, paying homage to all artist of that era while adding a modern spin. The Nightowls recorded an arrangement of Harkrider's song "Nobody Ever Wants to Leave" for Good as Gold B-Sides, a 4-song EP, released in September 2014.

In October 2014, The Nightowls were scheduled to perform at the Austin City Limits Music Festival on the second weekend, but were canceled due to rainy weather. In March 2015, The Nightowls performed at the SXSW Music Festival as a showcase artist.

In 2015, the band was highlighted as "a band to watch" by Austin Monthly Magazine. Good as Gold was released on vinyl in May 2015.

=== Fame Sessions ===
Fame Sessions, their second album, was released September 4, 2015 on Super Sonic Sounds (a subsidiary of Nine Mile Records). It was recorded at FAME Studios in Muscle Shoals, Alabama, in collaboration with David Hood and Spooner Oldham from the original FAME (Florence Alabama Music Enterprises) Studios house band The Swampers.

On July 20, 2015, The Nightowls released "Get Up!" – the first single from Fame Sessions. The video for "Get Up!" premiered in Texas Monthly Magazine on July 17, 2015. and has been uploaded to YouTube. On August 3, 2015 The Nightowls released “Highline” – the second single from Fame Sessions. On August 27, 2015 they released "Nobody But You" as a third single. In a positive review of Fame Sessions on September 4, 2015, Elmore Magazine described their music as being based on the Aretha Franklin, Wilson Picket type of sound with a more youthful, modern spin. In a review of Fame Sessions, Proper Music Distribution described their sound as being firmly rooted in the history of southern soul music and pays tribute to FAME Studios greats like Duane Allman and Percy Sledge.

In September through December 2015 The Nightowls toured for the first time throughout the United States. In October 2015, The Nightowls performed at the Austin City Limits Music Festival, having been rained out in 2014. In March 2016, The Nightowls performed at the SXSW Music Festival as a Showcase Artist.

=== Royal Sessions ===
In December 2015, The Nightowls recorded Royal Sessions, a five track EP at the iconic Royal Studios in Memphis, Tennessee. In April 2016, The Nightowls went to Sun Studio in Memphis, Tennessee and taped a segment for Season 8 of the Public Broadcasting System (PBS) Television network program – Sun Studio Sessions. Season 8 began airing across the United States in January 2017.

On April 18, 2016 The Nightowls released "Clean It Up (Play It By The Rules)" as a single from the EP on Baeble Music. Describing it as a “certifiable party jam that moves your body as much as it moves the part of your brain conditioned to love old school soul.” On May 25, 2016 The Nightowls released “Right Around The Corner” as a second single from Royal Sessions in Paste Magazine. In their review of the single, The 3rd single, “Can’t Bring Me Down” premiered in Glide Magazine on June 21, 2016. The article describes The Nightowls as being able to effortlessly meld Memphis and Motown with modern pop music, making for something that even fans of more mainstream fare like Fitz and the Tantrums will enjoy. Royal Sessions was released on July 15, 2016. In its review of Royal Sessions, Innocent Words Magazine says “It’s as if they found grandma’s secret recipe… you mix a little bit of funk with a little soul and a whole lotta rhythm and blues, and you get this delicious treat.” The video for "Right Around The Corner" premiered in The Huffington Post on August 5, 2016 and has been uploaded to YouTube.

The Nightowls toured the West Coast of the United States in August 2016 in support of Royal Sessions. In October 2016 they toured throughout the East Coast of the United States. In April 2017, The Nightowls performed at the Motorcycle Grand Prix of the Americas at the Circuit of the Americas racetrack. In July 2017, The Nightowls toured the East Coast of the United States for the 3rd time. In August 2017, The Nightowls toured throughout the Midwest of the United States for the 1st time. On August 31, 2017, The Nightowls performed at Prince's Paisley Park in Minneapolis-Saint Paul, Minnesota, as one of the finalist in their “Musicology 2017" Battle of the Bands competition.

In March 2018, The Nightowls performed 2 showcases at the 2018 SXSW Music Festival in Austin, Texas. In an interview during SXSW with Shockya News, frontman Ryan Harkrider talked about the evolution of the band's sound over the past 2 years. “We used to be more of a retro-vintage-soul band. Everything we do is rooted in dance and having a good time. But now we also have elements of R&B and funk. But we’re still a big 10-piece soul band that’s all about having a good time."

=== We Are The Nightowls ===
On April 27, 2018 The Nightowls released their 3rd full-length album We Are The Nightowls on Nine Mile Records. Most of the album was written in 2017 following extensive touring in support of their 2016 EP Royal Sessions. In an interview in Glide Magazine on March 27, 2018 frontman Ryan Harkrider says “Our previous 2 albums were concept albums that paid homage to the historic recording studios in which they were recorded. This new album is more about capturing the band’s sound, it’s more of an updated, cohesive statement about who we are”. We Are The Nightowls has been well received. In their May 10, 2018 review of the album, Indie Voice said, “With its flawless, upbeat, high energy and downright fun vibe, The Nightowls is one of the best bands we have reviewed this year. There is not a weak track on the album.” On May 23, 2018, Entertainment website The Young Folks said of We Are The Nightowls, there's plenty of quality soul to be found, but the band brings Motown into this millennium with renewed, dance-friendly energy and songs like “#selfiequeen".

On November 10, 2017 they released “Lift Me Up” as its first single. The video for "Lift Me Up" premiered in the Austin360 Magazine and has been uploaded to YouTube. In March 2018, The Nightowls performed as a showcase artist at the 2018 SXSW Music Festival in Austin, Texas. On March 27, 2018 The Nightowls released "Don't It Feel Weird (Falling In Love)" as a second single, which had its premier in Glide Magazine. On April 10. 2018 The Nightowls released “#selfiequeen” as a third single. The song premiered in SoulTracks Magazine, where they described it as a “groovy uptempo gem with thrusting brass section, buttery strings and a slice of Incognito soul”. The video for “#selfiequeen” premiered in The Deli Magazine on June 13, 2018. In their review, they said “The video, which was shot live in the studio, is a perfect window into the charismatic live performances that have made the band popular.” The video has also been uploaded to YouTube. On April 17, 2018 The Nightowls released All The Good Things You Are as another single. It premiered in Pop Matters magazine where they described it as “One of those songs you wish would never end, its soulful, dance-oriented groove make it the perfect listening for the wee hours of the morning after the bars close and the party begins to fade”. On July 17, 2018 The Nightowls released "Everybody's Dancing to the Music" as a single. The song, which is not on We Are The Nightowls, features Ivan Neville. On September 1, 2018 they released a video for "Get Funked Up.". The video was shot live in the studio and has been uploaded to YouTube

The Nightowls have been touring throughout the United States in 2018 in support of We Are The Nightowls. In April they toured the West Coast and in May they toured throughout the South and Midwest. In July, they toured the East Coast. In August, they toured the West Coast, including their 1st time in the Pacific Northwest. In September, they toured throughout the South and Midwest.

== Awards and nominations ==
Year	Award	Result
2018	South by Southwest Music Festival Showcase Artist	Performed
2017	Paisley Park Recording Studios "Musicology 2017" Battle of the Bands Competition	Finalist
2016	South by Southwest Music Festival Showcase Artist	Performed
2015	Austin City Limits Music Festival	Performed
2015	South by Southwest Music Festival Showcase Artist	Performed
2015	Black Fret 2015 Grant Nominee	Won
2014	Austin City Limits Music Festival	Performed

== Honors ==
Year	Recognition	Presented by
2015	Runner Up: Best Blues/ Soul/ Funk Band	Austin Music Awards by The Austin Chronicle
2015	One of “10 Bands to Watch”	Austin Monthly annual March music issue
2014	Runner Up: Best New Band	Austin Music Awards by The Austin Chronicle
2014	Runner Up: Best Blues/ Soul/ Funk Band	Austin Music Awards by The Austin Chronicle
2014	Top 10 Album of the Year	Austin Music Awards by The Austin Chronicle
2013	"Nightowls Day" in Austin Texas: November 21	Proclamation by: Mayor Lee Leffingwell

== Members ==
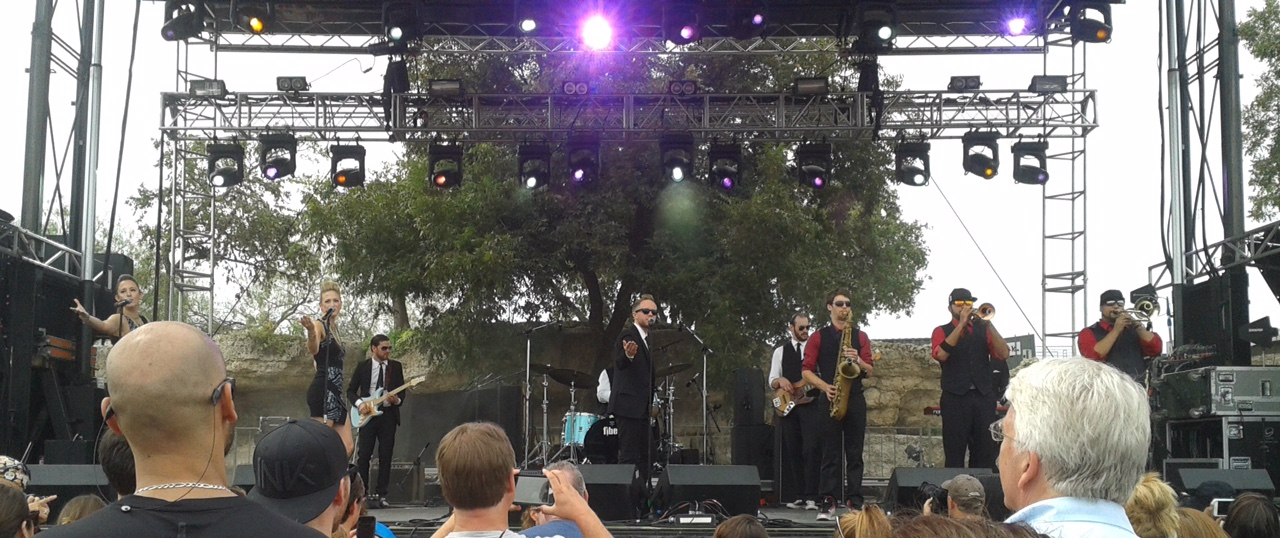
The Nightowls performing at the ACL Music Festival in 2015

- Ryan Harkrider - Vocals
- Kamilla Lamar - Vocals
- Billie Bravo - Vocals
- Rob Alton - Bass
- Andrew McLemore - Saxophone
- Rydog Johnson - Guitar
- Vince Wiley - Keys
- Luke Scallan - Trumpet
- Zol Waterhouse - Trombone
- Justin Hights - Drums

== Discography ==
=== Albums ===
- Good as Gold (2013)
- Good as Gold (vinyl) (2015)
- Fame Sessions (2015)
- We Are the Nightowls (2018)

=== Extended plays ===
- Good as Gold B-sides (2014)
- Royal Sessions (2016)

=== Singles ===
- "Good as Gold" - (January 7, 2014)
- "Get Up!" – (July 20, 2015)
- "Highline" – (August 3, 2015)
- "Nobody But You" – (August 27, 2015)
- "Clean It Up (Play It By the Rules)" – (April 18, 2016)
- "Right Around the Corner" - (May 25, 2016)
- "Can't Bring Me Down" - (June 21, 2016)
- "Lift Me Up" - (November 10, 2017)
- "Don't It Feel Weird (Falling In Love)" - (April 27, 2018)"
- "#selfiequeen" - (April 10, 2018)
- "All the Good Things" - (April 17, 2018)
- "Everybody's Dancing to the Music" - (July 17, 2018)
- "Get Funked Up" - (September 1, 2018)
