= Sepideh (film) =

Sepideh – Reaching for the Stars
- Promotional poster
- Directed by: Berit Madsen
- Written by: Berit Madsen
- Produced by: Henrik Underbjerg; Stefan Frost
- Cinematography: Mohammad Reza; Jahan Panah
- Edited by: Peter Winther
- Production company: Radiator Film ApS
- Distributed by: LevelK
- Release dates: December 20, 2013 (IDFA); January 17, 2014 (Sundance Film Festival)
- Running time: 91 minutes
- Countries: Iran; Denmark; Germany; Norway; Sweden
- Languages: Persian; English

Sepideh – Reaching for the Stars is a 2013 Persian-language Danish documentary film written and directed by Berit Madsen. The film premiered in-competition at the 2013 International Documentary Film Festival Amsterdam on November 24, 2013.

The film later premiered in-competition in the World Cinema Documentary Competition at 2014 Sundance Film Festival on January 17, 2014.

After its premiere at the Sundance Film Festival, the film become available in United States and Canada by iTunes. In 2014 the film won the Maysles Brothers Award at 14th Belfast Film Festival.

== Synopsis ==
Sixteen-year-old Iranian citizen Sepideh wants to become an astronaut. But at her age the nightly stargazing excursions in the desert are a dangerous thorn in the side of family and traditions. She watches a clip of the first female Persian astronaut Anousheh Ansari, and after that she becomes more serious in her efforts. Sepideh writes a letter to Anoosheh and this letter changes her life.

== Reception ==
Sepideh – Reaching for the Stars received mostly positive reviews upon its premiere at the 2014 Sundance Film Festival. Dennis Harvey of Variety, said in his review that "Berit Madsen's documentary offers a leisurely, engaging portrait of a provincial Iranian teenager who dreams of becoming an astronaut." Neil Young in his review for The Hollywood Reporter called the film "Engaging if earthbound documentary is elevated by its subject's feisty pluck." Katie Walsh from Indiewire praised the film by saying that "“Sepideh—Reaching For the Stars,” is an example of why capturing these dreams, and the continued struggles that young women in the world face for simply having dreams, is an important locus for documentary filmmaking."

== Accolades ==
Year	Award	Category	Recipient	Result
2013	International Documentary Film Festival Amsterdam	Award for Best Feature-Length Documentary	Berit Madsen	Nominated
2014	Sundance Film Festival	World Cinema Grand Jury Prize: Documentary	Berit Madsen	Nominated
