= Edet Belzberg =

American filmmaker

- Education: University of Colorado, Boulder; School of International and Public Affairs, Columbia University
- Occupation: filmmaker
- Awards: MacArthur Fellow; John M. Patterson Enterprise Award

Edet Belzberg is a documentary filmmaker. She won a 2005 MacArthur Fellowship.

== Biography ==
Belzberg received a B.A. in 1991 from the University of Colorado, Boulder and an M.A. in 1997 from the School of International and Public Affairs, Columbia University.

She received the Columbia University School of Journalism's John M. Patterson Enterprise Award in 1997 for her documentary short A Master Violinist, about a Chinese political refugee.

With assistance from the Soros Documentary Fund (now the Sundance Documentary Fund), Belzberg made her first feature film Children Underground, a documentary about five homeless street children who lived in a subway system. The film won the Special Jury Prize at the Sundance Film Festival (2001), and received the Best Documentary Film Award from the International Documentary Association (2001). Children Underground was also nominated for a 2001 Academy Award and was one of the first recipients of the IFP Anthony Radziwill Documentary Prize.

In 2005, she received the MacArthur "Genius" award. She lives in New York City, where she has been a frequent guest lecturer on urban reporting and documentary filmmaking at the Columbia School of Journalism, and has also taught at NYU.

Belzberg's 2008 documentary, The Recruiter (originally titled An American Soldier), premiered at the 2008 Sundance Film Festival. It portrays a top U.S. army recruiter and his relationship with four of his recruits as they complete high school and go through basic training.

In 2014 she directed Watchers of the Sky. The film premiered at the 2014 Sundance Film Festival on January 20, 2014 in the U.S. Documentary Competition. It won the U.S. Documentary Editing Award and the U.S. Documentary Special Jury Award for Achievement for Use of Animation. It went on to win the Jonathan Daniels Award at the Monadnock International Film Festival, and the Ostrovsky Award for Best Documentary Film at the Jerusalem Film Festival.

After its premiere at the Sundance Film Festival, Music Box Films acquired the US distribution rights.

== Director filmography ==
- A Master Violinist (1997, short)
- Children Underground (2001)
- Gymnast (2005)
- Time Piece (2006) (Bobby's Tale segment)
- The Recruiter (2008)
- Watchers of the Sky (2014)

== Producer filmography ==
- Anthem (1997) (associate producer)
- Children Underground (2001)
- Gymnast (2005)
- The Recruiter (2007)
