= Watchers of the Sky =

- Promotional poster
- Directed by: Edet Belzberg
- Produced by: Edet Belzberg; Amelia Green-Dove; Kerry Propper; Taylor Krauss
- Cinematography: Mai Iskander; Jerry Risius; Nelson Walker III; Sam Cullman; Edet Belzberg; Taylor Krauss
- Edited by: Jenny Golden; Karen Sim
- Music by: Dougie Bowne
- Production companies: Propeller Films; The Unofficial Man
- Distributed by: Music Box Films
- Release dates: January 20, 2014 (Sundance); October 10, 2014 (United States)
- Running time: 120 minutes
- Country: United States
- Language: English

Watchers of the Sky is a 2014 American documentary film about genocide, directed by Edet Belzberg. The film premiered at the 2014 Sundance Film Festival on January 20, 2014 in the U.S. Documentary Competition. It won the two awards at the festival. It went on to win the Jonathan Daniels Award at the Monadnock International Film Festival and the Ostrovsky Award for Best Documentary Film at the Jerusalem Film Festival.

After its premiere at the Sundance Film Festival, Music Box Films acquired the US distribution rights. The film was released in October 2014. Films We Like released it in Canada and Madman Entertainment released it in New Zealand and Australia.

== Synopsis ==
The film depicts the journey of lawyer Raphael Lemkin and his efforts in lobbying the United Nations to establish the Genocide Convention. The movie also focuses on four people inspired by Lemkin: Samantha Power, United States Ambassador to the United Nations; Benjamin B. Ferencz, Chief Prosecutor in the Einsatzgruppen trial at Nuremberg; Luis Moreno Ocampo, first Prosecutor of the International Criminal Court; and Emmanuel Uwurukundo, head of operations for refugee camps in Chad set up by the United Nations High Commissioner for Refugees in the War in Darfur. The film is based on Power's Pulitzer Prize-winning book, A Problem from Hell.

The film discusses several instances of genocide throughout history, including the Armenian genocide, the Rwandan genocide, the War in Darfur, and the Holocaust, among others. It features an extensive interview with former journalist and United States Ambassador to the United Nations Samantha Power, as well as discussions with former ICC prosecutor Luis Moreno Ocampo.

== Reception ==
The film received positive response from critics. Dennis Harvey, in his review for Variety, wrote that "Edet Belzberg's sweeping survey of global genocide is an impressive and artful cinematic thesis of palpable substance." Duane Byrge of The Hollywood Reporter gave the film positive review and said that "An exhaustive, complex look at genocide with a sobering and historically predictable prognosis." Steve Greene from Indiewire, in his review, wrote that "As a documentary, "Watchers of the Sky” shows how even capturing that progress is a monumental task in itself." Amber Wilkinson, in her review for Eye for Film, gave the film four stars out of four and said that "There is quite a lot of onscreen reading to be done as well as watching, but the passages of Lemkin that Belzberg chooses are always well-illustrated either by the animation or archival footage." Entertainment Weekly called it "fiery" and "essential" and Joshua Brunsting of Criterioncast.com named it one of 2014's best and said it was "a tour-de-force." The film did also receive the Cinema for Peace Award for Justice in 2016.

== Accolades ==
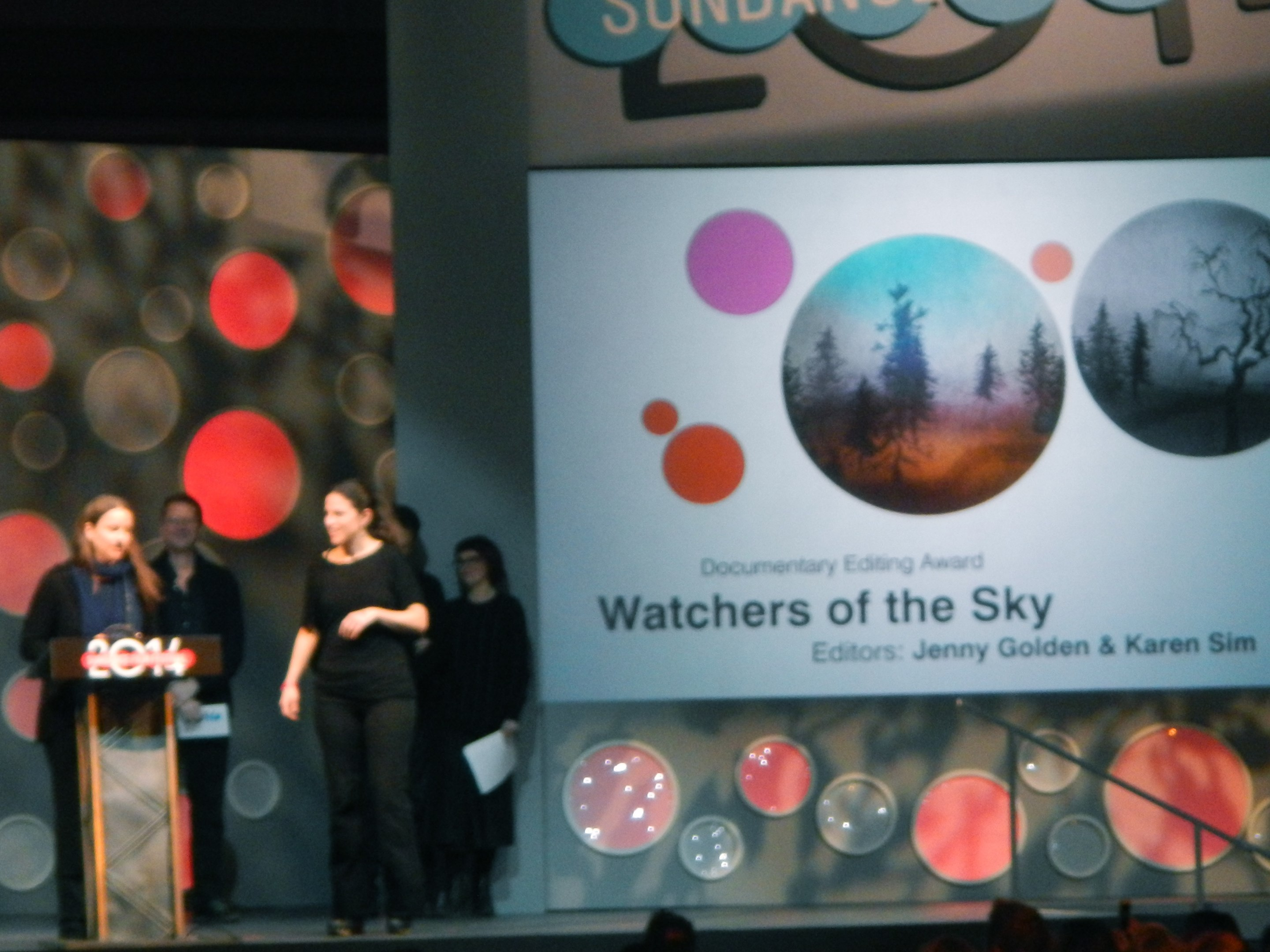
Watchers of the Sky, won the Editing Award: U.S. Documentary and

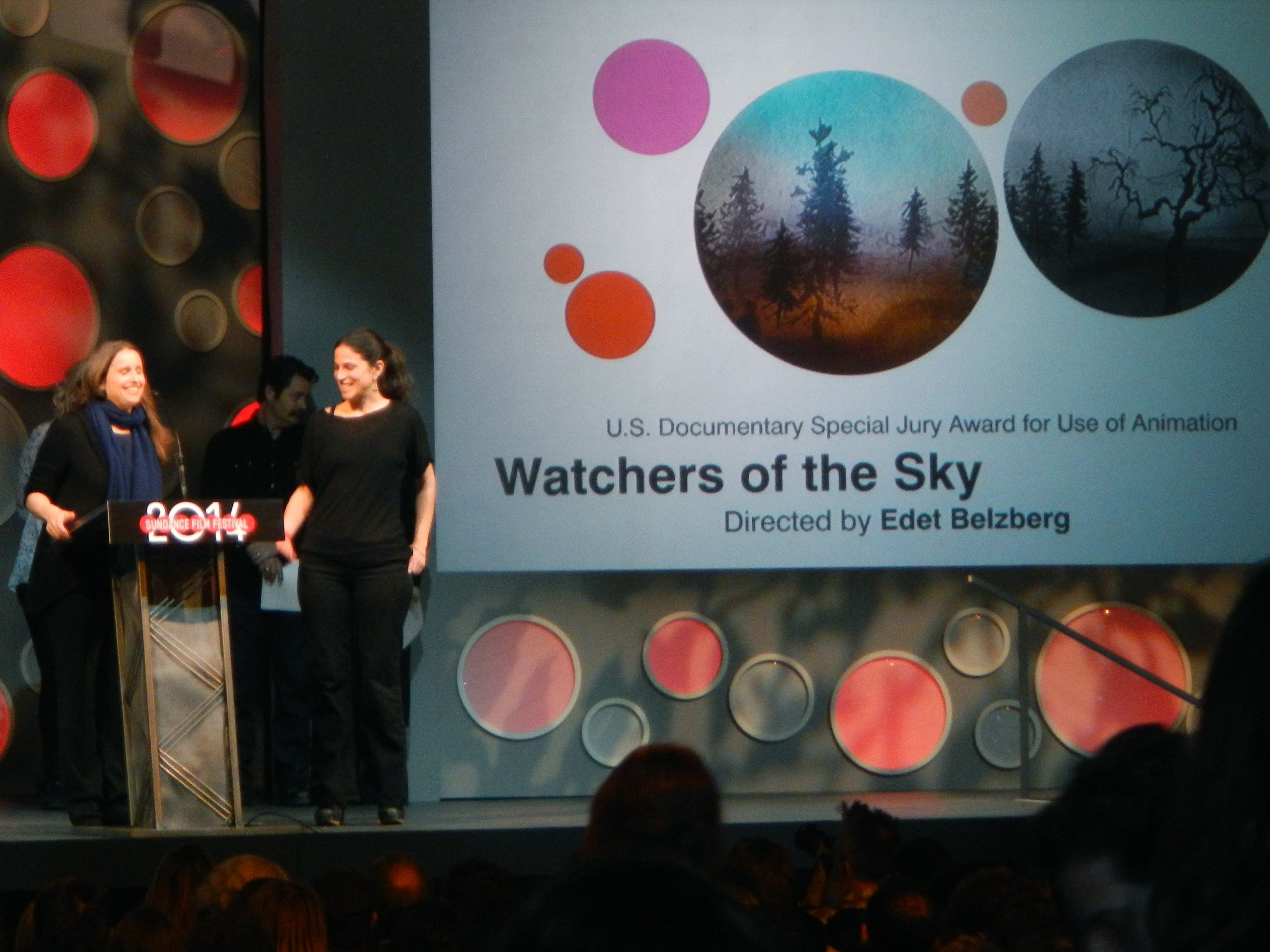
U.S. Documentary Special Jury Award for Achievement for Use of Animation at 2014 Sundance Film Festival

Year	Award	Category	Recipient	Result
2014	Sundance Film Festival	U.S. Grand Jury Prize: Documentary	Edet Belzberg	Nominated
2014	Sundance Film Festival	Editing Award: U.S. Documentary	Jenny Golden and Karen Sim	Won
2014	Sundance Film Festival	U.S. Documentary Special Jury Award for Achievement for Use of Animation	Edet Belzberg	Won
