= The Disobedient =

- Sundance film poster
- Directed by: Mina Djukic
- Written by: Mina Djukic
- Produced by: Mina Djukic; Nikola Ležaić; Maximilian Leo; Jonas Katzenstein
- Starring: Hana Selimović; Mladen Sovilj; Minja Subota; Danijel Šike; Ivan Đorđević; Dunja Tatić; Žarko Radić
- Cinematography: Dorde Arambasic
- Edited by: Ivan Vasić; Dragan von Petrovic
- Production companies: Augenschein Filmproduktion; Film House Kiselo Dete
- Distributed by: Sundance Channel
- Release date: January 20, 2014 (Sundance Film Festival)
- Running time: 112 minutes
- Country: Serbia
- Language: Serbian

The Disobedient (Serbian: Neposlušni, Непослушни) is a 2014 Serbian drama film written, directed and produced by Mina Djukic. The film premiered in-competition in the World Cinema Dramatic Competition at 2014 Sundance Film Festival on January 20, 2014.

The film later premiered at the 2014 International Film Festival Rotterdam on January 29, 2014. The film also screened at 13th !f Istanbul AFM International Independent Film Festival on February 13, 2014.

After its premiere at the Sundance Film Festival, Sundance Channel acquired the rights of the film for all territories where the channel is seen. It was one of six films shortlisted by Serbia to be their submission for the Academy Award for Best Foreign Language Film at the 88th Academy Awards, but it lost out to Enclave.

== Plot ==
Childhood best friends, Leni and Lazar reconnect when Lazar returns from his extensive travels abroad for his father's funeral. They embark on a bicycle trip together, during this trip Leni must decide that is there strong enough connection between them to build a life together.

== Cast ==
- Hana Selimović as Leni
- Mladen Sovilj as Lazar
- Minja Subota as Narrator
- Danijel Šike as Cora
- Ivan Đorđević as Jovan
- Aleksandra Pleskonjic as Slavica
- Raslav Sekulović as mali Lazar
- Marko Janjić as Miljan
- Branka Šelić as Ana
- Žarko Radić as Aleks
- Dunja Tatić

== Reception ==
The Disobedient received mixed reviews upon its premiere at the 2014 Sundance Film Festival. Dennis Harvey of Variety, said in his review that "There’s nothing wrong with “The Disobedient” that an actual script couldn’t have helped, at the very least. In all other departments, it’s quite smartly turned, the dominating contribution (and pleasure) being Djorde Arambasic’s often lovely, mostly outdoor photography. Screener viewed lacked closing credits." Stephen Farber in his review for The Hollywood Reporter called the film "Painfully slow Serbian road movie offers few rewards for American viewers."

However, Mark Adams from Screen International praised the film by saying that "A lush and lyrical tale, rich in its presentation of tantalising pastoral romance set against a beautiful sunbaked landscape." Ben Umstead of Twitch Film also gave the film a positive review and said that "it is the celebration of youth, and the understanding that we should cherish it while we can, for it won't always be the same."

== Accolades ==
| Year | Award | Category | Recipient | Result |
|---|---|---|---|---|
| 2014 | Sundance Film Festival | World Cinema Grand Jury Prize: Dramatic | Mina Djukic | Nominated |
