= Memphis (2013 film) =

- Film poster
- Directed by: Tim Sutton
- Screenplay by: Tim Sutton
- Produced by: John Baker
- Starring: Willis Earl Beal; Constance Brantley; Larry Dodson; Lainie Kazan; Curtis Armstrong
- Cinematography: Chris Dapkins
- Edited by: Seth Bomse
- Music by: Willis Earl Beal
- Production companies: Alcon Entertainment; Belle Pictures; The Mark Gordon Company
- Distributed by: Kino Lorber; Sony Pictures Classic
- Release date: August 21, 2013 (Venice)
- Running time: 79 minutes
- Country: United States
- Language: English

Memphis is a 2013 musical drama film, directed by Tim Sutton. The film stars Willis Earl Beal in the lead role of talented singer.

The film had its premiere at the 70th Venice International Film Festival on August 31, 2013. The film was also awarded the cinema funding grant by Venice Biennale College.

The film later screened at 2014 Sundance Film Festival on January 17, 2014. Vimeo acquired the exclusive 30-day worldwide digital window on the film, while Kino Lorber will theatrically release the film.

== Plot ==
A singer drifts through Memphis city on a journey of self-discovery.

== Cast ==
- Willis Earl Beal
- Wole Parks as Michael Jordan
- Todd Williams as Chad
- Constance Brantley
- Larry Dodson
- Devonte Hull
- Lopaka Thomas
- John Gary Williams
- Lainie Kazan as Mary
- Curtis Armstrong as Jake

== Reception ==
Memphis received mostly positive reviews from critics. Justin Lowe in his review for The Hollywood Reporter called it "A film of quiet intensity and poetic imagery." Rob Nelson of Variety, praised the film by saying that "(it) is a digressive, daringly experimental study of a flailing musician, magnetically played by accomplished bluesman and poet Willis Earl Beal."

== See also ==
- List of black films of the 2010s
