= All the Beautiful Things =

- Sundance poster
- Directed by: John D. Harkrider
- Written by: John D. Harkrider
- Produced by: Justin Lundstrom
- Cinematography: Brian O'Carroll
- Edited by: Jim Mol
- Music by: Jeremy Pelt
- Production company: Riff Raff Films
- Release date: January 20, 2014 (Sundance)
- Running time: 137 minutes (2 hours and 17 minutes)
- Country: United States
- Language: English

All the Beautiful Things is a 2014 American documentary film written and directed by John D. Harkrider. The film premiered in competition category of U.S. Documentary Competition program at the 2014 Sundance Film Festival on January 20, 2014.

== Premise ==
The film deals with relationship between two friends John and Barron. Barron was falsely accused of rape and with John's betrayal, face life in jail. Years later they met again to repair their damaged friendship.

== Reception ==
The film received mixed reviews from critics. John DeFore in his review for The Hollywood Reporter said that "A pretty but enormously self-indulgent project that wants us to play therapist." Sean P. Means of The Salt Lake Tribune gave the film a negative review by saying that "This material might have worked as a stage play, but as a contrived "documentary" it feels phony and self-absorbed."
