= Jash =

Comedy community; YouTube channel

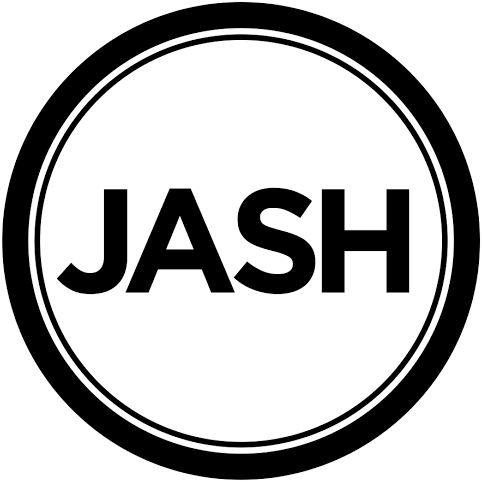
- Created by: Michael Cera; Tim Heidecker; Eric Wareheim; Sarah Silverman; Reggie Watts
- Original language: English

Production
- Producers: Daniel Kellison; Doug DeLuca; Mickey Meyer
- Production company: Fullscreen Inc.

Original release
- Release: March 10, 2013

Jash (stylized as JASH) is a comedy community and advertising agency created by Michael Cera, Tim Heidecker, Eric Wareheim, Sarah Silverman and Reggie Watts. New videos are posted to the Jash homepage periodically by the creative team, and by new members of the always expanding collective of comics. Jash premiered online March 10, 2013. Since its launch, Jash has gone on to extend its reach into traditional media with television, series and award-winning short films.

"JASH" was picked as the name of the channel instead of "JOSH" because the domain had already been taken. Later on, the backronym "Just Attitude So Hey" was created to fit the "JASH" name.

== History ==
=== Formation ===
Jash was formed under the YouTube Original Channel Initiative in October 2012.

=== Launch ===
The channel was launched on March 10, 2013, concurrent with a kickoff panel by the creative team during South by Southwest (SXSW), broadcast live on the podcast Comedy Bang! Bang!

=== Acquisition by Group Nine Media ===
On November 7, 2017, JASH was acquired by Group Nine Media, which Discovery Communications (later Discovery Inc.) held a 35% stake in. Group Nine has since been folded into Vox Media.
