= 2014 Sundance Film Festival =

2014 film award ceremony

- Festival poster
- Opening film: Whiplash
- Closing film: Rudderless
- Location: Park City, Salt Lake City, Ogden, and Sundance, Utah
- Hosted by: Sundance Institute
- Festival date: January 16–26, 2014
- Language: English
- Website: sundance.org/festival
- 2015 Sundance Film Festival 2013 Sundance Film Festival

The 2014 Sundance Film Festival took place from January 16, 2014 until January 26, 2014 in Park City, Utah, United States, with screenings in Salt Lake City, Ogden, and Sundance Resort in Utah. The festival opened with Whiplash directed by Damien Chazelle and closed with musical drama Rudderless directed by William H. Macy.

The festival honored late Roger Ebert and premiered Life Itself by Steve James, a biographical documentary film based on Ebert's 2011 memoir titled as Life Itself: A Memoir on 19 January 2014. The festival introduced a new film category titled Sundance Kids, which will help to introduce independent films to a younger generation of audiences. It is also a first category at the festival dedicated to children's films. The festival also hosted several events and discussion panels around themes of success through failure titled Free Fail, which included the screening of Bottle Rocket turned down by the Sundance Film Festival in 1996 and later become independently successful. The festival had more than 700 sponsors and 1,830 volunteers.

== About the festival ==
A record 12,218 films were submitted, 72 more films than the 2013 festival. Of the 4,057-plus feature films were submitted, 2,014 were from the U.S. and 2,043 were international, and 121 were selected from 37 countries (with 100 of them being world premieres). Of the 8,161 short films submitted, 66 were selected (59 more than for the 2013 Festival). There were 54 directors, who made their directorial debut at the festival, 35 of whom have films in competition. Sixteen films were selected each for the U.S. Dramatic and U.S. Documentary competition sections, and twelve films each for the World Cinema Dramatic and World Cinema Documentary sections.

This year's festival marked the 30th anniversary of the festival since its foundation in 1981 by Robert Redford. In celebration of 30th anniversary of the festival, the screening of the most groundbreaking films of the past three decades took place at the festival. Some of the films which were shown are Beasts of the Southern Wild, Fruitvale Station, Little Miss Sunshine, An Education, Sex, Lies, and Videotape, Reservoir Dogs, The Cove, Hedwig and the Angry Inch, An Inconvenient Truth, Precious and Napoleon Dynamite. An Artist at the Table event was also hosted at the 30th anniversary of the festival, which was attended by Festival board members, patrons and artists visiting the festival including Mark Ruffalo, Katie Couric and Doug Aitken.

Music was major part of the festival. Most of the movies in the festival had musical themes. The opening night film Whiplash used music to explore human nature and identity. God Help the Girl, a coming of age drama with musical theme directed by Stuart Murdoch. Memphis starring musician Willis Earl Beal as an artist. Australian musician Flea appears in Low Down, a biopic about American jazz pianist Joe Albany. Only Lovers Left Alive follows a musician and his lover while his world is collapsing down. Alive Inside: A Story of Music and Memory, a documentary about a man who wanted to help the Alzheimer's patient with music. Frank, comedy about a young musician, starring Michael Fassbender. 20,000 Days on Earth, a documentary narrating a day in the life of Nick Cave including cameos by Kylie Minogue and Ray Winstone. Also the closing night film of the festival Rudderless, told the story of a father who formed a rock and roll band to perform his late son's music.

== Awards ==
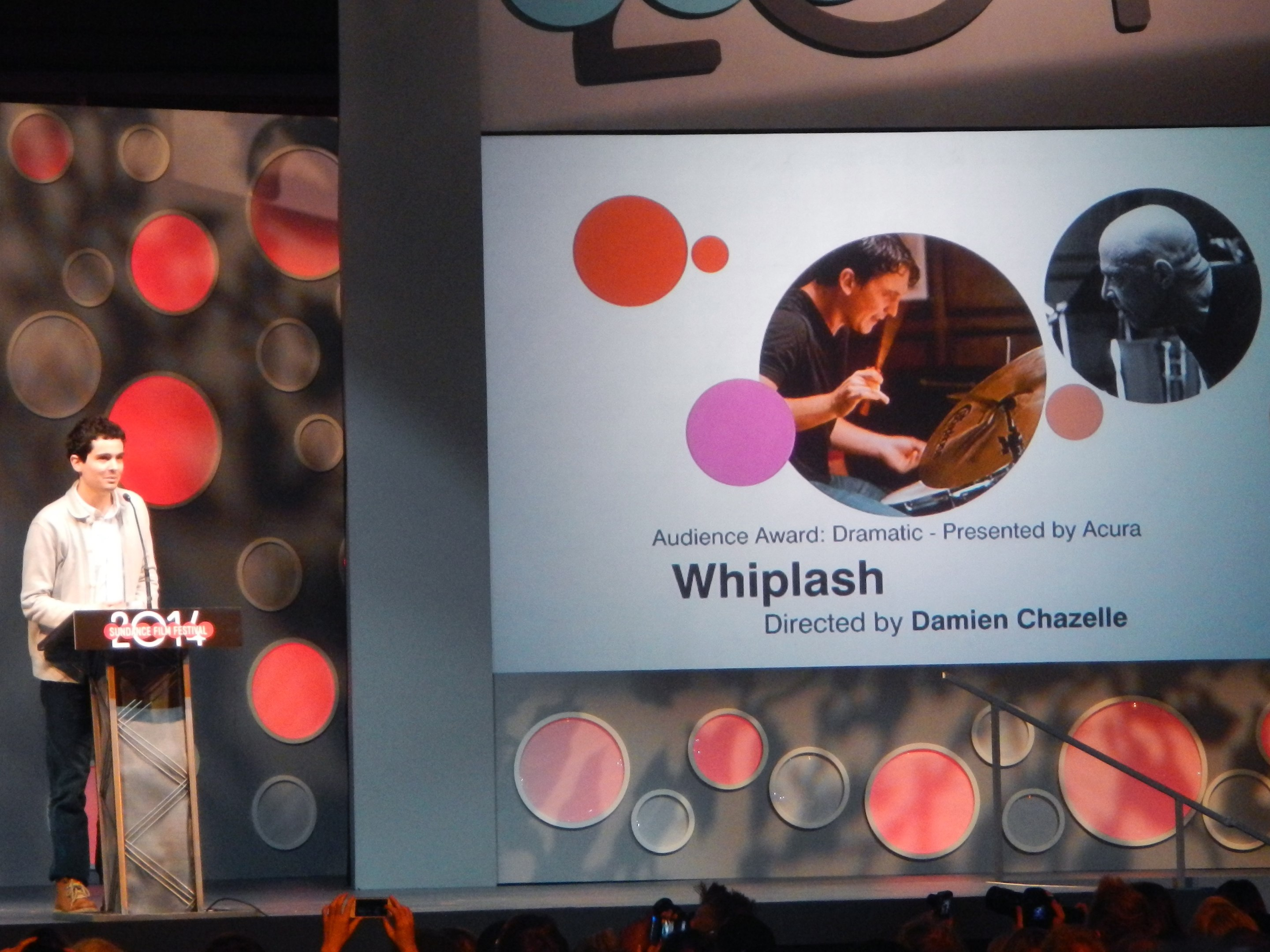
Whiplash won the U.S. Grand Jury Prize: Dramatic and Audience Award: U.S. Dramatic at the festival.

The awards ceremony was held on January 26, 2014 at the Basin Recreation Fieldhouse in Park City, Utah, and was hosted by Nick Offerman and Megan Mullally.

- U.S. Grand Jury Prize: Documentary - Rich Hill
- U.S. Grand Jury Prize: Dramatic - Whiplash
- World Cinema Grand Jury Prize: Documentary - The Return to Homs
- World Cinema Grand Jury Prize: Dramatic - To Kill a Man
- Audience Award: U.S. Documentary - Alive Inside: A Story of Music and Memory
- Audience Award: U.S. Dramatic - Whiplash
- Audience Award: World Cinema Documentary - The Green Prince
- Audience Award: World Cinema Dramatic - Difret
- Audience Award: Best of NEXT - Imperial Dreams
- Directing Award: U.S. Documentary - The Case Against 8
- Directing Award: U.S. Dramatic - Fishing Without Nets
- Directing Award: World Cinema Documentary - 20,000 Days on Earth
- Directing Award: World Cinema Dramatic - 52 Tuesdays
- Waldo Salt Screenwriting Award: U.S. Dramatic - The Skeleton Twins
- Screenwriting Award: World Cinema Dramatic - Blind
- Editing Award: U.S. Documentary - Watchers of the Sky
- Editing Award: World Cinema Documentary - 20,000 Days on Earth
- Cinematography Award: U.S. Documentary - E-Team
- Cinematography Award: U.S. Dramatic - Low Down
- Cinematography Award: World Cinema Documentary - Happiness
- Cinematography Award: World Cinema Dramatic - Lilting
- U.S. Documentary Special Jury Award for Achievement for Use of Animation - Watchers of the Sky
- U.S. Documentary Special Jury Award for Achievement for Intuitive Filmmaking - The Overnighters
- U.S. Dramatic Special Jury Award for Musical Score - The Octopus Project for Kumiko, the Treasure Hunter
- U.S. Dramatic Special Jury Award for Breakthrough Talent - Justin Simien for Dear White People
- World Cinema Dramatic Special Jury Award - God Help the Girl
- World Cinema Documentary Special Jury Award for Cinematic Bravery - We Come as Friends
- Short Film Audience Award - Chapel Perilous
- Alfred P. Sloan Feature Film Prize - I Origins

Additional awards were presented at separate ceremonies. The Shorts Awards were presented January 21, 2014 at the ceremony in Park City, Utah.

- Short Film Grand Jury Prize - Of God and Dogs
- Short Film Jury Award: U.S. Fiction - Gregory Go Boom
- Short Film Jury Award: International Fiction - The Cut, Geneviève Dulude-De Celles
- Short Film Jury Award: Non-fiction - I Think This Is the Closest to How the Footage Looked
- Short Film Jury Award: Animation - Yearbook
- Short Film Special Jury Award for Unique Vision - Rat Pack Rat
- Short Film Special Jury Award for Direction and Ensemble Acting - Burger
- Short Film Special Special Jury Award for Non-fiction - Love. Love. Love.
- Sundance Institute/Mahindra Global Filmmaking Awards - Hong Khaou for Monsoon, Tobias Lindholm for A War, Ashlee Page for Archive and Neeraj Ghaywan for Fly Away Solo.
- Sundance Institute/NHK Filmmaker Award - Mark Elijah Rosenberg for Ad Inexplorata
- Hilton Worldwide LightStay Sustainability Award - Ben Kalina for Shored Up (and $25,000 grant)
- 2014 Red Crown Producer's Award - Elisabeth Holm for Obvious Child (and $10,000 grant)

== Juries ==
Jury members, for the U.S. Documentary Jury, were announced on December 18, 2013. The rest of the jury members including the Alfred P. Sloan Jury, which will also take part in the Science in Film Forum Panel, were announced on January 9, 2014. Presenters of awards are followed by asterisks:

U.S. Documentary Jury

- Tracy Chapman*
- Charlotte Cook*
- Kahane Cooperman*
- Morgan Neville*
- Jonathan Oppenheim*

U.S. Dramatic Jury

- Leonard Maltin*
- Peter Saraf*
- Lone Scherfig*
- Bryan Singer
- Dana Stevens*

World Documentary Jury

- Andrea Nix Fine*
- Sally Riley*
- Caspar Sonnen*

World Dramatic Jury

- Carlo Chatrian*
- Sebastián Lelio*
- Nansun Shi*

Alfred P. Sloan Jury

- Dr. Kevin Hand
- Flora Lichtman
- Max Mayer
- Jon Spaihts
- Jill Tarter

Short Film Jury

- Vernon Chatman*
- Joshua Leonard*
- Ania Trzebiatowska*

Others who presented awards included Felicity Huffman, William H. Macy and Nick Offerman.

== Films ==
For a full list of films appeared at the festival, see List of films at the 2014 Sundance Film Festival.

== Festival theaters ==
The number of seats available at the festival theaters, where films were shown is listed below:

Park City

- Eccles Theatre - 1,270 seats
- Egyptian Theatre - 282 seats
- Holiday Village Cinema 1 - 162 seats
- Holiday Village Cinema 2 - 154 seats
- Holiday Village Cinema 2 - 154 seats
- Holiday Village Cinema 4 - 162 seats
- Library Center Theatre - 486 seats
- The MARC Theatre - 550 seats
- Prospector Square Theatre - 324 seats
- Redstone Cinema 1 - 188 seats
- Redstone Cinema 2 - 175 seats
- Redstone Cinema 7 - 176 seats
- Temple Theatre - 318 seats
- Yarrow Hotel Theatre - 295 seats

Salt Lake City

- Broadway Cinema 3 - 243 seats
- Broadway Cinema 6 - 245 seats
- Rose Wagner Performing Arts Center - 495 seats
- SLC Library - 300 seats
- Tower Theatre - 349 seats

Sundance Resort

- Sundance Resort Screening Room - 164 seats

Ogden

- Peery's Egyptian Theatre - 840 seats

=== Sundance Film Festival U.S.A. ===
In late January, 2014 the festival sent 9 filmmakers to 9 cities across the US to screen and discuss their films. The cities and films are:

- Ann Arbor, Michigan at Michigan Theater - Infinitely Polar Bear
- Boston, Massachusetts at Coolidge Corner Theatre - WHITEY: United States of America v. James J. Bulger
- Chicago, Illinois at Music Box Theatre - Happy Christmas
- Houston, Texas at Sundance Cinemas Houston - Cold in July
- Nashville, Tennessee at The Belcourt Theatre - Low Down
- Orlando, Florida at Enzian Theater - Little Accidents
- San Francisco, California at Sundance Kabuki Cinemas - Camp X-Ray
- Seattle, Washington at Sundance Cinemas Seattle - The Skeleton Twins
- Tucson, Arizona at The Loft - Young Ones

== Acquisitions ==
Acquisitions at the festival included the following:

Domestic Rights

- CNN Films and Lionsgate
  - Dinosaur 13
- Focus Features
  - Wish I Was Here
- Pivot and Univision News
  - Cesar's Last Fast
- A24
  - Laggies
  - Obvious Child
- Lionsgate
  - Cooties
- Lionsgate and Roadside Attractions
  - The Skeleton Twins
- IFC Films
  - God's Pocket
  - Cold in July
- Fox Searchlight Pictures
  - Calvary
- Sony Pictures Classics
  - Love Is Strange
  - Whiplash
- iTunes
  - Sepideh – Reaching for the Stars
- Netflix
  - Mitt
- RADiUS-TWC
  - Fed Up
- Samuel Goldwyn Films
  - Ivory Tower
- Drafthouse Films
  - The Overnighters
- The Orchard and Independent Lens
  - Rich Hill
- Music Box Films
  - Watchers of the Sky
- Participant Media and FilmBuff
  - The Internet's Own Boy: The Story of Aaron Swartz
- Drafthouse
  - 20,000 Days on Earth

International Rights

- Sony Pictures Worldwide
  - Whiplash
- Magnolia Pictures and Paramount Pictures
  - Happy Christmas
- Fox Searchlight Pictures
  - I Origins
- Sony Pictures Worldwide
  - The Skeleton Twins
- Sony Pictures Classics
  - Land Ho!
- RADiUS-TWC
  - The One I Love
- Sony Pictures Classics and Pretty Pictures
  - Love Is Strange
- Paramount Pictures
  - Ivory Tower
