= For Film's Sake =

Film festival

For Film's Sake (FFS), formerly World of Women’s Cinema (WOW) Film Festival and known as the WOW Film Festival, is a film festival showcasing films made by women that ran in Sydney, New South Wales, Australia. It has been on hiatus since the 23rd edition in 2019.

== History ==
The WOW Film Festival was organised by Women in Film and Television (WIFT) NSW, from around 1996. Georgia Wallace-Crabbe was director of the festival in the 1990s. Initially restricted to short film, the festival's aims were to promote and recognise through awards "the talents of women directors, producers, writers, editors and cinematographers in the Australian film industry and internationally". In 2013, Tamara Popper was director of the 19th edition of the festival, and it took place to coincide with International Women's Day, in locations including Dendy Cinemas and AFTRS. The festival's patron in 2014 was Rachel Griffiths.

In 2016, the 21st edition of the festival was advertised as "screening in Sydney Australia, travelling to national and overseas locations". It was scheduled to run in Sydney from 28 April to 1 May 2016, and then tour Australia from May 2016 to May 2017, and included premieres of four international feature films.

However the 2016 festival was mounted under its new name For Film's Sake (FFS), with Gillian Armstrong as patron and with a digital remastered version of her acclaimed 1979 film My Brilliant Career screening on the opening night. The entries included both short and feature films. The film charity For Film's Sake was founded by media commentator Sophie Mathisen.

In 2017 FFS was accredited by AACTA, and was supported by Screen Australia, Create NSW and the City of Sydney. From 2016 to 2018 FFS was the only AACTA-accredited female film festival in Australia.

The 23rd edition, as FFS, was hosted by Event Cinemas and presented in partnership with University of Technology Sydney and Create NSW. Its feature film award and bursary, named in honour of Australian e director Samantha Rebillet, was awarded to Jessica M. Thompson for her debut feature, The Light of the Moon.

The festival was paused after the 2019 event after a strategic review, intending to be revived at a future date.

== Awards ==
WOW Film Festival awards included awards for best film in several categories; best director; best writer; best cinematographer; best editor; and best music composition for eligible films.
