= Colin and Cameron Cairnes =

Australian filmmakers

- Born: Colin Cairnes; United Kingdom Cameron Cairnes; Melbourne, Victoria, Australia
- Occupations: Filmmaker; actor; editor
- Years active: 1995–present
- Notable work: 100 Bloody Acres; Scare Campaign; Late Night with the Devil

Colin Cairnes and Cameron Cairnes are an Australian sibling filmmaking duo. They are best known for writing and directing the horror films 100 Bloody Acres (2012), Scare Campaign (2016) and Late Night with the Devil (2023).

== Lives and careers ==
Colin was born in the United Kingdom and Cameron was born in Melbourne, Victoria, Australia, but both grew up in Brisbane, Australia. They both started their careers directing short films and television.

In 2012, they made their directorial debut with the horror comedy film 100 Bloody Acres, starring Damon Herriman, Angus Sampson and Anna McGahan.

In 2016, they wrote and directed the horror film Scare Campaign, starring Meegan Warner, Ian Meadows, Olivia DeJonge and Josh Quong Tart.

In 2023, they wrote, directed and edited the horror film Late Night with the Devil, starring David Dastmalchian, Laura Gordon, Ian Bliss, Fayssal Bazzi and Ingrid Torelli.

== Filmography ==
=== Films ===
Year	Title	Director	Writer	Editor	Notes
2012	100 Bloody Acres	Yes	Yes	No	Directorial debut
2016	Scare Campaign	Yes	Yes	No	
2023	Late Night with the Devil	Yes	Yes	Yes	
