= Late Night with the Devil =

2023 film by Colin and Cameron Cairnes

- Theatrical release poster
- Directed by: Colin Cairnes; Cameron Cairnes
- Written by: Colin Cairnes; Cameron Cairnes
- Produced by: Mat Govoni; Adam White; John Molloy; Roy Lee; Steven Schneider; Derek Dauchy
- Starring: David Dastmalchian; Laura Gordon; Ian Bliss; Fayssal Bazzi; Ingrid Torelli; Rhys Auteri; Georgina Haig; Josh Quong Tart
- Cinematography: Matthew Temple
- Edited by: Colin Cairnes; Cameron Cairnes
- Music by: Glenn Richards; Roscoe James Irwin
- Production companies: Image Nation Abu Dhabi; VicScreen; AGC Studios; Cinetic Media; Good Fiend Films; Future Pictures; Spooky Pictures
- Distributed by: IFC Films; Shudder; Umbrella Entertainment; Maslow Entertainment; Ahi Films
- Release dates: 10 March 2023 (SXSW); 22 March 2024 (United States); 11 April 2024 (Australia)
- Running time: 93 minutes
- Countries: Australia; United States; United Arab Emirates
- Language: English
- Box office: $16.7 million

Late Night with the Devil is a 2023 independent postmodernist supernatural horror film written, directed, and edited by brothers Colin and Cameron Cairnes. It stars David Dastmalchian, Laura Gordon, Ian Bliss, Fayssal Bazzi, Ingrid Torelli, Rhys Auteri, Georgina Haig, and Josh Quong Tart. Incorporating elements of analog horror, found footage, and documentary filmmaking, the film follows the events of a late-night talk show episode aired on the night of Halloween 1977, during which the host attempts to boost ratings by inviting an allegedly possessed girl onto the show.

An international co-production of Australia, the United States, and the United Arab Emirates, Late Night with the Devil had its world premiere at the South by Southwest Film Festival (SXSW) on 10 March 2023. It was released theatrically in the United States on 22 March 2024 by IFC Films and in Australia on 11 April. The film grossed $16 million and was generally well-received.

== Plot ==
The film's prologue is framed as a documentary investigating an unexplained event that occurred on the night of Halloween 1977, during the live broadcast of a sixth-season episode of the struggling variety late-night talk show Night Owls with Jack Delroy, which competes for ratings with The Tonight Show Starring Johnny Carson.

Night Owls host Jack Delroy, based in New York City, regularly visits "The Grove," an elite California camp for wealthy and powerful men. After his wife Madeleine dies of cancer, production of Night Owls is suspended. Jack eventually returns and, seeking to revive the show's ratings, hosts an occult-themed Halloween episode featuring self-proclaimed psychic and medium Christou, skeptic and former magician Carmichael Haig, parapsychologist Dr. June Ross-Mitchell, and June's latest subject, 13-year-old Lilly, who is purportedly possessed by a demonic spirit. Carmichael offers a large check to anyone who can prove that supernatural phenomena exist.

During the broadcast, Christou suffers a severe headache and has a premonition involving someone named "Minnie." Carmichael dismisses the episode as a performance until Jack reveals that "Minnie" was his private nickname for Madeleine. Christou becomes violently ill, vomits a black liquid, and is taken to the hospital. June then introduces Lilly, the sole survivor of a police raid that resulted in a mass suicide by a Satanic church led by Szandor D'Abo, who worshipped Abraxas. Jack persuades Lilly to communicate with the entity possessing her, whom she calls "Mr. Wriggles." During a commercial break, Jack's producer Leo tells him that Christou has died of a brain hemorrhage in the ambulance.

During June's conjuring, Lilly becomes possessed and levitates in her chair. The demon claims to have previously met Jack "under the tall trees" and reveals that Jack and June are romantically involved. Lilly soon returns to normal, allowing the broadcast to continue.

Carmichael challenges June by hypnotizing Jack's sidekick Gus McConnell. Nearly everyone in the studio sees worms pouring from Gus until Carmichael ends the demonstration with the phrase "Dreamer, Here, Awake". A review of the footage shows that the worms were a shared hallucination, but the supernatural events during June's conjuring remain visible in the recording. Jack is horrified to see Madeleine's ghost behind him, while Carmichael accuses him of staging the events. Lilly becomes possessed again, her head splitting open and glowing like lava, then brutally kills Gus and June. Convinced that the supernatural is real, Carmichael begs for his life and offers Lilly the promised check, but she burns him alive.

Breaking the found footage format, Jack is transported into a nightmarish version of the show, where he relives its past before discovering his connection to the demon possessing Lilly. At a ceremony at The Grove, he made a pact with the Devil, unintentionally sacrificing Madeleine's soul in exchange for fame and the success of Night Owls. This pact indirectly caused her cancer. Madeleine's ghost begs Jack to end her suffering. Using the ritual Athame dagger from Lilly's former Satanic cult, Jack stabs her to death, only for the scene to shift to the empty studio, where he realizes he has killed Lilly on live television. Standing over the bodies of his dead guests, Jack repeats "Dreamer, Here, Awake" as police sirens approach. The screen's "End of Transmission" message changes to "So It Is Done."

== Cast ==
- David Dastmalchian as Jack Delroy, the host of Night Owls with Jack Delroy
- Laura Gordon as Dr. June Ross-Mitchell, a parapsychologist and author who cares for, treats, and writes about Lilly
- Ian Bliss as Carmichael Haig, a former magician turned skeptic. The character resembles the magician-turned-skeptic James Randi; Randi was involved in a similar altercation with Australian late night host Don Lane on The Don Lane Show.
- Fayssal Bazzi as Christou, a psychic
- Ingrid Torelli as Lilly, the survivor of a cult, who is possessed by a minor demon she calls Mr. Wriggles
- Rhys Auteri as Gus McConnell, Jack's sidekick
- Georgina Haig as Madeleine Piper, Jack's deceased wife
- Josh Quong Tart as Leo Fiske, the producer of Night Owls
- Steve Mouzakis as Szandor D'Abo, the Satanic cult leader
- Paula Arundell as Diane, an audience member who participates in a cold reading performed by Christou
- Christopher Kirby as Phil, a crew member working with Night Owls
- John O'May as Walker Bedford, the owner of the UBC television network
- Michael Ironside as the narrator

== Production ==
The film was executive produced by Australian producer Julie Ryan, soon after forming a new partnership with Umbrella Entertainment called Sanctuary Pictures.

Production on Late Night with the Devil was announced on 13 February 2022, with the Emirati studio Image Nation and the American genre label Spooky Pictures attached. Describing their decision to base Late Night with the Devil on a late-night talk show, writer-director duo Cameron and Colin Cairnes stated: "In the '70s and '80s, there was something slightly dangerous about late-night TV. Talk shows in particular were a window into some strange adult world. We thought combining that charged, live-to-air atmosphere with the supernatural could make for a uniquely frightening film experience."

The Cairnes brothers offered the role of Jack Delroy to David Dastmalchian after reading an article Dastmalchian wrote for the magazine Fangoria about regional TV horror hosts. Dastmalchian accepted the part after being sent a lookbook designed to resemble a 1970s TV Guide, along with the film's script. Dastmalchian's casting was announced on 24 June 2022. Ian Bliss, who played Carmichael Haig, was originally set to play another character, but days prior to filming starting he was told to read for Haig, as the actor who was originally set to play Haig had withdrawn from filming.

Late Night with the Devil was shot in Melbourne, Australia. It utilises practical special effects, including puppetry, along with digital visual effects.

== Release ==
Late Night with the Devil had its world premiere at the South by Southwest Film Festival (SXSW) on 10 March 2023 in Austin, Texas, where it played as part of the festival's "Midnighters" section.

In October 2023, IFC Films and Shudder acquired the distribution rights for North America, United Kingdom, and Ireland. Umbrella Entertainment, Maslow Entertainment, and Ahi Films are distributing the film in Australia and New Zealand.

== Reception ==
In March 2023, horror author Stephen King was provided with an advance screener of the film and tweeted, "It's absolutely brilliant. I couldn't take my eyes off it. Your results may vary, as they say, but I urge you to watch it when you can." The film screened at the Sydney Film Festival from 9–15 June 2023.

=== Home media ===
The film was released on limited glow-in-the-dark VHS on 28 October 2024.

=== Box office ===
Late Night with the Devil grossed $10 million in the United States and Canada, and $6.8 million in other territories, for a worldwide total of $16.8 million.

The film opened on 22 March 2024 in 1,034 theaters in the United States and Canada, and earned $2.8 million in its opening weekend, the best debut for an IFC Films release; additionally, media outlets noted that the total included an estimated $666,666 gross on its third day. Expanding to 1,442 theaters the following weekend, the film made $2.2 million, finishing in seventh.

=== Critical response ===
On the review aggregator website Rotten Tomatoes, 97% of 239 critics' reviews are positive, with an average rating of 7.8/10. The website's consensus reads: "Delightfully dark, Late Night with the Devil proves possession horror isn't played out – and serves as an outstanding showcase for David Dastmalchian." Metacritic, which uses a weighted average, assigned the film a score of 72 out of 100, based on 22 critics, indicating "generally favorable" reviews.

Variety's Dennis Harvey commended the film's production design and technical aspects, as well as that of the cast, and wrote that the film's "mix of vintage Me Decade showbiz cheese and Exorcist-y demonic doings is distinctive, not to mention deftly handled by the [Cairnes] brothers as both writers and directors." Brian Tallerico of RogerEbert.com praised the film as inventive and its use of the found footage format as clever, and highlighted Dastmalchian's "phenomenally committed performance [...] really holding the film together as he finds the right tone between smarmy and likable that dominated so much '70s culture."

Meagan Navarro of Bloody Disgusting gave the film a score of three-and-a-half out of five, criticizing the film's pacing as rapid but writing that "the ingenuity, the painstaking period recreation, a riveting performance by Dastmalchian, and a showstopper of a finale make for one Halloween event you won't want to miss." Trace Sauveur of The Austin Chronicle also praised Dastmalchian's performance and called the film "totally gimmicky, but the sincere commitment to the conceit is what really makes this work." Sauveur adds that, despite finding the film's conclusion lacking, "Late Night with the Devil is able to mine plenty of effective and fun ideas out of its premise, and it works as a potent examination of the price of success."

Mark Kermode of Kermode and Mayo's Take called it "really enjoyable", adding that he thought it was influenced by the 1992 British mockumentary supernatural horror TV film Ghostwatch.

Wendy Ide of The Observer gave the film a score of four out of five stars, praising its satire and comedic elements, calling it "[s]mart, cynical and at times devilishly funny, the film delivers a crackle of disruptive static to the demonic possession genre."

John Lui of The Straits Times gave the film 4 stars in which he describes the film as "Comedy, horror and homage come together in style in this hugely enjoyable work". For Entertainment Weekly, Allaire Nuss wrote that Late Night with the Devil, which she described as being presented in a mockumentary and analog horror format, was "the first great scary movie of 2024" and that she "adored every second of it".

=== Use of artificial intelligence ===
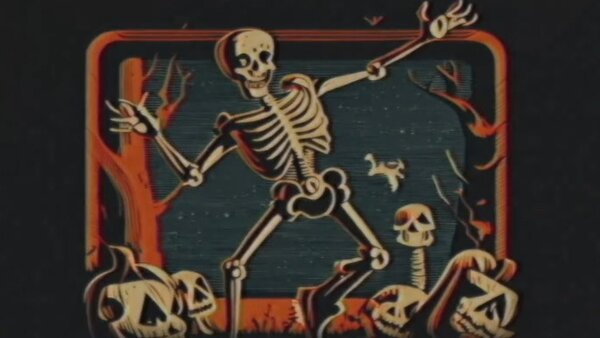
AI-generated image in a screenshot from Late Night with the Devil

In the week leading up to the film's release, some reviewers criticized the use of AI-generated images which were not present in the version screened at SXSW. The directors said that they "experimented with AI for three still images which we edited further and ultimately appear as very brief interstitials in the film."

=== Accolades ===
Award	Date of ceremony	Category	Recipient(s)	Result	Ref.
AWGIE Awards	15 February 2024	Feature Film – Original	Colin and Cameron Cairnes	Won	
Fangoria Chainsaw Awards	4 November 2024	Best Wide Release	Colin and Cameron Cairnes	Nominated	
Fangoria Chainsaw Awards	4 November 2024	Best Lead Performance	David Dastmalchian	Won	
Fangoria Chainsaw Awards	4 November 2024	Best Screenplay	Colin and Cameron Cairnes	Won	
Fangoria Chainsaw Awards	4 November 2024	Best Costume Design	Steph Hooke	Nominated	
St. Louis Film Critics Association	15 December 2024	Best Horror Film	Late Night with the Devil	Nominated	
Kansas City Film Critics Circle	5 January 2025	Best Actor	David Dastmalchian	Won	
Saturn Awards	2 February 2025	Best Independent Film	Late Night with the Devil	Won	
Saturn Awards	2 February 2025	Best Actor in a Film	David Dastmalchian	Nominated	
AACTA Awards	7 February 2025	Best Film	Mathew Govoni, Adam White	Nominated	
AACTA Awards	7 February 2025	Best Direction	Colin Cairnes, Cameron Cairnes	Nominated	
AACTA Awards	7 February 2025	Best Screenplay in Film	Colin Cairnes, Cameron Cairnes	Nominated	
AACTA Awards	7 February 2025	Best Lead Actor	David Dastmalchian	Nominated	
AACTA Awards	7 February 2025	Best Lead Actress	Laura Gordon	Nominated	
AACTA Awards	7 February 2025	Best Supporting Actor	Fayssal Bazzi	Nominated	
AACTA Awards	7 February 2025	Best Supporting Actress	Ingrid Torelli	Nominated	
AACTA Awards	7 February 2025	Best Cinematography	Matthew Temple	Nominated	
AACTA Awards	7 February 2025	Best Editing	Cameron Cairnes, Colin Cairnes	Nominated	
AACTA Awards	7 February 2025	Best Original Music Score	Roscoe James Irwin, Glenn Richards	Nominated	
AACTA Awards	7 February 2025	Best Sound	Emma Bortignon, Manel Lopez, Pete Smith, Cameron Grant	Nominated	
AACTA Awards	7 February 2025	Best Production Design	Otello Stolfo	Nominated	
AACTA Awards	7 February 2025	Best Costume Design	Steph Hooke	Nominated	
AACTA Awards	7 February 2025	Best Casting	Leigh Pickford	Nominated	
Australian Film Critics Association Awards	22 March 2025	Best Australian Film		Nominated	
Australian Film Critics Association Awards	22 March 2025	Best Australian Director	Colin and Cameron Cairnes	Nominated	
Australian Film Critics Association Awards	22 March 2025	Best Actor	David Dastmalchian	Nominated	
Australian Film Critics Association Awards	22 March 2025	Best Actress	Laura Gordon	Nominated	
Australian Film Critics Association Awards	22 March 2025	Best Supporting Actor	Ian Bliss	Nominated	
Australian Film Critics Association Awards	22 March 2025	Best Supporting Actress	Ingrid Torelli	Nominated	
Australian Film Critics Association Awards	22 March 2025	Best Screenplay	Colin and Cameron Cairnes	Nominated	
Australian Film Critics Association Awards	22 March 2025	Best Cinematography	Matthew Temple	Nominated	
Critics' Choice Super Awards	7 August 2025	Best Actor in a Horror Movie	David Dastmalchian	Nominated	

== See also ==
- Sweeps week
- Satanic panic
- Tabloid talk show
