= Cassandra Magrath =

Australian actress

- Born: 1981 (age 43–44); Melbourne, Victoria, Australia
- Occupation: Actress
- Years active: 1994–present

Cassandra Magrath (born 1981) is an Australian actress. She played Miranda Gibson in the Australian ABC 1998–2000 television series SeaChange and Liz Hunter in the 2005 Australian horror film Wolf Creek.

== Acting career ==
Magrath began her acting career aged 11, with a role in the children's television programme Ocean Girl. She also played Charlene in the Australian ABC children's television series The Wayne Manifesto that aired in 1996. Magrath also acted as Alison Pi Renfrey in The Crash Zone in 1998. She also appears in The Butterfly Effect video 'Gone', as well as comedy trio Tripod's 'Xbox Song. In 2016 she starred in Screen Australia's horror film Scare Campaign, directed by the Cairnes brothers (100 Bloody Acres).

== Filmography ==
Year	Title	Role	Notes
1994–95	Ocean Girl	Zoe Kondelos	TV series
1996-97	The Wayne Manifesto	Charlene	TV series
1998–2000	SeaChange	Miranda Gibson	TV series
1998–2001	Crash Zone	Alison Renfrey	TV series
2002	Shock Jock	Stephanie Thom	TV series
2010	The Pacific	Helen	TV miniseries
2012	Miss Fisher’s Murder Mysteries	Myrtle Hill	TV series, S1E13: King Memses' Curse
2012	Neighbours	Celeste McIntyre	TV series
2013	House Husbands	Sarah Weats	TV series, 2 episodes
2013	Winners and Losers	Cynthia Trengrove	TV series, 2 episodes
2013-15	Wentworth	Hayley Jovanka	TV series, 7 episodes
2014	Utopia	Union Rep	TV series, 1 episode
2016	Jack Irish	Rosie	TV series, 1 episode
2016	Moonman	Sergeant	TV movie
2018	Chopper The Untold Story	Sparks	TV miniseries, 1 episode
2018	The Cry	Journo	TV series, 1 episode

=== Film appearances ===
Year	Title	Role	Notes
2022	The Spy Who Never Dies	Suzan	
2022	Nightmare Radio: The Night Stalker	Ellie	
2020	The Green Door	Sophia	
2020	The Unlit	Claire Nash	
2019	The Dustwalker	Angela	
2018	36 Questions	Lydia	
2017	Ali's Wedding	Patient X	Feature film
2017	Liz Drives	Ellie	Short film
2016	Scare Campaign	Suze	Feature film
2015	Pulitzer	Cara	Short film
2011	Vanished	Winona Gant	
2005	Wolf Creek	Liz Hunter	Feature film
