= Scare Campaign =

- Theatrical film poster
- Directed by: Cameron Cairnes; Colin Cairnes
- Written by: Cameron Cairnes; Colin Cairnes
- Produced by: Julie Ryan
- Starring: Meegan Warner; Ian Meadows; Olivia DeJonge; Josh Quong Tart
- Cinematography: John Brawley
- Edited by: Adam White
- Music by: Glenn Richards
- Production companies: Cyan Films; Major International Pictures
- Distributed by: The Klockworx; Bonsai Films; I-On New Media; Madman Entertainment; Studio71
- Release dates: 23 March 2016 (Lyon); 26 November 2016
- Running time: 80 minutes
- Country: Australia
- Language: English

Scare Campaign is a 2016 Australian horror film written and directed by Colin and Cameron Cairnes. It stars Meegan Warner, Ian Meadows, Olivia DeJonge, and Josh Quong Tart.

== Plot ==
Scare Campaign is a hidden camera prank show that has been scaring its targets with old school scares for the last 5 years. Their latest target (John Brumpton) nearly ends up shooting an actress thinking she is a real zombie until the crew reveals that it is a prank. Emma, another actress on the show, speaks to her director and ex-boyfriend Marcus (Ian Meadows) about being more careful who they prank in case they end up scaring "the wrong guy." Their manager, Vicki (Sigrid Thornton) shows them a web series called Masked Freaks that involve a bunch of costumed people killing other people gruesomely. The series threatens Scare Campaign's popularity so Vicki encourages the team to up the ante to increase their ratings.

Hiring a new actress named Abby (Olivia DeJonge), the team takes their next prank to an abandoned psychiatric hospital, where they intend to prank a new groundskeeper, Rohan (Josh Quong Tart). As the prank goes along as planned, Emma starts having second thoughts and leaves Rohan alone, where he explores the asylum through the team's special effects, despite Emma's pleas to end the prank. When Abby is signalled to surprise him, Rohan reacts by stabbing her to death with a letter opener, strangling cameraman Tony and slitting the throat of actress Suze. Emma and special effects specialist J.D. (Patrick Harvey) barricade themselves in a room and beg Marcus and camera operator Dick to call the police. However, Rohan breaks in and kills Marcus and Dick. Emma and J.D. make it to the van to escape, but J.D. runs back inside to find the keys. Rohan appears but Emma stabs his hand and runs inside. I i's then revealed that the whole predicament was a prank and Emma was their new stooge. Trent, the actor playing Rohan, berates Marcus and quits.

Suddenly, Masked Freaks appear with weapons equipped to their cameras and kills Trent, revealing themselves as actual serial killers and not actors as their show made it look. They proceed to murder the other members of Scare Campaign. Marcus tries to warn Emma, who ignores him after discovering she was the real stooge of their prank. Later, she believes him and they find Suze's body and witness Tony getting killed. Masked Freaks hack into Scare Campaign's computer and reveal they do what they do for the new generation of online entertainment. They bury Abby alive and give Marcus and Emma five minutes to save her. Marcus and Emma run out to save Abby and kill one of the Masked Freaks, who is revealed to be merely a teenager. After saving Abby, they are surrounded by the Masked Freaks and their boss tells Emma she may leave with either Marcus or Abby. She chooses Abby and kisses Marcus before leaving. While they are driving away, the Masked Freaks reveal to Marcus that Abby was their spy the whole time before wheeling Marcus on a stretcher into a furnace. On the drive back to town, Emma notices one of the Masked Freaks cameras in the van pointing at her, leaving her to wonder about Abby's involvement.

== Cast ==
- Meegan Warner as Emma
- Ian Meadows as Marcus
- Olivia DeJonge as Abby
- Josh Quong Tart as Trent
- Patrick Harvey as J.D.
- Cassandra Magrath as Suze
- Steve Mouzakis as Tony
- John Brumpton as George
- Sigrid Thornton as Vicki
- Kaiting Yap as Ayako
- Jason Geary as Dick

== Reception ==
Andrew L. Urban at UrbanCinefile.com gave the film a positive review and wrote, "Propelled by an ever-inventive screenplay, Scare Campaign revels in surprising us while scaring us. To its credit, we don't see the twists coming, and the Russian Doll-type structure gives the film a rich texture."

=== Accolades ===
Award	Category	Subject	Result
ASSG Award	Best Achievement in Sound for Film Sound Design	Steve Burgess	Nominated
ASSG Award	Best Achievement in Sound for Film Sound Design	Chris Goodes	Nominated
ASSG Award	Best Achievement in Sound for Film Sound Design	Liesl Pieterse	Nominated
ASSG Award	Best Achievement in Sound for Film Sound Design	Alex Francis	Nominated
ASSG Award	Best Achievement in Sound for Film Sound Design	Mario Vaccaro	Nominated
ASSG Award	Best Achievement in Sound for Film Sound Design	Diego Ruiz	Nominated
Monster Fest Jury Prize	Best Film	Cameron & Colin Cairnes	Won
Monster Fest Jury Prize	Best Director	Cameron & Colin Cairnes	Won
Monster Fest Jury Prize	Best Feature Screenplay	Cameron & Colin Cairnes	Won
Monster Fest Jury Prize	Best Sound in a Feature	Steve Burgess	Won
