= Isabella Dunwill =

Australian actress

- Born: Isabella Dunwill; Australia
- Occupation: Actress
- Years active: 1998–present

Isabella Dunwill is an Australian actress best known for her role in iconic Australian soap opera Neighbours.

Initially signing on for a two-episode role as Geri Hallett, she was a recurring cast member between 1998 and 2001. Before this she had small parts in various Australian television shows, including Frontline and Horace and Tina.

After leaving Neighbours, Dunwill took roles in Australian television dramas Stingers and The Secret Life of Us. She has since studied at the Australian National Institute of Dramatic Art (graduating in 2003) and has had roles both on stage and on screen, including What the Butler Saw directed by Jim Sharman, for Belvoir Street Theatre Company B, feature film WIL independent short film A Black and White World and television series Thank God You're Here.

Dunwill's other screen credits include: Carla Cametti PD, Satisfaction and Halifax f.p. and the AFI winning short film, The Projectionist.

On stage she appeared in Jim Sharman's production of What the Butler Saw (Belvoir Street, the Bell Shakespeare Company's Actors at Work tour 2007, Scarlett O'Hara at the Crimson Parrot workshop at Melbourne Theatre Company, Denise Baudu in The Department Store at the Old Fitzroy Theatre, Cassandra in Theatre @ Risk's Requiem for the 20th Century, and La Mama's The Devil's Dictionary.

Dunwill was also a motion capture artist for the feature film Constantine and various other popular computer games including Stalker.

She is the lead voice of Polvina the octopus sea princess in the animated children's series Sea Princesses on Channel 7 and the voice of Amy, the blue dressed teddy bear in the animated 3D television series Bananas in Pyjamas.

== Filmography ==
=== Film ===
| Year | Title | Role | Type |
|---|---|---|---|
| 2006 | WIL | Kate, the Secretary | Feature film |
| | The Projectionist | | Short film |
| 2005 | A Black and White World | Mary | Short film |

=== Television ===
| Year | Title | Role | Type |
|---|---|---|---|
| | Frontline | | TV series |
| 1998-2001 | Neighbours | Geri Hallett | TV series, 45 episodes |
| 2001 | Horace and Tina | | TV series |
| | Stingers | | TV series |
| | The Secret Life of Us | | TV series |
| | Thank God You're Here | Guest | TV series |
| 2009 | Carla Cametti PD | | TV miniseries |
| | Satisfaction | | TV series |
| | Halifax f.p. | | TV series |
| 2008 | Sea Princesses | Polvina (voice) | Animated TV series |
| 2009-12 | Pixel Pinkie | Nina (voice) | Animated TV series |
| 2011-13 | Bananas in Pyjamas | Amy the Teddybear (voice) | Animated TV series |
