= Between Two Waves =

2012 play by Ian Meadows

- Author: Ian Meadows
- Cover artist: Design: Interbrand. Pictured: Ian Meadows. Photographer: Katae Kaars.
- Language: English
- Genre: Play
- Publisher: Currency Press
- Publication date: 2012
- Publication place: Australia
- Media type: Print (Paperback)
- ISBN: 978-0-86819-949-8

Between Two Waves is a play by Australian playwright Ian Meadows. It was first produced by Griffin Theatre Company in 2012.

== Plot ==
Daniel – a climatologist and advisor to the government – loses a lifetime of research in a flood. When Fiona tells Daniel they're about to start a family, Daniel must choose between what he can predict and what he can't.

== First production ==
Between Two Waves was first produced by Griffin Theatre Company at the SBW Stables Theatre, Sydney, on 5 October 2012, with the following cast:

- JIMMY: Chum Ehelepola
- GRENELLE: Rachel Gordon
- DANIEL: Ian Meadows
- FIONA: Ash Ricardo
- Director, Sam Strong
- Dramaturg, Tahli Corin
- Assistant Director, Mackenzie Steele
- Designer, David Fleischer
- Lighting Designer, Matthew Marshall
- Sound Designer and Composer, Steve Francis
- Audio-Visual Designer, Steve Toulmin

Between Two Waves was developed with the Griffin Theatre Company with assistance from Screen NSW.
