= Girls Against Boys (film) =

- Theatrical release poster
- Directed by: Austin Chick
- Written by: Austin Chick
- Produced by: Clay Floren; Aimee Shieh
- Starring: Danielle Panabaker; Nicole LaLiberte; Liam Aiken; Michael Stahl-David; Andrew Howard
- Cinematography: Kat Westergaard
- Edited by: Pete Beaudreau
- Music by: Nathan Larson
- Production company: Floren Shieh Productions
- Distributed by: Anchor Bay Films
- Release dates: March 9, 2012 (SXSW); February 1, 2013 (United States)
- Running time: 93 minutes
- Country: United States
- Language: English
- Box office: $7,529

Girls Against Boys is a 2012 American horror thriller film written and directed by Austin Chick and starring Danielle Panabaker and Nicole LaLiberte.

== Plot ==
College student Shae blows off going to a party with her friend Karen to go to the Hamptons for the weekend with her boyfriend Terry, an older man who is separated from his wife. That evening, Terry comes to her apartment. He apologizes and says that they cannot see each other anymore, as he and his wife have decided to reconcile, for the sake of their young daughter. The next day, Shae goes shopping at a market and sees Terry with his wife and daughter. She follows them to their house and he notices her. They do not speak, and she leaves after he closes the door. That night, she goes to the bar where she works. During her shift, she goes to the cloak-room and starts crying. Her colleague Lu comforts her and invites her out for a drink over her break-up with Terry.

Shae and Lu go out to another bar where they meet Simon, Eric, and Duncan. They drink and dance with them and then go over to Eric and Duncan's apartment. Shae kisses Simon and then goes to the bathroom, where she passes out, drunk. Feeling unwell again, Shae decides to go home. Simon offers to take her home, saying that he is about to leave anyway. They take a taxi together and are dropped off outside her apartment building. He asks if he can come up, but she tells him she has a boyfriend. He persists, asking first for her number and then for a kiss goodnight. She tells him to leave, but he violently grabs her neck and forcibly kisses her. She hits him and runs upstairs. Before she can unlock her door, he catches her, pushes her onto the floor and rapes her.

Later, in her apartment, Shae tries to call her mother and Karen, but can only reach their voicemails. With no one to talk to, she goes to Terry's house. He takes her home, furious that she has turned up at his house unannounced. They go into her apartment and Shae hugs him, not having told him that she was raped. He misunderstands and starts kissing her. She tells him to stop but he goes on. She shouts at him to get off her and starts crying. He leaves, telling her that he does not know what she wants from him.

The next day, Shae and Lu go to a police station to report the crime. There, the hostile and skeptical Officer Daniels gives Shae paperwork to fill in and sends her to the waiting area. Shae files her report with an unsympathetic detective and Lu notices Daniels looking at her. She flirts with him and asks him if he wants to go somewhere to have sex. They go to a local hotel where Lu cuffs him to the bed and shoots him with his gun.

Lu goes to Shae's apartment and tells her that they need to deal with the situation themselves. They return to Eric and Duncan's apartment and probe Duncan for Simon's address. He does not know it, and when he mocks them about how Eric told them he and Shae had sex, Lu shoots him dead. When Eric returns, he gives them Simon's address, before Lu shoots him too. They go to Simon's workshop and find him working alone. Shae knocks him unconscious and they tie him to a table. When he awakens, they torture him by dismembering him and then kill him.

Next, they ambush Terry, holding him at gunpoint and driving him off in his own car. They drive to a secluded part of the woods and take him out of the car. Shae points the gun at him and he begs for her mercy. She cannot bring herself to kill him and he starts to run away, but Lu takes the gun and shoots him. They stay in a motel that night and when Shae starts crying, Lu gets into bed with her and holds her. The next morning, they talk about what they did and while Shae says that killing all those men who wronged her did not make her feel any better, Lu says that she enjoys killing and hurting people. They go home and return to their normal lives.

After class, Shae is invited out by her classmate Tyler and they go to the fair. She goes back to her apartment that evening and finds Lu waiting for her, annoyed that she is back so late because she had expected to surprise her with a dinner.

Shae goes to a Halloween party with Tyler. Lu secretly arrives. When Shae is in the bathroom and everyone else is watching fireworks on the roof, Lu kills Tyler with a sword. Shae sees his body and returns home, finding Lu's sword on a table. Lu steps out of the shower stark-naked and tells Shae that she did it "for us" and to "protect" her. Shae takes the sword and slices Lu across the abdomen. Lu whispers that she loves Shae before bleeding to death.

Sometime later, Shae returns to work at the bar. During a break, she is interrupted by a crying co-worker. Shae asks her: "Is it a guy?", and the woman replies that it is. As the two sit together, a vision of Lu appears behind Shae.

== Cast ==
- Danielle Panabaker as Shae
- Nicole LaLiberte as Lu
- Andrew Howard as Terry
- Michael Stahl-David as Simon
- Liam Aiken as Tyler
- Carmine DiBenedetto as Eric
- Will Brill as Duncan
- Matthew Rauch as Officer Daniels
- Reyna de Courcy as Karen
- Kelvin Hale as "Big Gulp"
- James Ortiz as Drag Queen
- Makenzie Leigh as Crying Girl
- Caroline Lagerfelt as Professor Sara Randolph
- Suzie Cho as Officer Ramirez

== Reception ==
The film received negative reviews from critics, holding a score of 25% on review aggregator Rotten Tomatoes based on 24 reviews, with an average of 4.1/10. Metacritic, which assigns a weighted average, reports a score of 17 out of 100 based on 8 critics, indicating "overwhelming dislike".
