= Killing Ground (film) =

- Film poster
- Directed by: Damien Power
- Screenplay by: Damien Power
- Produced by: Lisa Shaunessy; Joe Weatherstone
- Starring: Harriet Dyer; Ian Meadows; Aaron Pedersen
- Cinematography: Simon Chapman
- Edited by: Katie Flaxman
- Music by: Leah Curtis
- Distributed by: IFC Midnight
- Release dates: August 4, 2016 (Melbourne); July 21, 2017 (United States)
- Running time: 88 minutes
- Country: Australia
- Language: English

Killing Ground is a 2016 Australian horror thriller film written and directed by Damien Power and starring Harriet Dyer, Ian Meadows and Aaron Pedersen.

== Plot ==
Ian Smith and his girlfriend Samantha “Sam” Shaw head to a remote beach for a romantic trip for New Year's Eve. On the way, Ian meets Scotty “German” Shepherd, a local man who tells them about a nice spot near a waterfall. When they arrive there, they set up camp next to an abandoned campsite with no trace of its occupants.

After a few nights, they become concerned when they discover a toddler on his own in the woods. Meanwhile, elsewhere, German tells his associate Todd “Chook” Fowler about Ian and Sam, and the two begin to make plans. Chook finds Ian and Sam with the baby stuck at the campsite parking lot with a flat tire. He persuades Ian to go and search for the missing family, while Sam stays at the car with the child.

Three days earlier, the Voss-Baker family - Robert Baker, Margaret Voss, their 16-year-old daughter Emily, and their infant son, Ollie - had been camping on the beach. German and Chook showed up at the campsite and kidnapped Robert, Margaret, and Emily but are unaware of Ollie's presence. German and Chook raped Margaret and Emily and tortured the family before murdering them all. After spotting Ollie in a photo on Emily's cell phone, they returned to search for him, but he had wandered off.

Back to the present, Chook leads Ian to where he and German left the Bakers' bodies. When they arrive, they discover that Margaret didn't die from her injuries. Ian tries to save her, but Chook shoots her dead. Chook then explains his intent to rape Sam, so Ian charges forward and knocks him down, then flees into the woodland. Meanwhile, German arrives at the campsite to find Sam alone with Ollie. German tries to abduct Sam from the car, but she slashes his wrist and escapes with Ollie. German chases them along with his dog, Banjo.

While hunting Ian, Chook mistakenly shoots German, then kills him to put him out of his misery. Nearby, Ollie begins to cry, giving away his and Sam's location. Chook slams Ollie into the ground, seemingly killing him, and takes Sam hostage. He tells Ian he will be waiting at the killing ground where the Bakers are, and they leave.

Ian comes out of hiding and notices German's car keys in his pocket. Meanwhile, at the killing ground, Chook grows impatient that Ian hasn't come to save Sam, so he threatens to rape her. He then hears Ian escaping in German's truck and drags Sam off with him as he attempts to intercept him. When they pass German's corpse, Sam notices that Ollie is missing. While in Chook's car, Sam fights with him, leading to him crashing into a tree, knocking them both unconscious.

As night falls, Ian arrives at the police station and asks for help. He accompanies two officers to the campsite. Sam awakens in the wreck of the car with her hands tied to the steering wheel. The officers spot the wreckage and attempt to help, but Chook shoots them dead. Chook also shoots Ian in the arm, holds him hostage, and demands Sam drive him to a safe location. Sam asks Ian if Ollie is okay, but Ian tells her that Ollie was never with him.

While driving away from the woodland, Sam violently crashes the vehicle. Chook manages to crawl away from the wreckage and scuffles with Sam before she smashes his head with a rock, finally killing him. Later on, Sam wakes up in a hospital and leaves her bed to find Ian recovering from his injuries in another room.

Meanwhile, Ollie is revealed to have survived Chook's attack and has crawled away from German's corpse while Banjo sits silently guarding him. Their final fate remains unknown.

== Cast ==
- Harriet Dyer as Samantha "Sam" Shaw
- Ian Meadows as Ian Smith
- Aaron Pedersen as Scotty "German" Shepherd
- Aaron Glenane as Todd "Chook" Fowler
- Maya Stange as Margaret Voss
- Julian Garner as Robert Baker
- Tiarnie Coupland as Emily Baker
- Liam Parkes and Riley Parkes as Ollie Baker

== Reception ==
Killing Ground received mixed reviews. On review aggregator website Rotten Tomatoes, the film holds an approval rating of 76% based on 66 reviews, and an average rating of 6.21/10. The website's critical consensus reads, "Killing Ground unnerves and compels in equal measure with a grimly intense story that may be too disturbing for some but delivers a white-knuckle experience for fans of brutally realistic thrillers." On Metacritic, the film has a weighted average score of 59 out of 100, based on 16 critics, indicating "mixed or average reviews".

Ken Jaworowski of The New York Times, in a negative review, observed that the film "features a man and a woman who make head-slappingly dumb choices... in the end, the most regrettable decision may be that of audience members who fork over money to see the movie.' He was critical of the tone and content of the film: "...two plots... intertwine and, after a lengthy intro, move toward some revolting cruelness"; "Damien Power, who also wrote the script, cites ’70s “survival thrillers” as his inspiration... this movie has the hallmarks of torture porn: gratuitous slaughter, remorseless murderers and gruesome acts." Kimber Myers of the Los Angeles Times more positively concluded the film to be "an effective indie creeper that unnerves the audience with its all-too-realistic violence."

Jim Schembri of 3AW gave a positive review, writing "The old scary movie convention about something bad going on in the woods gets an inventive, chillingly effective makeover in the outstanding debut film from Tasmanian writer/director Damien Power... An accomplished, edge-of-the-seat thriller." Jake Wilson of The Age (Australia) wrote "For a first feature, Killing Ground is highly accomplished." Luke Buckmaster of The Guardian wrote, "Killing Ground combines great aesthetic elegance - including beautiful cinematography and naturalistic editing - with an acrid, lingering foulness, derived from knife-edge performances and a terrifying premise executed with airtight verisimilitude." Chris Evangelista of /Film wrote a similar review, writing "The true highlight of Killing Ground is the editing, courtesy of Katie Flaxman, which weaves together the multiple narratives in a concise manner."

Lucy Randall of 4:3 gave a negative review, writing "While Killing Ground may prove a solid stepping stone for its director in terms of the Hollywood marketplace, the film itself is unlikely to be remembered in the oeuvre to which it speaks." Craig Mathieson of The Sunday Age wrote "The terror for the audience is blunt and bludgeoning, but conversely Power is an accomplished stylist who adroitly keeps the camera on the edge of increasingly bad expectations."

=== Accolades ===
Killing Ground was nominated for Best Sound at the 7th AACTA Awards.
