= The Invitation (2022 film) =

2022 film by Jessica M. Thompson

- Theatrical release poster
- Directed by: Jessica M. Thompson
- Written by: Blair Butler
- Produced by: Emile Gladstone
- Starring: Nathalie Emmanuel; Thomas Doherty; Stephanie Corneliussen; Alana Boden; Hugh Skinner; Sean Pertwee
- Cinematography: Autumn Eakin
- Edited by: Tom Elkins
- Music by: Dara Taylor
- Production companies: Screen Gems; Mid Atlantic Films
- Distributed by: Sony Pictures Releasing
- Release date: August 26, 2022
- Running time: 104 minutes
- Country: United States
- Language: English
- Budget: $10 million
- Box office: $38 million

The Invitation is a 2022 American horror film directed by Jessica M. Thompson and written by Blair Butler. It stars Nathalie Emmanuel and Thomas Doherty. Inspired by the novel Dracula by Bram Stoker, it follows a woman who, after her mother's death, meets long-lost family members and discovers the dark secrets they carry.

Originally titled The Bride, it was produced by Emile Gladstone through his Latchkey Productions, Sam Raimi and Robert Tapert's Ghost House Pictures, with Butler writing the script. However, Raimi and Tapert exited due to scheduling conflicts. By 2020, the film's director, producer and new title were announced. Casting occurred from May to October 2021, with filming beginning that September in Budapest.

The Invitation was released theatrically in the United States on August 26, 2022, by Sony Pictures Releasing. The film received generally negative reviews, with critics praising Emmanuel's acting but criticizing the story, screenplay, and horror elements. The film was a box office success, grossing $38 million worldwide on a $10 million budget.

== Plot ==
A young woman is imprisoned in a room in a large stately home, later revealed to be New Carfax Abbey. She escapes and, despite the search party's pleas, hangs herself from the staircase.

In present-day New York City, struggling artist Evelyn "Evie" Jackson works for a catering business alongside her best friend Grace. Following her mother's death, Evie takes a DNA test and discovers a distant cousin in England, Oliver Alexander. When they meet, Oliver tells her of the scandal surrounding her great-grandmother, Emmaline, who had a secret child with a Black footman.

Oliver invites Evie to a family wedding in England. She travels to Whitby and arrives at New Carfax Abbey, where she meets the manor's owner, Walter De Ville; Mrs. Swift, a longtime maid; and De Ville's devoted butler, "Mr. Field". She also meets the Alexander family and the maids of honor, friendly Lucy and condescending Viktoria.

Evie and Walter develop a mutual attraction, while several housemaids mysteriously disappear after being attacked by an unseen force under Mr. Field's supervision. One night, Evie sees an apparition in her bedroom. The following day, she enters Walter's office and discovers that he has been researching her. She confronts him and threatens to leave, but they reconcile and have sex.

At the family's rehearsal dinner, Evie expects to meet the bride and groom. Instead, Walter announces that he and Evie will marry. Mr. Field then slits a maid's throat and serves her blood in wine glasses to Walter, Lucy, and Viktoria, revealing that they are vampires. Walter explains that the Alexanders are one of three families that have each supplied a woman to become his wife for centuries, receiving protection and wealth in return. Viktoria, Lucy, and Emmaline were his previous wives. Emmaline eventually killed herself, tormented by her guilt over killing humans and the loss of her lover, Evie's great-grandfather, and their infant son. Unable to find another suitable woman in the family, the Alexanders tracked down Evie.

Imprisoned in the cellar, Evie is visited by Lucy and Viktoria. Viktoria reveals that she was the apparition and shows Evie Dee, a maid imprisoned after disappearing days earlier. Viktoria locks Evie in a coffin, but Mrs. Swift, who was friends with Emmaline, frees her.

Evie hides in an ice house on the estate grounds, where she discovers the murdered maids and Mrs. Swift's body. Mr. Field has killed Mrs. Swift. Evie escapes into town and seeks help from an elderly couple, who identify themselves as Jonathan and Mina Harker. They work for De Ville and render Evie unconscious. She awakens to find De Ville feeding on Imogen, another maid, and learns that he is Dracula.

Dracula forces Evie to marry him, with Dee bound beside the altar as a sacrifice. As they exchange vows, Evie bites Dracula's arm and drinks his blood, transforming into a vampire. She sets the wedding chapel alight and stabs him in the heart, causing him to age rapidly, before escaping with Dee. Viktoria ambushes Evie, but Lucy intervenes. During their fight, Lucy impales both herself and Viktoria on a spear, reducing them to ashes.

Mr. Field attacks Evie, but she overpowers and kills him. Dracula then seizes her by the throat. Evie severs his wrist to break free and kicks him into the flames, killing him. His death strips her of her powers, restoring her human form. She escapes as the manor burns.

Two weeks later, in London, Evie and Grace track down Oliver, who is preparing to flee after bribing the police. Having discovered his role in deceiving Evie and facilitating the vampires' murders, they intend to kill him.

== Cast ==
- Nathalie Emmanuel as Evelyn (Evie) Alexander
- Thomas Doherty as De Ville
- Stephanie Corneliussen as Viktoria
- Alana Boden as Lucy
- Hugh Skinner as Oliver
- Sean Pertwee as "Mr. Fields" (credited as Renfield)
- Carol Ann Crawford as Mrs. Swift
- Courtney Taylor as Grace
- Tian Chaudhry as Dee

== Production ==
In April 2019, Screen Gems acquired an untitled pitch from Blair Butler, who was also attached to write the screenplay. Emile Gladstone through his Latchkey Productions and Sam Raimi and Robert Tapert were on board to produce the film for their production company Ghost House Pictures; however, they eventually exited the project. In June 2020, it was revealed that the film would be titled The Bride and that Jessica M. Thompson was set to direct, with Gladstone producing without Raimi and Tapert. The original script was written by Butler, who drew inspiration from Bram Stoker's 1897 novel Dracula, with revisions by Thompson. In June 2022, the film's new title was announced as The Invitation.

Nathalie Emmanuel and Garrett Hedlund were cast in lead roles in May 2021. That August, Alana Boden and Stephanie Corneliussen were added to the main cast. In October, Thomas Doherty, Hugh Skinner, Sean Pertwee, and Courtney Taylor joined the cast, with Doherty replacing Hedlund.

Principal photography began in September 2021 in Budapest, Hungary.

== Release ==
The Invitation was released theatrically in the United States on August 26, 2022, by Sony Pictures Releasing. The film was released digitally on September 16, 2022, and on Blu-ray and DVD on October 25, 2022. As part of Netflix's first window deal with Sony, the film was released in the United States on December 24, 2022. For the week ending January 1, 2023, the film was number 5 on the global chart of Netflix views, with 12.2 million hours viewed on the service.

== Reception ==
=== Box office ===
The Invitation grossed $25.1 million in the United States and Canada, and $12.9 million in other territories, for a worldwide total of $38 million, against a budget of $10 million. Deadline Hollywood later reported the film turned a profit for the studio.

In the United States and Canada, The Invitation was released alongside Three Thousand Years of Longing and Breaking. The film made $2.6 million on its first day (including $775,000 from Thursday night previews) and went on to debut $6.8 million from 3,114 theaters. It was the lowest-grossing film to top the box office since Spiral ($4.5 million) in May 2021. In its second weekend, the film made $4.7 million (and a total of $5.7 million over the four-day Labor Day frame), dropping 30.7% and finishing fifth.

=== Critical response ===
On the review aggregator website Rotten Tomatoes, 29% of 66 critics' reviews are positive, with an average rating of 4.7/10. The website's consensus reads: "Despite a very likable lead and a refreshingly light touch, The Invitation is ultimately too predictable to thrill as either a romance or a horror story." Metacritic, which uses a weighted average, assigned the film a score of 45 out of 100, based on 14 critics, indicating "mixed or average" reviews. Audiences polled by CinemaScore gave the film an average grade of "C" on an A+ to F scale.

Natalia Winkelman of The New York Times wrote: "For a fright-fest as broad as this one, there's an awful lot of banal dialogue, and the scare patterns are repetitive enough that even the easiest startlers (I count myself among them) grow immune early on." Joe Leydon of Variety wrote in his review: "Despite some ambitious efforts to revitalize hoary horror movie tropes with allegorical commentary on race, class and male privilege, [the film] is too wearyingly hackneyed for too much of its running time."
