= The End (Australian TV series) =

Australian TV series

- Genre: Drama
- Created by: Samantha Strauss
- Written by: Samantha Strauss
- Directed by: Jessica M. Thompson; Jonathan Brough
- Country of origin: Australia
- Original language: English
- No. of seasons: 1
- No. of episodes: 10

Production
- Executive producers: Iain Canning; Rachel Gardner; Carly Heaton; Hakan Kousetta; Jamie Laurenson; Liz Lewin; Emile Sherman; Samantha Strauss; Penny Win
- Producer: Louise Smith
- Running time: 30 minutes
- Production company: See-Saw Films

Original release
- Network: Showcase; Sky Atlantic
- Release: February 10 – April 13, 2020

The End is an Australian drama television series that premiered on Fox Showcase and Sky Atlantic in February 2020. The 10-part series was created and written by Samantha Strauss and produced by See-Saw Films. It was directed by Jessica M. Thompson and Jonathan Brough and stars Frances O'Connor, Harriet Walter and Noni Hazlehurst.

The End centres around three generations of family trying their best to navigate how to live meaningfully and die with dignity. The show was praised for its depiction of ageing and exploration of complex themes including euthanasia and suicide. The inspiration for the show came from Strauss's experience watching her grandmother go through life changes after moving into a retirement village she thought she would hate.

== Synopsis ==
English doctor Kate Brennan (Frances O'Connor), a senior registrar specialising in palliative care medicine in Australia, is passionate in her opposition to euthanasia. Her mother, Edie Henley (Harriet Walter) who lives in England, is just as passionate about her right to die. After an incident occurs, Kate must bring Edie out to Australia to be closer to the family. Edie is placed in a nearby retirement village, which is her worst nightmare. Kate struggles with her own problems and children, while trying to find a way back to a relationship with her mother.

== Cast and characters ==
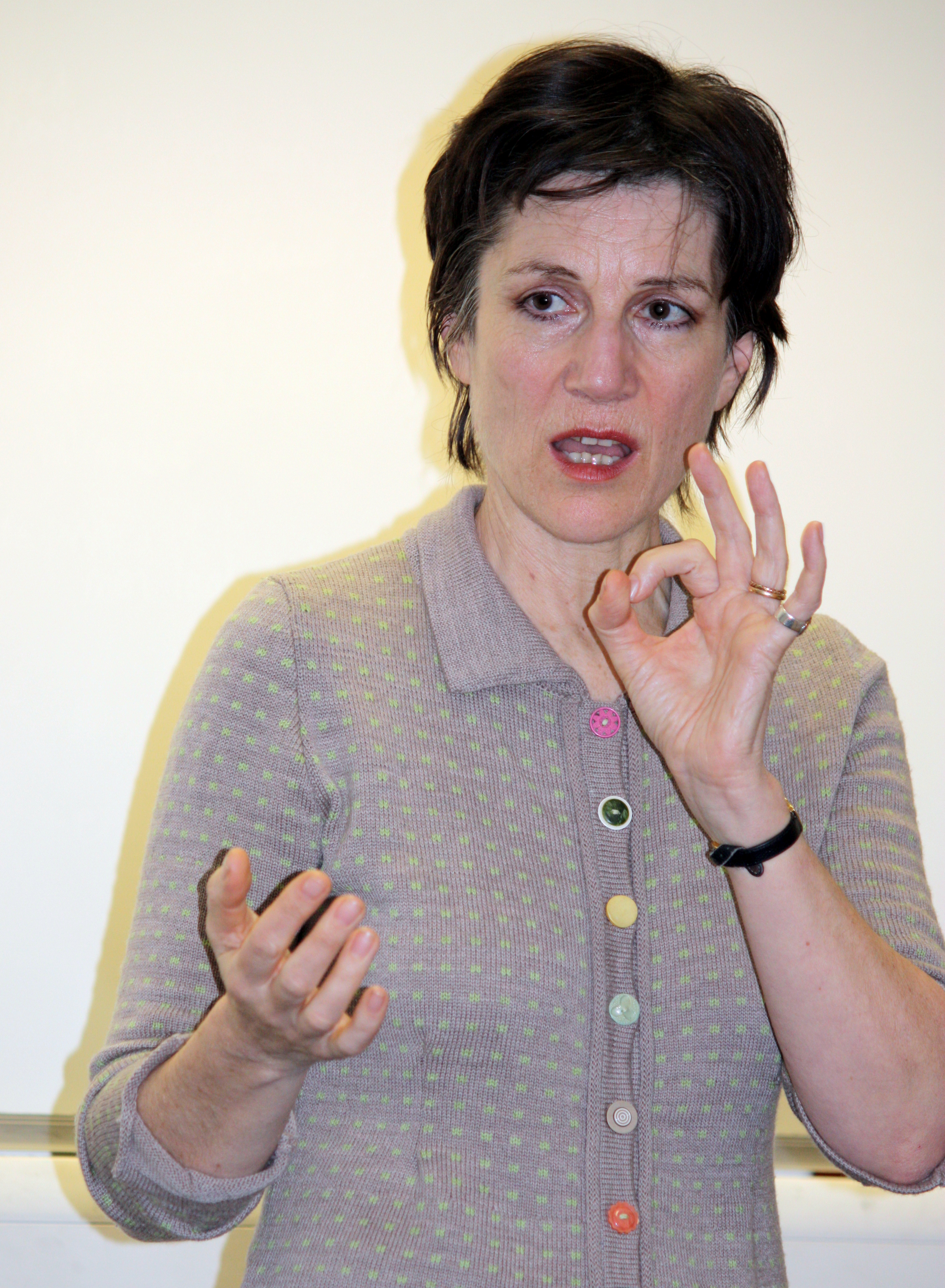
Harriet Walter (pictured)

- Frances O'Connor as Dr Kate Brennan
- Harriet Walter as Edie Henley
- Noni Hazlehurst as Pamela Hardy
- Luke Arnold as Josh
- Ingrid Torelli as Persephone Brennan
- Morgan Davies as Oberon Brennan
- Alex Dimitriades as Dr Nikos Naoumidis
- John Waters as Henry
- Robyn Nevin as Dawn
- Roy Billing as Art
- Diane McLean as Iris
- Kate Peters as Mary
- Andrea Demetriades as Dr Philippa Lee
- Uli Latukefu as Greg the Nurse
- Sebrina Thornton-Walker as Jasper
- Brooke Satchwell as Beth
- Flin Purnama as Colin Rossiter
- Brendan Cowell as Christopher Brennan
- Rebecca Rigg as Ella the Group Leader
- Robert Coleby as Richard
- Gosia Dobrowolska as Mrs Bogdanowicz
- Ling-Hsueh Tang as Lucy Roositer

== Themes ==
=== Euthanasia ===
The End explores the topic of euthanasia and what it means to die with dignity. Euthanasia in Australia has been subject to significant political and public debate. At the time of the show's creation, Queensland, where the show takes place, was the only state in Australia to have not considered any bills relating to Voluntary Assisted Dying. Since the show's release, Queensland has introduced legislation surrounding Euthanasia. The Voluntary Assisted Dying Act 2021 is scheduled to come into effect in 2023.

In the first episode Kate is faced with a moral dilemma, when she is made aware of her patient Beth's (Brooke Satchwell) intention to have a voluntary assisted death. Beth and her husband Josh (Luke Arnold) ask Kate to test the illegal drug they had acquired to ensure its safety when they learn of Kate's strong opposition to euthanasia. "I hate that argument. She's not a dog" is Kate's response when Josh compares the situation to putting down a suffering animal. Later, Kate is seen killing an injured bat in her backyard to end its pain.

=== Suicide ===
Suicide appears many times throughout the show. The End opens with a depressed Edie Henley's unsuccessful attempt to end her own life. As the show continues, so does Edie's attempts, as she struggles to find meaning in her life after her husband's death and the discovery of his previous infidelities. It is revealed that Oberon (Morgan Davies) has recently attempted to end his own life, which brings his relationship with Edie closer. The portrayal of suicide in media has been found to have a positive impact on suicide awareness and help-seeking behaviour.

== Episodes ==
No.	Title	Directed by	Written by	Original release date
1	"Do Not Resuscitate"	Jessica M Thompson	Samantha Strauss	February 10, 2020
Recently widowed Edie Henley, tries to take her own life but is unsuccessful, burning her house down in the process. Edie's daughter Kate flies her out to Australia to be closer to her family. Kate's patient Beth and her husband Josh, asks her to test a drug they intend to use to end Beth's life. Kate is strongly opposed and confiscates the drug. Later, Beth hangs herself in the hospital.
2	"Toxic Shock Syndrome"	Jessica M Thompson	Samantha Strauss	February 17, 2020
Edie meets Pamela, a free spirit who changes her perspective. Oberon takes magic mushrooms and gets stuck after climbing the surfers paradise sign. Edie, Pamela and Persephone perform a rescue mission. Kate fights for her reputation after Beth's death is investigated. Kate attends Beth's wake where an angry Josh kicks her out, blaming Beth's undiginified death on her.
3	"**** Christmas"	Jessica M Thompson	Samantha Strauss	February 24, 2020
Art learns he has vascular dementia. Oberon is lovesick. Edie agrees to be Pamela's back-up singer at the retirement village's annual Christmas show. Josh takes Kate to a support group for the terminally ill to gain a new perspective. Kate must intervene after Josh faces complications assisting with the death of a terminally ill patient from the support group.
4	"Polar Bear"	Jonathan Brough	Samantha Strauss	March 2, 2020
Having turned sixteen, Oberon has the right to start hormone treatment with the permission of both parents. Kate visits Oberon's father in jail to seek his permission, but they are at odds over Oberon's future. Pamela takes Edie on an adventure, where she learns more about Edie's past. A confused Art spends the day doing fun activities, before being escorted home by the police. Kate offers Edie the drug she confiscated from Beth after testing it.
5	"To Be / Not To Be"	Jessica M Thompson	Samantha Strauss	March 9, 2020
With the drug in her possession, Edie gets a new lease on life. Compiling a list of the pros and cons of staying alive. Avoiding Pamela, Edie makes new friends at the retirement village. Kate and Josh take a new step in their relationship. After a trip to Art's new hospice Edie asks Kate for help.
6	"Art vs. Life"	Jonathan Brough	Samantha Strauss	March 16, 2020
Kate is outraged by Edie's proposition to assist Art with ending his life. Speaking with Art changes her mind, and she allows him to take his future into his own hands. After crafting a plan with Edie and Kate, Art takes the drug at the park and passes away. Kate's relationship with Josh continues to grow.
7	"Blood Sandwich"	Jonathan Brough	Samantha Strauss	March 23, 2020
Kate and Eddie work together to cook more of the euthanasia drug. Oberon turns to Edie after a romantic encounter on a camping trip goes wrong. With the help of Edie and Josh, Kate meets with more terminally ill people who may benefit from the drug she possesses.
8	"Metastasized"	Jonathan Brough	Samantha Strauss	March 30, 2020
The police show up at Kate's door. Oberon and Kate are at odds after it is discovered he has been forging her signature to write prescriptions. At a party Edie gives the euthanasia drug to Iris, a village resident, whose husband wishes to end his suffering. Iris, a healthy women ends up taking the drug alongside her husband, causing Edie to panic. Edie and Pamela reconnect and take things to a new level. Kate is unwell.
9	"With Sparkles"	Jessica M Thompson	Samantha Strauss	April 6, 2020
A struggling Kate turns to drinking for the first time in years, believing she has cancer. The retirement village is raided by the police. Dawn is suspicious of Edie's involvement in distributing the euthanasia drug. Meanwhile, Oberon deals with a heartbreak. During a storm, an emotional Oberon runs into the ocean. Persephone follows after him and goes missing under the water.
10	"Picking Scabs"	Jessica M Thompson	Samantha Strauss	April 13, 2020
Persephone is in hospital after nearly drowning from following Oberon into the ocean. Edie and Kate make amends, with Edie realising there are some moments worth living for. Dawn searches Edie's house and finds the euthanasia drugs. Kate learns her cancer fear was actually menopause. Later, Dawn poisons her husband with the drugs she found at Edie's house but ends up regretting it, calling Edie for help.

== International release ==
In United States, the series premiered on July 18, 2021, on Showtime. It is also available to stream on Crave in Canada as of July 18, 2021.

== Reception ==
=== Critical response ===
Rotten Tomatoes, a review aggregator, reported an average approval rating of 76% based on 16 critics, with an average rating of 7.2/10. The website's critic consensus reads "The End's cynical take on life and death may not be as deep as it thinks itself to be, but sharp performances and a few genuinely surprising insights almost make up for it". On Metacritic, it holds a weighted average mark of 59 out of 100 based on 8 critics.

Globally the show received mixed reviews. One review for the Boston Globe reported that the storyline is "too dense at times" but the shows writing is "consistently perceptive". A review for Variety reports the show "can't quite find its tone" but also praises the performance of Harriet Walter and Frances O'Connor for having a "purifying effect". Writing in Roger Ebert, Brian Tallerico criticises the depth of the shows writing, stating that some scenes felt "over-scripted" and "superficial"

The Wrap calls The End "an engrossing watch", praising the way the show presents the complex conversations surrounding life and death and the performance of the cast. The review also writes that some of the writers decisions could have been different to allow the show to come together more meaningfully.

=== Awards and nominations ===
- AACTA Award, nomination, for Best Miniseries (2021)
- AACTA Award, nomination, Noni Hazlehurst, for Best Supporting Actress in a Drama for her role as Pamela Hardy.
