= A Black and White World =

- Directed by: Adam White
- Written by: Adam White
- Produced by: Damala Scales
- Starring: Scott Brennan; Benita Collings; Isabella Dunwill
- Cinematography: Anders Olsen
- Edited by: Adam White
- Music by: Murray Jamieson; Nick Pearce
- Release date: 2 August 2005
- Running time: 9 minutes
- Country: Australia
- Language: English

A Black and White World is a 2005 Australian short film. It is the story of a character in a black-and-white silent film, who transcends the medium and in doing so changes with it. Written and directed by Adam White, the story pays homage to the era of film when silent pictures were being superseded by talkies. On a more simple level, it is a love story about the possibilities of change.

The film was shot on Super16 in studios and locations in Melbourne during September and October 2004. Since screening to cast and crew at the Capitol Theatre, Melbourne in March 2005, A Black and White World has been selected to screen at various international film festivals including the Brisbane International Film Festival (Australia), the Telluride Film Festival (US), the Palm Springs International Festival of Short Films (US), the Manhattan Short Film Festival (US), the Calgary Film Festival (Canada), the Cardiff Film Festival (Wales), and Flickerfest (Australia). In 2006 the film was screened at the US Comedy Arts Festival (US) and the Boulder International Film Festival (US).

== Synopsis ==
A Black and White World is the story of Johnny (Scott Brennan – skitHOUSE), a character on a quest to win back the heart of Mary (Isabella Dunwill), his estranged girlfriend - Adam White based the story on his relationship with his ex-girlfriend. The film uses its simple narrative as a framework to take viewers on a rollercoaster ride through film history as Johnny escapes from his black & white silent filmstrip and encounters sound and colour for the first time. There is also a cameo performance from Benita Collings (Playschool).

== Cast ==
- Scott Brennan - Johnny
- Benita Collings - Florist
- Isabella Dunwill - Mary

== Awards ==
- In 2006 it won the eMovie/Digital Stories Award - Special Mention for Best Digital Video at the ARCIPELAGO-International Festival of Short Films and New Images
