= My Generation (2010 TV series) =

Television series

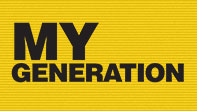
- Also known as: Generation Y
- Genre: Mockumentary; Serial; Comedy drama
- Based on: Blomstertid aka On God's Highway by Peter Magnusson & Martin Persson
- Developed by: Noah Hawley
- Starring: Daniella Alonso; Mehcad Brooks; Kelli Garner; Jaime King; Julian Morris; Keir O'Donnell; Michael Stahl-David; Anne Son; Sebastian Sozzi
- Composer: Jeff Russo
- Country of origin: United States
- Original language: English
- No. of seasons: 1
- No. of episodes: 8

Production
- Executive producers: Noah Hawley; Warren Littlefield; Henrik Bastin; Peter Magnusson; Martin Persson
- Cinematography: Todd McMullen
- Running time: 42-45 minutes
- Production companies: The Littlefield Company; Stockholm-Köpenhamn Productions; 26 Keys Productions; ABC Studios

Original release
- Network: ABC
- Release: September 23 – September 30, 2010

My Generation is an American mockumentary comedy drama television series that aired on the ABC network in the fall of 2010. The one-hour comedy drama, produced by ABC Studios, follows a group of high school classmates in Austin, Texas, in 2000, then revisits them ten years after graduation. The series premiered on September 23, 2010, and was canceled by ABC on October 1 due to the first two episodes' poor ratings.

== Premise ==
The series follows a group of nine adults whose lives were being filmed for a documentary just before their graduation from fictional Greenbelt High School in Austin, Texas, in 2000. The group includes the Overachiever, the Beauty Queen, the Nerd, the Punk, the Jock, the Brain, the Rich Kid, the Rock Star, and the Wallflower. Their hopes and dreams for the future were recorded, and as they meet up ten years later, they find that things do not always go as planned. Several of the characters' lives after high school are affected by or tied to real-world events such as the September 11 attacks, the Enron scandal, and the War in Afghanistan. The series is set in the present with flashbacks to the past.

== Development and production ==
My Generation is based on the Swedish series God's Highway (Blomstertid). The pilot script, originally titled Generation Y, was written by Noah Hawley. ABC gave a production order for the pilot in January 2010.

In early February, Keir O'Donnell and Michael Stahl-David became the first actors cast in the pilot. Julian Morris, Daniella Alonso, and Kelli Garner then joined the ensemble cast in late February, followed by Anne Son. Jaime King and Mehcad Brooks came on board in early March, followed quickly by Sebastian Sozzi, who booked the final principal role a few days later.

Filming began in mid-March. Craig Gillespie directed the pilot. In May 2010, ABC announced it had added the series to the 2010–11 schedule with a fall 2010 premiere planned.

Amid low ratings, ABC canceled the show on October 1 after airing only two episodes. In early November, ABC made the remaining 6 unaired episodes available online.

== Cast and characters ==
- Michael Stahl-David as Steven Foster, "The Overachiever". He was the class valedictorian and as such great things were said and predicted about him. Steven was best friends with Kenneth in high school, and after high school went on to attend Yale University. His father was a high-ranking executive at Enron who was sent to prison as a result of the Enron scandal. The scandal also resulted in his family assets being frozen, and as a result Steven was forced to drop out of Yale. He subsequently moved to Hawaii to work as a bartender. He is now viewed as somewhat of a slacker compared to the thriving high school student that he was. On prom night he slept with Caroline Chung, getting her pregnant unbeknownst to him at the time.
- Daniella Alonso as Brenda Serrano, "The Brain". In high school, Brenda wanted to be a scientist and was in love with Anders. After the controversial 2000 presidential election, she became a pre-law student and moved to Washington, D.C., to work as a congressional staffer. She and Anders also broke up sometime after high school, which neither Brenda nor Anders has fully gotten over.
- Mehcad Brooks as Rolly Marks, "The Jock". He is now married to Dawn and enlisted in the United States Army the week after the September 11 attacks. He is on deployment in Afghanistan.
- Kelli Garner as Dawn Barbuso, "The Punk". She was so-called because of her juvenile delinquent attitude in high school; her lack of parents often translated into bad behavior. Dawn briefly dated Kenneth, but broke up with him after high school. She eventually married Rolly and is six months pregnant with their baby when the series starts. She is also living with Kenneth while Rolly is deployed in Afghanistan, a fact that Rolly objects to but agrees to for his wife's sake.
- Jaime King as Jacqueline "Jackie" Vachs, "The Beauty Queen". Jackie planned on being an actress and was in one season of The Bachelor; however, she refuses to talk about what became of her acting career. She is married to Anders, but their relationship comes off as awkward and forced.
- Julian Morris as Anders Holt, "The Rich Kid". In high school, he was best friends with Rolly and was in love with Brenda. Although he married Jackie, he has clearly not gotten over Brenda, a fact that looms over their marriage.
- Keir O'Donnell as Kenneth Finley, "The Nerd". Kenneth dated Dawn in high school and was best friends with Steven. Kenneth's father committed suicide after Enron's collapse "wiped him out"; Kenneth blames Steven for his father's suicide due to Steven's father's involvement in the scandal. Kenneth is living with his ex-girlfriend Dawn while her husband is in Afghanistan, and works as a fourth-grade teacher.
- Sebastian Sozzi as The Falcon, "The Rock Star". He ended up producing recording artists and is friends with Steven Foster. He is considered a neutral figure as he is not significantly involved with anyone else in the group.
- Anne Son as Caroline Chung, "The Wallflower". Caroline was highly introverted in high school. She had a one-night stand with Steven Foster on prom night and became pregnant as a result. She waited nearly 10 years before revealing the existence of their son, Tom, to Steven. Tom's fourth-grade teacher is none other than Kenneth (who is unaware of Steven being Tom's father). Through Kenneth, Caroline became good friends with Dawn and Falcon. After high school, Caroline became more confident and assertive.

== Episodes ==
No.	Title	Directed by	Written by	U.S. viewers (millions)	Original release date
1	"Pilot"	Craig Gillespie	Noah Hawley	5.22	September 23, 2010
A documentary filmmaker who filmed a group of nine teenagers shortly before their high school graduation finds out what happened to them ten years later. Steven is living in Hawaii working as a bartender when Caroline calls to tell him their one-night stand on prom night resulted in her having a now-9-year-old son. Brenda is living in Washington, D.C., and catches up with Falcon, who tells her her high school sweetheart Anders is now married to Jackie. Kenneth now works as a fourth-grade teacher, but his longtime dream of having children is dashed when he finds out he is infertile. Dawn is now married to Rolly; Rolly is deployed in Afghanistan, and Dawn lives with Kenneth.
2	"Home Movies"	Michael Katleman	Noah Hawley	3.94	September 30, 2010
Steven agrees to meet his son for the first time. Brenda returns to Austin due to her mother's stroke and has an awkward meeting with Jackie. Rolly is wounded in Afghanistan but hides it from Dawn. Kenneth convinces Dawn to take a birth preparation class, but she immediately feels uncomfortable around the other couples. The filmmaker explores Steven's past, particularly his strained relationship with his father, and learns for the first time that Steven has an older brother who was thought to have run away at age fifteen, days before he was meant to go off to college, because of the pressure he was feeling from his father. The filmmaker also explores Dawn's past, particularly her relationship with her parents and brother, revealing that when Dawn was seventeen her mother abandoned her and her younger brother Vincent leaving them on their own. To support her brother Dawn dropped out of school and began looking for jobs to save money so her brother could go to college.
3	"Truth and Reconciliation"	Dean White	Bob DeLaurentis	N/A	N/A
The filmmaker explores the breakup of Brenda and Anders – "Branders" – in 2000. Steven travels to New York City to talk with an English teacher from high school, Mr. Balcone, and stays at Falcon's apartment during the visit. When Falcon is slapped in the face at a cafe by a beautiful woman, we find out that she is his wife, whom he met during the New York blackout of 2003, and that she has filed for divorce. Rolly has one of his soldiers explain Rolly's theory of Kenneth's designs on Dawn, and convinces Dawn to look at a house Rolly's mother has agreed to make the down payment for as a gift to the couple. The filmmaker reveals to Brenda that Anders had bought an engagement ring before graduation in 2000. When Brenda confronts Anders, he explains that his father threatened to slander her father if Anders continued the relationship.
4	"Birth/Rebirth"	Seith Mann	Andi Bushell	N/A	N/A
5	"The Bed In"	Jamie Babbit	Salvatore Stabile	N/A	N/A
6	"On the Road"	Stephen Kay	Jon Cowan	N/A	N/A
7	"Homecoming"	Daniel Attias	Adam Stein	N/A	N/A
8	"What Comes Next"	Tucker Gates	Liz Phang	N/A	N/A
