= XX/XY =

- DVD cover
- Directed by: Austin Chick
- Written by: Austin Chick
- Produced by: Mitchell Robbins; Isen Robbins; Aimee Schoof
- Starring: Mark Ruffalo; Kathleen Robertson; Maya Stange
- Cinematography: Uta Briesewitz
- Edited by: William A. Anderson; Pete Beaudreau
- Music by: The Insects
- Production company: Natural Nylon
- Distributed by: IFC Films; MGM Home Entertainment
- Release dates: January 11, 2002 (Sundance); April 11, 2003 (United States)
- Running time: 91 minutes
- Country: United States
- Language: English
- Box office: $104,131

XX/XY is a 2002 American romantic drama film written and directed by Austin Chick and starring Mark Ruffalo, Kathleen Robertson, and Maya Stange. The title refers to the different chromosome pairings present in males and females. XX/XY premiered in competition at the 2002 Sundance Film Festival. Although the funding for the film came from the US, the film was produced by British company Natural Nylon.

== Plot ==
In 1992, college students Sam and Thea meet artist Coles at a party, and their mutual attraction leads to a passionate and awkward night together. They form an unstable friendship, and continue to push their sexual boundaries. Soon, their friendships are tested by Sam and Coles' romance and Thea's increasingly reckless behavior. Inevitably, their relationships dissolve due to fear, resentment and mistrust on all sides.

Ten years later, they reunite. Coles, now a failed filmmaker who works at a high-profile ad agency, lives with Claire, his girlfriend of five years. Thea, the former wild-child, is happily married to Miles, with whom she shares ownership of a very successful and flourishing restaurant. Sam has returned to Manhattan from London after breaking off her engagement. Upon reconnecting, the three are drawn back into their old and complicated dynamic. They are soon forced to confront the true meaning of commitment and love, something they avoided as young adults.

== Cast ==
- Mark Ruffalo as Coles
- Kathleen Robertson as Thea
- Maya Stange as Sam
- Kel O'Neill as Sid
- Paula Roth as Mom
- Lee Cobb as Stepfather
- Joey Kern as Tommy
- Petra Wright as Claire
- David Thornton as Miles

== Reception ==
XX/XY holds a 42% rating on Rotten Tomatoes based on 64 reviews, with an average rating of 5.6/10. The site’s critics consensus reads, "The characters are both unsympathetic and uninteresting."

Though critics were mixed on the likability of the characters and the chemistry between the leads, multiple reviews praised Ruffalo’s performance, with Roger Ebert of the Chicago Sun-Times saying he plays Coles "with an elusive charm" and Sean Axmaker of the Seattle Post-Intelligencer noting Ruffalo brings the quality of his breakout performance in You Can Count on Me to the role. Stephen Holden of The New York Times wrote, "It's a measure of the actor's tousled charm that Mr. Ruffalo can make you empathize for even two seconds with the seething inner life of this whiny narcissist who chucks his fledgling career in film to settle for a cushy job creating an ad campaign that features wiggling bikini-clad tacos."

Moira Macdonald of The Seattle Times said while the film starts off roughly in the college years, it improves as it goes along and jumps years ahead. Petra Wright also received positive critical attention, with Ebert commenting "it is Wright who does the best and most difficult job among the women, finding a painful balance between Claire's self-respect and her desire to hang on to Coles", and Macdonald saying she gives "a speech near the end that's beautifully delivered, yanking XX/XY into the dangerous territory of the heart."

Axmaker added the film "doesn't necessarily offer anything new to the male/female dynamic, but it refuses to let Coles off the hook with an easy epiphany and a painless happily ever after." Ebert concluded his review acknowledging fellow critics‘ impressions of the characters as unsympathetic, and countered that "jerks are often the most interesting characters in the movies, and sometimes the ones most like ourselves. XX/XY would be dismal if the characters all behaved admirably", and "the film has a rare insight into the mechanism by which some men would rather pursue happiness than obtain it."
