= Maya Stange =

Australian actress

Maya Stange is an Australian television and film actress known for starring roles in the films In a Savage Land, Garage Days and XX/XY. She also had recurring roles on the TV series Love Child and A Place to Call Home. She was born in Perth, Western Australia.

In 2022, Stange appeared in the crime drama Underbelly: Vanishing Act.

== Filmography ==
=== Film ===
Year	Title	Role	Notes
1993	Love in Limbo	Ivy Riddle	
1998	Head On	Janet	
1999	In a Savage Land	Evelyn Spence	
2002	XX/XY	Sam	
2002	Garage Days	Kate	
2010	After the Credits	Flight Attendant	Short film
2012	Rabbit	House Wife	Short film
2012	The Oogieloves in the Big Balloon Adventure	Windy Window	
2012	I'm the One	Mia	Short film
2013	Adore	Workshop Performer	
2013	Galore	Carrie	
2013	Heidi Fires Everyone	Justine	Short film
2014	Touch	Anna	Short film
2014	Ash	Beth	Short film
2015	Drown	Woman Who Drowned	
2015	Jack's Promise	Esther	Short film
2015	The Vicar's Wife	Deirdre Lawless	
2015	Body in the Yard	Lea	
2016	Killing Ground	Margaret Voss	
2016	Talkers	Kelly	Short
2016	Trespass	Rachel	Short
2017	Seek	Mia	Short
2018	Two Bites	Susan	Short
2018	Trigger Happy	Betty	Short
2018	Book Week	Trish	
2018	A Suburban Love Story	Lea	
2020	Strange Nostalgia	Storyteller	
2023	Hostile Forces	Sophie	

=== Television ===
Year	Title	Role	Notes	Ref
1994	Baby Bath Massacre	Rose	TV film	
1995	Halifax f.p.	Lisa Onslow	"Words Without Music"	
1995	Blue Heelers	Kerry Mitchell	"Gun Crazy"	
1995	Flipper	Devra	"Treasure Hunt"	
1996	McLeod's Daughters	Becky Howard	TV film	
1998	All Saints	Emily Watson	"Give and Take"	
1998	Good Guys, Bad Guys	Orange	"Zen Go the Strings of My Heart"	
1999	Secret Men's Business	Emma	TV film	
2000	Casualty	Katie	"Being There: Parts 1 & 2"	
2002	Young Lions	Sophia Rinaldi	Recurring role	
2006	Filthy Gorgeous	Shannon	TV film	
2007	Burn Notice	Gillian Walsh	"Loose Ends: Part 1"	
2010	Satisfaction	Lucy Gallagher	"Not Vanilla"	
2010	Wicked Love: The Maria Korp Story	Tania Herman	TV film	
2012	The Great Mint Swindle	Sheryl Mickelberg	TV film	
2012	Tricky Business	Frankie Chalmers	"Secrets and Lies", "Who Wants to Be an Albatross"	
2012	Rake	Charlotte Gardyne	"R vs Woodridge & Anor"	
2013	Redfern Now	Susie	"Dogs of War"	
2014-2015	Love Child	Eva McNaughton	Recurring role	
2016	Wolf Creek	Ingrid Thorogood	"Billabong"	
2017	The Secret Daughter	Wendy Chappie	Recurring role	
2018	A Place to Call Home	Delia Craig	Recurring role	
2022	Underbelly: Vanishing Act	Angie Beyersdorf	2 episodes	
2023	The Messenger	Julie Singer	7 episodes	
2024	Total Control	Kathleen Sloane	Series 3: 3 episodes	
2024	We Were Tomorrow	Rebekah Reeves	2 episodes	
2025	Ten Pound Poms	Maggie Skinner	6 episodes	
