= Austin Chick =

American film director, screenwriter and film producer

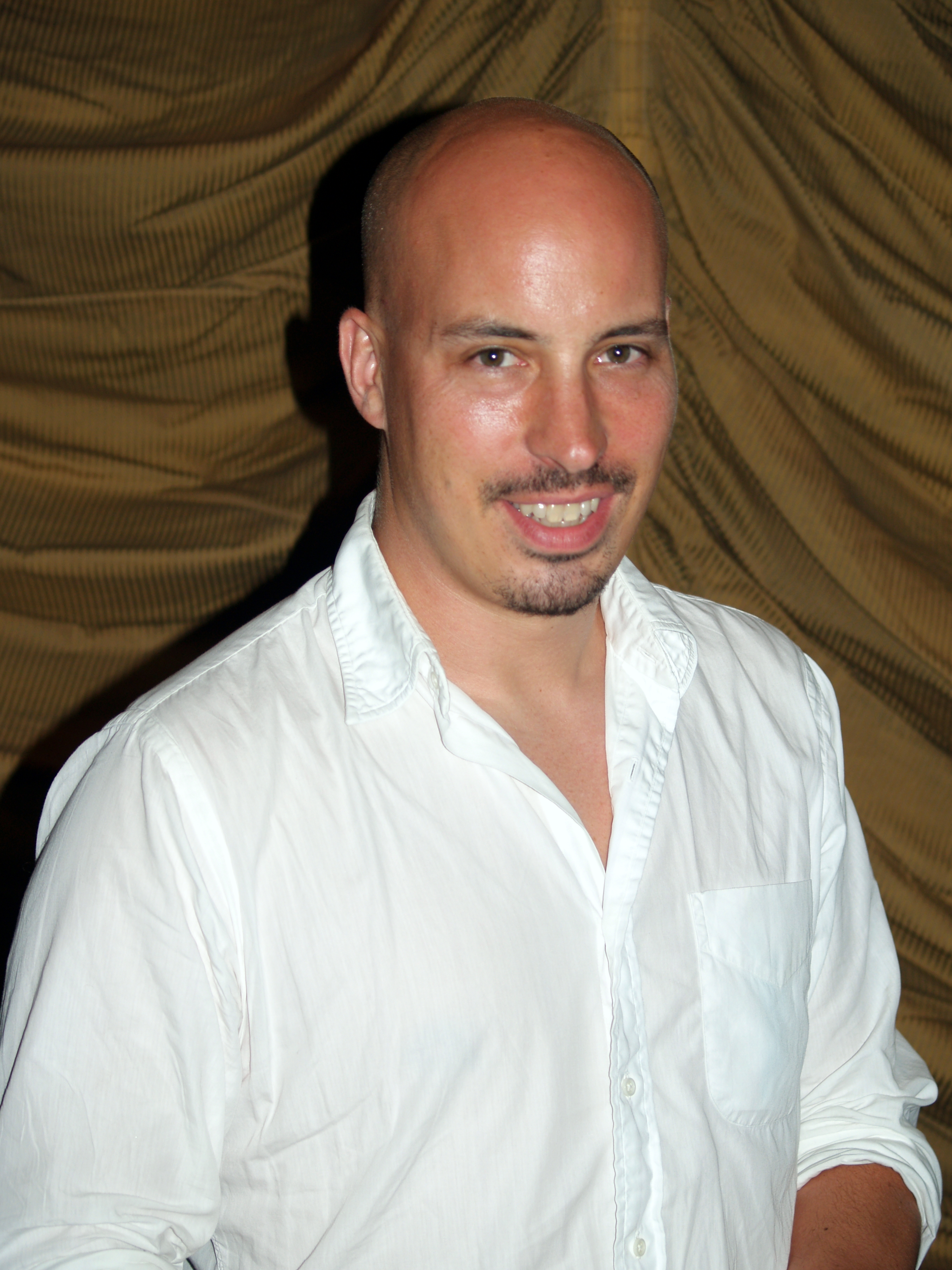
- Chick in 2008
- Born: 1971 (age 54–55); Hartford, Connecticut, U.S.
- Education: State University of New York at Purchase
- Occupations: Film director, screenwriter, film producer
- Known for: XX/XY (2002); August (2008)
- Spouse: Morena Baccarin (m. 2011; div. 2016)
- Children: 1

Austin Chick (born 1971) is an American film director, screenwriter, and producer, who made the film XX/XY, released in 2002, and August, which premiered at the 2008 Sundance Film Festival.

== Early life ==
Although born in Hartford, Connecticut, Chick moved to New Hampshire as a youngster. In the late 1980s he attended high school at High Mowing School, a boarding school in Wilton, NH. He went on to Sarah Lawrence College in Yonkers, where he specialized in literature and psychology with the aid of grants from the King Foundation. Chick spent a number of years unsure of what he wanted to do with his life and took on a life of a wanderer for some time. He said watching Kings of the Road helped him find direction:.

I wanted to be doing something that was a little bit more, I don’t know, populist? More accessible. I felt like a narrative interested me, and it wasn’t until I saw Kings of the Road that I realized that film was a place that might make sense for me.

In 1998, Chick graduated in cinematography from SUNY Purchase Film School in Purchase, New York.

== Career ==
His first major film, which he wrote and directed, was released in 2002. It was titled XX/XY, and it starred Mark Ruffalo and Kathleen Robertson. It examined the complex relationship between three Sarah Lawrence College students, both during their time at the school and then many years later. It was an independent production, which was shown at the 2002 Sundance Film Festival (where it was nominated for the Grand Jury Prize) and subsequently taken up by IFC Films.

He co-produced Sidney Lumet's 2007 film Before the Devil Knows You're Dead, which featured Ethan Hawke and Philip Seymour Hoffman as two brothers who stage the robbery of their parents' jewelry shop in an effort to get rich quick, with tragic consequences.

He then produced a movie called August, which was released by ContentFilm International in 2008. The cast list is headed by Josh Hartnett, and features Adam Scott, Naomie Harris, Rip Torn, and David Bowie. The plot centered on two brothers, with one of them, Tom (Hartnett), involved in a struggle to save his internet company on the stock market just before the 9/11 terrorist attacks. Chick directed the film and was also executive producer.

In 2012, he wrote and directed Girls Against Boys (starring Danielle Panabaker and Nicole LaLiberte). It was released by Anchor Bay Entertainment in 2012.

== Personal life ==
Chick married actress Morena Baccarin over Thanksgiving in 2011. They had a son. Chick filed for divorce in July 2015, citing irreconcilable differences. In September 2015, his wife responded in a legal declaration involving their divorce that she planned to marry her Gotham co-star, Ben McKenzie, adding that she was pregnant with McKenzie's child. On 18 March 2016, Baccarin and Chick's divorce became official. Baccarin agreed to a stipend for Chick of $5,000 per month in spousal support through December 2018, and $3,500 per month in child support for their son until he reaches 18 years of age.
