= Neroli Meadows =

Australian sports journalist

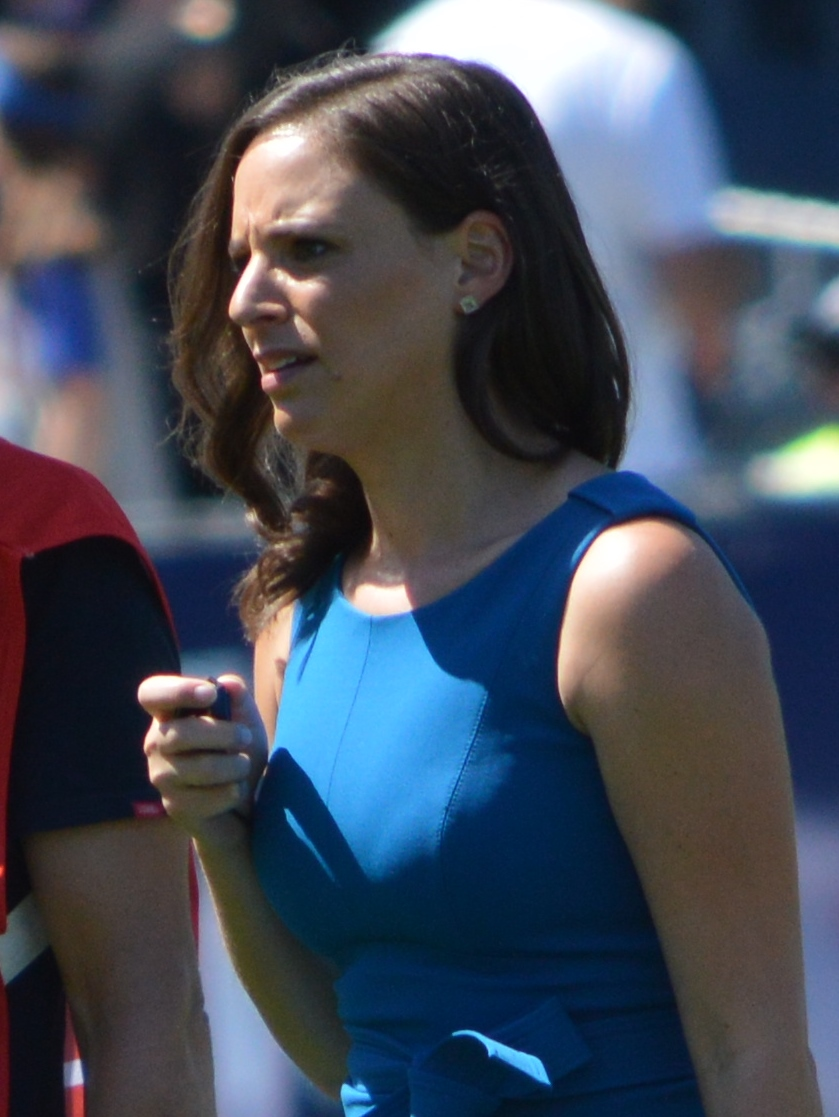
- Meadows working for Fox Footy in March 2017
- Born: Neroli Meadows; 1985 or 1986 (age 40–41); Collie, Western Australia, Australia
- Other name: Nez
- Education: West Australian Academy of Performing Arts
- Occupations: Television presenter; sports journalist; sports commentator
- Years active: 2006−present
- Relatives: Ian Meadows (brother)

Neroli Meadows is an Australian television presenter, sports journalist and sports commentator. Meadows has been a boundary rider for Triple M's Australian Football League (AFL) coverage and was a presenter and commentator across the Fox Sports network for nine years, covering Australian rules football, cricket and basketball. She also co-hosted the short-lived revamp of the Nine Network program The Footy Show in 2019.

== Early life and education ==
Meadows was born and raised in Collie, Western Australia, and supports the Fremantle Football Club in the Australian Football League (AFL). She has two older brothers: Ross, who played hockey for Australia, and Ian, an actor best known for his role on Home and Away. Meadows studied journalism at Curtin University and completed a diploma in broadcasting at the West Australian Academy of Performing Arts. She also studied in the United States at the University of Tennessee on a student exchange program.

== Career ==
Meadows began her career as the weekend sports producer at Perth radio station 6PR in 2006 before spending four years at the Seven Network as a sports reporter on Today Tonight. She was a panel member on the Network Ten program Before the Game, alongside Andrew Maher, Mick Molloy, Dave Hughes and Anthony Lehmann, in the program's final year in 2013, and has also appeared on the association football-themed comedy show Santo, Sam and Ed's Total Football and the game show Have You Been Paying Attention?.

In January 2016, Meadows recorded an interview on the ABC program 7.30 regarding inappropriate comments made by Jamaican cricketer Chris Gayle towards her and fellow sports reporter Mel McLaughlin (who worked for Network Ten at the time). In March 2017, Meadows spoke out against Herald Sun chief football writer and fellow Fox Footy presenter Mark Robinson about an article he wrote describing Adelaide premiership co-captain Erin Phillips kissing her wife at that year's AFL Women's awards ceremony as "a touch sensual for a number of men".

In 2017, she joined Fox Footy's inaugural AFL Women's commentary team, and also joined Triple M for its coverages of AFL and cricket, as well as Fox Sports for its National Basketball League (NBL) coverage for the 2017–18 NBL season. Meadows hosted the Fox Sports program Game Day Live, where she spoke to Australian sportspeople from a variety of sports, and the Fox Footy program AFL Tonight, where she spoke to players and other personalities involved in the AFL. In 2018, she also began co-hosting the Fox Footy program On the Mark, alongside Sarah Jones and Kelli Underwood.

In February 2019, the Herald Sun reported that Meadows was in talks with the Nine Network to become the female co-host of the revamped AFL Footy Show, which she would juggle with her usual Fox Footy commitments. She was confirmed as co-host in March 2019, reuniting with Anthony Lehmann from their work on Before the Game. However, the show was cancelled just seven episodes into the new season following weeks of poor ratings. In October 2019, Fox Sports parted ways with Meadows due to alleged cost-cutting, which came as a surprise to media and fans alike; Foxtel boss Patrick Delany defended the decision by saying, "We have plenty of women on the network and from time to time people go [...] people don’t have jobs for life".

In January 2020, Meadows rejoined the Nine Network for its coverage of the 2020 Brisbane International and 2020 Australian Open as a court announcer and post-match interviewer. Later that month, she joined ESPN Australia for its coverage of the Super Bowl LIV in Miami.
