= Jessica M. Thompson =

Film and television writer, director, editor, and producer

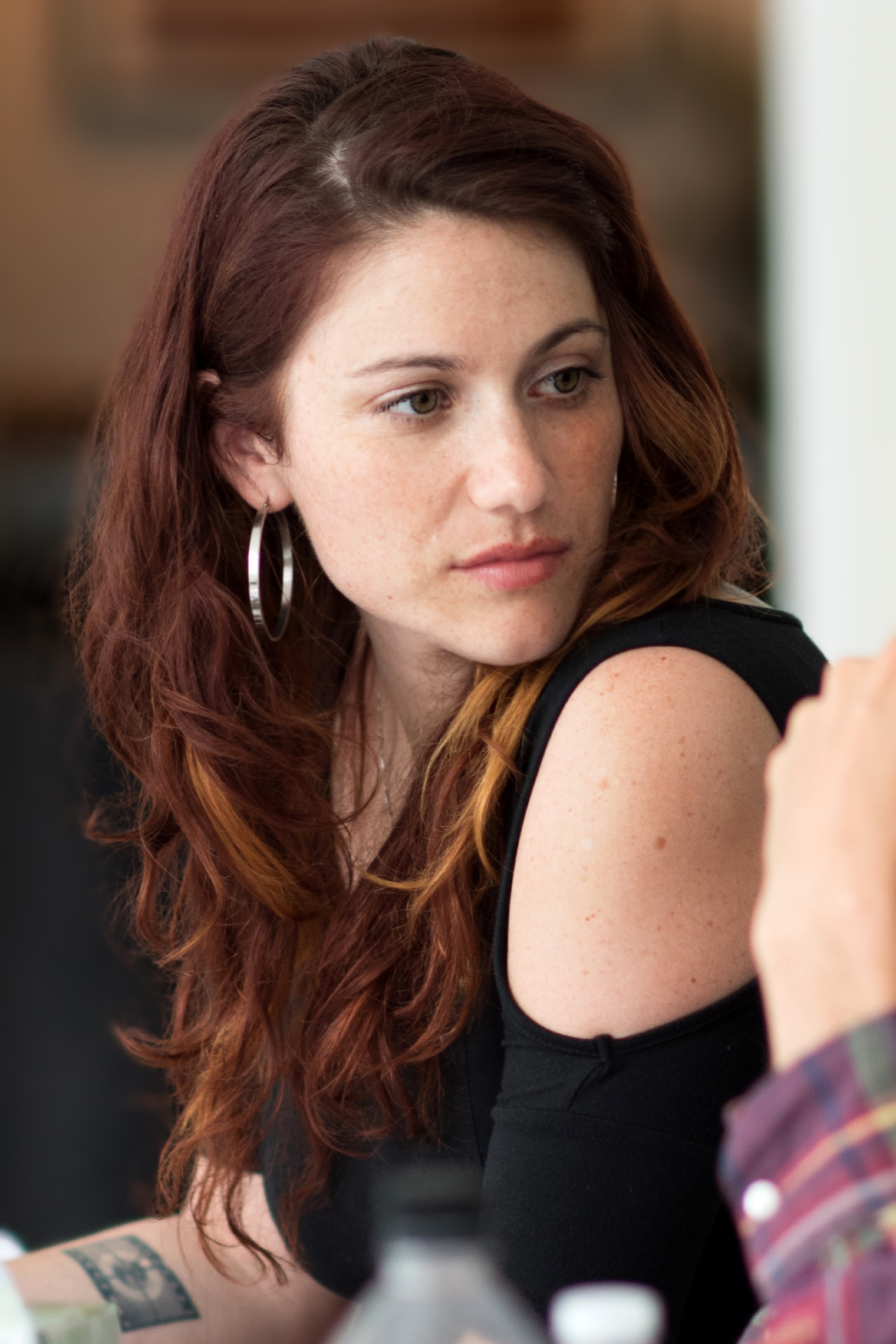

Jessica M. Thompson is an Australian film and television writer, director, editor, and producer. She lives in Los Angeles.

== Early life and education ==
Thompson grew up in the Western Suburbs of Sydney, Australia and is of partial Maltese heritage. Thompson studied at the Sydney Theatre Company and University of Technology Sydney, where she received a B.A. in Media Arts and Production.

== Career ==
Thompson worked as a film editor in Sydney, before moving to New York City in 2010, where she founded Stedfast Productions. She edited Cheryl Furjanic's documentary, Back on Board, which premiered on HBO in August 2015 and was nominated for an Emmy Award in 2016. Thompson has also worked as a film editor with filmmakers Liz Garbus and Edet Belzberg.

Thompson made her feature writing and directorial debut with The Light of the Moon (2017), starring Stephanie Beatriz, Michael Stahl-David, and Conrad Ricamora. It had its premiere at the South by Southwest (SXSW) film festival in March 2017, where it won the Audience Award for Best Narrative Feature Film. Critics called the film "harrowingly effective" (Variety), "honest and complex" (The Hollywood Reporter), and Film Inquiry stated that, "For any filmmaker this would be an unmitigated triumph, but for a first time filmmaker this is revelatory." The Light of the Moon had a limited North American theatrical release in November–December 2017. The film has a 97% score on review-aggregator Rotten Tomatoes.

Thompson was the lead director on Showtime's ten-part television series The End (2020), starring Harriet Walter and Frances O'Connor, produced by the academy-Award-winning, See-Saw Films.

In 2022, Thompson directed her second feature film, The Invitation, a Sony Pictures horror-thriller starring Nathalie Emmanuel, and written by Blair Butler. It was released in cinemas worldwide on 26 August 2022 and was the top-grossing film at the box office that weekend. The film debuted at #2 on the Netflix charts on 24 December 2022 with over 664 million minutes viewed on the platform in one week.

Thompson is currently attached to direct a film about Ernest Hemingway's final years, entitled The Hemingway Files.

== Personal life ==
In 2010, Thompson moved from Sydney, Australia to Brooklyn, New York. She lived in the Williamsburg neighborhood for more than eight years before moving to Los Angeles, California.

== Filmography ==
Short film

| Year | Title | Director | Writer | Producer | Editor | Notes |
|---|---|---|---|---|---|---|
| 2008 | Hike | Yes | Yes | Yes | Yes | |
| 2008 | Percepio | Yes | Yes | No | No | |
| 2012 | Three | Yes | Yes | Yes | Yes | |
| 2013 | Across the Pond | Yes | Yes | Yes | Yes | |

Feature film

| Year | Title | Director | Writer | Producer | Editor | Notes |
|---|---|---|---|---|---|---|
| 2017 | The Light of the Moon | Yes | Yes | Yes | Yes | Role: Waitress |
| 2022 | The Invitation | Yes | No | No | No | |

Television

| Year | Title | Notes |
|---|---|---|
| 2020 | The End | 6 episodes |

Other credits

| Year | Title | Role | Notes |
|---|---|---|---|
| 2012 | 419 | Associate Producer | |
| 2012 | Love, Marilyn | Associate editor and production manager | Documentary film |
| 2013 | The Abominable Crime | Additional editor | Documentary film |
| 2014 | Watchers of the Sky | Additional editor | Documentary film |
| 2014 | Back on Board: Greg Louganis | Editor | Documentary film |
