= August (2008 film) =

- Theatrical release poster
- Directed by: Austin Chick
- Written by: Howard A. Rodman
- Produced by: Josh Hartnett; David Guy Levy; Charlie Corwin; Clara Markowicz; Elisa Pugliese
- Starring: Josh Hartnett; Naomie Harris; David Bowie; Rip Torn; Adam Scott; Emmanuelle Chriqui
- Cinematography: Andrij Parekh
- Edited by: Pete Beaudreau
- Music by: Nathan Larson
- Production companies: Original Media; Periscope Entertainment
- Distributed by: First Look Studios
- Release dates: January 22, 2008 (Sundance); July 11, 2008 (United States)
- Running time: 88 minutes
- Country: United States
- Language: English
- Budget: $3.4 million
- Box office: $12,636

August is a 2008 American drama film directed by Austin Chick and presented by 57th & Irving. The screenplay by Howard A. Rodman focuses on two brothers, ambitious dot-com entrepreneurs attempting to keep their company afloat as the stock market begins to collapse in August 2001, one month prior to the 9/11 attacks.

The film premiered as an official selection of the Spectrum section at the 2008 Sundance Film Festival. The film did not do well with critics and received negative reviews..

== Plot summary ==
Tom and Joshua Sterling are brothers whose Internet startup company, Landshark, had been proving to be lucrative, all until the summer of 2001. The story then moves to August 2001. At this time, everything has seemed to go to the opposite side of the spectrum, their company is locked up, its usually profitable stock price is plummeting from what was once high numbers.

In the meantime, the film familiarizes the viewers with its main characters, brothers Tom and Joshua Sterling. The focal point being the self indulgent, showmen of the two. Tom Sterling seems to be proficient in all aspects of his life and enjoys driving his 67 Camaro (convertible) and utilizing his title of an internet star to date multiple women, while spending much of his time at a new club called Bungalow 8.

- Josh Hartnett as Tom Sterling
- Naomie Harris as Sarah
- Adam Scott as Joshua Sterling
- Robin Tunney as Melanie Hanson
- Andre Royo as Dylan Gottschalk
- Emmanuelle Chriqui as Morella Sterling
- Laila Robins as Ottmar Peevo
- Caroline Lagerfelt as Nancy Sterling
- Alan Cox as Burton
- John Lavelle as Brad
- David Bowie as Cyrus Ogilvie
- Rip Torn as David Sterling
- Mozhan Marnò as Ashley

== Festival screenings ==
Festival	Section	Screening Dates
Sundance Film Festival	Spectrum	January 22, 2008; January 23, 2008; January 24, 2008; January 26, 2008
Seattle International Film Festival	Contemporary World Cinema	May 29, 2008; June 2, 2008
Brooklyn International Film Festival	Narrative Feature Films	May 31, 2008; June 6, 2008
Karlovy Vary International Film Festival	Horizons	July 7, 2008
Oldenburg International Film Festival	International Section	September 11, 2008
Flanders International Film Festival Ghent	World Cinema	October 10, 2008
Bahamas International Film Festival	Spirit Of Freedom: Dramatic	December 8, 2008

== Critical reception ==
Rotten Tomatoes gives the film 36% based on 25 reviews, with a consensus that "Josh Hartnett puts in a well-intentioned performance but overall, August only superficially explores its dotcom-burst setting." Metacritic reported the film had an average score of 39 out of 100 based on 10 reviews, indicating "generally unfavorable" reviews.
