= Caroline Lagerfelt =

American actress (born 1947)

- Born: Caroline Eugenie Lagerfelt; September 23, 1947 (age 79); Paris, France
- Other name: Carolyn Lagerfelt
- Occupation: Actress
- Years active: 1971–present
- Children: 2
- Father: Karl-Gustav Lagerfelt

Caroline Eugenie Lagerfelt (born September 23, 1947) is a Swedish/British actress, long based in the United States, recognized for her roles on Sweet Magnolias, Gossip Girl, Six Degrees, Dirty Sexy Money, Nash Bridges and Beverly Hills, 90210.

== Early life ==
Lagerfelt was born to Swedish diplomat and ambassador Baron Karl-Gustav Lagerfelt and Sara Champion de Crespigny, daughter of British major Vierville Champion de Crespigny and Nora (née McSloy). She grew up in Japan, Austria, Switzerland, Luxembourg, Belgium and Sweden, and attended boarding school in England. She immigrated to the United States and attended the American Academy of Dramatic Arts.

== Career ==
Lagerfelt has appeared on Broadway in Betrayal directed by Sir Peter Hall, Lend Me a Tenor directed by Jerry Zaks (Outer Critics Circle Award), A Small Family Business directed by Lynne Meadow, The Real Thing directed by Mike Nichols, Otherwise Engaged directed by Harold Pinter, The Constant Wife with Ingrid Bergman directed by John Gielgud (Drama Desk nomination), The Philanthropist, The Jockey Club Stakes directed by Cyril Ritchard, and Four on a Garden directed by Abe Burrows.

She has appeared extensively Off-Broadway in Notes on My Mother's Decline, Nathan the Wise, King Liz, Indian Ink, The Prime of Miss Jean Brodie, Guantanamo: Honor Bound to Defend Freedom, Moonlight, Hamlet, Phaedra Brittanica, The Creditors, Close of Play, Other Places, Cloud Nine, Quartermaine's Terms directed by Harold Pinter, receiving an Obie Award for her work.

Regional and international credits include Marina Abramovic: An Artist's Life Manifesto, Elektra, Greta Garbo Came to Donegal, The Injured Party, Mary Stuart, The Misanthrope, The Physicists, The Resistible Rise of Arturo Ui, Les Liaisons Dangereuses, A Midsummer Night's Dream and To Grandmother's House We Go with Eva Le Galliene.

== Personal life ==
She has two sons and resides in Santa Monica and New York.

== Filmography ==
=== Film ===
Caroline Lagerfelt film credits
Year	Title	Role	Notes
1986	Iron Eagle	Elizabeth Masters	
1995	Bye Bye Love	Mother #1 at McDonald's	
1995	No Way Back	FBI Agent in Charge Emily Fukes	
1995	Father of the Bride Part II	Check-in nurse	
1997	Glam	Joleen Lemon	
2002	Minority Report	Greta van Eyck	
2005	Homecoming	Mrs. Carter	
2006	Poseidon	Mary	
2006	All the King's Men	Mrs. Peyton	
2008	August	Nancy Sterling	
2011	Royal Reunion	Elaine	Short film
2011	Rolling on the Floor Laughing	Caroline	Short film
2011	Sunday Dinner	Suzy Goodman	Short film
2012	Girls Against Boys	Professor Sara Randolph	
2013	To an Extent	Mom	Short film
2013	The Red Robin	Lillian	
2013	March from Innocence	Katherine	Short film
2014	The Homesman	Netti Svendsen	
2014	Mostly Ghostly: Have You Met My Ghoulfriend?	Emma	Direct to video
2015	I'll See You in My Dreams	Leslie	
2018	Wake.	Ivy Rose	
2024	Mothers' Instinct	Jean	

=== Television ===
Caroline Lagerfelt television credits
Year	Title	Role	Notes
1979	Archie Bunker's Place	Ruth Kendall	Episode: "The Shabbat Dinner"
1983	The Edge of Night	Patricia Devereaux	Unknown episodes
1985	T. J. Hooker	Julia	Episode: "The Throwaway"
1986	As the World Turns	Elaine Hargrove	Unknown episodes
1986	The Twilight Zone	April Hamilton	Episode: "The Misfortune Cookie"
1986	Cagney & Lacey	Rita Quintero	Episode: "DWI"
1988–89	One Life to Live	Carrie Gordon	Unknown episodes
1988	Spenser: For Hire	Governess	Episode: "Haunting"
1988	Home at Last	Christina	TV movie
1988	The Equalizer	Evelyn	Episode: "Eighteen with a Bullet"
1990	Murphy Brown	Mary Ann Miller	Episode: "But First a Word from Our Sponsor"
1993	Ghostwriter	Sally Lewis	5 episodes
1993	TriBeCa	Irene Woodward	Episode: "The Loft"
1993	Law & Order	Danielle Keyes	Episode: "Black Tie"
1994	NYPD Blue	Kitty Lear	Episode: "Good Time Charlie"
1994	Star Trek: Deep Space Nine	Makbar	Episode: "Tribunal"
1994	ER	Andrea	Episode: "ER Confidential"
1995–96	Beverly Hills, 90210	Sheila Silver	5 episodes
1995	Amazing Grace	Mrs. Spangler	Episode: "The Shooting"
1995	Chicago Hope	Nurse Holder	Episode: "The Virus"
1995	Central Park West	Rhinebeck Retreat receptionist	Episode: "Showgirls"
1996	The Drew Carey Show	Mrs. Hoyt	Episode: "Atomic Cat Fight"
1996	Picket Fences	Marta Beiler	Episode: "To Forgive Is Devine"
1996–2001	Nash Bridges	Inger Dominguez	29 episodes
1997	Pensacola: Wings of Gold	Rae	Episode: "Bogey Man"
1997	Journey of the Heart	Lady of the house	TV movie
1998	The Lake	Mayor Louise Terry	TV movie
1999	Chicken Soup for the Soul	Mother	Episode: "Egg Lessons"
1999	Snoops	Marcia Zindler	Episode: "The Grinch"
2000	Missing Pieces	Serena	TV movie
2001	The X-Files	Rustic woman	Episode: "The Gift"
2002	Maybe It's Me	Corinne	Episode: "The Fever Episode"
2002	First Monday	—N/a	Episode: "Right to Die"
2002	Red Skies	Veronica Peirson	TV movie
2003	Six Feet Under	Alternate wife	Episode: "Perfect Circles"
2003	Buffy the Vampire Slayer	Anne	Episode: "Lies My Parents Told Me"
2003	Frasier	Glinka	Episode: "The Doctor Is Out"
2004	Law & Order: Criminal Intent	Hannah Heltman	Episode: "The Posthumous Collection"
2005	Mrs. Harris	Madeira School administrator	TV movie
2006	How I Met Your Mother	Bridal shop lady	Episode: "Cupcake"
2006–07	Six Degrees	J.T.	4 episodes
2007	All My Children	Dr. Massey	Season 38, episode 45
2007	Murder 101: If Wishes Were Horses	Mary Bergin	TV movie
2007	House	Connie	Episode: "Guardian Angels"
2007–12	Gossip Girl	Celia "CeCe" Rhodes	10 episodes
2008	Dirty Sexy Money	Clare George	Episode: "The Star Witness"
2009	Numbers	Rose Harris	Episode: "Shadow Markets"
2009	Brothers & Sisters	Jane	Episode: "The Wine Festival"
2010	Weeds	Cannabis Network lady	Episode: "A Yippity Sippity"
2012	Castle	Anjelica Henley	Episode: "Secret's Safe with Me"
2012	CSI: Crime Scene Investigation	Marjorie Randell	Episode: "Play Dead"
2013	Masters of Sex	Barb	Episode: "Brave New World"
2014	The Mindy Project	Gladys Dunne	Episode: "Girl Crush"
2015	Gotham	Mrs. Kean	2 episodes
2016	NCIS	Victoria Mallard	Episode: "The Tie That Binds"
2018	The Blacklist	Vera	2 episodes
2020	The Bold Type		Episode: "To Peg or Not to Peg"
2020–present	Sweet Magnolias	Paula Vreeland	Recurring
2021	Law & Order: Organized Crime	Agniezjka "Agnes" Bogdani	Season 2
2023	Hunters	Gertrude Zuchs	Episode: "Blutsbande"
2026	CIA	Anne Harrison	Episode: "Forbidden Eye"
