= The Light of the Moon =

- Theatrical release poster
- Directed by: Jessica M. Thompson
- Written by: Jessica M. Thompson
- Produced by: Jessica M. Thompson; Carlo Velayo; Michael Cuomo
- Starring: Stephanie Beatriz; Michael Stahl-David
- Cinematography: Autumn Eakin
- Edited by: Jessica M. Thompson
- Music by: David Torn
- Production companies: Stedfast Productions; Big Vision Creative
- Distributed by: Imagination Worldwide
- Release dates: March 24, 2017 (SXSW); November 1, 2017 (United States)
- Running time: 90 minutes
- Country: United States
- Language: English

The Light of the Moon is a 2017 American drama film written, directed, and edited by Jessica M. Thompson in her feature directorial debut. Starring Stephanie Beatriz and Michael Stahl-David, the film follows Bonnie (Beatriz), an architect who is raped by a stranger in New York City and covers a six-week period following the assault and deals with the resulting impact on her and the changes in her relationships, particularly with her boyfriend Matt (Stahl-David). Beatriz also served as one of the executive producers of the film.

The Light of the Moon premiered at South by Southwest on March 24, 2017, where it won the Audience Award for Narrative Feature. The Film was theatrically released in the United States on November 1, 2017, to critical acclaim.

== Plot ==
Bonnie (Stephanie Beatriz) is a successful architect living in Bushwick, Brooklyn with her boyfriend Matt (Michael Stahl-David) who works in advertising. He visits her at work to tell her he can't join her or her coworkers for drinks due to a last minute client meeting. Bonnie and her coworkers go out to a bar where she has many drinks as well as a little bit of cocaine. While dancing, a bar patron attempts to make inappropriate advances toward her. At the end of the night, Bonnie decides to walk home alone and puts on her headphones to listen to music. She is subsequently attacked by a stranger in a hoodie and taken into a back alley where he slams her head against the wall and rapes her. He then takes her driver's license and threatens her before running off.

After a moment of shock, she regains enough composure to wipe herself with a tissue and walk home where she puts the tissues and her underwear in a bag and cleans up her head wound. Matt finds her sobbing on the couch and asks her what happened. She says she was mugged and asks to be taken to the hospital. Bonnie returns to work because she's working on a large client, hoping it will help take her mind off of the incident. Her coworkers, having been told she was only mugged, cheer her up by telling her she's a badass, while her boss pushes back her meetings to give her more time to prepare. However, after some time, her boss feels she hasn't regained enough focus and reassigns her to a smaller client.

When another rape occurs in Bonnie's neighborhood, she is called in to the police station to look at a lineup. However, she is unable to recognize anyone as she never saw her attacker's face. Outside of the police station, she is approached by the other victim and hugged. Not wanting to feel like a victim, she denies anything happened to her and walks away. Later, speaking with the local prosecutor, she learns that if the DNA from the second victim matches the DNA from her, it will be easy to put the assailant in prison. However, the prosecutor tells her if it doesn't match, it will be harder to get Bonnie's assailant in jail as Bonnie's intoxication could make her testimony less credible and the defense attorney in her district is notorious for getting rapists light sentences.

Bonnie goes out drinking with her coworkers again. At the end of the night, her coworkers insist on walking her home. Bonnie gets defensive, believing that Matt had called and asked them to, which they don't deny, but she lets them walk her home anyway. Feeling the incident has become too much of a burden on both of them, Bonnie decides to move out of their apartment, much to Matt's sadness. She temporarily moves in with her coworker Jack (Conrad Ricamora). While staying in his apartment, she gets a call from the prosecutor that the DNA from her incident doesn't match that from the other victim nor anyone from police records.

After working late one night, Bonnie walks home and spots another girl walking with her headphones on. Bonnie confronts the girl in front of her apartment building and accuses her of being reckless, but the girl brushes her off as crazy. She returns to Jack's apartment and breaks down. While Jack consoles her, her mother calls. She decides to reveal the assault to her mom with Jack present. She later gains the courage to attend group therapy again, and she finally returns home to Matt.

== Cast ==
- Stephanie Beatriz as Bonnie
- Michael Stahl-David as Matt
- Conrad Ricamora as Jack
- Catherine Curtin as Kirra
- Olga Merediz as Mariana
- Cindy Cheung as Joanna
- Susan Heyward as Grace
- Heather Simms as Detective Becca Miller
- Craig Walker as Detective Daniel Lambert

== Release ==
The Light of The Moon premiered in March 2017 South by Southwest Film Festival in Austin, Texas, where it won the Audience Award in the Narrative Feature Competition and was purchased for distribution by Imagination Worldwide. Amazon has acquired the streaming rights to the film it will be released on the Amazon Video Direct platform in early 2018.

The film had a limited North American theatrical release on November 1, 2017.

== Reception ==
On review aggregator website Rotten Tomatoes, the film holds an approval rating of 97% based on 34 reviews, with an average rating of 7.4/10. The website's critical consensus states, "The Light of the Moon traces one woman's tortured journey beyond sexual assault with powerful empathy, marking writer-director Jessica M. Thompson as a talent to watch." Metacritic gave the film a score of 76 out of 100 based on 9 critical reviews, indicating "generally favorable reviews".

The Light of The Moon was positively reviewed in both The Hollywood Reporter, which stated that "Beatriz and Stahl-David have a combustible energy" and in Variety, which said the film was "harrowingly effective" and "brutally frank without ever lapsing into exploitation. Sensitive without ever being sanctimonious."

== Accolades ==
Award	Date of ceremony	Category	Recipients	Result
Calgary International Film Festival	October 1, 2017	Best International Feature	The Light of the Moon	Nominated
Calgary International Film Festival	October 1, 2017	People's Choice Award - Best Narrative Feature	The Light of the Moon	Nominated
London Film Festival	October 14, 2017	Audience Award - Best Feature	The Light of the Moon	Nominated
Mill Valley Film Festival	October 18, 2017	Audience Award - U.S. Cinema Indie	The Light of the Moon	Nominated
Mill Valley Film Festival	October 18, 2017	Best Narrative Feature	The Light of the Moon	Nominated
SXSW Film Festival	March 14, 2017	Audience Award - Narrative Feature	Jessica M. Thompson	Won
SXSW Film Festival	March 14, 2017	SXSW Gamechanger Award	Jessica M. Thompson	Nominated
SXSW Film Festival	March 14, 2017	SXSW Grand Jury Award - Best Narrative Feature	Jessica M. Thompson	Nominated
Woodstock Film Festival	October 14, 2017	Ultra Indie Award	The Light of the Moon	Nominated
