= Michael Stahl-David =

American actor (born 1982)

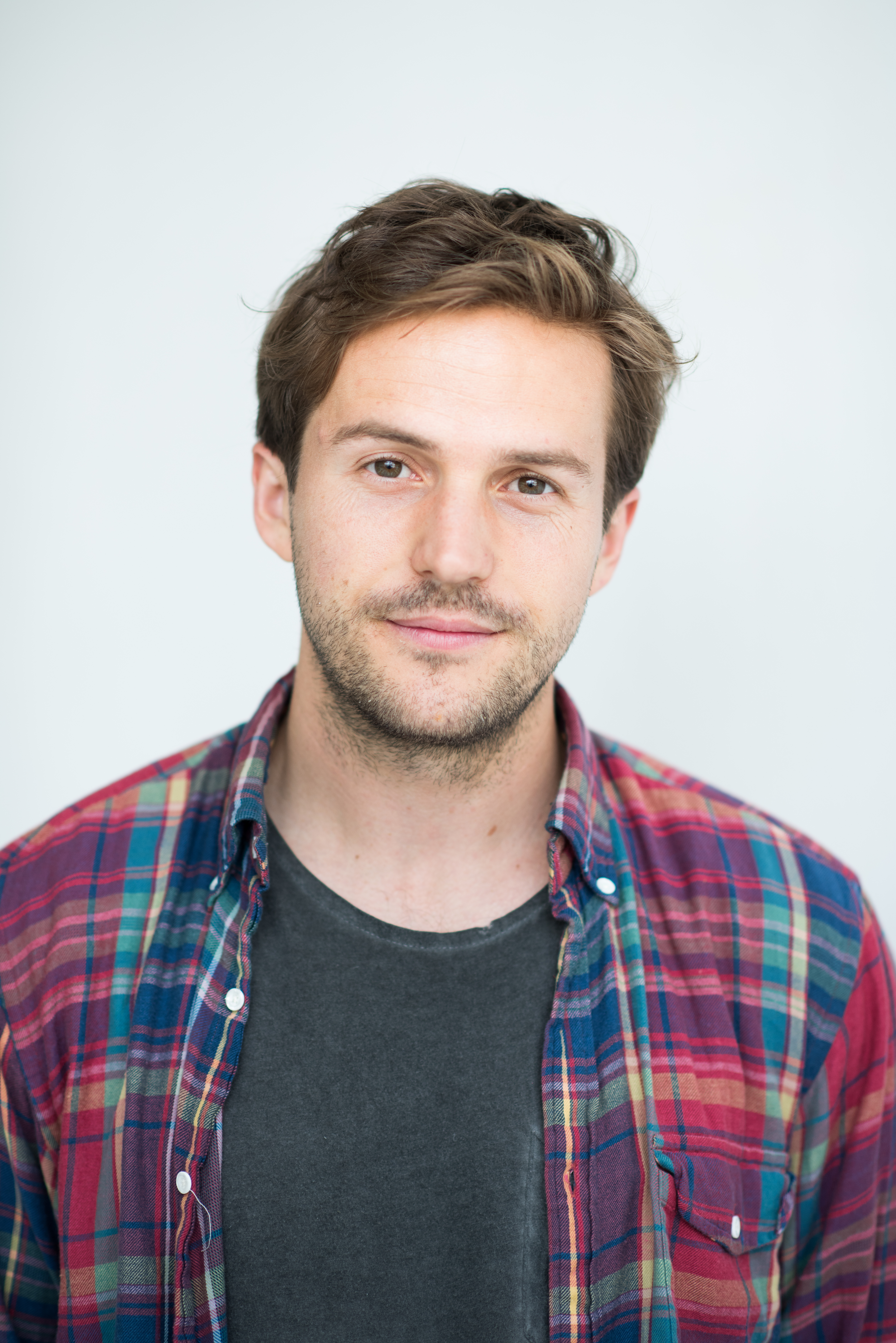
- Stahl-David in 2022
- Born: October 28, 1982 (age 44); Chicago, Illinois, U.S.
- Occupations: Actor, director
- Years active: 2001–present
- Children: 1

Michael Stahl-David (born October 28, 1982) is an American actor, known for his role as Sean Donnelly on the NBC drama series The Black Donnellys and his lead role as Robert "Rob" Hawkins in the J. J. Abrams-produced film Cloverfield.

== Early life ==
Stahl-David was born in Chicago, Illinois, the son of physicians. He graduated from Columbia College Chicago. He is the older brother to Eric Stahl-David and R. Andrew Stahl-David, both of whom graduated from Whitney Young Magnet High School. Prior to his acting career, Stahl-David was a graffiti artist in Chicago.

== Career ==
Stahl-David began his acting career in 2001, when he played a minor role of Rossetti in New Port South. In 2003, he played a minor role as Craig in Uncle Nino. During this time he was active in the Chicago theater scene, appearing in plays at the Steppenwolf Theatre (One Arm, Theater District), Victory Gardens Theater (Cider House Rules, Lost in Yonkers), and the Goodman Theatre (The Goat, or Who Is Sylvia?) Shortly after arriving in New York in 2005, he appeared as Peter in The Diary of Anne Frank at the Paper Mill Playhouse. In the winter of 2007 he enjoyed critical success in his role in The Overwhelming Off-Broadway. Stahl-David began his television acting career in 2007, when he made a guest appearance as Riordan Grady in the series Law & Order: Criminal Intent episode "Players". Later in 2007, he portrayed Sean Donnelly, one of the four Irish brothers, in the short-lived series The Black Donnellys. The following year he appeared in the J.J. Abrams-produced Cloverfield playing the role of Rob. In September 2008, Stahl-David starred in and directed the web series Michael Stahl-David: Behind the Star on Crackle.

In 2010, Stahl-David starred in the ABC mockumentary series My Generation, which was cancelled after two episodes due to low ratings. Stahl-David starred as Kevin in the Off-Broadway play Picked at New York City's Vineyard Theatre from April 6 to May 15, 2011. Stahl-David also starred in the 2014 paranormal romance film In Your Eyes as one of the lead roles.

== Filmography ==
=== Film ===
| Year | Title | Role | Notes |
|---|---|---|---|
| 2001 | New Port South | Rossetti | |
| 2003 | Uncle Nino | Craig | |
| 2008 | Cloverfield | Robert "Rob" Hawkins | |
| 2008 | The Project | Justin | |
| 2010 | No Deal | Mark | Short film; also producer and writer |
| 2012 | Girls Against Boys | Simon | |
| 2013 | Love & Air Sex | Stan | |
| 2013 | The Congress | Steve | |
| 2013 | Mutual Friends | Paul | |
| 2014 | Take Care | Kyle | |
| 2014 | In Your Eyes | Dylan Kershaw | |
| 2015 | Lay in Wait | Robert | Short film |
| 2016 | LBJ | Robert F. Kennedy | |
| 2016 | The Promise | Brad | |
| 2017 | The Light of the Moon | Matt | |
| 2017 | Please Stand By | Jack | |
| 2025 | Looking Through Water | Young William McKay | |
| 2025 | Protector | Detective John BLake | |
| 2026 | The Last Day | Ben | Post-production |

=== Television ===
| Year | Title | Role | Notes |
|---|---|---|---|
| 2007 | Law & Order: Criminal Intent | Riordan Grady | Episode: "Players" |
| 2007 | The Black Donnellys | Sean "Seanny" Donnelly | Main role; 13 episodes |
| 2009 | Kings | Paul Ash | 3 episodes |
| 2009 | Numbers | Josh Skinner | Episode: "Animal Rites" |
| 2009 | Mercy | Phil | Episode: "I Believe You Conrad" |
| 2010 | My Generation | Steven Foster | Main role |
| 2012 | Person of Interest | William Ingram | 2 episodes |
| 2013 | Don't Trust the B— in Apartment 23 | Teddy | Episode: "Teddy Trouble..." |
| 2014 | New Girl | Ian | Episode: "Goldmine" |
| 2015 | Newsreaders | Chip Dunstreet | Episode: "How the Sausage Is Made; Lottery Winners Lose" |
| 2015 | The Good Wife | Nathan Bacevich | Episode: "Undisclosed Recipients" |
| 2015 | Show Me a Hero | James Surdoval | Miniseries; 6 episodes |
| 2015 | Just in Time for Christmas | Jason Stewart | Television film |
| 2017 | Narcos | DEA agent Chris Feistl | Main role (season 3) |
| 2018 | The Deuce | Kenneth | Main role (season 2) |
| 2019 | Chambers | Coach Jones | 5 episodes |
| 2019 | Evil | Tom McCrystal | Episode: "Rose390" |
| 2019–2020 | Almost Family | Donovan | 8 episodes |
| 2022 | Good Sam | Dr. Caleb Tucker | Main cast |

=== Web ===
| Year | Title | Role | Notes |
|---|---|---|---|
| 2008 | T Takes | The guest in Room 102 | Episode: "Room 102" |

== Theatre ==
| Year | Title | Role | Notes |
|---|---|---|---|
| 2003 | The Goat, or Who Is Sylvia? | Billy | Goodman Theatre; November 10 – December 2, 2003 |
| 2006 | The Diary of Anne Frank | Peter van Daan | Paper Mill Playhouse; January 18 – February 26, 2006 |
| 2007 | Strangers Knocking | Michael | Acorn Theater; May 14 – June 3, 2007 |
| 2007 | The Overwhelming | Geoffrey Exley | Laura Pels Theatre; October 23 – December 23, 2007 |
| 2011 | Picked | Kevin | Vineyard Theatre; April 6 – May 15, 2011 |
| 2013–2014 | The Commons of Pensacola | Gabe | Manhattan Theatre Club; November 21, 2013 – February 9, 2014 |
| 2015 | Buzzer | Don | The Public Theater; March 21 – April 28, 2015 |
| 2016 | Engagements | Mark | Second Stage Theater; July 18 – August 14, 2016 |
