= Ingrid Torelli =

Australian actress

- Born: 2006 (age 19–20); Melbourne, Australia
- Occupation: Actress
- Years active: 2018–present

Ingrid Torelli is an Australian actress. She is best known for playing Persephone Brennan in the Showtime drama series The End and Lilly in the horror film Late Night with the Devil.

== Early life ==
Torelli was born in 2006 in Melbourne, Australia.

== Career ==
She won an Helpmann Award in 2016 for her portrayal of Matilda in the Melbourne production of Matilda the Musical. She starred as Persephone Brennan in the Showtime drama series The End. Her first big film role came playing Lilly in the horror movie Late Night with the Devil. She revealed prior to making the movie she never celebrated Halloween but became interested after filming was completed. She is currently filming a survival thriller film called Breathe Deep. She will play the lead role alongside Michiel Huisman and Avani Gregg.

== Personal life ==
Her other interests include acrobatics and craft.

== Filmography ==
=== Film ===
| Year | Title | Role | Notes |
|---|---|---|---|
| 2018 | One Last Leaf | Alice | Short |
| 2018 | They Can't Hear You | Skye | Short |
| 2019 | The Mirror | Suzie | Short |
| 2021 | Breathe | Jade | Short |
| 2023 | Late Night with the Devil | Lilly | |
| 2024 | Force of Nature: The Dry 2 | Margot Russell | |
| 2025 | Howl | Daisy | Short |
| 2026 | Breathe Deep | Addy Frost | |

=== Television ===
| Year | Title | Role | Notes |
|---|---|---|---|
| 2020 | The End | Persephone Brennan | 10 episodes |
| 2020 | Bloom | Eva | 6 episodes |
| 2019-2023 | Five Bedrooms | Mia Chigwell-Bourke | 10 episodes |
