= 100 Bloody Acres =

2012 film by Colin and Cameron Cairnes

- Theatrical release poster
- Directed by: Cameron Cairnes; Colin Cairnes
- Written by: Cameron Cairnes; Colin Cairnes
- Produced by: Julie Ryan; Kate Croser
- Starring: Damon Herriman; Angus Sampson; Anna McGahan
- Cinematography: John Brawley
- Edited by: Dale Dunne; Joshua Waddell
- Music by: Glenn Richards
- Production company: Cyan Films
- Distributed by: Hopscotch
- Release date: 4 August 2012 (MIFF)
- Running time: 90 minutes
- Box office: $6,388 (US)

100 Bloody Acres is a 2012 Australian horror comedy film directed and written by brothers Colin and Cameron Cairnes. Damon Herriman and Angus Sampson star as opportunistic, rural fertiliser manufacturers who resort to using human remains for their business. It premiered at the Melbourne International Film Festival on 4 August 2012, and it was released in the United States on 28 June 2013.

== Plot ==
Reg and Lindsay Morgan own and operate a small blood and bone fertiliser business in South Australia. While making local deliveries and the occasional roadkill pick up, Reg encounters the crash site of a van, the driver dead inside. Recovering the body from the crash, he puts it in the back of his own truck. Making his way back to the brothers' plant, Reg is delayed again, this time by three tourists stuck on the side of the road: Sophie, a young woman; James, Sophie's boyfriend; and Wes, James' friend, with whom Sophie is having an affair. Reg takes an instant attraction to Sophie, and, against his better judgement, allows the three to ride with him.

Wes and James ride in the back of the truck with the hidden corpse, and Sophie rides up front with Reg. Sophie gets to know Reg, while James tells Wes that he plans to marry Sophie. The pair soon discover the corpse and fear for their lives. Sophie starts to find things in common with Reg, but Reg's anxiety gets the better of him. This unnerves Sophie, and, as soon as the truck arrives at the plant, Reg detains her. Lindsay arrives and demands to know what is going on. Reg suggests that they can grind the people into fertiliser, and Lindsay berates him for his lack of planning for such a bold crime. Ultimately, Lindsay agrees to Reg's idea, and it is revealed that the pair have ground humans in the past: in order to create a new formula for their fertiliser, the pair ground a group of charity volunteers who crashed and died in a nearby road accident.

Wes and James are soon detained with Sophie, and the trio watch as Reg and Lindsay grind the driver. At the last minute, Reg becomes convinced that the man is still alive and tries to save him, to no avail. When Wes cuts himself loose and escapes, Lindsay pursues him. Sophie takes advantage of the situation and attempts to seduce Reg, much to James' chagrin. Reg catches on to the ruse and exposes Sophie's infidelity with Wes, further angering James. Lindsay soon returns with Wes, acquiring the body of a local police officer along the way. Reg now begins to have serious second thoughts about the pair's actions. When Nancy, their elderly neighbour, surprises the brothers with a visit, Lindsay stuffs Reg in a car boot with Wes, cutting off Wes' hand in the process. Reg and Wes work together to escape, and Reg enters the house alone to confront his brother.

Reg overhears Lindsay tell Nancy that Reg has moved away, perhaps permanently. As Reg gathers his courage, Lindsay and Nancy begin to have sex. Severely disturbed, Reg decides instead to stealthily steal Lindsay's keys. As he is about to take them, Wes stumbles into the house, looking for his missing hand. In a fit of rage, Lindsay kills Wes and Nancy, and Reg flees with the keys. James and Sophie panic when they hear the gunshots, but Sophie decides to return to the farm when she hears Reg call out to her; James angrily breaks up with Sophie as she leaves. After a brief struggle, Lindsay overpowers and ties up Reg. As Lindsay prepares Reg for grinding, Sophie returns and distracts Lindsay. Reg is able to pull him in to the grinder, killing him; afterward, Sophie and Reg share a momentary attraction. In a post credits scene, James hysterically runs onto the road and is struck and killed by the truck of frustrated "Morgans Organic" customer "Charlie Wick & Sons", the potato farmer, determined to get his fertilizer that he's been denied over the course of the movie.

== Cast ==
- Damon Herriman as Reg Morgan
- Angus Sampson as Lindsay Morgan
- Anna McGahan as Sophie
- Oliver Ackland as James
- James "Jamie" Kristian as Wes
- Chrissie Page as Nancy
- John Jarratt as Burke
- Paul Blackwell as Charlie Wick

== Production ==
Producer Julie Ryan met the Cairnes brothers at the Australian Film Commission's IndiVision Lab in 2008. Her company Cyan Films (then including Kate Croser) became attached to the project just prior to the Cairnes brothers winning the Horror-Thriller category for scriptwriting at the 2010 Slamdance Writing Competition. The film was funded by Screen Australia, South Australian Film Corporation, Film Victoria and the Melbourne International Film Festival Premiere Fund.

In January 2012, production for the film started in Adelaide, South Australia.

== Release ==
The film premiered at the Melbourne International Film Festival in August 2012. It was then an Official Selection at the 2013 Brussels International Fantastic Film Festival, and released in the US on 28 June 2013.

== Reception ==
As of May 2020 Rotten Tomatoes, a review aggregator, reported that 79% of 38 surveyed critics gave the film a positive review; the average rating was 6.48/10. Metacritic rated it 63/100.

Matt Zoller Seitz of RogerEbert.com called it "the best low-budget horror comedy since Shaun of the Dead, and one of the most assured first features in ages." Jeannette Catsoulis of The New York Times wrote that film lacks originality but "has its own hick charm, mostly because of performers who never overplay their hands." Mark Olsen of the Los Angeles Times called it a "giddy, delightful gross-out horror-comedy mash-up". Drew Hunt of the Chicago Reader wrote, "Though entertaining enough as a genre exercise, the film is too simplistic to transcend its base concept." Megan Lehmann of The Hollywood Reporter called it an "off-the-wall Australian splatter-comedy" with "lively performances" and "a shrewdly structured screenplay". Richard Kuipers of Variety called it "a gory and funny riff on the trusty standby of city kids being menaced by rural types". Kwenton Bellette of Twitch Film wrote that it "stand out from most horrors; it plays with convention and molds it into a sick and twisted form."

=== Awards ===
Award	Category	Subject	Result
AACTA Award (3rd)	Best Original Screenplay	Cameron Cairnes; Colin Cairnes	Nominated
AACTA Award (3rd)	Best Supporting Actor	Angus Sampson	Nominated
Australian Film Critics Association Awards	Best Supporting Actor	Angus Sampson	Nominated
Australian Film Critics Association Awards	Best Actor	Damon Herriman	Nominated
Australian Film Critics Association Awards	Best Actress	Anna McGahan	Nominated
Australian Film Critics Association Awards	Best Script	Cameron Cairnes; Colin Cairnes	Nominated
Catalan International Film Festival	Carnet Jove Jury Award - Midnight X-Treme	Cameron Cairnes; Colin Cairnes	Won

== See also ==
- Cinema of Australia
