= Ian Meadows =

Australian actor and writer

- Born: 1983 (age 42–43); Collie, Western Australia
- Education: Curtin University; Western Australian Academy of Performing Arts
- Occupations: Actor, playwright, writer
- Years active: 2003–current
- Known for: Home and Away; Mao's Last Dancer; The Pacific
- Relatives: Neroli Meadows (sister); Paul Ritter (grandfather)

Ian Meadows is an Australian actor, playwright and writer.

== Early life and education ==
Born and raised in Collie, Western Australia, Meadows trained at Curtin University and the Western Australian Academy of Performing Arts (WAAPA), graduating in 2005. His older brother Ross Meadows played hockey for Australia and his younger sister Neroli Meadows is a sports journalist on Fox Sports Australia and Fox Footy.

== Acting career ==
Meadows' highest profile television role to date was as Rocco Cooper, a young troubled boy who was forced by his brother to try and take out Sally Fletcher, on the long-running Australian soap opera Home and Away.

Other roles have included a part in The Shark Net, Elliot in Tripping Over, a single-episode role as Jeff Weiss on All Saints, and a major role in the short films Brothers, Legacy, Water, as well as the 2009 film Mao's Last Dancer and the miniseries The Pacific.

Meadows' theatre credits include Modern International Dead at the Griffin Theatre Company in Sydney in 2008 for which he earned a nomination for Best Newcomer at the Sydney Theatre Awards 2008. He appeared in the Russian play Ladybird at the Belvoir St Theatre, Sydney in March 2009, which he also helped produce and re-write to localise in Australia.

In 2010, Meadows had a recurring role in police series Rush, playing James, the son of Inspector Kerry Vincent (played by Catherine McClements). He also played Pvt. Cecil Evans in HBO miniseries The Pacific, which was filmed mostly in Australia.

In 2011, Meadows was seen in the ABC telemovie Paper Giants: The Birth of Cleo, playing the role of photographer Andrew Cowell, and also appeared in a season three episode of East West 101, playing Simon. That same year, he reprised his guest starring role of James Vincent in Rush.

Meadows starred in A Moody Christmas, an ABC comedy series which aired on ABC1 in the weeks leading up to Christmas 2012. A follow-up series The Moodys aired on ABC1 in early 2014.

During 2016 and 2017, Meadows played a leading role as Pete in Network 10's Australian drama series, The Wrong Girl. He starred in the 2016 horror drama film Scare Campaign, as lead character Marcus. He then appeared as Matt Aldin in the 2021 Australian/American Netflix drama Clickbait.

Meadows is also a writer, having written episodes for Spirited, SLiDE, Offspring, The Moodys, Playing for Keeps and RFDS. He co-wrote the short film, Water (in which he also appeared), and also co-wrote, directed and produced the short film A Parachute Falling in Siberia, which screened in both national and international festivals, winning an AWGIE Award for Best Short Film Script, and earning an Australian Film Institute Award nomination for Best Short Screenplay. He also wrote and performed Between Two Waves at Sydney's Griffin Theatre.

== Awards and nominations ==
Year	Category	Award	Work	Result	Ref.
2008	Best Newcomer	Sydney Theatre Awards	Modern International Dead	Nominated	
2010	Best Screenplay in a Short Film	Australian Film Institute Awards (Note: AFI Award shared with Sarah Shaw.)	A Parachute Falling in Siberia	Nominated	
2010	Best Screenplay in a Short Film	AWGIE Awards (Note: AWGIE Award shared with Sarah Shaw.)	A Parachute Falling in Siberia	Won	
2011	Best Live Action Short Film	Bruce Corwin Award	A Parachute Falling in Siberia	Nominated	
2012	Television – Series	AWGIE Awards	Spirited (episode "Living in Oblivion")	Nominated	
2013	Emerging Playwrights	NSW Philip Parsons Fellowship for Emerging Playwrights	Between Two Waves	Won	
2014	Best Direction	AACTA Awards (Note: AACTA Award shared with Jonathan auf der Heide, Tony Ayres, Jub Clerc, Robert Connolly, Shaun Gladwell, Rhys Graham, Justin Kurzel, Yaron Lifschitz, Anthony Lucas, Claire McCarthy, Ashlee Page, Stephen Page, Simon Stone, Warwick Thornton, Marieka Walsh, Mia Wasikowska, David Wenham.)	The Turning	Nominated	
2014	Best Screenplay	AFCA Awards (Note: AFCA Award shared with Marieka Walsh, Warwick Thornton, Jub Clerc, Justin Monjo, Kris Mrksa, Rhys Graham, Ashlee Page, Marcel Dorney, Claire McCarthy, Emily Ballou, Mia Wasikowska, Andrew Upton, David Wenham, Jonathan auf der Heide, Justin Kurzel, Circa Contemporary Circus.)	The Turning	Nominated	
2019	Most Outstanding Supporting Actor	Logie Awards	Dead Lucky	Nominated	

== Filmography ==
=== Television ===
Year	Title	Role	Notes
2003	The Shark Net	Ritchie Male	Miniseries, episode 3
2006	All Saints	Jeff Weiss	Season 9, episode 18: "One for the Road"
2006	Tripping Over	Elliot	Miniseries, episodes 3–5
2006–2007	Home and Away	Rocco Cooper	Seasons 19–20, 16 episodes
2009	3 Acts of Murder	George Floyd	TV movie
2010	The Pacific	Pvt. Cecil Evans	Miniseries, episode 2: "Basilone"
2010–2011	Rush	James Vincent	Seasons 3–4, 5 episodes
2011	Underbelly Files: The Man Who Got Away	Der. Sgt. Tim Fry	TV movie
2011	Paper Giants: The Birth of Cleo	Andrew Cowell	Miniseries, episodes 1 & 2
2011	East West 101	Simon	Season 3, episode 4: "Transit of Venus"
2012	A Moody Christmas	Dan Moody	Season 1, 6 episodes
2014	Rake	Paul Wendon	Season 3, 4 episodes
2014	The Moodys	Dan Moody	Season 1, 8 episodes
2014	Parer's War	Terry Banks	TV movie
2015	8MMM Aboriginal Radio	Jake	Season 1, 6 episodes
2016–2017	The Wrong Girl	Pete Barnett	Seasons 1–2, 18 episodes
2018	Dead Lucky	Corey Baxter	Miniseries, episodes 1–4
2018	True Story with Hamish & Andy	John	Season 2, episode 7: "Lisa"
2021	Clickbait	Matt Aldin	Miniseries, episodes 1–8
2021	RFDS	Shaun Everett	Season 1, episode 6

=== Film ===
Year	Title	Role	Notes
2003	John 'Rocky' Robinson: Roll with the Punches	Mark Kingston	Short film
2003	Brothers	Patty	Short film
2005	Postcard Vernosti	David	Short film
2006	Iron Bird	Thomas	Short film
2007	The Other Half	Dean	Short film
2007	The Last Supper	(unnamed role)	Short film
2008	Legacy	Donald	Short film
2009	Early Checkout	Porter	Short film
2009	Water	Ryan	Short film
2009	Mao's Last Dancer	WTC Backstage Manager	Feature film
2011	Happy Birthday	Katey's Dad (voice)	Short film
2011	Colin the Dog's Fabulous Midnight Adventure and Another Story	Younger Giles	Short film
2013	The Fragments	Joel	Short film
2016	Scare Campaign	Marcus	Feature film
2016	Killing Ground	Ian Smith	Feature film
2016	Measuring the Jump	Lee	Short film
2017	Operation: Native	Self appearance	Documentary

=== As writer / director ===
Year	Title	Role	Notes
2009	Water	Writer	Short film
2010	A Parachute Falling in Siberia	Writer / director	Short film
2010–2011	Spirited	Writer	Season 1, episodes 2 & 4, season 2, episode 9
2011	Offspring	Writer	Season 2, episode 5
2011	SLiDE	Writer	Season 1, episode 8
2013	The Turning	Writer (screenplay) / Director	Feature film, segment "Defender"
2014	The Moodys	Writer	Season 1, episode 7
2017	House Husbands	Writer	Season 3, episodes 5 & 8
2017	The Wrong Girl	Writer	Season 2, episodes 3 & 8
2018	Playing for Keeps	Writer	Season 1, episodes 3 & 7
2018	On the Ropes	Writer	Miniseries, 4 episodes
2019	SeaChange	Writer	Season 4, episode 7
2021	RFDS	Writer	Season 1, episodes 1-2 & 5–6

== Theatre ==
Year	Title	Role	Notes
2005	Electra		New Theatre, Perth with WAAPA
2005	The Tempest		Ron Stone Park, Perth with WAAPA
2006	MAJ Monologues – The Risk Accessor	Daniel	Brainbox
2008	The Modern International Dead	Luke	Stables Theatre, Sydney with Griffin Theatre Company, Sydney
2009	Ladybird	Dima	Belvoir Street Theatre, Sydney
2011	The Coming World	Ed	Darlinghurst Theatre, Sydney
2011	Neighbourhood Watch	Martin	Belvoir Street Theatre, Sydney
2012; 2014	Between Two Waves	Daniel	Stables Theatre, Sydney with Griffin Theatre Company, Sydney, Bakehouse Theatre, Adelaide with STCSA
2013	Other Desert Cities	Trip	Southbank Theatre, Melbourne with MTC
2014	Blue/Orange	Bruce	Ensemble Theatre, Sydney
	War	Deak	Hayman
	House Family Play	Featured	Hayman
	The Risk Assessor	Daniel	Brainbox
2015	The Weir	Brendan	Fairfax Studio, Melbourne with MTC

=== As writer / director ===
Year	Title	Role	Notes
2009	Ladybird	Producer / Re-writer	Belvoir St Theatre, Sydney
2011	Four Deaths in the Life of Ronaldo Abok	Writer / Co-director	Riverside Theatres Parramatta with True West Theatre
2012–2014	Between Two Waves	Writer	Stables Theatre, Sydney with Griffin Theatre Company, Sydney, Bakehouse Theatre, Adelaide with STCSA

== Book ==
Year	Title	Publisher	Ref.
2012	Between Two Waves	Currency Press	
