= Adam White (footballer) =

Australian sportsman and filmmaker (born 1976)

Personal information
- Born: 9 January 1976 (age 50)
- Original team: East Burwood/Eastern Ranges
- Height: 188 cm (6 ft 2 in)
- Weight: 83 kg (183 lb)

Playing career
Years	Club	Games (Goals)
1997–2000	Carlton	44 (21)

Adam White (born 9 January 1976) is an Australian sportsman and filmmaker.

== Australian rules football career ==
White played for Carlton in the Australian Football League from 1997 to 2001.

White is best remembered for his accidental collision with an umpire during a match, a collision that resulted in White knocking himself out.

== Film career ==
After retiring from professional football due to injury (unrelated to the umpire incident), White launched a new career as an independent filmmaker.

His first independently produced short film was A Black and White World, which played at a number of festivals.

White followed with Toucan 2008, for which he received funding support from Film Australia.

== Filmography ==
=== Director ===
- A Black and White World (short) – 2005
- Toucan (short) – 2007
- Attack (short) – 2011
- Kane & Disabled (TV series, 10 episodes) – 2012

=== Editor ===
- A Black and White World (short) – 2005
- Trampoline (short) – 2008
- Lowdown (TV series, 5 episodes) – 2010
- Attack (short) – 2011
- The Match Committee (TV series, 26 episodes) – 2011
- Santo, Sam and Ed's Sports Fever! (TV series, all 10 episodes) – 2012
- Kane & Disabled (TV series, 10 episodes) – 2012
- Scare Campaign - 2016
