= Pioneer Oil Refinery =

Historical landmark in Santa Clarita, California

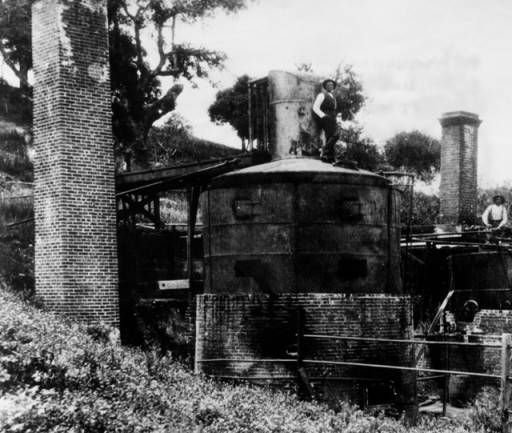
- Pioneer Oil Refinery in 1880

- Location within Santa Clarita Location within the Los Angeles metropolitan area Location within California
- 34°22′12″N 118°31′11″W
- Location: 23802 Pine Street; Santa Clarita, California 91321

History
- Built: 1876

California Historical Landmark
- Designated: March 6, 1935
- Reference no.: 172

U.S. National Register of Historic Places
- Designated: December 11, 2020
- Reference no.: 100005942

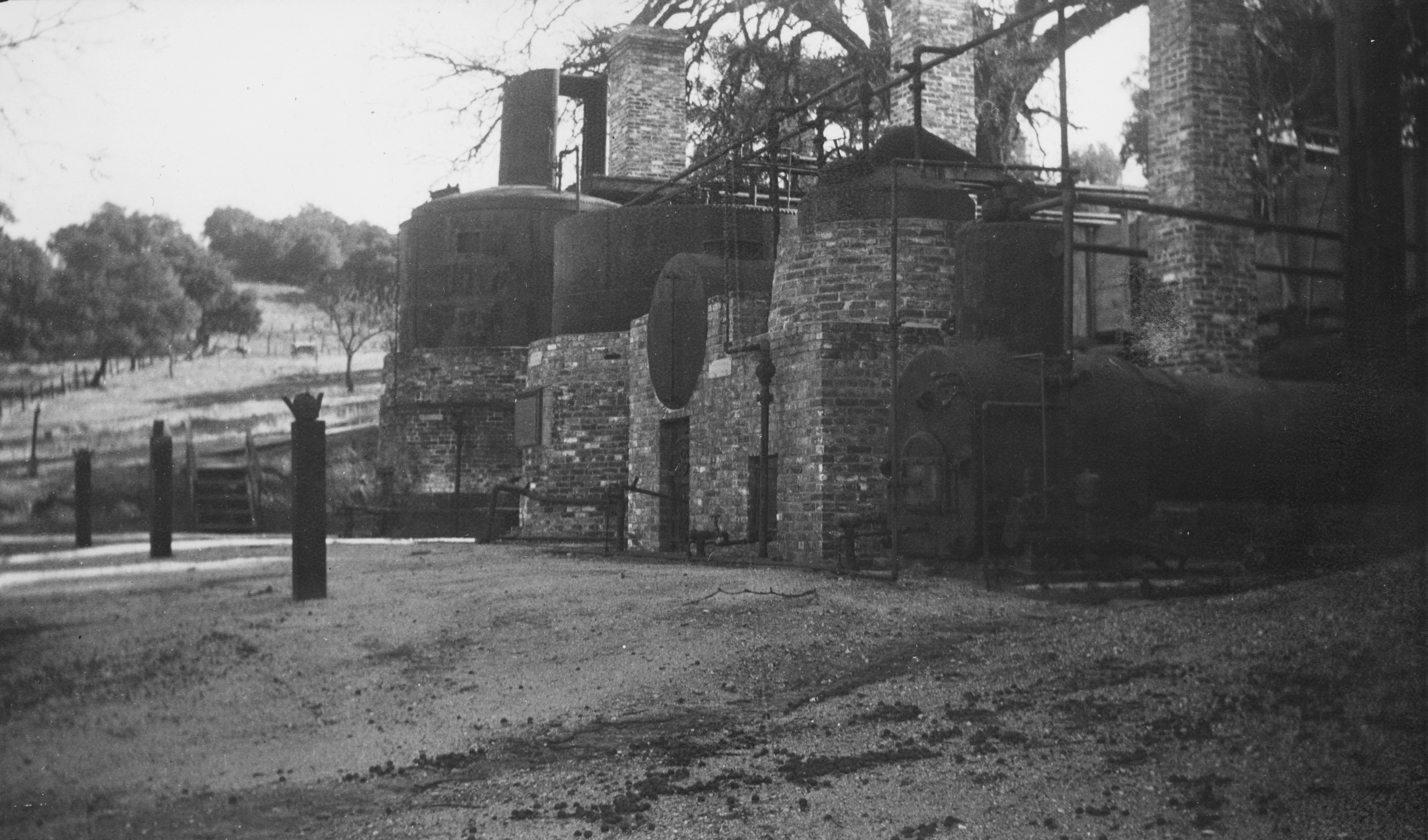
Pioneer Oil Refinery

The Pioneer Oil Refinery was the first successful oil refinery in California, built in 1876 off Pine Street in Newhall, Santa Clarita, California. The Pioneer Oil Refinery was designated a California Historic Landmark (No.172) on March 6, 1935. Pioneer Oil Refinery is the oldest existing refinery in the world. The Lang Southern Pacific Station railroad line served the refinery. In 2020, the refinery was added to the National Register of Historic Places; it is the only site on the National Register of Historic Places within the city of Santa Clarita.

Pioneer Oil Refinery was built by California Star Oil Works, which became part of Standard Oil of California and then part of Chevron. Chevron still owns the Pioneer Oil Refinery land. Chevron has plans on the table to restore the site. Some of the original parts of the refinery were taken away after it closed in 1884, some to museums and other parts to private collectors. The large kettles used to refine the crude oil in to kerosene and benzene are still on the site, along with an old wooden drill tower. Chevron still gives some tours of the site.

== Marker ==
Marker on the site reads:

- "NO. 172 PIONEER OIL REFINERY - In 1875 the Star Oil Company, one of the predecessors of the Standard Oil Company of California, drilled its first Pico Canyon well, which yielded about one hundred barrels per day. The discovery resulted in the erection of the first commercial oil refinery in California the following year."
- Pioneer Oil Refinery is also listed on the sites of Historic Mechanical Engineering Landmarks as site No. 8.

== See also ==
- Pico Canyon Oilfield
- California Historical Landmarks in Los Angeles County
- List of California Ranchos
- History of oil in California through 1930
- Ranchos of Los Angeles County, California
- Petroleopolis
- D. G. Scofield pioneer of the oil business in California
