= There Will Be Blood =

2007 film by Paul Thomas Anderson

- Theatrical release poster
- Directed by: Paul Thomas Anderson
- Written by: Paul Thomas Anderson
- Based on: Oil! by Upton Sinclair
- Produced by: JoAnne Sellar; Scott Rudin; Paul Thomas Anderson; Daniel Lupi
- Starring: Daniel Day-Lewis; Paul Dano; Kevin J. O'Connor; Ciarán Hinds; Dillon Freasier
- Cinematography: Robert Elswit
- Edited by: Dylan Tichenor
- Music by: Jonny Greenwood
- Production companies: Paramount Vantage; Miramax Films; Ghoulardi Film Company; Scott Rudin Productions
- Distributed by: Paramount Vantage (United States); Miramax Films (International; through Buena Vista International) (Note: Since the acquisition of Miramax by ViacomCBS (now known as Paramount Skydance) on April 3, 2020, Paramount Pictures owns the worldwide rights to the film.)
- Release dates: September 27, 2007 (Fantastic Fest); December 26, 2007 (United States)
- Running time: 158 minutes
- Country: United States
- Language: English
- Budget: $25 million
- Box office: $76.2 million

There Will Be Blood is a 2007 American epic period drama film co-produced, written and directed by Paul Thomas Anderson, loosely based on the 1927 novel Oil! by Upton Sinclair. It stars Daniel Day-Lewis, Paul Dano, Kevin J. O'Connor, Ciarán Hinds, and Dillon Freasier. The film follows silver miner-turned-oilman Daniel Plainview (Day-Lewis) as he embarks on a ruthless quest for wealth during the Californian oil boom in the late 19th and early 20th centuries.

Development on There Will Be Blood began after writer Eric Schlosser purchased the film rights to Sinclair's novel in 2004. It was acquired by Ghoulardi Film Company, Paramount Vantage and Miramax Films after Anderson completed the first draft of the film's screenplay. Day-Lewis immediately joined the project while Dano, who initially signed on for a smaller role, took on a starring role after replacing Kel O'Neill during filming. Principal photography began in June 2006 and lasted until that September, with filming locations including Los Angeles and Marfa, Texas. The film's music was composed by Radiohead guitarist Jonny Greenwood.

There Will Be Blood premiered at Fantastic Fest in Austin on September 29, 2007. It was first theatrically released in New York City and Los Angeles on December 26 and in selected international markets on January 25, 2008. It grossed $76.2 million worldwide and received acclaim from critics, with praise for the cinematography, Anderson's direction and screenplay, music, and performances of Day-Lewis and Dano. The National Board of Review, the American Film Institute and the National Society of Film Critics named There Will Be Blood one of the top-ten films of 2007. The film was nominated for eight awards at the 80th Academy Awards, winning two (Best Actor for Day-Lewis and Best Cinematography for Elswit) and received numerous other accolades. It topped various lists of the best films of the 2000s and was Anderson's best-reviewed film until 2025's One Battle After Another.

== Plot ==
In 1898, Daniel Plainview finds silver while prospecting in New Mexico but breaks his leg. Dragging himself from the pit, he takes a sample to an assay office and receives a silver and gold claim. In 1902, he discovers oil in California. Following the death of a worker in an accident, Daniel adopts his orphaned son, H.W., in order to pass himself off as a family man to potential investors.

In 1911, Daniel is approached by Paul Sunday, a young man who tells him of an oil deposit in Little Boston. Daniel visits the Sundays' property in Little Boston and meets Paul's twin brother Eli, a preacher. Daniel attempts to purchase the farm from the Sundays at a bargain price under the ruse of using it to hunt quail, but his motives are questioned by Eli, who knows the land has oil. In exchange for the property, Eli demands $10,000 for his church. Plainview counters with a $5,000 offer, and an agreement is made and Daniel acquires all the available land in and around the Sunday property, except for the land owned by one holdout, William Bandy.

After Daniel reneges on an agreement to let Eli bless the well before drilling begins, a series of misfortunes occur: an accident kills one worker and a gas blowout deafens H.W. and destroys the drilling infrastructure. When Eli publicly demands the money still owed to him, Daniel beats and humiliates him. At the dinner table that night, Eli attacks and berates his father for having trusted Daniel.

A man arrives at Daniel's doorstep, claiming to be his half-brother, Henry. Later that night, H.W. sets fire to their shack. Daniel chases, restrains, and then sends H.W. to a school for the deaf in San Francisco.

Standard Oil offers to buy out Daniel's local interests, but Daniel refuses and instead strikes a deal with Union Oil to build a pipeline. However, Bandy's ranch remains an impediment.

Daniel becomes suspicious of Henry after he fails to recognize a childhood joke and confronts him one night at gunpoint. "Henry" confesses that he was a friend of the real Henry, who died of tuberculosis, and that he had impersonated Henry in the hope that Daniel could give him a job. An enraged Daniel murders him and buries his body. After looking through the real Henry's journal that the imposter Henry had with him revealing that the real Henry was traveling to meet him, Daniel drinks and weeps. The next morning, Daniel is awakened by Bandy, who knows of Daniel's crime and wants him to publicly repent in Eli's church in exchange for an easement to run his pipeline across the ranch. As part of his baptism, Eli humiliates Daniel and coerces him into confessing that he abandoned his child. Later, while the pipeline is being built, H.W. reunites with Daniel and Eli becomes a missionary.

In 1927, H.W. marries Paul and Eli's sister Mary. Daniel, now extremely wealthy but an alcoholic, lives alone in a large mansion. H.W. asks his father to dissolve their partnership so that he can move to Mexico with Mary and start his own drilling company. Daniel angrily mocks H.W.'s deafness before revealing his true origins and disowning him as his son. H.W. leaves after thanking God he is not related to Daniel.

Eli, now a radio preacher, visits a drunken Daniel in the bowling alley in his basement. Eli asks Daniel to partner with the church in drilling Bandy's property. Daniel agrees on the condition that Eli denounce his faith and himself as a false prophet. Once Eli acquiesces, Daniel reveals that he already drained the property of its oil supply by capture and taunts Eli for his misfortune in investments he made when the market crashed. Daniel torments Eli further by telling him a lie about how he gave his brother $10,000 instead and is now a wealthy man. He chases Eli around the alley and bludgeons him to death with a bowling pin. When his butler appears to investigate the commotion, Daniel announces, "I'm finished."

== Cast ==
- Daniel Day-Lewis as Daniel Plainview
- Paul Dano as Paul & Eli Sunday
- Kevin J. O'Connor as "Henry"
- Ciarán Hinds as Fletcher Hamilton
- Russell Harvard as H.W. Plainview
  - Dillon Freasier as young H.W. Plainview
- Colleen Foy as Mary Sunday
  - Sydney McCallister as young Mary Sunday
- David Willis as Abel Sunday
- Hans Howes as William Bandy
- Paul F. Tompkins as Prescott
- Jim Downey as Al Rose
- David Warshofsky as H.M. Tilford
- Barry Del Sherman as H.B. Ailman

== Themes and analysis ==
Critics see the film as a commentary on the nature of capitalism and greed, and its inherent national presence in America. David Denby of The New Yorker described the film as being about "the driving force of capitalism as it both creates and destroys the future" and goes on to say that "this movie is about the vanishing American frontier. The thrown-together buildings look scraggly and unkempt, the homesteaders are modest, stubborn, and reticent, but, in their undreamed-of future, Wal-Mart is on the way." Daniel Plainview's "I have a competition in me" speech has been looked upon as important when analyzing the film from this angle.

Others have noted themes of faith, religion, and family. James Christopher of The Times viewed the film as "a biblical parable about America's failure to square religion and greed."

== Production ==
=== Development ===
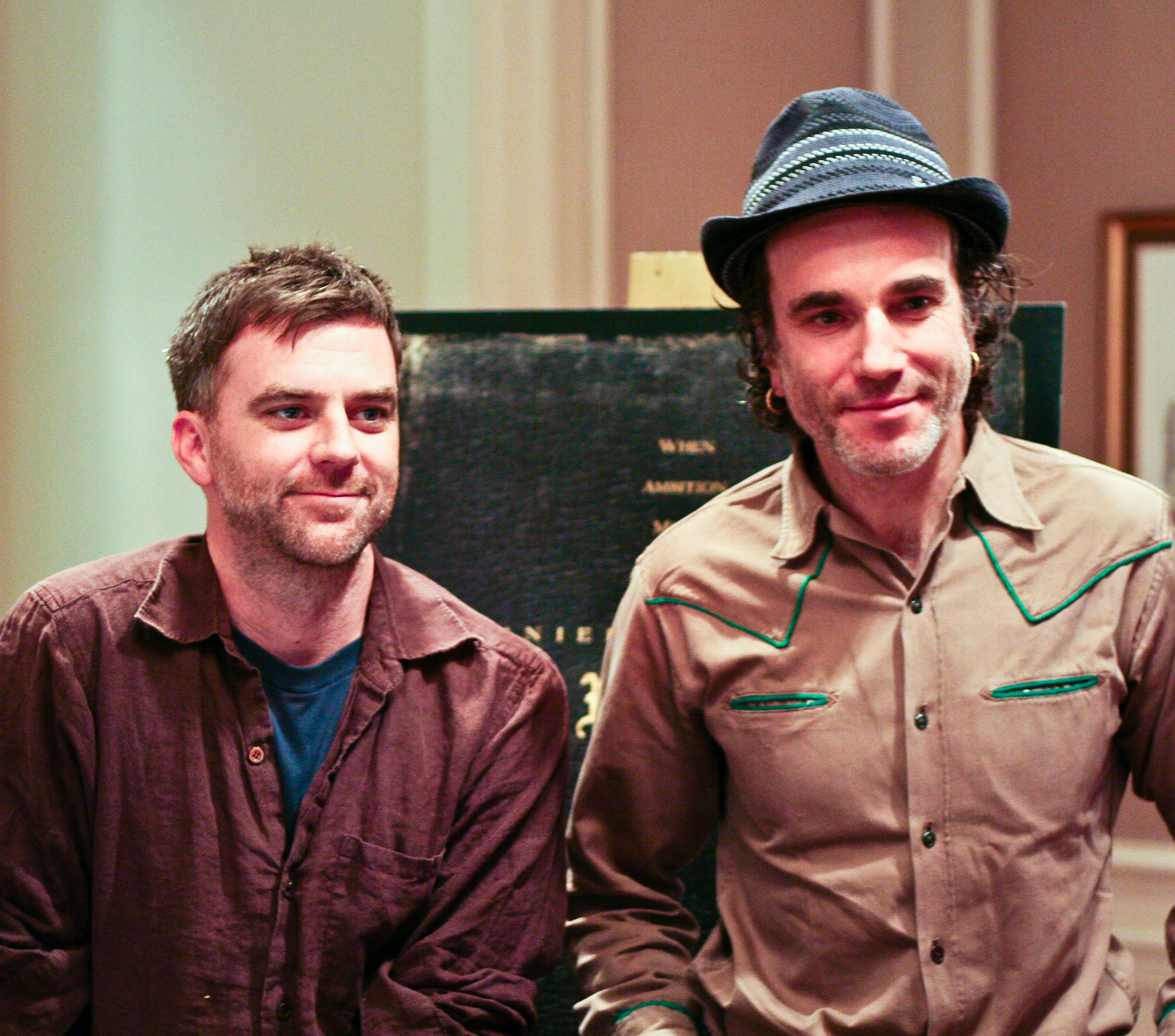
Paul Thomas Anderson and Daniel Day-Lewis in New York, December 2007.

After Eric Schlosser finished writing Fast Food Nation, many reporters noted similarities to Upton Sinclair's book The Jungle. Although Schlosser had not read the book and was unfamiliar with Sinclair's other works, comparisons between the two books prompted Schlosser to read Sinclair's works, including the novel Oil!. Schlosser, who found the book to be exciting and thought it would make an excellent film, sought out the Sinclair estate and purchased the film rights. Schlosser intended to find a director who was as passionate about the book as he was but director Paul Thomas Anderson approached him first.

Anderson had an existing screenplay about two fighting families. He struggled with the script and soon realized it was not working. Homesick while away in London, Anderson purchased a copy of Oil!, drawn to its cover illustration of a California oilfield. Inspired by the novel, Anderson contacted Schlosser and adapted the first 150 pages to a screenplay. Research trips to museums dedicated to early oilmen in Bakersfield assisted Anderson in the development of the screenplay. Anderson changed the title from Oil! to There Will Be Blood because he felt "there's not enough of the book [in the film] to feel like it's a proper adaptation".

He said of writing the screenplay:

I can remember the way that my desk looked, with so many different scraps of paper and books about the oil industry in the early 20th century, mixed in with pieces of other scripts that I'd written. Everything was coming from so many different sources. But the book was a great stepping-stone. It was so cohesive, the way Upton Sinclair wrote about that period, and his experiences around the oil fields and these independent oilmen. That said, the book is so long that it's only the first couple hundred pages that we ended up using, because there is a certain point where he strays really far from what the original story is. We were really unfaithful to the book. That's not to say I didn't really like the book; I loved it. But there were so many other things floating around. And at a certain point, I became aware of the stuff he was basing it on. What he was writing about was the life of [oil barons] Edward Doheny and Harry Sinclair. So it was like having a really good collaborator, the book.

Anderson, who had said that he would like to work with Daniel Day-Lewis, wrote the screenplay with Day-Lewis in mind and approached Day-Lewis when the script was nearly complete. Anderson had heard that Day-Lewis liked his earlier film Punch-Drunk Love, which gave him the confidence to hand Day-Lewis a copy of the incomplete script. According to Day-Lewis, being asked to do the film was enough to convince him. In an interview with The New York Observer, he elaborated that what drew him to the project was "the understanding that [Anderson] had already entered into that world, [he] wasn't observing it – [he'd] entered into it – and indeed [he'd] populated it with characters [who he] felt had lives of their own".

Anderson said that the line in the final scene, "I drink your milkshake!", was paraphrased from a quote by former Secretary of the Interior and U.S. Senator from New Mexico, Albert Fall, speaking before a Congressional investigation into the 1920s oil-related Teapot Dome scandal. Anderson said he was fascinated "to see that word [milkshake] among all this official testimony and terminology" to explain the complicated process of oil drainage. In 2014, an independent attempt to locate the statement in Fall's testimony proved unsuccessful—an article published in the Case Western Reserve Law Review suggested that the actual source of the paraphrased quote may instead have been remarks in 2003 by Sen. Pete Domenici of New Mexico during a debate over drilling in the Arctic National Wildlife Refuge. In those remarks, Domenici stated:

The oil is underground, and it is going to be drilled and come up. Here is a giant reservoir underground. Just like a curved straw, you put it underground and maneuver it, and the 'milk shake' is way over there, and your little child wants the milk shake, and they sit over here in their bedroom where they are feeling ill, and they just gobble it up from way down in the kitchen, where you don't even have to move the Mix Master that made the ice cream for them. You don't have to take it up to the bedroom. This describes the actual drilling that is taking place.

According to Joanne Sellar, one of the film's producers, the film was difficult to finance because "the studios didn't think it had the scope of a major picture". It took two years to acquire financing for the film. For the role of Plainview's "son", Anderson looked at people in Los Angeles and New York City, but he realized that they needed someone from Texas who knew how to shoot shotguns and "live in that world". The filmmakers asked around at a school and the principal recommended Dillon Freasier. They did not have him read any scenes and instead talked to him, realizing that he was the perfect person for the role.

To build his character, Day-Lewis started with the voice. Anderson sent him recordings from the late 19th century to 1927 and a copy of the 1948 film The Treasure of the Sierra Madre, including documentaries on its director, John Huston, an important influence on Anderson's film. According to Anderson, he was inspired by the fact that Sierra Madre is "about greed and ambition and paranoia and looking at the worst parts of yourself." While writing the script, he would put the film on before he went to bed at night. To research for the role, Day-Lewis read letters from laborers and studied photographs from the time period. He also read up on oil tycoon Edward Doheny, upon whom Sinclair's book is loosely based.

=== Filming ===
Principal photography began in June 2006 on a ranch in Marfa, Texas, and took three months. Other location shooting took place in Los Angeles. The film was shot using Panavision XL 35 mm cameras outfitted primarily with Panavision C series and high-speed anamorphic lenses. Anderson tried to shoot the script in sequence with most of the sets on the ranch.

Two weeks in, Anderson replaced the actor playing Eli Sunday (Kel O'Neill) with Paul Dano, who had originally been cast only in the much smaller role of Paul Sunday, the brother who tipped off Plainview about the oil on the Sunday ranch. A profile of Day-Lewis in The New York Times Magazine suggested that original actor Kel O'Neill had been intimidated by Day-Lewis's intensity and habit of staying in character on and off the set. Anderson, Day-Lewis, and O'Neill all denied this claim, and Day-Lewis stated, "I absolutely don't believe that it was because he was intimidated by me. I happen to believe that—and I hope I'm right." O'Neill ascribed his dismissal to a poor working relationship with Anderson and his diminished interest in acting.

Anderson first saw Dano in The Ballad of Jack and Rose and thought that he would be perfect to play Paul Sunday, a role he originally envisioned to be a 12 or 14-year-old boy. Dano only had four days to prepare for the much larger role of Eli Sunday, but he researched the time period that the film is set in as well as evangelical preachers. The previous two weeks of scenes with Sunday and Plainview had to be re-shot with Dano instead of O'Neill.

The interior mansion scenes were filmed at the Greystone Mansion in Beverly Hills, the former real-life home of Edward Doheny Jr., a gift from his father, Edward Doheny. Scenes filmed at Greystone involved the careful renovation of the basement's two-lane bowling alley. Anderson said it was "a particular situation, because it was so narrow that there could only be a very limited number of people at any given time, maybe five or six behind the camera and then the two boys." Day-Lewis later broke a rib in a fall during filming.

Anderson dedicated the film to Robert Altman, who died during editing.

=== Music ===
Anderson had been a fan of Radiohead's music and was impressed with Jonny Greenwood's scoring of the film Bodysong. While writing the script for There Will Be Blood, Anderson heard Greenwood's orchestral piece "Popcorn Superhet Receiver", which prompted him to ask Greenwood to work with him. After initially agreeing to score the film, Greenwood had doubts and thought about backing out, but Anderson's reassurance and enthusiasm for the film convinced him to continue. Anderson gave Greenwood a copy of the film and three weeks later he came back with two hours of music recorded at Abbey Road Studios in London. Concerning his approach to composing the soundtrack, Greenwood said to Entertainment Weekly:

I think it was about not necessarily just making period music, which very traditionally you would do. But because they were traditional orchestral sounds, I suppose that's what we hoped was a little unsettling, even though you know all the sounds you're hearing are coming from very old technology. You can just do things with the classical orchestra that do unsettle you, that are sort of slightly wrong, that have some kind of undercurrent that's slightly sinister.

In December 2008, Greenwood's score was nominated for a Grammy in the category of "Best Score Soundtrack Album for Motion Picture, Television or Other Visual Media" for the 51st Grammy Awards. It features classical music, such as the third movement ("Vivace Non Troppo") of Johannes Brahms's Violin Concerto in D Major and Arvo Pärt's "Fratres" for cello and piano.

Greenwood's score was awarded the Silver Bear for Outstanding Artistic Contribution (music) at the 58th Berlin International Film Festival in 2008.

== Release ==
=== Box office performance ===
The first public screening of There Will Be Blood was on September 29, 2007, at Fantastic Fest in Austin, Texas. The film was released on December 26, 2007, in New York City and Los Angeles where it grossed US$190,739 on its opening weekend. The film then opened in 885 theaters in selected markets on January 25, 2008, grossing $4.8 million on its opening weekend. The film went on to make $40.2 million in North America and $36 million in the rest of the world, with a worldwide total of $76.2 million, well above its $25 million budget; however, the prints and advertising cost for the film's United States release cost about $40 million.

=== Home media ===
The film was released on DVD on April 8, 2008. An HD DVD release was announced, but later canceled due to the discontinuation of the format. A Blu-ray edition was released on June 3, 2008.

== Reception and legacy ==
=== Critical response ===
On review aggregator Rotten Tomatoes, There Will Be Blood has an approval rating of 92% based on 241 reviews, with an average rating of 8.8/10. The website's critical consensus reads, "Widely touted as a masterpiece, this sparse and sprawling epic about the underhanded 'heroes' of capitalism boasts incredible performances by leads Daniel Day-Lewis and Paul Dano, and is director Paul Thomas Anderson's best work to date." On Metacritic, the film has a weighted average score of 93 out of 100, based on 42 critics, indicating "universal acclaim".

Andrew Sarris called the film "an impressive achievement in its confident expertness in rendering the simulated realities of a bygone time and place, largely with an inspired use of regional amateur actors and extras with all the right moves and sounds." In Premiere, Glenn Kenny praised Day-Lewis's performance: "Once his Plainview takes wing, the relentless focus of the performance makes the character unique." Manohla Dargis wrote, in her review for The New York Times, "the film is above all a consummate work of art, one that transcends the historically fraught context of its making, and its pleasures are unapologetically aesthetic."

Esquire praised Day-Lewis's performance: "what's most fun, albeit in a frightening way, is watching this greedmeister become more and more unhinged as he locks horns with Eli Sunday ... both Anderson and Day-Lewis go for broke. But it's a pleasure to be reminded, if only once every four years, that subtlety can be overrated." Richard Schickel in Time praised There Will Be Blood as "one of the most wholly original American movies ever made." Critic Tom Charity, writing about CNN's ten-best films list, calls the film the only "flat-out masterpiece" of 2007.

Schickel also named the film one of the Top 10 Movies of 2007, ranking it at No. 9, calling Daniel Day-Lewis's performance "astonishing", and calling the film "a mesmerizing meditation on the American spirit in all its maddening ambiguities: mean and noble, angry and secretive, hypocritical and more than a little insane in its aspirations." James Christopher, chief film critic for The Times, published a list in April 2008 of his top 100 films, placing There Will Be Blood in second place, behind only Casablanca.

Some critics were positive toward the work but less laudatory, often criticizing its ending. Mick LaSalle of the San Francisco Chronicle, challenged the film's high praise by saying "there should be no need to pretend There Will Be Blood is a masterpiece just because Anderson sincerely tried to make it one" and noting that "the scenes between Day-Lewis and Dano ultimately degenerate into a ridiculous burlesque." Several months after LaSalle's initial review of the film, he reiterated that while he still did not consider There Will Be Blood to be a masterpiece, he wondered if its "style, an approach, an attitude... might become important in the future."

Roger Ebert assigned the film three and a half out of four stars and wrote, "There Will Be Blood is the kind of film that is easily called great. I am not sure of its greatness. It was filmed in the same area of Texas used by No Country for Old Men, and that is a great film, and a perfect one. But There Will Be Blood is not perfect, and in its imperfections (its unbending characters, its lack of women or any reflection of ordinary society, its ending, its relentlessness) we may see its reach exceeding its grasp. Which is not a dishonorable thing."

Carla Meyer of the Sacramento Bee, who gave the film the same star rating as Ebert, opined that the final confrontation between Daniel and Eli marked when the work "stops being a masterpiece and becomes a really good movie. What was grand becomes petty, then overwrought." In 2014, Peter Walker of The Guardian likewise argued that the scene "might not be the very worst scene in the history of recent Oscar-garlanded cinema ... but it's perhaps the one most inflated with its own delusional self-importance."

Since 2008, the film has been included in the book 1001 Movies You Must See Before You Die and every revised edition released afterwards. Total Film placed it at number three in their list of the 50 best movies of Total Film's lifetime. In The Guardian, journalist Steve Rose ranked it the 17th best arthouse film of all time, and in a separate 2019 ranking a panel of four Guardian journalists ranked it the best film of the 21st century. In 2024, filmmaker Quentin Tarantino named it one of the best films of the 21st century, although, in the following year, he criticized Dano's performance and instead wanted to replace Austin Butler as a better choice if he had to pick the best.

=== Top ten lists ===
The film was on the American Film Institute's Top 10 Movies of the Year; AFI's jury said:

There Will Be Blood is bravura film-making by one of American film's modern masters. Paul Thomas Anderson's epic poem of savagery, optimism and obsession is a true meditation on America. The film drills down into the dark heart of capitalism, where domination, not gain, is the ultimate goal. In a career defined by transcendent performances, Daniel Day-Lewis creates a character so rich and so towering, that "Daniel Plainview" will haunt the history of film for generations to come.

The film appeared on many critics' top ten lists of the best films of 2007.

- 1st – Ethar Alter, Giant
- 1st – Marjorie Baumgarten, The Austin Chronicle
- 1st – Tom Charity, CNN
- 1st – Manohla Dargis, The New York Times
- 1st – David Fear, Time Out New York
- 1st – Scott Foundas, LA Weekly
- 1st – Stephen Holden, The New York Times
- 1st – Tod Hill, Staten Island Advance
- 1st – Glenn Kenny, Premiere
- 1st – Craig Outhier, Orange County Register
- 1st – Keith Phipps, The A.V. Club
- 1st – Ray Pride, Salon.com
- 1st – Mike Russell, The Oregonian
- 1st – Hank Sartin, Chicago Reader
- 1st – Marc Savlov, The Austin Chronicle
- 1st – Mark Slutsky, Montreal Mirror
- 1st – Nick Schager, Slant Magazine
- 1st – Lisa Schwarzbaum, Entertainment Weekly
- 1st – Jan Stuart, Newsday
- 1st – Ella Taylor, LA Weekly
- 2nd – David Ansen, Newsweek
- 2nd – Nathan Rabin, The A.V. Club
- 2nd – Rene Rodriguez, the Miami Herald
- 2nd – Scott Tobias, The A.V. Club
- 3rd – A.O. Scott, The New York Times (tied with Sweeney Todd: The Demon Barber of Fleet Street)
- 3rd – Ann Hornaday, The Washington Post
- 3rd – Joe Morgenstern, The Wall Street Journal
- 4th – Desson Thomson, The Washington Post
- 4th – Ty Burr, The Boston Globe
- 5th – J. Hoberman, The Village Voice
- 5th – Shawn Levy, The Oregonian
- 6th – Christy Lemire, Associated Press
- 7th – Peter Travers, Rolling Stone
- 9th – Claudia Puig, USA Today
- 9th – Richard Schickel, TIME magazine
- Top 10 (listed alphabetically, not ranked) – Dana Stevens, Slate

=== Decade-end lists ===
Review aggregator site Metacritic, when comparing over 40 'top ten of the decade' lists from various notable publications, found There Will Be Blood to be the most mentioned, appearing on 46% of critics' lists and being ranked the decade's best film on five of them.

In December 2009, Peter Travers of Rolling Stone chose the film as the No. 1 film of the decade, saying:

Two years after first seeing There Will Be Blood, I am convinced that Paul Thomas Anderson's profound portrait of an American primitive—take that, Citizen Kane—deserves pride of place among the decade's finest. Daniel Day-Lewis gave the best and ballsiest performance of the past 10 years. As Daniel Plainview, a prospector who loots the land of its natural resources in silver and oil to fill his pockets and gargantuan ego, he showed us a man draining his humanity for power. And Anderson, having extended Plainview's rage from Earth to heaven in the form of a corrupt preacher (Paul Dano), managed to "drink the milkshake" of other risk-taking directors. If I had to stake the future of film in the next decade on one filmmaker, I'd go with PTA. Even more than Boogie Nights and Magnolia—his rebel cries from the 1990s—Blood let Anderson put technology at the service of character. The score by Radiohead's Jonny Greenwood was a sonic explosion that reinvented what film music could be. And the images captured by Robert Elswit, a genius of camera and lighting, made visual poetry out of an oil well consumed by flame. For the final word on Blood, I'll quote Plainview: "It was one goddamn hell of a show."

Chicago Tribune and At the Movies critic Michael Phillips named There Will Be Blood the decade's best film. Phillips stated:

This most eccentric and haunting of modern epics is driven by oilman Daniel Plainview, who, in the hands of actor Daniel Day-Lewis, becomes a Horatio Alger story gone horribly wrong. Writer/director Paul Thomas Anderson's camera is as crucial to the film's hypnotic pull as the performance at its center. For its evocation of the early 1900s, its relentless focus on one man's fascinating obsessions, and for its inspiring example of how to freely adapt a novel—plus, what I think is the performance of the new century—There Will Be Blood stands alone. The more I see it, the sadder, and stranger, and more visually astounding it grows—and the more it seems to say about the best and worst in the American ethos of rugged individualism. Awfully good!

Entertainment Weekly critic Lisa Schwarzbaum named There Will Be Blood the decade's best film as well. In her original review, Schwarzbaum stated:

Anyhow, a fierce story meshing big exterior-oriented themes of American character with an interior-oriented portrait of an impenetrable man (two men, really, including the false prophet Sunday) is only half Anderson's quest, and his exciting achievement. The other half lies in the innovation applied to the telling itself. For a huge picture, There Will Be Blood is exquisitely intimate, almost a collection of sketches. For a long, slow movie, it speeds. For a story set in the fabled bad-old-days past, it's got the terrors of modernity in its DNA. Leaps of romantic chordal grandeur from Brahms' Violin Concerto in D Major announce the launch of a fortune-changing oil well down the road from Eli Sunday's church—and then, much later, announce a kind of end of the world. For bleakness, the movie can't be beat—nor for brilliance.

In December 2009, the website Gawker.com determined that There Will Be Blood is film critics' consensus best film of the decade when aggregating all Best of the Decade lists, stating: "And when the votes were all in, by a nose, There Will Be Blood stood alone at the top of the decade, its straw in the whole damn cinema's milkshake."

The list of critics who lauded There Will Be Blood in their assessments of films from the past decade include:

- The A.V. Club
- The Daily Telegraph
- Peter Bradshaw of The Guardian
- Slant Magazine
- Time Out New York
- David Denby, The New Yorker
- Scott Foundas, SF Weekly
- David Germain and Christy Lemire, The Associated Press
- Bill Goodykoontz, The Arizona Republic
- Ann Hornaday, The Washington Post
- Wesley Morris, The Boston Globe
- Michael Phillips, Chicago Tribune
- Lisa Schwarzbaum, Entertainment Weekly
- Dana Stevens, Slate Magazine
- Peter Travers, Rolling Stone
- Chris Vognar, The Dallas Morning News

The February 2020 issue of New York Magazine lists There Will Be Blood alongside Citizen Kane, Sunset Boulevard, Dr. Strangelove, Butch Cassidy and the Sundance Kid, The Conversation, Nashville, Taxi Driver, The Elephant Man, Pulp Fiction, In the Bedroom, and Roma as "The Best Movies That Lost Best Picture at the Oscars."

=== Best of the Century lists ===
Filmmakers Denis Villeneuve, Antoine Fuqua, Darius Khondji, Cord Jefferson, Joanna Hogg, Reinaldo Marcus Green, Kate Berlant, Josh Safdie, Robert Eggers and Jason Blum have all cited the film as among the best of the 21st century.

In 2016, it was voted the number three in the BBC's 100 Greatest Films of the 21st Century as picked by 177 film critics from around the world. In the same year, the Directors Guild of America ranked the film 61st on its list of The 80 Best-Directed Films since the Guild’s founding in 1936. In 2021, members of Writers Guild of America West (WGAW) and Writers Guild of America, East (WGAE) ranked its screenplay 7th in WGA’s 101 Greatest Screenplays of the 21st Century (so far). The film was tied for 122nd place in the 2022 Sight and Sound critic's poll.

In June 2025, the film ranked number three on The New York Times' list of "The 100 Best Movies of the 21st Century" and ranked number 4 on its "Readers' Choice" edition of the list.

In July 2025, Rolling Stone ranked There Will Be Blood as the best movie of the 21st century.

=== Accolades ===
Award	Date of ceremony	Category	Recipient(s)	Result
Academy Awards	February 24, 2008			
Academy Awards	February 24, 2008	Best Picture	Daniel Lupi, JoAnne Sellar and Paul Thomas Anderson	Nominated
Academy Awards	February 24, 2008	Best Director	Paul Thomas Anderson	Nominated
Academy Awards	February 24, 2008	Best Actor	Daniel Day-Lewis	Won
Academy Awards	February 24, 2008	Best Adapted Screenplay	Paul Thomas Anderson	Nominated
Academy Awards	February 24, 2008	Best Art Direction	Art Direction: Jack Fisk; Set Decoration: Jim Erickson	Nominated
Academy Awards	February 24, 2008	Best Cinematography	Robert Elswit	Won
Academy Awards	February 24, 2008	Best Film Editing	Dylan Tichenor	Nominated
Academy Awards	February 24, 2008	Best Sound Editing	Christopher Scarabosio and Matthew Wood	Nominated
American Film Institute	December 16, 2007	Top 10 Films		Won
Austin Film Critics Association Awards	December 20, 2007	Top 10 Films		1st place
Austin Film Critics Association Awards	December 20, 2007	Best Film		Won
Austin Film Critics Association Awards	December 20, 2007	Best Director	Paul Thomas Anderson	Won
Austin Film Critics Association Awards	December 20, 2007	Best Actor	Daniel Day-Lewis	Won
Austin Film Critics Association Awards	December 20, 2007	Best Cinematography	Robert Elswit	Won
Austin Film Critics Association Awards	December 20, 2007	Best Score	Jonny Greenwood	Won
Australian Film Critics Association Awards	January 22, 2008	Best Overseas Film		Won
BAFTA Awards	February 10, 2008	Best Film	JoAnne Sellar, Paul Thomas Anderson and Daniel Lupi	Nominated
BAFTA Awards	February 10, 2008	Best Direction	Paul Thomas Anderson	Nominated
BAFTA Awards	February 10, 2008	Best Adapted Screenplay	Paul Thomas Anderson	Nominated
BAFTA Awards	February 10, 2008	Best Actor in a Leading Role	Daniel Day-Lewis	Won
BAFTA Awards	February 10, 2008	Best Actor in a Supporting Role	Paul Dano	Nominated
BAFTA Awards	February 10, 2008	Best Film Music	Jonny Greenwood	Nominated
BAFTA Awards	February 10, 2008	Best Production Design	Jack Fisk, Jim Erickson	Nominated
BAFTA Awards	February 10, 2008	Best Cinematography	Robert Elswit	Nominated
BAFTA Awards	February 10, 2008	Best Sound	Matthew Wood	Nominated
Belgian Syndicate of Cinema Critics	January 10, 2009	Grand Prix		Nominated
Broadcast Film Critics Association	January 7, 2008	Best Film		Nominated
Broadcast Film Critics Association	January 7, 2008	Best Actor	Daniel Day-Lewis	Won
Broadcast Film Critics Association	January 7, 2008	Best Composer	Jonny Greenwood	Won
Directors Guild of America	January 26, 2008	Outstanding Directing – Feature Film	Paul Thomas Anderson	Nominated
Golden Eagle Award	January 23, 2009	Best Foreign Language Film	There Will Be Blood	Won
Golden Globe Awards	January 14, 2008	Best Actor – Motion Picture Drama	Daniel Day-Lewis	Won
Golden Globe Awards	January 14, 2008	Golden Globe Award for Best Motion Picture – Drama		Nominated
Los Angeles Film Critics Association	December 9, 2007	Best Film		Won
Los Angeles Film Critics Association	December 9, 2007	Best Director	Paul Thomas Anderson	Won
Los Angeles Film Critics Association	December 9, 2007	Best Actor	Daniel Day-Lewis	Won
Los Angeles Film Critics Association	December 9, 2007	Best Screenplay	Paul Thomas Anderson	Runner-up
Los Angeles Film Critics Association	December 9, 2007	Best Cinematography	Robert Elswit	Runner-up
Los Angeles Film Critics Association	December 9, 2007	Best Production Design	Jack Fisk	Won
Los Angeles Film Critics Association	December 9, 2007	Best Music	Jonny Greenwood	Runner-up
National Society of Film Critics	January 5, 2008	Best Film		Won
National Society of Film Critics	January 5, 2008	Best Director	Paul Thomas Anderson	Won
National Society of Film Critics	January 5, 2008	Best Actor	Daniel Day-Lewis	Won
National Society of Film Critics	January 5, 2008	Best Screenplay	Paul Thomas Anderson	Nominated
National Society of Film Critics	January 5, 2008	Best Cinematography	Robert Elswit	Won
Screen Actors Guild Awards	January 27, 2008	Outstanding Performance by a Male Actor in a Leading Role	Daniel Day-Lewis	Won
Writers Guild of America Awards	February 9, 2008	Best Adapted Screenplay	Paul Thomas Anderson (Screenplay); Upton Sinclair (Author)	Nominated
Producers Guild of America Awards	February 2, 2008	Best Theatrical Motion Picture		Nominated
American Society of Cinematographers Awards	January 26, 2008	Outstanding Achievement in Cinematography in Theatrical Releases	Robert Elswit	Won

== See also ==
- List of films featuring the deaf and hard of hearing
- List of American independent films
- List of films considered the best

== Notes ==
Awards
Preceded by Letters from Iwo Jima	LAFCA Award for Best Film; 2007	Succeeded by WALL-E
Preceded by Pan's Labyrinth	NSFC Award for Best Film; 2007	Succeeded by Waltz with Bashir
