= Jongsma =

Jongsma is a surname. Notable people with the surname include:

- Anton Jongsma (born 1983), Dutch Antillean footballer
- Eline Jongsma, Dutch film director and artist
- Wik Jongsma (1943–2008), Dutch film actor
