= Tim Hetherington Trust =

Tim Hetherington Trust logo

The Tim Hetherington Trust was set up in 2012 by the late English photojournalist Tim Hetherington's parents Judith and Alistair. Stephen Mayes has been its executive director since 2013. The Trust's website states its mission is "to preserve the legacy of Tim’s professional life as a visual storyteller and human rights advocate" including "the support and nurture of new work that continues the ideals demonstrated by Tim with special emphasis on humanitarian and social concerns".

== Tim Hetherington Visionary Award ==
In 2014 the Trust founded the Visionary Award for innovation in visual storytelling. It awards £20,000 and a mentor to one artist or duo to work on their proposed project. It seeks to encourage artists and journalists whose work crosses the boundaries of art, reportage and technology to innovate in terms of Hetherington's goal of "how do we use media in a way that is really effective?".

=== Recipients ===
- 2015: Eline Jongsma and Kel O'Neill for The Ark
- 2016: Dominic Bracco II for The Backs Of Men
- 2017: Omar Imam for Syrialism (or What Syrians Want)
- 2018: Laia Abril for A History Of Misogyny, Chapter 2: On Rape Culture
- 2019: Hannah Reyes Morales for Living Lullabies
- 2020: Kiana Hayeri for Promises Written On The Ice, Left In The Sun
- 2021: The Preempt Group (Mbali Dhlamini and Phumulani Ntuli)
- 2022: Lyra directed by Alison Millar

== See also ==
- W. Eugene Smith Memorial Fund
