= Stephanie Daley =

- Promotional poster
- Directed by: Hilary Brougher
- Written by: Hilary Brougher
- Produced by: Sean Costello; Lynette Howell Taylor; Samara Koffler; Jen Roskind
- Starring: Amber Tamblyn; Tilda Swinton; Timothy Hutton; Melissa Leo
- Cinematography: David Rush Morrison
- Edited by: Keith Reamer
- Music by: David Mansfield
- Production companies: RedBone Films; Silverwood Films
- Distributed by: Regent Releasing
- Release dates: January 21, 2006 (Sundance Film Festival); April 20, 2007 (United States)
- Running time: 88 minutes
- Country: United States
- Language: English
- Budget: <$1 million

Stephanie Daley (retitled What She Knew for American television) is a 2006 drama film written and directed by Hilary Brougher. The film stars Amber Tamblyn, Melissa Leo, Tilda Swinton and Timothy Hutton. The film, which received a limited release in North America on April 20, 2007, focuses on the issue of teenage pregnancy.

Stephanie Daley was developed at the Sundance Writers' and Filmmakers' Lab and premiered at the 2006 Sundance Film Festival, where it won the Waldo Salt Screenwriting Award. The film also earned Tamblyn a nomination for Best Supporting Female at the 2006 Independent Spirit Awards and the Leopard Prize for Best Actress at the 2006 Locarno Film Festival.

== Plot ==
In a small town in upstate New York, sixteen-year-old Stephanie Daley collapses in a pool of blood while on a school skiing trip. A doctor discovers there is afterbirth in the blood. Soon afterward, the body of a 26 weeks-old baby girl is found in a bathroom stall, its mouth blocked with toilet paper. Despite Stephanie's insistence that her child was stillborn and that she had no idea that she was pregnant, she is arrested for the murder of the child and becomes derisively known in the local news as the "ski mom".

Awaiting trial, Stephanie is interviewed by forensic psychologist, Lydie Crane, who is approximately 30 weeks-pregnant with a son. Lydie is hired by the prosecution to determine whether Stephanie truly did not know she was pregnant. When Lydie first meets the Daley family, Stephanie's mother is quick to stipulate that Stephanie will not accept a plea bargain.

As Lydie gets Stephanie to open up about the events leading up to her going into labor, flashbacks show Stephanie's background. Stephanie, a shy, inexperienced teenager who is in her school's marching band, is raised by her religious parents and attends a school that teaches abstinence-only sex education. One night, Stephanie goes to a party with her friend Rhana, but averse to socializing with others, she retreats to a room alone. Corey, a recent graduate of her high school, joins her and seduces her into having sex. After their encounter, he enlists in the Marines and she never meets him again.

When Lydie asks Stephanie if she knew this was how she got pregnant, Stephanie avoids the question and claims she was being "punished" by God because she was "weak", and that the pregnancy was a "test". Lydie becomes visibly annoyed at this and reveals to Stephanie that she previously gave birth to a stillborn baby herself and asks Stephanie what she thinks Lydie was being punished for.

Presently, Lydie's marriage to architect husband Paul has grown increasingly strained since the death of their stillborn infant, which she gave birth to only three months prior to conceiving the child she is now pregnant with. As Stephanie discusses her sexual history and her relationship with her parents, Lydie is forced to face her hitherto buried emotions about her own lost child. Suspecting Paul is having an affair, Lydie confronts him about it. Paul claims though he has thought about it, he has not slept with anyone else. He also blames the problems in their marriage on Lydie having not properly grieved for their stillborn baby and suggests she does not truly want the baby she is carrying, which Lydie angrily rebukes.

Stephanie recounts the day of the ski trip to Lydie. In the preceding days, none of her friends are aware of a pregnancy, only observing she is gaining weight, and Stephanie, possibly in a state of denial, does not tell anyone she is pregnant. On the ski slopes, Stephanie begins to go into early labor. She makes it to a bathroom where she quietly but painfully delivers the child on her own. Stephanie says she wrapped the infant in toilet paper and left it there, but still maintains the baby was stillborn.

Some time before her trial is to start, Stephanie is getting a glass of water in her kitchen when a car drives by, with men shouting and heckling her about a baby. This causes Stephanie to break the glass in her hand and unconsciously cut her palm with it, severely upsetting her mother. Stephanie returns to Lydie and says she is going to accept a plea bargain. Lydie states that she thinks this is a good idea and, reaching out to shake Stephanie's hand, she notices the cut and asks what happened. Stephanie recalls to her a memory suppressed from trauma: her baby girl was alive when she delivered her, but was so small, and "her breathing was all wrong", so in her mind she told her child to die, and she did. Stephanie, wracked with guilt, believes she killed her baby with her mind. An emotional Lydie hugs the distraught Stephanie.

== Cast ==
- Tilda Swinton as Lydie Crane
- Amber Tamblyn as Stephanie Daley
- Timothy Hutton as Paul Crane
- Melissa Leo as Miri Daley
- Jim Gaffigan as Joe Daley
- Halley Feiffer as Rhana
- Denis O'Hare as Frank
- Kel O'Neill as Corey White
- Novella Nelson as Dr. Peterson
- Neal Huff as Mr. Thomas
- Kaiulani Lee as Pastor
- Deirdre O'Connell as Jane
- Caitlin Van Zandt as Satin
- Marceline Hugot as Mrs. Gilcrest
- Vincent Piazza as Jeff
- Constance Wu as Jenn

== Production ==
=== Development ===
Hilary Brougher began writing the script in 1999. Brougher said it arose from her fascination with the idea that people lead secret lives or keep aspects of their lives concealed from their loved ones. "After I started writing it, I began noticing items in the news. And, people started to tell me about their unexpected and hidden pregnancies–not all of which ended tragically. My research indicated this sort of thing happens often–and it doesn't always make the headlines."

Brougher added, "I realized that news stories just present the facts, but they don't delve into emotional realities and subtleties of situations...What happens to Stephanie is the sum of many missed opportunities of communication. I wanted to explore how and why that happened, and how, when she starts talking to her mom and to the psychologist, it's transformative in all their lives."

In her research on concealed pregnancies and women accused of neonaticide, Brougher came upon many cases of young women who went into shock or disassociation while in labor. Though safe-haven laws have been enacted to combat the problem of infanticide, Brougher argued the laws do not address the root cause of pregnancy denial and concealment, saying, "[A lot of these women] can't even admit to themselves that they're pregnant. A heater doesn't do a freezing person any good unless they can admit they're cold and turn it on."

Of the script, Brougher said, "I'd like audiences to think about what happens to a woman during pregnancy, rather than just the results. There are a lot of films about what happens when a baby is brought home, but Stephanie Daley is about the window of time during pregnancy, when a woman questions her own identity and her relationship to the world."

The script went through development at the Sundance Institute in 2001. Before finishing the script, Brougher gave birth to twins. As the film was securing financing in the fall of 2004, Tilda Swinton, who had read the script on the recommendation of her agent, signed on to star as Lydie and also as an executive producer. Amber Tamblyn signed on that December.

=== Filming ===
Filming took place in Greene County, New York in the towns of Tannersville, Hunter and Catskill. The ski trip scenes were filmed at Hunter Mountain.

Principal photography began on September 7, 2005, and wrapped on October 6.

== Release ==
Stephanie Daley had its world premiere at the 2006 Sundance Film Festival, where it was awarded with the Waldo Salt Screenwriting prize. It did not get a theatrical release in North America until April 20, 2007, due to the film's controversial subject matter.

== Critical reception ==
On Rotten Tomatoes, Stephanie Daley has an approval rating of 90% based on 51 reviews. The site's critics consensus reads, "The premise has all the trappings of melodrama, but the excellent performances give the characters complexity and empathy." On Metacritic, the film has a score of 77 out of 100 based on 20 reviews, indicating "generally favorable reviews".

Critics lauded the film for its story and attention to detail, particularly Brougher's non-sensationalized approach to a sensitive subject. Owen Gleiberman of Entertainment Weekly wrote, "Shot in a pinpoint, suggestive handheld style, this lacerating drama...shines a piercing light onto some of the hidden terrors of women, especially in an era when abstinence can shade into ignorance. The scary culminating flashback, in which Stephanie gives birth — in a public restroom, on a high school ski trip — is a marvel of authentic disturbance."

Walter Addiego of the San Francisco Chronicle said, "While making a point of Stephanie's Christian beliefs, Brougher is clearly not interested in creating a polemic, either pro-choice or anti-abortion. This is drama, not tabloid or talk-radio stuff." Mary F. Pols of the East Bay Times lauded Brougher's decision to "[root] her story in the real world, the world of girls who are afraid to ask questions, afraid to go to their mothers, afraid to take a close look at their own bodies."

Stephen Holden of The New York Times wrote, "Without standing on a soapbox Stephanie Daley suggests a tragic gender gap between men who judge and women who feel." In 2021, Richard Brody of The New Yorker wrote, "Brougher films with a sharp-eyed, vulnerable, yet combative sense of symbolism that nonetheless sticks close to the drama's physical specifics."

The performances of Tamblyn and Swinton were uniformly praised, with Kenneth Turan of the Los Angeles Times writing, "To see Tamblyn's work here, to see her character almost simultaneously embody pain, terror, anguish, embarrassment, regret and just about any emotion you can think of, is to watch the kind of acting the medium exists to provide." Of Swinton, Roger Ebert wrote "few actors can be more quiet, empathetically tactful."

While some critics felt Lydie's plot line was unnecessary, with Richard Brody saying that the parallels between her storyline and Stephanie's felt "overly coincidental" and have a "superficial obviousness", Joe Morgenstern of The Wall Street Journal said the film successfully "brings together two women, trapped in separate states of denial and distress, who manage to end each other's entrapment." Turan argued "Lydie and her story become an increasingly effective counterweight to Stephanie's tale as both women, in spheres different and alike, must come to terms with actions taken in the past. Neither woman's experience, finally, would be as effective on screen without the other's, but together they come fully alive."

In a review that awarded the film 3 and 1/2 stars out of 4, Ebert wrote, "We read about cases like this and think the mothers are monsters. If their babies are alive and found in a trash bin, certainly they exist outside decency and morality, or their values are corrupted. But what led them to that decision? What did they know? What were they taught? What did they fear? I feel it is the responsibility of parents to raise children who know they can tell their parents anything, and go to them for help. If a girl cannot tell her parents she is pregnant, something bad is likely to happen."

He noted the audience members at the screening he attended were unhappy with the ending, but he applauded Brougher for "the courage and integrity to refuse an easy conclusion," reasoning "What would a satisfactory ending be? Guilty? Innocent? Forensic revelations? We have been tutored by Hollywood to expect all the threads to be tied neatly at the end. But real life is more like this movie: Frightened and confused people are confronted with a situation they cannot understand, and those who would help them are powerless."

=== Awards and nominations ===
Award	Category	Nominee	Result	Ref.
Deauville American Film Festival	Grand Special Prize	Hilary Brougher	Nominated	
Independent Spirit Awards	Best Supporting Female	Amber Tamblyn	Nominated	
Jackson Hole Film Festival	Best Director	Hilary Brougher	Won	
Locarno Film Festival	Best Actress	Amber Tamblyn	Won	
Locarno Film Festival	Best Film	Hilary Brougher	Nominated	
Milano Film Festival	Best Director	Hilary Brougher	Won	
Satellite Awards	Best Actress in a Motion Picture, Drama	Tilda Swinton	Nominated	
Sundance Film Festival	Waldo Salt Screenwriting Award	Hilary Brougher	Won	
Sundance Film Festival	Grand Jury Prize	Hilary Brougher	Nominated	
Woodstock Film Festival	Haskell Wexler Award	David Rush Morrison	Won	

== Home media ==
Stephanie Daley was released on DVD by Liberation Entertainment on September 4, 2007.
