= Dillon Freasier =

American actor (born 1996)

- Born: March 6, 1996 (age 29); San Angelo, Texas, U.S.
- Occupation: Actor
- Years active: 2007
- Known for: There Will Be Blood

Dillon Freasier (born March 6, 1996) is an American former actor. His only film role was in the 2007 film There Will Be Blood.

== Career ==
Freasier was not an actor when chosen for his role in There Will Be Blood. After several failed attempts of casting other actors, Cassandra Kulukundis searched for potential actors in rural schools near Marfa, Texas, the film's primary filming location. At the Fort Davis school with "maybe eight boys of the right age", Freasier was singled out by his principal. Kulukundis said that "he just stayed in my mind, so I called his mother at home and asked if it was all right if I could come over that night". While racing to another school to see more boys, Kulukundis was pulled over by a traffic cop, who happened to be Freasier's mother, and was let off with a warning.

According to The New York Times, Paul Thomas Anderson "really wanted a kid who'd grown up around ranches and horses rather than someone coming in and trying to fake that".

Christy Lemire, the film critic for the Associated Press, praised Freasier as a "confident newcomer", and the Los Angeles Times labeled him "a budding star". In a film review published in Christianity Today, political philosopher Jean Bethke Elshtain called Freasier's performance "astonishing". During his Academy Award acceptance speech for Best Actor, Daniel Day-Lewis said "I wish my son and my partner H.W. Plainview were up here with me, the mighty Dillon Freasier". Freasier, who had decided to skip the Oscars, was asleep at the time. He was nominated for a Young Artist Award in 2007 for his role in the film.

== Personal life ==
In January 2007, Freasier moved to Albany, Texas with his family, where he attended Albany High School and played football. A rodeo enthusiast, he competed in horse roping and won numerous medals for ranching skills.

== Filmography ==
Year	Title	Role	Notes
2007	There Will Be Blood	H.W. Plainview	
