= Phumulani Ntuli =

South African multidisciplinary artist (born 1968)

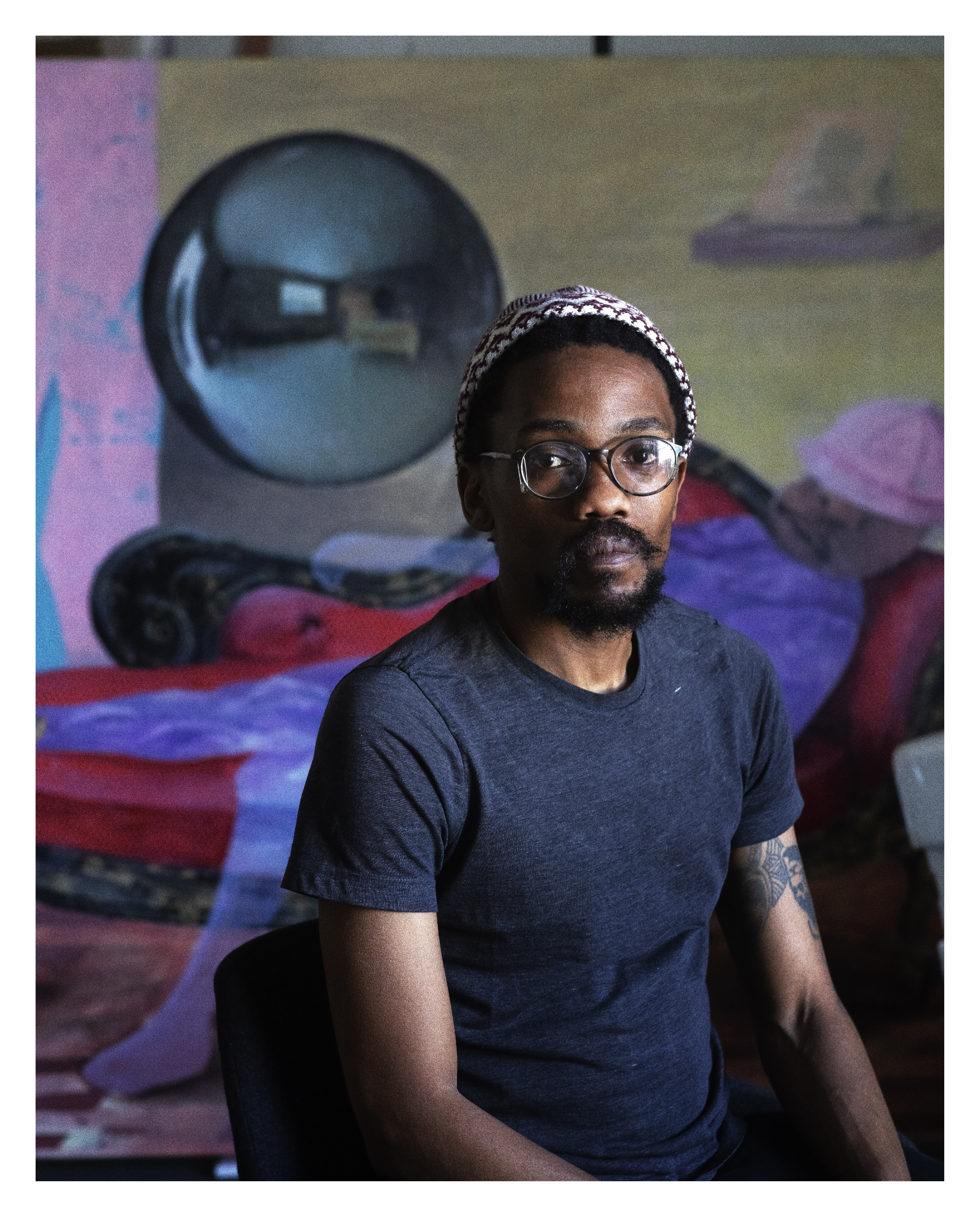
- Phumulani Ntuli, picture by Thys Dullaart
- Born: 18 May 1986 (age 39); Soweto
- Citizenship: South Africa
- Occupation: Artist
- Years active: 2013–present

Phumulani Ntuli (born 1986) is a South African multidisciplinary artist working with mixed media collages, sculpture, video installation and artistic research.

== Life ==
Phumulani Ntuli was born in Soweto, Johannesburg. He obtained a Bachelor of Technology in Fine Arts from the University of Johannesburg in 2013. Between 2015 and 2017 he studied at EDHEA (Valais School of Art) in Switzerland, graduating with a Master in Arts. His thesis was titled When we down tools we exit through the pinhole, which explores the pauses of archives within the Marikana Archive in South Africa. Phumulani Ntuli lives and works in Johannesburg.

== Work ==
Working between documentary and fiction, Ntuli's practice deals with omissions within archives. As he explains in an interview with SOUTH SOUTH: "The continued themes I have explored in my practice have been notions of black futurity, the archive and its tensions. I consistently delve within notions of collective autobiographies and their surrounding social political conditions."

Using an old-fashioned printing press, large mixed media collages were created in collaboration with Kim-Lee Loggenberg at the David Krut Workshop in Johannesburg, entitled Kunanela iphuzu emafini / Echoes of the Point Cloud. The works were presented at FNB Joburg Art Fair in 2023. Based on mixed media and acrylic paint, the works interrogate the visual grammar of popular culture and contemporary digital AI creations, using collage as a means "to process information, through cutting, slicing, joining, displacing, and concealing. It is a performative model of practice to counterfeit, in this gesture creating alternative forms of looking and meaning." The work was expanded in the video artwork Cloud Migration which speaks back to South African landscape traditions and aims to explore "landscape canon from black perspectives, and seeking to recover or point to the "something lost" in the canon's rendition of SA landscapes". Told as counter-narrative, the viewer is invited to imagine a new past, supported by the strategic subversion by "countering western landscape traditions by subverting the naturalism, pictorial unity and perspectival conventions canonical artworks rely on in various ways, and making use of indigenous visual grammars and vocabularies along with iconography that evokes pre-colonial relationships between people and the land."

In 2022, his work was selected to be part of the South African Pavilion for the 59th Venice Biennale. The exhibition, which also included works by Roger Ballen and Lebohang Kganye was entitled Into the Light and curated by South African curator Amé Bell. Ntuli explains that the works presented in Venice "speak to the themes of the exhibition framed within the reflections and refraction of light experienced through a screen – this points to the contemporary representation of filters prevalent within social media and image-making technologies." In the same year, and after a residency with Atelier Solar, Ntuli opened his first solo exhibition in Spain, entitled Isidleke Sakhiwa Ngezinwele [A Nest is Built with Strands of Hair] at Galería Nueva in Madrid.

In 2021, he presented a solo show at the Bag Factory Artists' Studios in Fordsburg, Johannesburg, under the title A Navigation Guide to Kwanqingetshe.

Previously, Ntuli's work has been shown as part of the second edition of the Congo Biennale 2019 in Kinshasa in the Democratic Republic of the Congo and in the Kampala Art Biennale curated by Elise Atangana in 2016.

Ntuli has also presented and/or contributed work within the context of the 2016 Bone Performance Festival in Bern Switzerland, curated by Valerian Maly and also performed in the 2016 Act Festival in Geneva, Basel, Sierre and Zurich. During the aforementioned year, Ntuli participated in residencies/workshops at the Fondazione Pistoletto in Biella, Italy and the Alps Art Academy in Chur, Switzerland.

== Awards and honours ==
In December 2021, as part of his collective practice with Preempt Group (Phumulani Ntuli and Mbali Dhlamini) he received the Tim Hetherington Visionary Award from the Javett Art Centre at the University of Pretoria under the auspices of the Tim Hetherington Trust. In 2023 Preempt Group also received a production grant award from the Sharjah Art Foundation. In December 2021, as part of his collective practice with Preempt Group (with Mbali Dhlamini) he received the Tim Hetherington Visionary Award from the Javett Art Centre at the University of Pretoria under the auspices of the Tim Hetherington Trust. In 2018, he received the PPC Imaginarium Film Prize for his work Tied Rope. In 2010 Ntuli received an award for the CITY Festival in Johannesburg and was awarded the Prix Excellence HES·SO for his Master thesis and artwork.
