= Lyra (film) =

2022 British film

- Directed by: Alison Millar
- Produced by: Alison Millar; Jackie Doyle
- Edited by: Chloe Lambourne
- Release date: 2022
- Running time: 92 minutes
- Country: United Kingdom
- Language: English

Lyra is a 2022 British film directed by Alison Millar about the life and death of murdered Northern Irish author and journalist Lyra McKee. The film repurposes voice recordings and interviews from McKee's dictaphone, as well as uses text messages, home movie footage and other archives. Lyra premiered on 7 November 2021 at Cork International Film Festival simultaneously with a private screening for family and friends during the Belfast Film Festival.

The film won the Tim Hetherington award at Sheffield DocFest and the Audience Award at the Cork International Film Festival.

== Reception ==
Peter Bradshaw in The Guardian gave the film 5/5 stars, writing: "The film gives a vivid and heartfelt portrait of this remarkable young woman, hearing from her family and her partner, with whom she first bonded over their love of Harry Potter. The film ends by pointing out that her funeral, which by general acclaim had become a virtual state occasion, was the first time the major politicians had met since the collapse of power sharing, and expresses the hope that her memory might be instrumental in restarting dialogue. Let’s hope so."

Declan Burke wrote in the Irish Examiner: "Alison Millar refuses to sentimentalise Lyra and her mission statement of ‘disrupting the status quo and fixing what’s wrong’: instead she simply allows Lyra to speak for herself, and the result is one of the saddest and simultaneously uplifting films of the year."

Donald Clarke wrote in The Irish Times: "Alison Millar’s excellent documentary, winner of the audience award at last year’s Cork Film Festival, places McKee’s death in historical context, but it is most valuable for fleshing out the extraordinary human being herself."
