= Kel O'Neill =

American film director

Kel O’Neill is an American film director, artist, and actor. He is one half of the filmmaking duo Jongsma + O’Neill alongside Eline Jongsma.

== Life and career ==
Kel O’Neill grew up in Andover, Massachusetts. Both of his parents were officers in the U.S. Army and met while serving together in Vietnam.

O’Neill made his acting debut in 2002’s XX/XY, directed by Austin Chick and starring Mark Ruffalo and Kathleen Robertson. He later played roles in Easier With Practice, Stephanie Daley, and Brian De Palma’s 2007 war drama Redacted. In 2007 he was hired to play the character of Eli Sunday in Paul Thomas Anderson’s There Will Be Blood, but was fired two weeks in production and replaced by Paul Dano. Of this experience and director Paul Thomas Anderson, O’Neill says “If he hadn’t fired me from There Will Be Blood I would probably still be an actor dreaming of making my own films someday.”

While still an actor, O’Neill began working with Eline Jongsma, with whom he first collaborated in 2006 at an artist residency in Prishtina, Kosovo. In 2009, Jongsma + O’Neill began production on Empire, a series of non-fiction video installations on the remnants of Dutch colonialism. The project had its premiere at The International Documentary Film Festival Amsterdam in 2012 and its US premiere at the New York Film Festival in 2013. Empire was adapted to the web in collaboration with POV, and this adaptation was nominated for a News and Documentary Emmy in the category New Approaches: Documentary Film. O’Neill and Jongsma wrote about their experiences filming Empire in Suriname’s gold mines for VICE.

In 2015, O’Neill and Eline Jongsma won the Tim Hetherington Trust Award, which they used to help produce their follow-up to Empire, The Ark, a VR documentary about the fight to save the Northern White Rhino from extinction. Shot in California and Africa, the project focuses on parallel stories: scientists in San Diego attempting in vitro fertilization to revive the species—of which only three remain—and workers on Kenya’s Ol Pejeta Conservancy guarding the remaining rhinos from poachers. The Ark had its world premiere at the 2016 Tribeca Film Festival in the Storyscapes section.

O’Neill and Jongsma’s other work includes Exit: A Mobile Guide To The Apocalypse, which was an Official Selection in the Future of Entertainment section of SXSW 2016.

== Filmography [director] ==
- The Ark [2016] [co-director, with Eline Jongsma]
- The Empire Project (2012) [co-director, with Eline Jongsma]
- De transformatie van Genesis P-Orridge (2008) [co-director, with Eline Jongsma]
