= Easier with Practice =

2009 film by Kyle Patrick Alvarez

- Theatrical release poster
- Directed by: Kyle Patrick Alvarez
- Screenplay by: Kyle Patrick Alvarez
- Based on: "What Are You Wearing?" by Davy Rothbart
- Produced by: Cookie Carosella; David Melito
- Starring: Brian Geraghty; Kel O'Neill; Marguerite Moreau; Jeanette Brox; Jenna Gavigan
- Cinematography: David Rush Morrison
- Edited by: Fernando Collins
- Production company: Forty Second Productions
- Distributed by: Lantern Lane Entertainment
- Release dates: June 12, 2009 (CineVegas); February 26, 2010 (United States)
- Running time: 100 minutes
- Country: United States
- Language: English

Easier with Practice is a 2009 American drama film written and directed by Kyle Patrick Alvarez. It stars Brian Geraghty, Kel O'Neill, Marguerite Moreau, Jeanette Brox, and Jenna Gavigan. The story is based on the 2006 GQ article "What Are You Wearing?" by Davy Rothbart.

The film was nominated for an Independent Spirit Award for Best First Feature and won the Someone to Watch Award for Alvarez.

== Plot ==
Davy Mitchell is an introverted writer struggling on tour to promote his unpublished short stories. His lonely nights heat up when Davy receives a seemingly random phone call from a woman named Nicole. The sultry stranger seduces him into an intense session of phone sex, sparking an erotic and intimate relationship that is based entirely around the phone calls that she initiates. Davy wants to make it work, but he becomes frustrated when she refuses to give out her number. Fed up with her games, he determines to meet Nicole in person. That is, if she ever calls again.

== Cast ==
- Brian Geraghty as Davy Mitchell
- Kel O'Neill as Sean Mitchell
- Marguerite Moreau as Samantha
- Jeanette Brox as Sarah
- Jenna Gavigan as Josie
- Katie Aselton as Nicole

== Production ==
Director Kyle Patrick Alvarez was inspired by Davy Rothbart's autobiographical article "What Are You Wearing?" in the August 2006 issue of GQ magazine.

The film was produced by Forty Second Productions with a Red One camera system. Principal photography began in April 2008 and concluded on June 10 of that year, after 20 days of filming. Filming took place in Albuquerque, New Mexico, primarily in a motel.

== Release ==
Easier with Practice had its world premiere at the CineVegas film festival, where it won the 2009 Grand Jury Prize. Its international premiere was at the Edinburgh International Film Festival, where it garnered Best New International Feature. The film was released theatrically in New York City and Los Angeles on February 26, 2010, by Lantern Lane Entertainment. It was also distributed in Canada by Mongrel Media.

The film was rated NC-17 by the Motion Picture Association of America. Though the film does not feature any nudity, the rating was supposedly given for the graphic sexual dialogue.

=== Home media ===
The film was released on DVD by Breaking Glass Pictures on April 6, 2010.

== Reception ==
On the review aggregate website Rotten Tomatoes, Easier with Practice holds an approval rating of 88% based on 34 reviews, with an average rating of 7.1/10. The website's critics consensus reads, "This promising debut from writer-director Kyle Patrick Alvarez is anchored by a startlingly honest and tender performance from Brian Geraghty that helps make Easier with Practice more than just another road trip drama." Metacritic, which uses a weighted average, assigned the film a score of 72 out of 100, based on 8 critics, indicating "generally favorable" reviews.

Justin Chang of Variety called it "a quietly provocative love story about emotionally stunted manhood and the risks some guys will take to connect." Scott Tobias of The A.V. Club wrote, "Love stories don't come much squirmier than this one, and Alvarez plays it with honesty, insight, and the awkwardness inherent in this blindest of blind dates." Peter Bradshaw of The Guardian said, "The film is a slow-burner: a study in loneliness and alienation, whose unexpected ending and ambiguous aftermath require us to reassess all that has gone before."

== Awards ==
- 2010 Independent Spirit Awards
  - Best First Feature – nominated
  - Someone to Watch Award – Kyle Patrick Alvarez, winner
- 2009 CineVegas International Film Festival – Grand Jury Award, winner
- 2009 Edinburgh International Film Festival – Best New International Feature, winner
- 2009 Memphis Indie Film Festival – Special Jury Prize, winner
