= David Rush Morrison =

American cinematographer

- Born: Virginia, US
- Occupation: Cinematographer
- Website: www.davidrmorrison.com

David Rush Morrison is an American cinematographer best known for his work on Stephanie Daley, Touchback, Easier with Practice, and Girl Rising.

== Career ==
Morrison studied at the Savannah College of Art and Design. Upon graduation, he moved to Los Angeles to pursue his love of filmmaking. He has worked as a cinematographer on music videos for Beck, Regina Spektor, Angels and Airwaves, Robbie Williams, and The Like. Morrison has also acted as a cinematographer on various commercials for brands such as Microsoft, Google, and Adidas. In 2006, he won the Haskell Wexler Award at the Woodstock Film Festival for his work on Stephanie Daley, a feature film starring Tilda Swinton, Amber Tamblyn, and Timothy Hutton.
