= D. G. Scofield =

American businessman

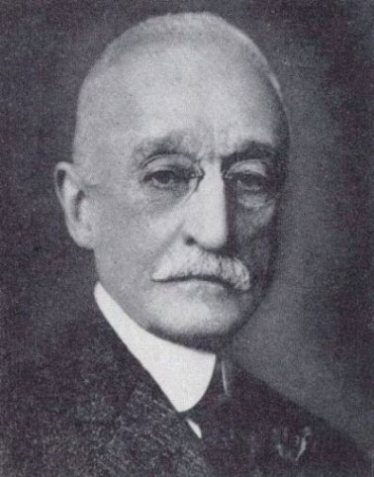
D. G. Scofield

Demetrius Gustavus Scofield (January 28, 1843 – July 31, 1917) was a pioneer of the oil business in California who founded a number of companies in that state and became the first president of Standard Oil of California.

He served as secretary to the now-defunct F.W. Mitchell Oil Company of Pennsylvania during the Titusville oil boom and arrived in California in about 1875, as the Pico Canyon Oilfield was being developed. By 1876, he was the manager of the small refinery of the California Star Oil Works, which was capable of refining up to 40 barrels (6.4 m^{3}) of oil a day. The facility, located at Lyon Station in Los Angeles County was the first refinery in California. It is now abandoned but may be restored as an historical site. Scofield hired oil well driller Charles Alexander Mentry (1847-1900) and financing oil well of the Pico Canyon Oilfield.

By 1879 he was a key employee of the Pacific Coast Oil Company responsible for bringing other skilled workers to California. In that year, the Pacific Coast Oil Company completed a five-mile (8 km) long, 2-inch-diameter (51 mm) pipeline from Pico Canyon to a new refinery near Newhall.

In 1906, Pacific Coast Oil Company was acquired by Standard Oil. With the 1911 breakup of that corporation, Scofield became president of the new Standard Oil of California.

The Associated Press reported that on July 30 1917, he shot and killed himself at his home. He was 74 and despondent over his wife's death five years before.

He was the namesake of the oil tanker, the MS D. G. Scofield which was, on 1 May 1939, the first oil tanker to load oil in Saudi Arabia.
