= Kiana Hayeri =

Canadian photojournalist

Kiana Hayeri (born in 1988) is an Iranian-Canadian photojournalist. She has received the Tim Hetherington Visionary Award (2020), the James Foley Award for Conflict Reporting (2020), the Robert Capa Gold Medal (2021), and the Leica Oskar Barnack Award (2022), the Carmignac Photojournalism Award (2024), and the World Press Photo Prize (2025 and 2026). She was part of The New York Times team that won The Hal Boyle Award (2022) and was shortlisted for the Pulitzer Prize in International Reporting in the same year.

== Life and work ==
Kiana grew up in Tehran, Iran, and moved to Toronto as a teenager. She took up photography to bridge cultural and linguistic gaps. In 2014, she moved to Kabul and lived there for nearly a decade. Her work often explores migration, adolescence, identity, and sexuality in conflict zones. She is considered part of a new generation of conflict photojournalists who focus less on battlefield imagery and more on human, gendered, and social consequences of war, especially through long-term embedded storytelling.

She has published two photobooks, “When Cages Fly” (2024) and “No Woman’s Land” (2025). “When Cages Fly” was shortlisted for Rencontres d’Arles Author Book Award, IPA Photobook Awards, a finalist for Lucie Photobook Award and APhF Pick:24 Book Award and the winner of The Photography Book of the Year by POY (Picture Of the Year).

Kiana is a TED fellow, a National Geographic Explorer grantee, and a regular contributor to The New York Times. She is currently based in Sarajevo, covering stories from Afghanistan, Syria, the Balkans, and beyond.

== Awards ==
- 2020: Robert Capa Gold Medal, from the Overseas Press Club of America
- 2020: Tim Hetherington Visionary Award from the Tim Hetherington Trust. A £20,000 grant for Promises Written On The Ice, Left In The Sun.
- 2020: James Foley Award for Conflict Reporting, Online Journalism Awards from the Online News Association
- 2022: Leica Oskar Barnack Award
- 2024: 14th edition of the Carmignac Foundation Photojournalism Award for No Woman's Land, with journalist Mélissa Cornet
- 2026: Inaugural Sir Harry Evans Global Fellow in Photojournalism].
