= Lyons Station Stagecoach Stop =

Historical site in Newhall, Santa Clarita, California

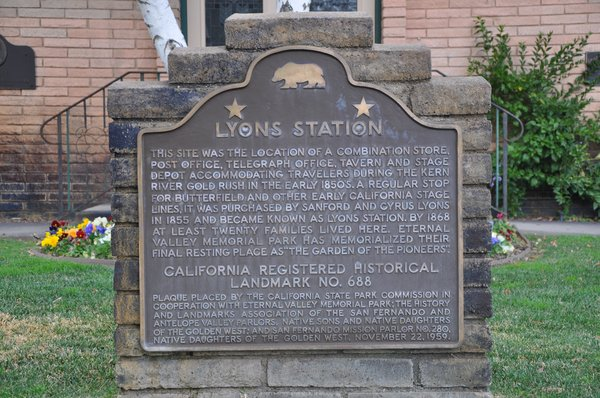

- Location in Santa Clarita
- 34.36270°N 118.50740°W
- Location: 23287 Sierra Highway; Santa Clarita, California 91321

California Historical Landmark
- Reference no.: 688

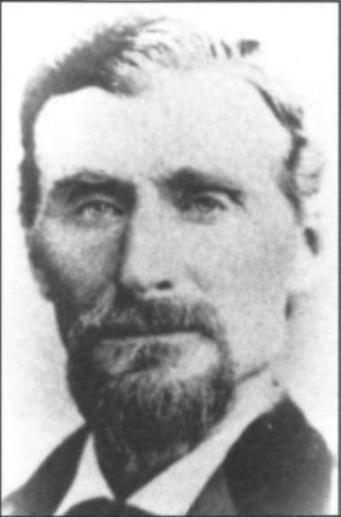
Sanford Lyon (Nov. 20, 1831 - Nov. 30, 1882)

The Lyons Station Stagecoach Stop (originally Hart's Station, then Wiley's Station) was a tavern and stagecoach stop near the southwest corner of Newhall Avenue and Sierra Highway, by Eternal Valley Cemetery. The site is located in the present day Newhall section of Santa Clarita, in Los Angeles County, California.

== History ==
The original Hart's Station house was just north over the San Fernando Pass on the Fort Tejon Road, north of the San Fernando Mission. The wagon road connected Los Angeles and the Gold Rush locations in the Sierras, and was part of the inland route to Sacramento and the San Francisco Bay Area. It was a regular stop for several early California stagecoach lines, and accommodated travelers during the 1853 Kern River gold rush.

=== Lyons' Station ===
Wiley's Station was purchased by Sanford and Cyrus Lyon in 1855, and it was renamed Lyons' Station. The Lyon brothers owned the adobe and ranch land around it, where they farmed, raised sheep, and ran the watering place stop. Despite being named Lyons' Station by the Lyon brothers as owners, it was still referred to by its original name of Hart's Station in Daily Alta California news accounts of the first trip over the route in 1858. The sixth was Willow Springs Station, in the Temecula Valley.

In his book Sixty Years in Southern California, Harris Newmark writes about his visit to the station in 1856:

We left Los Angeles early one afternoon, and made our first stop at Lyons's Station, where we put up for the night. One of the brothers [Sanford], after whom the place was named, prepared supper. Having to draw some thick blackstrap from a keg, he used a pitcher to catch the treacle; and as the liquid ran very slowly, our sociable host sat down to talk a bit, and soon forgot all about what he had started to do. The molasses, however, although it ran pretty slowly, ran steadily, and finally, like the mush in the fairy-tale of the enchanted bowl, overflowed the top of the receptacle and spread itself over the dirt floor. When Lyons had finished his chat, he saw, to his intense chagrin, a new job upon his hands, and one likely to busy him for some time.

Over the years Lyons' Station became a combination stagecoach stop, general store, and post office, with a telegraph office added after the telegraph line came to Los Angeles in 1861. By 1860 at least twenty families lived in the surrounding settlement.

=== Petroleopolis ===
Starting around 1867, Lyons Station came to be called Petroleopolis, as Sanford Lyon became involved in the early oil industry. A Petroleopolis Post Office operated from 1867 to 1871. Sanford Lyon was appointed its postmaster on July 23, 1869.

In 1874, the Los Angeles Petroleum Refinery Company built an oil refinery at Lyons Station. On September 6, 1876, the Southern Pacific Railroad line was opened between Los Angeles and Northern California, passing Petroleopolis via Newhall Pass. The railway also linked Southern California to the eastern U.S. via the transcontinental railroad in the north. The refinery at Lyons' Station was unsuccessful and shut down in 1875, and in 1877 the parts were moved about a mile westward to Andrews Station directly on the railroad line, where a larger refinery was being built.

== California Historical Marker ==
The site of Lyons Station is marked by California Historical Landmark NO. 688, sited in front of the Eternal Valley Memorial Park at 23287 North Sierra Highway in Newhall, near California State Route 14 and Newhall Avenue. The marker reads:

- NO. 688 LYONS STATION STAGECOACH STOP - This site was the location of a combination store, post office, telegraph office, tavern, and stage depot accommodating travelers during the Kern River gold rush in the early 1850s. A regular stop for Butterfield and other early California stage lines, it was purchased by Sanford and Cyrus Lyons in 1855, and by 1868 at least twenty families lived here. Eternal Valley Memorial Park has called their final resting place "The Garden of the Pioneers".

== See also ==
- Butterfield Overland Mail in California
- Rancho San Francisco — colonial Mexican California land grant
- D. G. Scofield, a pioneer of the oil business in California; oil found near Lyons' Station.
