= Pico Canyon Oilfield =

Site in Los Angeles County, California

- Well No. 4, Pico Canyon Oil Field
- U.S. National Register of Historic Places
- U.S. National Historic Landmark
- California Historical Landmark No. 516
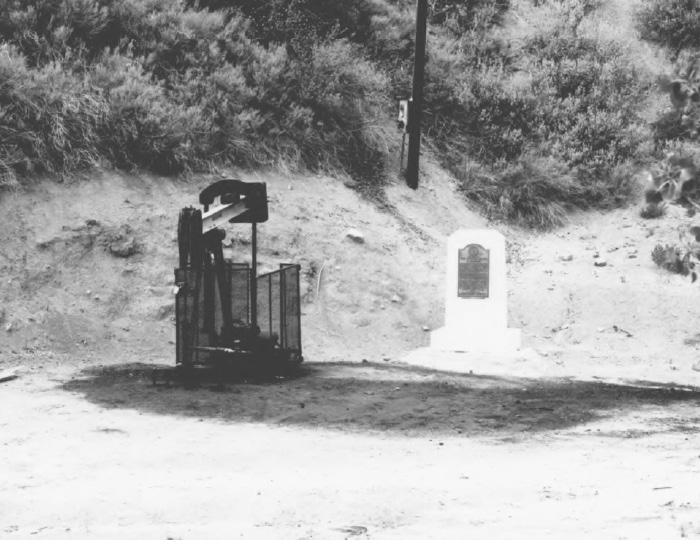
- Well Number 4 in 1961, Pico Canyon Oil Field

- Location within the Los Angeles metropolitan area Location within California Location within the United States
- Nearest city: Newhall, California
- Coordinates: 34°22′10″N 118°37′49″W
- Area: 850 acres (340 ha)
- Built: 1876
- NRHP reference No.: 66000212
- CHISL No.: 516

Significant dates
- Added to NRHP: November 13, 1966
- Designated NHL: November 13, 1966

Well No. 4, Pico Canyon Oilfield, located about seven miles (11 km) west of Newhall, California, in the Santa Susana Mountains, was the first commercially successful oil well in the Western United States and is considered the birthplace of California's oil industry. Drilled in 1876, it turned nearby Newhall into a boomtown and also spawned a smaller boomtown called Mentryville adjacent to the drilling site. Well No. 4 continued in operation for 114 years until it was capped in 1990. The site was designated a National Historic Landmark in 1966, and the Mentryville ghost town is now open to the public as a historic park.

== Early history of oil drilling in California ==
Following the oil strike at Drake Oil Well in Pennsylvania in 1859, there was a short-lived oil drilling boom in California, but this was wiped out in 1867 when eastern oil could be sold cheaper. At the end of the first boom, 75 companies had drilled 60 wells in California, spending $1 million to produce $60,000 worth of oil.

== Discoveries of oil in Pico Canyon ==
Oil seep locations in present-day Pico Canyon area of the northern Santa Susana Mountains were known and used for centuries by the local Tataviam and Tongva Native Americans for medicinal and healing purposes. Various accounts exist about the Spanish-Mexican era rediscovery by non-indigenous people of oil in Pico Canyon. Some accounts credit Andrés Pico with discovering oil there in the 1850s, but the Los Angeles Times reported in 1882 as follows:

The Pico Oil Spring was discovered in January, 1865, by Ramon Peria, a Mexican hunter. One day while hunting for deer he wounded a buck. He followed the trail and found it dead near the spring. The quality of the oil in the spring attracted his attention, being of a dark, green color and very thin, and so different from anything that he had ever seen, that he concluded it must be valuable. So he notified a friend of his, Jesus Hernandez, and they located the oil claim.

According to a later account, Peria gathered some of the oil in his canteen and brought it to others who recognized its value. Yet another account indicates that Perea brought a small amount of the curious substance to the Mission San Fernando, where a Dr. Gelsich recognized it as petroleum and at once formed a company to stake out claims. Peria was granted an ownership interest in an oil company for making the discovery, but he reportedly traded his interest in the company for a barrel of spirits and a $20 gold piece. After the discovery, claims were staked out, but it was not until almost five years later that the first well was struck and later still before the first commercial success.

== Well No. 4 ==
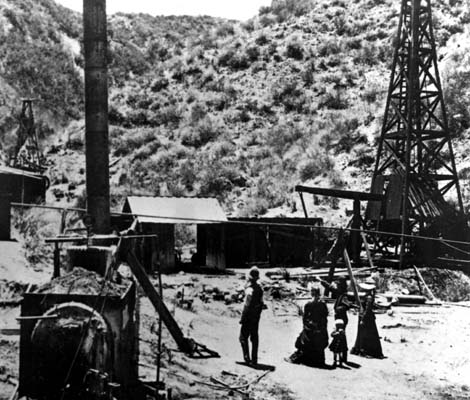
Well #4 in 1877, photograph taken by Carleton Watkins. (source: Los Angeles Public Library Photo Collection)

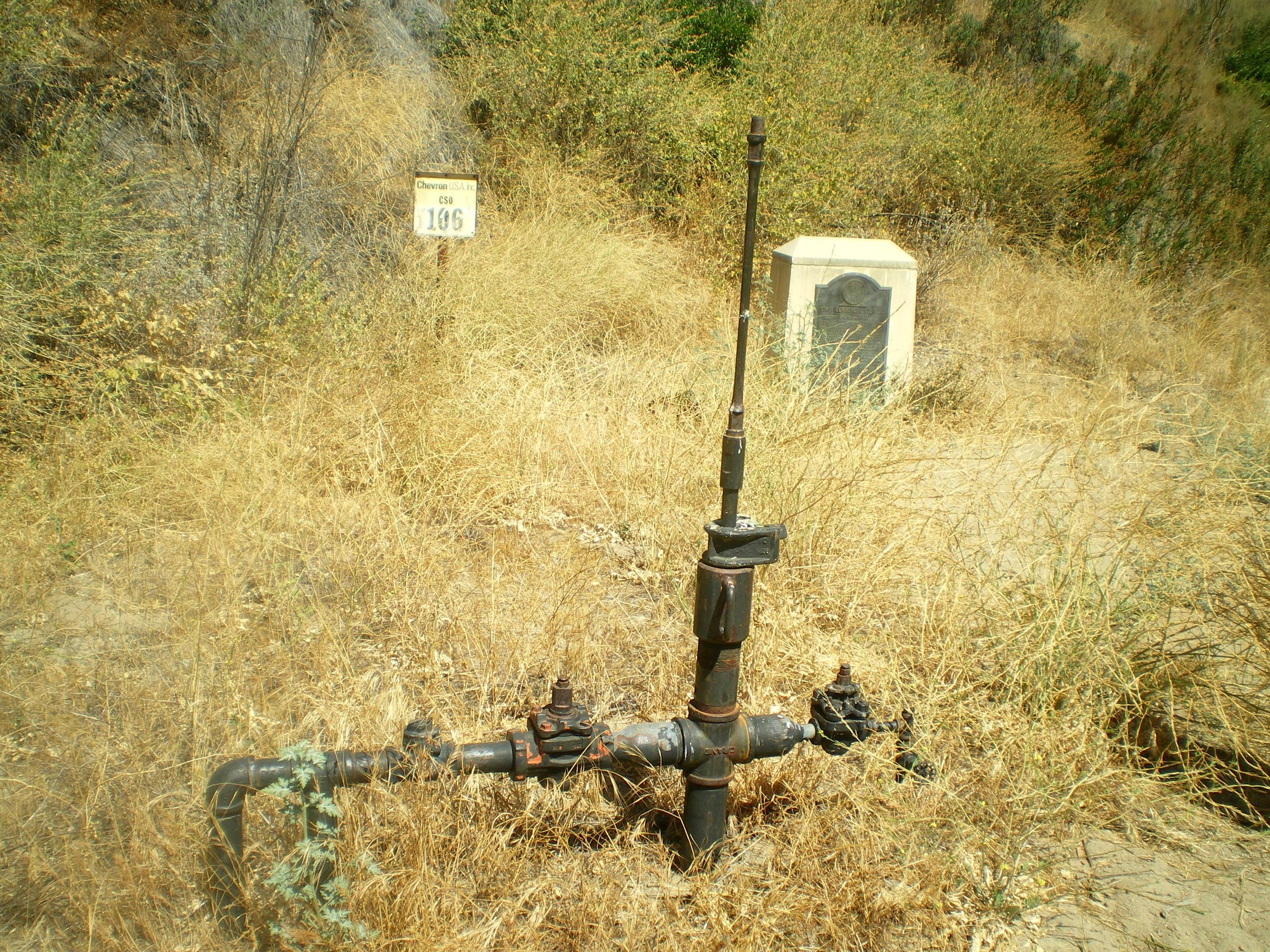
The remains of Well No. 4 and historical marker, in August 2008

In 1875, the Star Oil Works, later reorganized as the California Star Oil Works Company, hired Charles Alexander Mentry (1846–1900) to supervise its drilling operations in Pico Canyon. Mentry was born in France, moved to Pennsylvania at age seven, worked in the Pennsylvania oil fields, and moved to California in 1873.

Mentry drilled three wells in 1875 and 1876 that showed promise, but the "gusher" came with the fourth well. Mentry began drilling Well No. 4 in July 1876 and struck oil on September 26, 1876, at a depth of 370 feet (110 m); the well immediately began producing 25 barrels per day (4.0 m^{3}/d). Well No. 4 was drilled with great difficulty since "the railroad had not then been completed, there was no road into the canyon, water was almost unattainable, and there were no adequate tools or machinery to be had." Mentry used his mechanical skills to create improvised tools, including a drill-stem he built out of old railroad car axles, which he purchased from the Southern Pacific and welded together. When Mentry drilled the well to a depth of 560 feet (170 m) in 1877, the oil spurted to the top of the 65-foot (20 m) derrick, increasing the production to 150 barrels per day (24 m^{3}/d). After Well No. 4 proved to be a success, Mentry constructed the first oil pipeline in California from Pico Canyon to the refinery in Newhall, later extending it 50 miles (80 km) to the ocean at Ventura, California.

Well No. 4 continued producing oil for 114 years before it was finally capped in 1990. It was the longest continually operating oil well in the world. When a reporter from the Los Angeles Times visited the site in 1962, the caretaker's son took the reporter to old Well No. 4, turned the valve and reported: "Still producing after all these years... only about a barrel a week, but look how rich the oil is." Demetrius G. Scofield (c. 1834 – July 31, 1917), also known as D. G. Scofield, was a pioneer of the oil business in California who founded a number of companies in that state and became the first president of Standard Oil of California.

=== Historic designation ===
Well No. 4 was declared a National Historic Landmark in 1966. Along with the Rómulo Pico Adobe in San Fernando, Well No. 4 has the distinction of being the first site in Los Angeles County to be listed on the National Register of Historic Places and one of only two sites in the county to be so designated during the 1960s.

== Oil boom in Pico Canyon ==
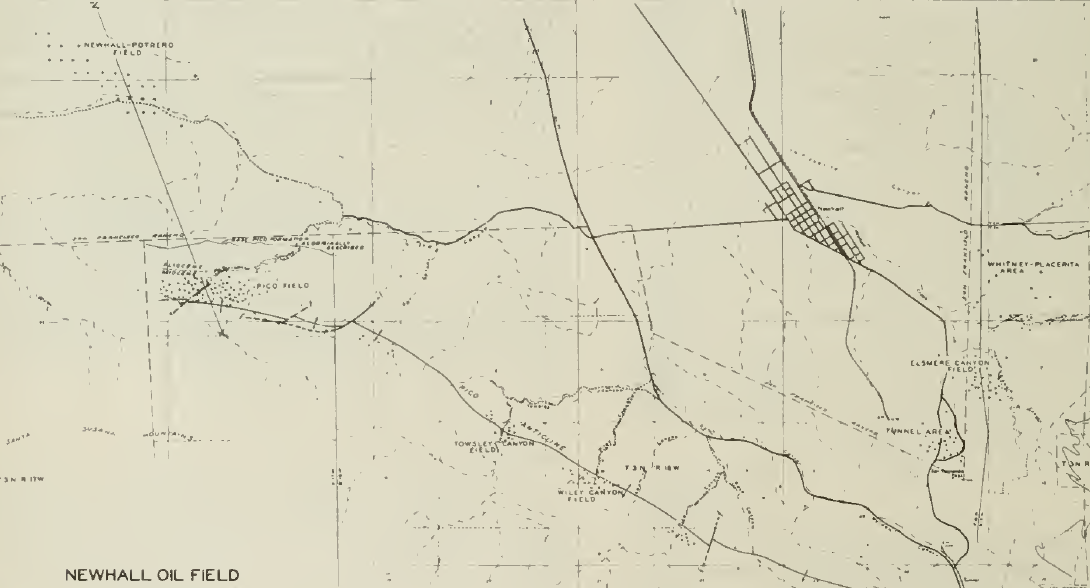
Pico Canyon Oil Fields

The success of Well No. 4 was by far the greatest of any well drilled in California and led to the state's second oil drilling boom. As a result, the state's oil production rose to 568,806 barrels (90,432.9 m^{3}) in 1879, 1,763,215 barrels (280,328.8 m^{3}) in 1880, and 4,194,102 barrels (666,808.9 m^{3}) in 1881.

In 1882, the editor of the fledgling Los Angeles Times traveled on horseback to see the celebrated Pico Canyon oil wells. As he approached the camp, he noted that his horse refused to drink from the canyon's rivulet, which he found was "about half crude oil and half water." The editor described the booming oil region as follows:

There are eight wells now yielding oil, and three more in process of sinking, some in the canyon, some on the hillsides and some on the tops of the peaks, five hundred feet almost perpendicular from base to top... large boilers, heavy machinery, timber, and all the etceteras for oil mining and the comfort of the miners, have been hauled up these almost perpendicular roads... the deepest well on the mountains is a little over 1,500 feet in depth, and none have yet been sank but what have yielded oil in remunerative quantities. A 2-inch iron pipe, about seven miles (11 km) long, runs from Pico canyon to the refinery in Newhall, and through this an average of one hundred and seventy barrels of crude oil is sent every twenty-four hours...

By 1883, Pacific Coast Oil Company (which later became Standard Oil of California) had bought out the competition in Pico Canyon and had 30 wells said to be producing 500 barrels per day (79 m^{3}/d). When the Times sent a reporter to do a follow-up story in 1883, he found a camp with its engines being run day and night, employing 80 to 100 men, mostly "robust, healthy young men from the mountain districts of Pennsylvania."

In 1895, a pamphlet issued by the State of California stated that the Pacific Coast Oil Company had 40 wells operating in Pico Canyon producing 500 barrels per day (79 m^{3}/d) and one well that had produced 1,500,000 barrels (240,000 m^{3}).

== Mentryville ==
A boomtown named Mentryville was built a short distance from Well No. 4. The town was named after Charles Alexander Mentry, who lived in the town and served as the superintendent of the Pico Canyon operations until his death in 1900. He reportedly treated the workers at Pico Canyon with dignity, and the operation never suffered a strike. When Mentry died, the entire town of more than 200 persons, except for three individuals left behind in Mentryville, traveled to Los Angeles for his funeral, bringing with them a large floral arrangement in the shape of an oil derrick.

During the 1930s, most of Mentryville's residents left, many tearing down their houses board by board and nail by nail, and taking it all with them. By 1962, Mentryville had become a ghost town, with only a caretaker family living in Mentry's old 13-room house. A visitor to the camp that year reported that "rusted oil equipment cluttered the canyon," toppled derricks lay rotting, and the cemetery was "choked with weeds, hidden and forgotten."

In 1995, Chevron donated the Mentryville site and the surrounding 800 acres (320 ha) in Pico Canyon to the Santa Monica Mountains Conservancy for the Mentryville and Pico Canyon Parks. A group called the Friends of Mentryville was organized to restore the buildings and open the old town as a historic park.

== California Historical Landmark Marker ==
California Historical Landmark Marker No. 516 at the site reads:

NO. 516 WELL, CSO 4 (PICO 4) – On this site stands CSO-4 (Pico No. 4), California's first commercially productive well. It was spudded in early 1876 under direction of Demetrious G. Scofield who later became the first president of Standard Oil Company of California, and was completed at a depth of 300 feet on September 26, 1876, for an initial flow of 30 barrels of oil a day. Later that year, after the well was deepened to 600 feet with what was perhaps the first steam rig employed in oil well drilling in California, it produced at a rate of 150 barrels a day – it is still producing after 77 years (1953). The success of this well prompted formation of the Pacific Coast Oil Company, a predecessor of Standard Oil Company of California, and led to the construction of the state's first refinery nearby. It was not only the discovery well of the Newhall Field, but was a powerful stimulus to the subsequent development of the California petroleum industry.

California Historical Landmark Marker No. 516-2 nearby reads:

NO. 516-2 MENTRYVILLE – Named after pioneer oil developer Charles Alexander Mentry, who in 1876 drilled the first successful oil well in California. His restored home and barn and Felton School remain here where the Star Oil Company, one of the predecessors of Standard Oil of California, was born.

== See also ==
- History of oil in California through 1930
- List of Registered Historic Places in Los Angeles County, California
- Mentryville, California
- Petroleum in California
- Santa Susana Mountains
