= History of oil in California through 1930 =

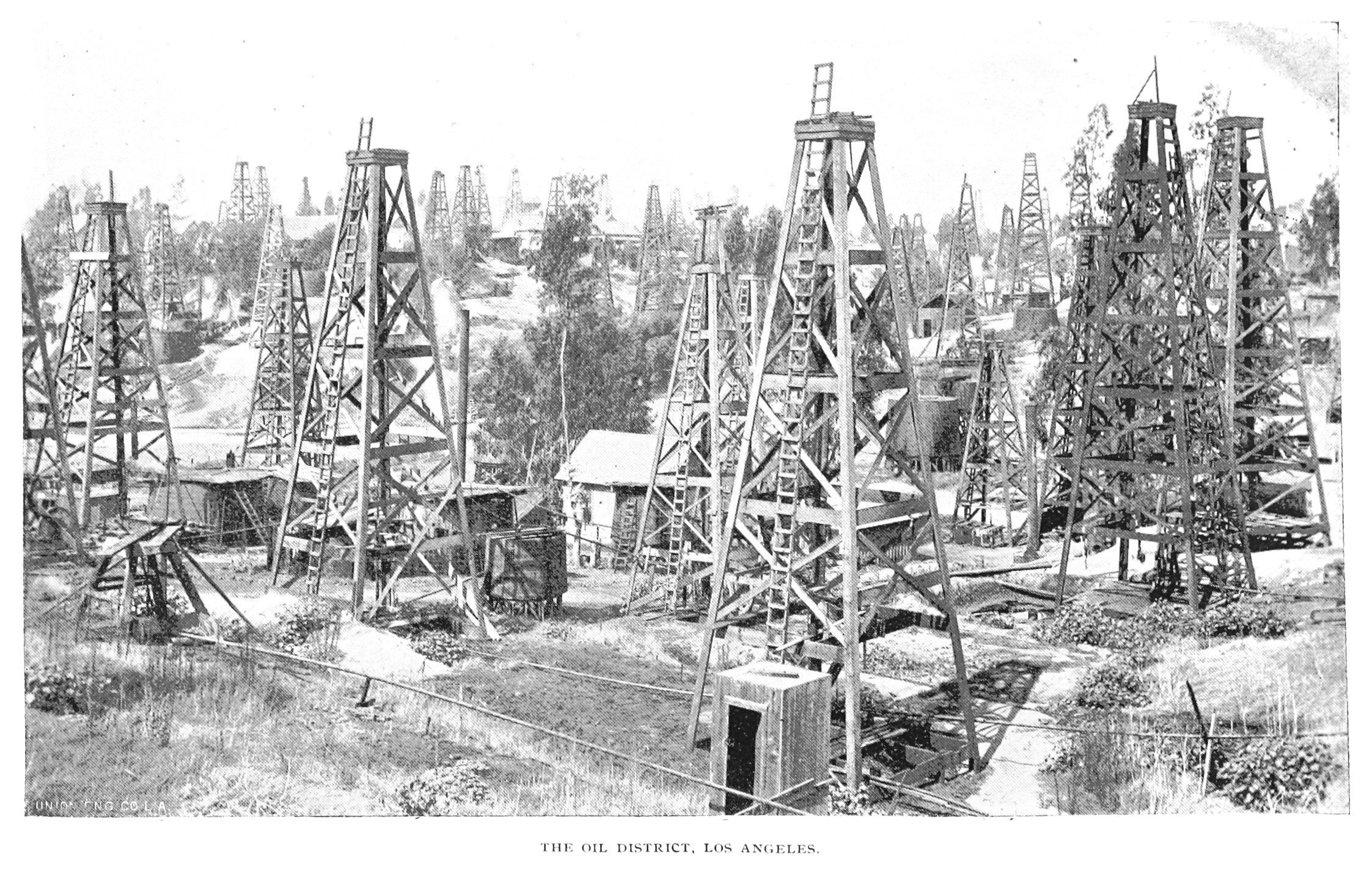
The Los Angeles City Oil Field in 1895

The history of oil production in California began in the late 19th century. In 1903, California became the leading oil-producing state in the US, and traded the number one position back-and forth with Oklahoma through the year 1930. As of 2022, California produced 3% of the crude oil of the nation, behind Texas, New Mexico, North Dakota, Alaska, Colorado, and Oklahoma. In the past century, California's oil industry grew to become the state's number one GDP export and one of the most profitable industries in the region. The history of oil in the state of California, however, dates back much earlier than the 19th century. For thousands of years prior to European settlement in America, Native Americans in the California territory excavated oil seeps. By the mid-19th century, American geologists discovered the vast oil reserves in California and began mass drilling in the Western Territory. While California's production of excavated oil increased significantly during the early 20th century, the accelerated drilling resulted in an overproduction of the commodity, and the federal government unsuccessfully made several attempts to regulate the oil market.

== Oil in pre-Columbian California ==
Native Americans were keenly aware of oil reserves in California, and they relied on its utility for thousands of years, albeit not for energy sources. The most abundant oil seep in the ancient California territory was the La Brea Tar Pits, in present-day Los Angeles. Native Americans used oil from La Brea and other seeps primarily as a lubricant, but they also used it as a sealant to waterproof canoes. When Spanish explorers arrived in California in the 1500s, they also used oil to seal cracks in their ships and the roofs of their homes.

== 19th century ==
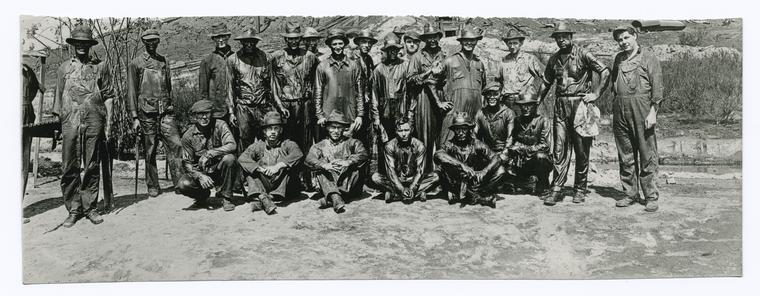
Oil crew in the Coyote Fields, California, undated, circa 1860-1920

In 1865, seven years after Edwin Drake developed the first oil drilling system in North America—located in Pennsylvania—Union Mattole Company started producing oil in the Mattole Valley near Petrolia, California. Union Mattole Company hoped to replicate the success of the Pennsylvania drillings and find large amounts of oil in Northern California. During this period, California's population increased by approximately 375% in the years following the 1849 gold rush, and California's demand for oil was increasing dramatically. However, Union Mattole failed to find sufficient oil supplies. The company could not produce the oil to keep up with consumer demand. As a result, Californians found themselves in desperate need of oil.

In 1866, Thomas Bard and Josiah Stanford (Leland Stanford's brother) produced oil from Sulphur Mountain in the Ojai Basin.

=== Pico Canyon Oilfield ===
Well No. 4 in the Pico Canyon Oilfield, located in the Santa Susana Mountains north of the San Fernando Valley in Southern California, was the first commercially successful oil well in California and the Western United States. The well is on the National Register of Historic Places listings in Los Angeles County.

In 1875, the Star Oil Works, later reorganized as the California Star Oil Works Company, hired Charles Alexander Mentry (1846-1900) to supervise its drilling operations in Pico Canyon, which became the Pico Canyon Oilfield. Mentry drilled three wells in 1875 and 1876 that showed promise, but the "gusher" came with the fourth well. Mentry began drilling Well No. 4 in July 1876 and struck oil on September 26, 1876, at a depth of 370 feet (110 m). The well immediately began producing 25 barrels per day (4.0 m^{3}/d). When Mentry drilled the well to a depth of 560 feet (170 m) in 1877, the oil spurted to the top of the 65-foot (20 m) derrick, increasing the production to 150 barrels per day (24 m^{3}/d). After Well No. 4 proved to be a success, Mentry constructed the first oil pipeline in California from Pico Canyon to the refinery in Newhall, later extending it 50 miles (80 km) to the ocean at Ventura, California. Well No. 4 continued producing oil for 114 years before it was finally capped in 1990.

By 1883, Pacific Coast Oil Company (which later became Standard Oil of California) had bought out the competition in Pico Canyon and had 30 wells said to be producing 500 barrels per day (79 m^{3}/d).

A boomtown named Mentryville was built a short distance from Well No. 4. The town was named after Charles Alexander Mentry, who lived in the town and served as the superintendent of the Pico Canyon operations until his death in 1900.

=== Los Angeles City Oil Field ===
Meanwhile, in 1892, Edward L. Doheny, a gold prospector, and his partner, Charles A. Canfield, discovered an abundance of oil within the Los Angeles City Oil Field and surrounding Los Angeles Basin of Southern California. When word spread about Doheny and Canfield's discoveries, drilling companies flocked to Southern California. By 1894, 80 wells were producing oil in the Los Angeles area; by 1897, the number of wells had bourgeoned to over 500.

=== Oil production and prices ===
The discovery of oil in California had a significant impact on the price of oil—both in the state of California and across America. In 1860, 0.5 million barrels of oil were produced throughout the country. By 1895, the state of California, alone, produced 1.2 million barrels of oil. With the new oil supplies from California—along with increased oil production in Texas and Pennsylvania—the price decreased from $9.60 per barrel in 1860 to $0.25 per barrel in 1895.

American oil companies including Union Oil Company became concerned with this development because oil prices had fallen too low for oil companies to maintain high profit margins. Union Oil Company and other oil companies lobbied local and federal governments to regulate the overproduction in the oil market. Their attempts were futile, however, and no regulation was passed. Oil prices remained around $1 through the end of the 19th century.

== 20th century ==
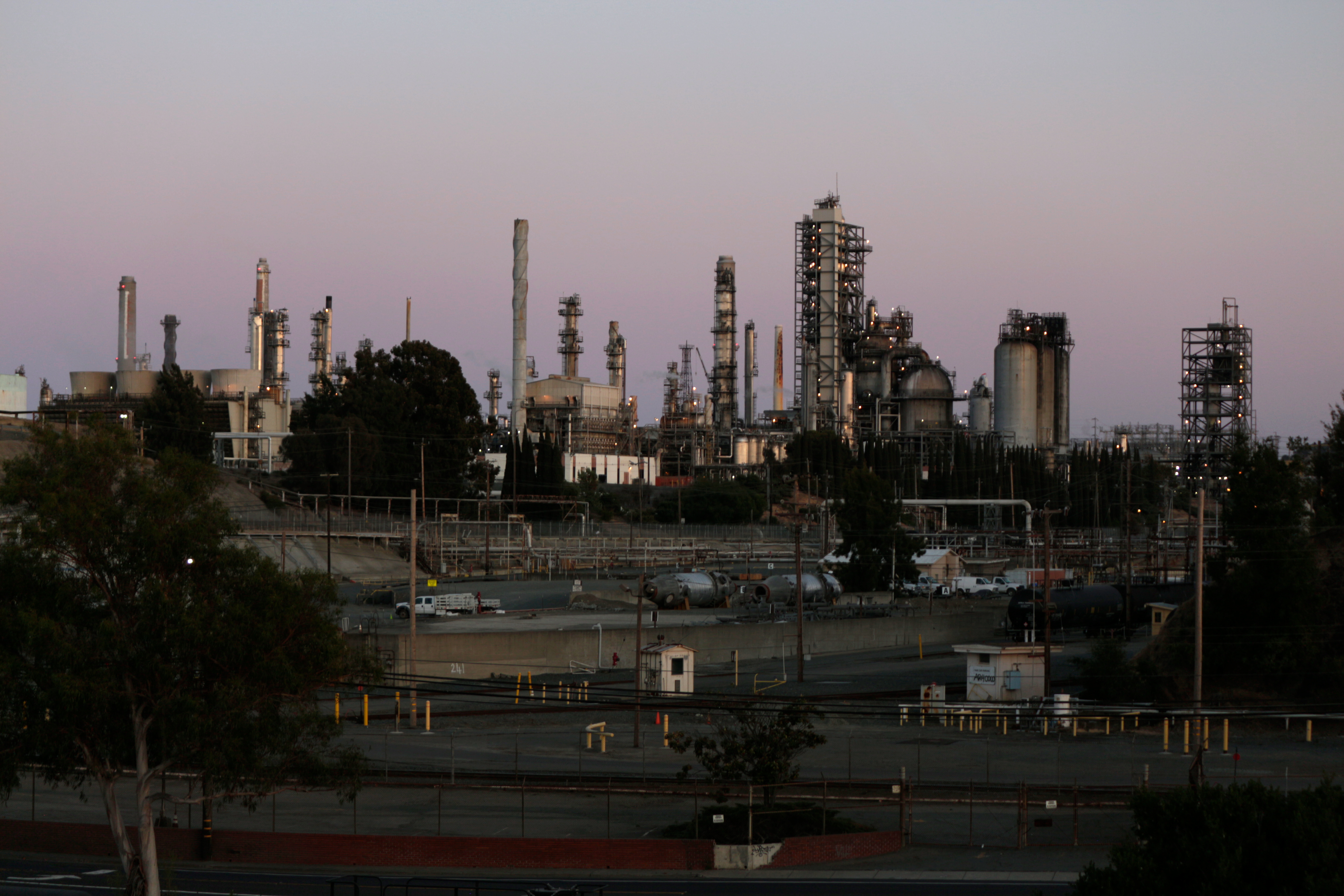
The Shell Martinez Refinery, in Martinez, California, has operated continuously since its construction in 1915.

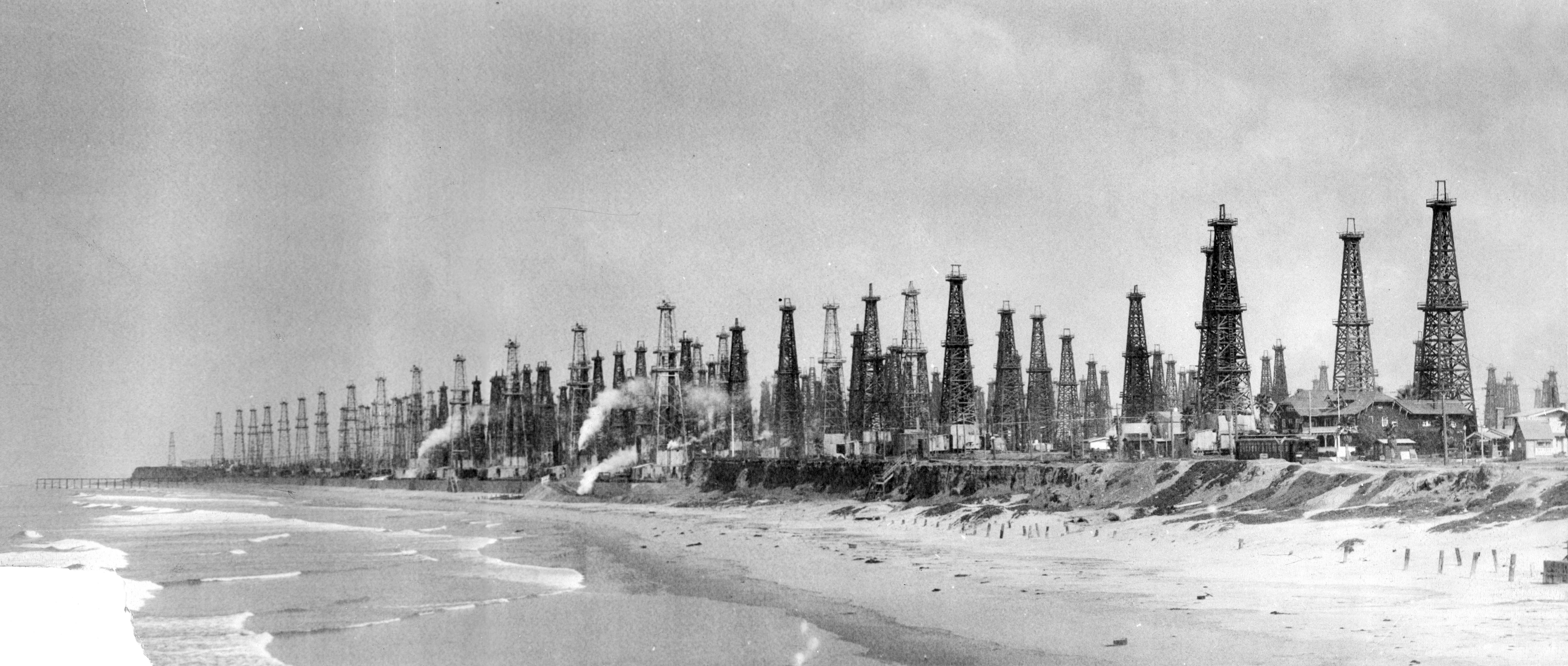
Huntington Beach Oil Field, 1926

At the turn of the century, oil production in California continued to rise at a booming rate. In 1900, the state of California produced 4 million barrels. In 1920, production had expanded to 77 million barrels. Between 1920 and 1930, new oil fields across Southern California were being discovered with regularity including Huntington Beach in 1920, Long Beach and Santa Fe Springs in 1921, and Dominguez in 1923 and Inglewood in 1924. Southern California had become the hotbed for oil production in the United States. In a 1926 Times magazine article, it was said, "[The Standard Oil Company of California] is the largest individual producer of crude oil in the U.S. and dominates the marketing of petroleum products along the west coast of both Americas." During this same period, California's agriculture and manufacturing markets were also expanding rapidly, and the increased oil production helped to power the development of these industries.

However, the development of increased oil production in California had consequences. The additional California oil fields—along with booming oil supplies in Texas from Spindletop—resulted in another surplus of oil reaching the market, again impacting the price of the commodity. With the accelerated oil drillings, the price of oil in the 1920s fell from $28 per barrel to below $10 per barrel. The issue became an increasingly debated topic in the American economy and political arena. In 1924, President Calvin Coolidge created the Federal Oil Conservation Board in an effort to control oil production and stabilize the oil market. However, the American Petroleum Institute (API), representing over 500 oil companies, opposed the program because it feared many of its affiliated oil corporations would go out of business. Ultimately, through API's resistance, Coolidge's program never gained sufficient power.

In 1929, however, the sense of crisis in the oil market grew as vast amounts of oil supplies were going unused in Southern California and throughout the US. The API reversed its stance and urged its members to limit its oil production. Additionally, like his predecessor, President Herbert Hoover attempted to control oil overproduction on the federal level. Hoover met with California Governor C.C. Young to create a commission to regulate the oil industry. Hoover's proposal was defeated because many of the largest oil companies opposed federal regulation. By 1930, there was no solution in place for the depressed oil prices in California and across the United States.
