= Mentryville, California =

Ghost town in Los Angeles County, California

Mentryville
- Ghost town
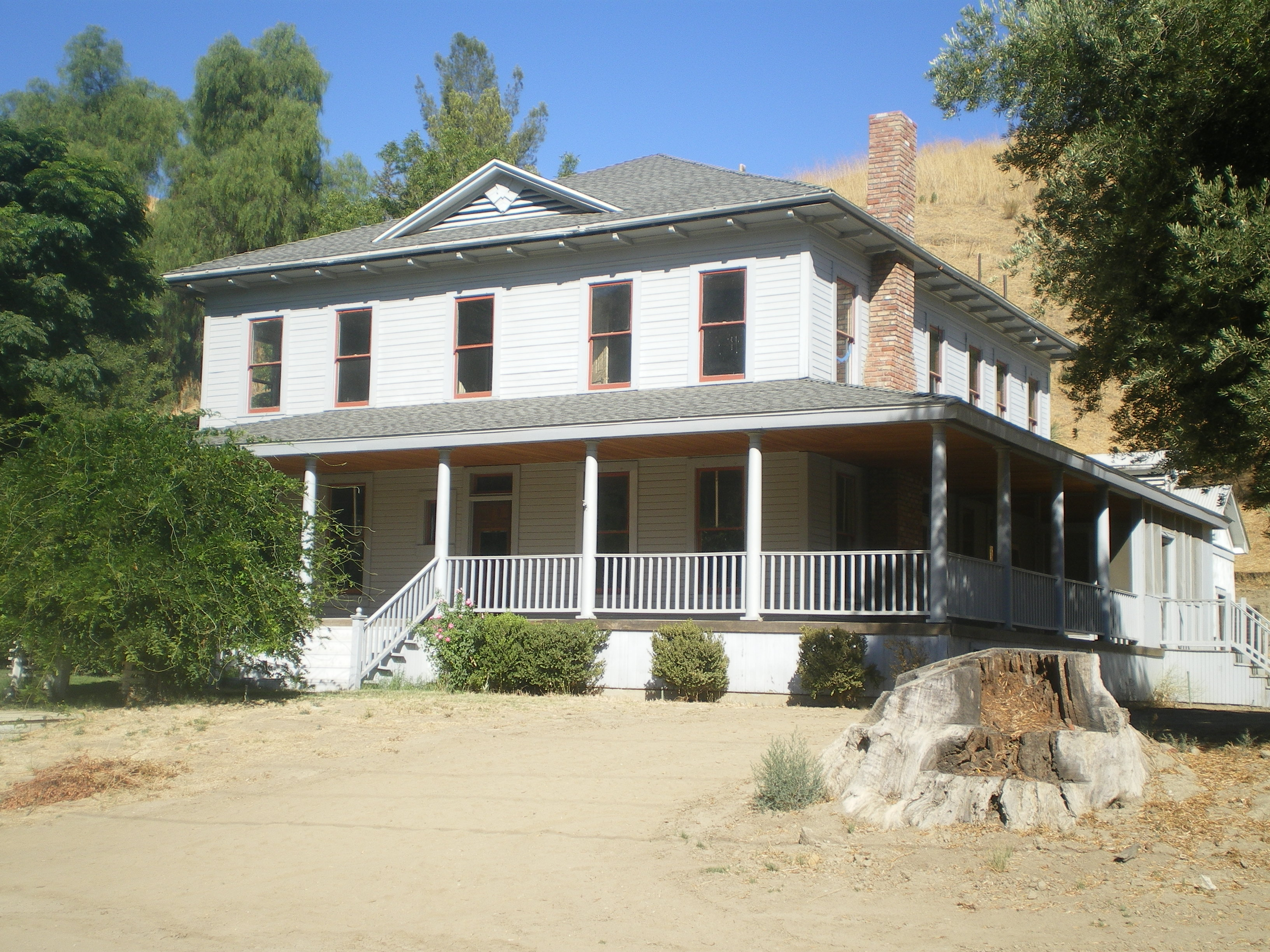
- C.A. Mentry House in 2008

- Location in Santa Clarita Valley Location in Los Angeles County, California
- Coordinates: 34.379°N 118.611°W
- Country: United States
- State: California
- County: Los Angeles
- Elevation: 1,609 ft (490 m)
- Time zone: UTC-8 (PST)
  - Summer (DST): UTC-7 (PDT)
- Area code: 661
- Website: www.scvhistory.com/mentryville/

California Historical Landmark
- Reference no.: 516-2

Mentryville was an oil drilling town in the Santa Susana Mountains in Los Angeles County, California, USA. It was started by Charles Alexander Mentry in the 1870s around the newly discovered oil reserves in that area. The first oil strike was on September 26, 1876. The town is located at the terminus of Pico Canyon Road, four miles west of the Lyons Avenue exit from I-5 in Santa Clarita. It is currently a part of Stevenson Ranch.

== History ==
The town was named for Charles Alexander Mentry, the oil field superintendent from 1876 to 1900.

Charles Alexander Mentry was born in France on March 27, 1847. In November, 1873 he moved to San Francisco with his father, Peter Mentry. Afterward, he briefly moved to San Bernardino County to work at the Holcomb Valley Gold Mining Company before returning to San Francisco in 1874 to work as a stock broker for a year. In 1875 Mentry moved to Grapevine Canyon and worked for the Los Angeles Oil Company, drilling an oil well. He then partnered with J.G. Baker and D.C. Scott to obtain a lease resulting in what was eventually known as the Pico Oil claim. Mentry died in 1900 in Newhall. D. G. Scofield Mentry and financing oil well of the Pico Canyon Oilfield. In 1875 Mentry partnered with Sanford Lyon, Henry Clay Wiley and Los Angeles lawman William Jenkins.

"Pico Number 4", a short distance up the canyon from Mentryville, was the first commercially successful oil strike in California , and the longest running well on record , finally being capped in 1990. The Pico Canyon oil field proved to be the richest in the state's history to that time, and Mentryville became a boomtown from 1876 to 1900. The town was named after the superintendent who was in charge of the oil field, Charles Alexander Mentry. Mentry lived in the town until his death in 1900 and built the 13-room mansion that still stands there. In 1900, the Los Angeles Times described Mentryville as "an ideal community of modest homes," where families were reared and a schoolhouse, social hall, bakery, boarding houses, bunkhouses, blacksmith shop and machine shop were built. There was also a gas-lighted tennis court, croquet fields, and a main road paved with local asphalt. One thing the town lacked was a bar. Mentry had reportedly "imbued the town with his puritanism as well as his name," prohibiting drinking and the use of foul language. When Mentry died, the entire town of more than 200 people, except for three individuals left behind in Mentryville, traveled to Los Angeles for his funeral, bringing with them a large floral arrangement in the shape of an oil derrick.

Mentryville was eventually abandoned, partially because the amount of oil slowed over time, and partially because of changes to the oil industry. During the 1930s, most of Mentryville's remaining residents left, many tearing down their houses board by board and nail by nail, and taking it all with them. By 1962, Mentryville had become a ghost town, with only a caretaker family living in Mentry's old 13-room house. A visitor to the camp that year reported that "rusted oil equipment cluttered the canyon," toppled derricks lay rotting, and the cemetery was "choked with weeds, hidden and forgotten."

== Preservation ==
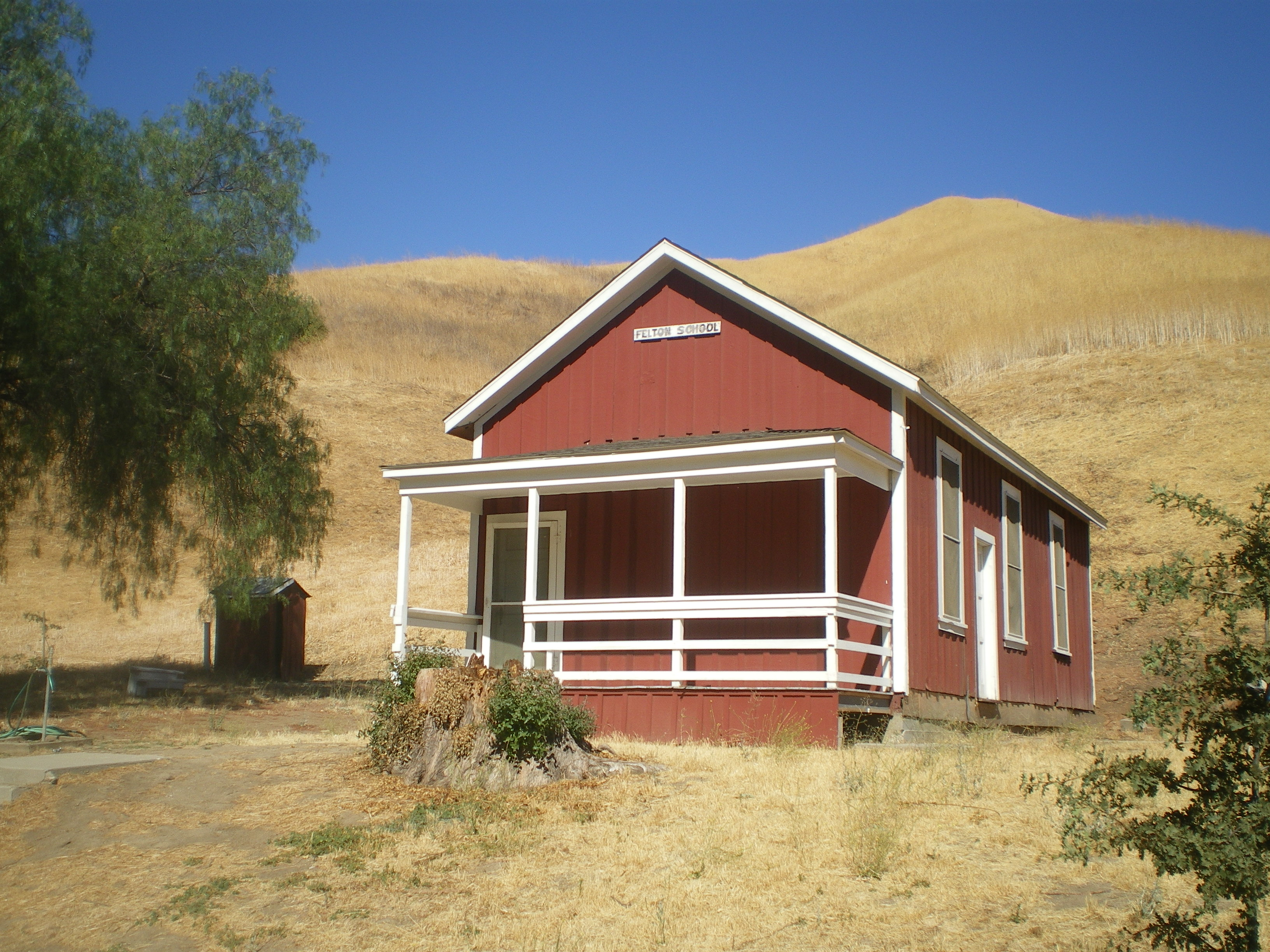
Felton Schoolhouse in 2008. The school was named in honor of Senator Charles N. Felton.

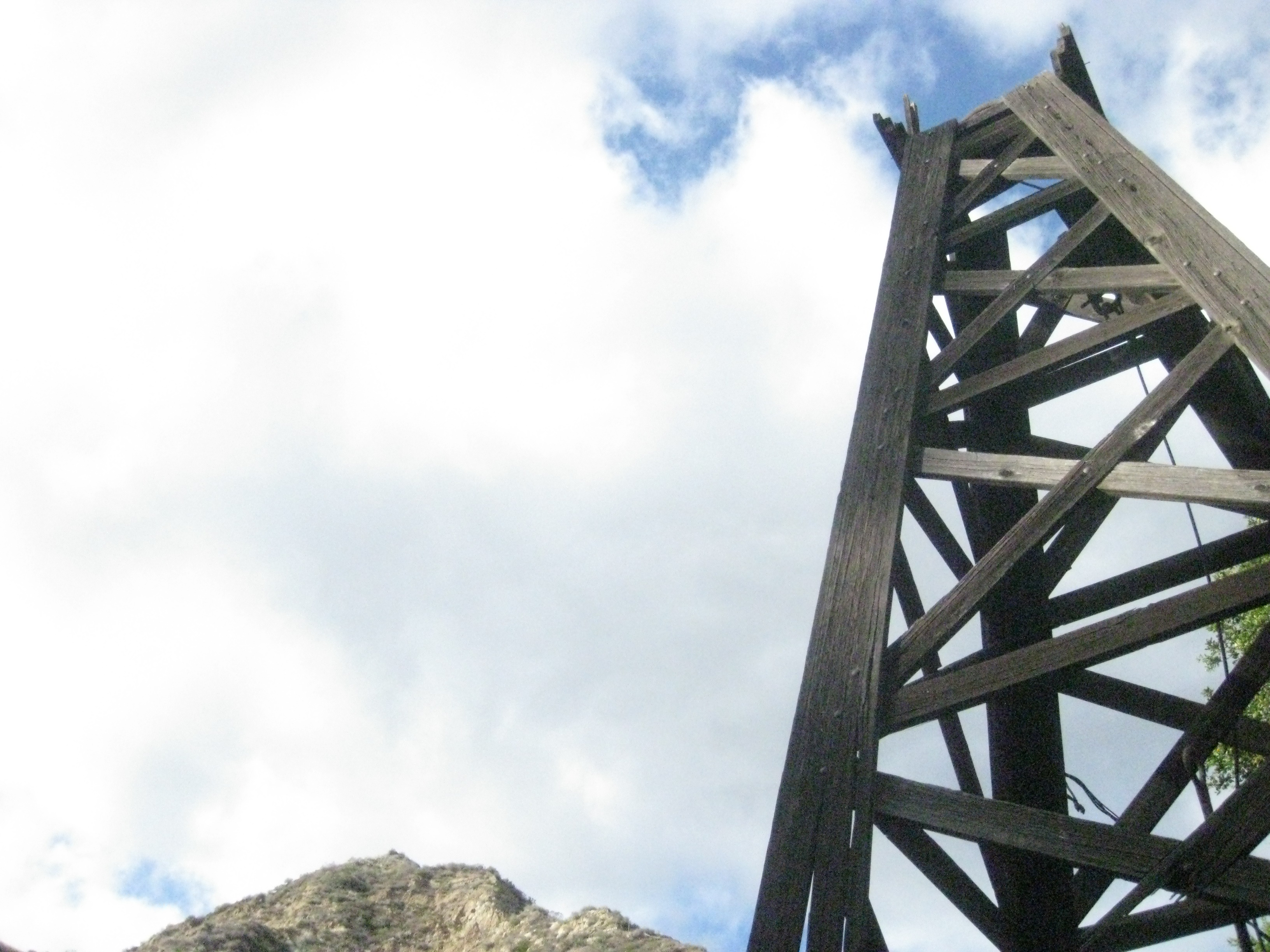
The Mentryville oil derrick.

The last caretaker of Mentryville was Francis "Frenchy" Lagasse, who moved into the old Mentry mansion with his wife and children in 1966. The property's owner, Standard Oil of California, wanted to raze the remnants of the ghost town, but Lagasse persuaded the company to allow him to restore the town. With help from the Santa Clarita Historical Society, Lagasse eventually began offering tours of Mentryville. Lagasse was forced to leave Mentryville after the 1994 Northridge earthquake damaged the house, and in 1995, Chevron (which had become the owner upon its acquisition of Standard Oil of California in 1977) donated the Mentryville site and the surrounding 800 acres (3.2 km^{2}) in Pico Canyon to the Santa Monica Mountains Conservancy. A group called the Friends of Mentryville was organized to restore the buildings and open the old town as a historic park with docent-led tours.

The site is now registered as California Historical Landmark #516-2.

A fire nearly destroyed Mentryville's historic structures in 2003, and a storm in 2004 washed out the visitors' parking lot and also flooded the historic buildings.

== Film and television productions ==
Mentryville and Pico Canyon have become popular shooting locations. They were used in motion pictures, including Steven Spielberg's "The Color Purple" and "Walking Tall Part 2", and in television series, including "The X-Files", "The A-Team", "Murder, She Wrote", and "Highway to Heaven.".

Mentryville is the subject of "Ghost Adventures" Season 26 Episode 5.

== California Historical Landmark Marker ==
California Historical Landmark Marker No. 516–2 at the site reads:

NO. 516-2 MENTRYVILLE – Named after pioneer oil developer Charles Alexander Mentry, who in 1876 drilled the first successful oil well in California. His restored home and barn and Felton School remain here where the Star Oil Company, one of the predecessors of Standard Oil of California, was born.

Nearby is state marker 516 for Well, CSO 4, the marker reads:

NO. 516 WELL, CSO 4 (PICO 4) – On this site stands CSO-4 (Pico No. 4), California's first commercially productive well. It was spudded in early 1876 under direction of Demetrious G. Scofield who later became the first president of Standard Oil Company of California, and was completed at a depth of 300 feet on September 26, 1876, for an initial flow of 30 barrels of oil a day. Later that year, after the well was deepened to 600 feet with what was perhaps the first steam rig employed in oil well drilling in California, it produced at a rate of 150 barrels a day – it is still producing after 77 years (1953). The success of this well prompted formation of the Pacific Coast Oil Company, a predecessor of Standard Oil Company of California, and led to the construction of the state's first refinery nearby. It was not only the discovery well of the Newhall Field, but was a powerful stimulus to the subsequent development of the California petroleum industry.

== See also ==
- List of ghost towns in California
- Pico Canyon Oilfield – includes information on history of Mentryville.
- Santa Susana Mountains
