= Eline Jongsma =

Dutch film director and artist

Eline Jongsma is a Dutch film director and artist. She is one half of the filmmaking duo Jongsma + O’Neill alongside Kel O'Neill.

== Life and career ==
At 16, Jongsma served as a model for a photo in Andres Serrano’s “History of Sex” series. She studied photography at the Gerrit Rietveld Academie and exhibited her photographic work at the Foam Fotografiemuseum Amsterdam.

Jongsma began collaborating with husband Kel O'Neill in 2006 while attending an artist residency in Prishtina, Kosovo. The two served as the two-person directorial and production crew of Empire, a series of non-fiction video installations about the traces of Dutch colonialism in ten countries. The project’s world premiere took place at The International Documentary Film Festival Amsterdam in 2012 and its US premiere took place at Lincoln Center as part of the New York Film Festival in 2013. One of Empire’s video installations was adapted to the internet at the POV Hackathon. POV released a full version of the project in 2014, and in 2015, this adaptation was nominated for a News and Documentary Emmy in the category New Approaches: Documentary Film.

Jongsma and Kel O’Neill won the inaugural Tim Hetherington Trust Visionary Award in 2015. They used the award’s prize money to help produce their follow-up to Empire, The Ark, a VR documentary about the last three Northern White Rhinos on earth. The Ark had its world premiere at the 2016 Tribeca Film Festival in the Storyscapes section. O’Neill and Jongsma’s other work includes Exit: A Mobile Guide To The Apocalypse, which was an Official Selection in the Future of Entertainment section of SXSW 2016.

== Filmography [Director] ==
- The Ark [2016] [co-director, with Kel O’Neill]
- The Empire Project (2012) [co-director, with Kel O’Neill]
- De transformative van Genesis P-Orridge (2008) [co-director, with Kel O’Neill]
