= Mbali Dhlamini =

South African artist (born 1990)

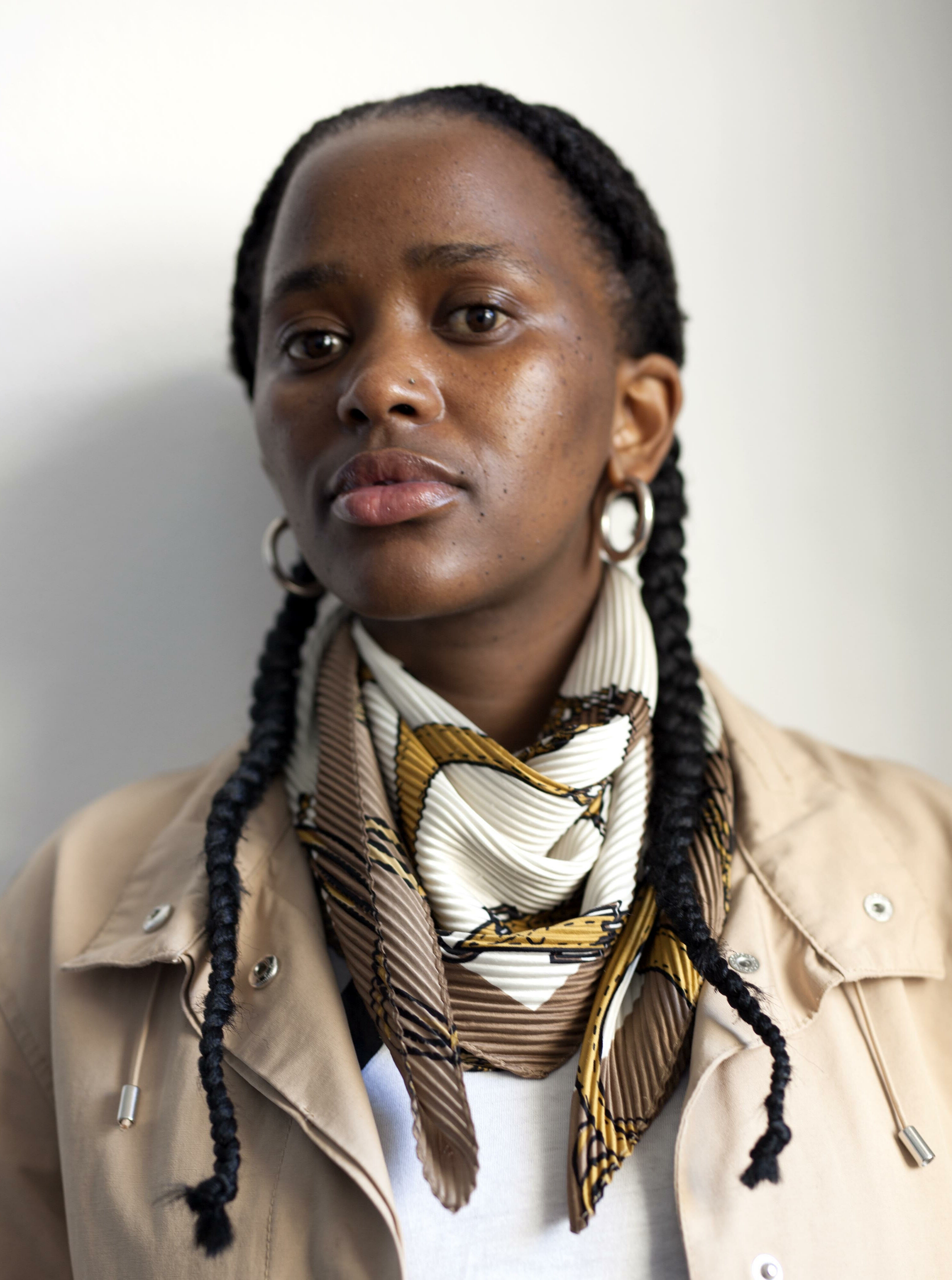
- Dhlamini in 2020
- Born: 1990 (age 35–36); Soweto, Johannesburg, South Africa
- Education: University of Johannesburg; University of the Witwatersrand
- Style: Photography, printmaking

Mbali Dhlamini (born 1990) is a South African artist. She predominantly works in photography and time-based media.

== Life ==
Dhlamini was born 1990 in Soweto, Johannesburg. From 2008 to 2009, she studied printmaking at the Artist Proof Studio in Johannesburg. She then studied Visual Arts at the University of Johannesburg, where she obtained a Bachelor of Technology in 2013. She then studied at the University of the Witwatersrand, Johannesburg, from 2014, graduating with a Master of Arts in 2015. Her thesis was titled, The master's cloth: a rainbow nation, exploring faith and spirituality through colour, a study of Apostolic and Zionist movements in Soweto. Professors Raimi Gbadamosi and David Andrew provided Dhlamini with academic support during her thesis.

Mbali Dhlamini lives in Johannesburg.

== Work ==
In her work, Dhlamini deals with postcolonial issues: with spirituality (Series "Non-Promised Land: Bana Ba Thari Entsho") and with the craft of indigo dyeing in Senegal (Series "Look Into").

In 2014, Dhlamini's work was included in an exhibition South African Voices: A New Generation of Printmakers at the Washington Printmakers Gallery. In 2015, she exhibited at the 6th Beijing International Art Biennale. The same year, Dhlamini created a monotype silkscreen, "A part of me I" during a Google Arts & Culture 89plus residency program. In 2019, her work was included in a show at the European Cultural Center. The same year, JPMorgan Chase Art Collection acquired Dhlamini's photographs featuring African women with traditional indigo dyeing. The source of her photographs was a museum in Senegal during her academic research.

=== Awards and honors ===
From October to December 2021, she was Artist in Residence of the Embassy of Foreign Artists of the Swiss Canton of Geneva.

In December 2021, the Visionary Award from The Javett Art Centre at the University of Pretoria was given to the Preempt Group Collective, which is facilitated by Dhlamini and Phumulani Ntuli.

== See also ==
- Women photographers
- List of South African women artists
